= Norfolk County, Virginia =

Former county in Virginia, United States (1691–1963)

Coordinates: 36.7706°N 76.4644°W

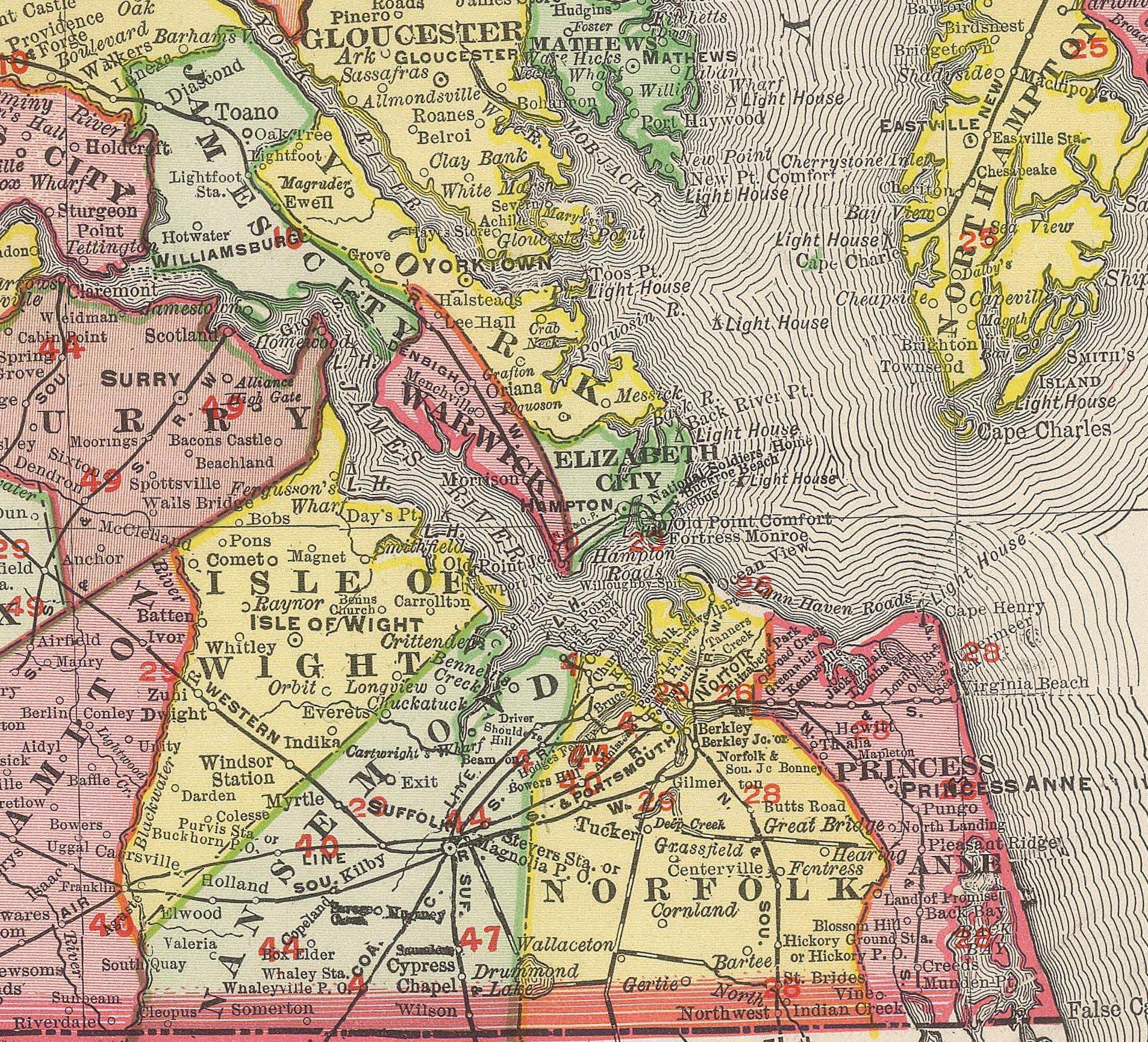
1903 Map depicting Norfolk County and other "lost counties" of Virginia.

Norfolk County was a county of the South Hampton Roads in eastern Virginia in the United States that was created in 1691. After the American Civil War, for a period of about 100 years, portions of Norfolk County were lost and the territory of the county reduced as they were annexed by the independent and growing cities of Norfolk, Portsmouth and South Norfolk.

In 1963, voters approved by referendum in two jurisdictions to consolidate the remaining portions of Norfolk County with the much smaller city of South Norfolk; they chose the name city of Chesapeake for the new independent city. Although organized as a city, and one of the larger in Virginia, Chesapeake has both busy suburban and industrial areas, and mostly rural sections. The latter includes a large portion of the Great Dismal Swamp and large tracts of preserved forest land.

== Shires to counties 1634-1691 ==
During the 17th century, shortly after establishment of the Jamestown Settlement in 1607, English settlers explored and began settling the areas adjacent to what is known as Hampton Roads. By 1634, the English colony of Virginia consisted of eight shires or counties with a total population of approximately 5,000 inhabitants. One of these was Elizabeth City Shire, which included an area on both sides of Hampton Roads. The northern portion became Elizabeth City County in 1643. It is now incorporated into the city limits of Hampton.

In 1636 the southern portion of Elizabeth City Shire became New Norfolk County by order of King Charles I of England. This area was divided again in 1637 into Upper and Lower Norfolk counties.

== 1691 Norfolk County created: Adam Thoroughgood ==
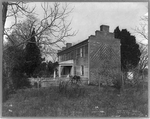
Old Norfolk County, Virginia Court House date unknown, image from collection, U.S. Library of Congress

Historical population
Census	Pop.	Note	%±
1790	14,524		—
1800	19,419		33.7%
1810	22,872		17.8%
1820	23,936		4.7%
1830	24,806		3.6%
1840	27,569		11.1%
1850	33,036		19.8%
1860	36,227		9.7%
1870	46,702		28.9%
1880	58,657		25.6%
1890	77,038		31.3%
1900	50,780		−34.1%
1910	52,744		3.9%
1920	57,358		8.7%
1930	30,082		−47.6%
1940	35,828		19.1%
1950	99,537		177.8%
1960	51,612		−48.1%
U.S. Decennial Census; 1790-1960 1900-1990

In 1691 Lower Norfolk County was in turn divided in two to form Norfolk and Princess Anne counties to accommodate settlement.

Captain Adam Thoroughgood (1604–1640) is credited with naming Norfolk County. Thoroughgood was a prominent resident of the colony. Like so many others at that time, he had been born in England and immigrated to Virginia. He named the new county after his original "home" county across the Atlantic Ocean.

After 1691, Norfolk County remained more or less intact for over 200 years. Portsmouth became the county seat and a major area of commerce, along with Norfolk. Smaller towns were formed at Berkley and South Norfolk. In 1871, Portsmouth and Norfolk became independent cities, a jurisdiction in Virginia, and separated from Norfolk County, though Portsmouth remained the county seat. South Norfolk became an independent city in 1919.

In the following years, the county lost additional territory. The incorporated town of Berkley as well as the areas of Sewell's Point, Willoughby Spit, and Ocean View were annexed successively by Norfolk. By 1960, the entire area of Norfolk County on the east side of the Elizabeth River north of Virginia Beach Boulevard had been annexed by other jurisdictions. On other sides, West Norfolk (Churchland) was lost to Portsmouth, and South Norfolk had also annexed a portion of the county.

== 1963: Creating a new city, Chesapeake ==
United States presidential election results for Norfolk County, Virginia
Year	Republican		Democratic		Third party(ies)	
Year	№	%	№	%	№	%
1880	2,047	56.11%	1,601	43.89%	0	0.00%
1884	2,913	61.57%	1,818	38.43%	0	0.00%
1888	3,741	65.37%	1,969	34.41%	13	0.23%
1892	2,452	47.74%	2,587	50.37%	97	1.89%
1896	3,475	61.24%	2,137	37.66%	62	1.09%
1900	3,024	55.55%	2,415	44.36%	5	0.09%
1904	977	41.86%	1,345	57.63%	12	0.51%
1908	739	45.67%	879	54.33%	0	0.00%
1912	422	24.20%	1,089	62.44%	233	13.36%
1916	684	29.27%	1,612	68.98%	41	1.75%
1920	813	30.43%	1,824	68.26%	35	1.31%
1924	289	21.11%	1,000	73.05%	80	5.84%
1928	1,922	57.54%	1,418	42.46%	0	0.00%
1932	1,072	26.41%	2,926	72.09%	61	1.50%
1936	652	14.80%	3,734	84.75%	20	0.45%
1940	639	14.28%	3,821	85.39%	15	0.34%
1944	1,527	21.78%	5,467	77.98%	17	0.24%
1948	1,830	25.81%	4,696	66.24%	563	7.94%
1952	5,614	45.30%	6,766	54.60%	12	0.10%
1956	4,558	41.74%	6,026	55.18%	336	3.08%
1960	3,769	42.18%	5,101	57.08%	66	0.74%

In Virginia, cities are immune from annexation by each other. In the early 1960s, the most recent attempt by the City of Norfolk to annex another portion of Norfolk County threatened to completely surround the tiny City of South Norfolk. That failed annexation would have threatened South Norfolk's viability as an independent entity. Since Norfolk County residents also feared future annexation suits, in this battle of municipalities, the residents of Norfolk County and the city of South Norfolk became allies.

A strategy successfully used about 10 years earlier by Elizabeth City County, the Town of Phoebus, and the City of Hampton offered a solution. In 1963, after a referendum of South Norfolk and of Norfolk County's voters, and the approval of the Virginia General Assembly, South Norfolk and almost all of remaining Norfolk County consolidated and reorganized as the new City of Chesapeake, with the name chosen by the voters.

== See also ==
- Elizabeth City Shire
- New Norfolk County
- Lower Norfolk County
- Berkley
- City of Norfolk
- Sewell's Point
- Willoughby Spit
- Ocean View
- Bower's Hill
- Lambert's Point
- Deep Creek
- Western Branch
- Great Bridge
- Portsmouth Courthouse
