= 1916 United States presidential election in Virginia =

- November 7, 1916

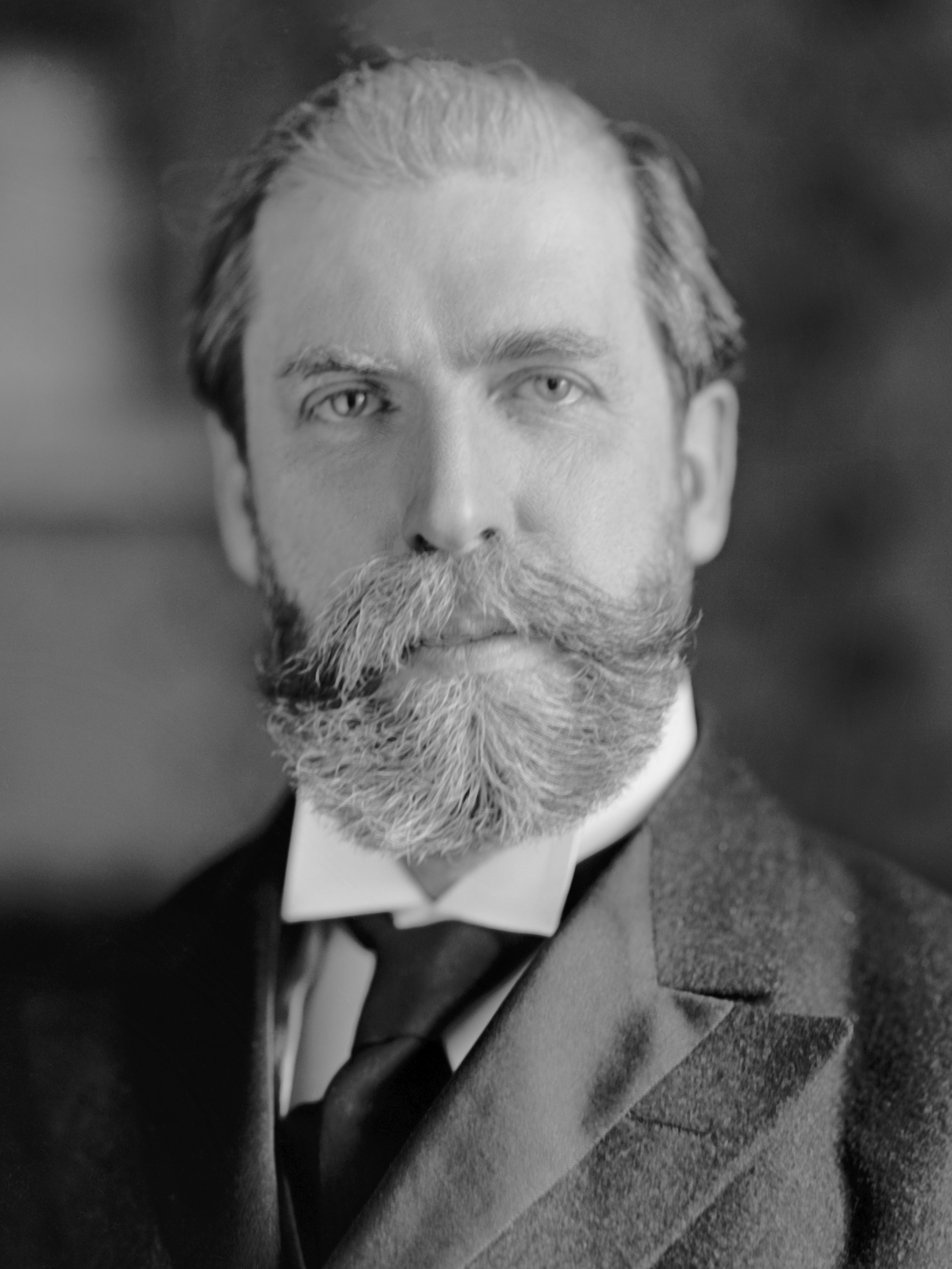
Nominee	Woodrow Wilson	Charles Evans Hughes
Party	Democratic	Republican
Home state	New Jersey	New York
Running mate	Thomas R. Marshall	Charles W. Fairbanks
Electoral vote	12	0
Popular vote	102,824	49,356
Percentage	66.77%	32.05%
County and independent city results
Wilson
40–50%
50–60%
60–70%
70–80%
80–90%
90–100%
Hughes
50–60%
60–70%
President before election
Woodrow Wilson
Democratic
Elected President
Woodrow Wilson
Democratic

The 1916 United States presidential election in Virginia took place on November 7, 1916. Voters chose 12 representatives, or electors to the Electoral College, who voted for president and vice president.

The 1900s had seen Virginia, like all former Confederate States, almost completely disenfranchise its black and poor white populations through the use of a cumulative poll tax and literacy tests. So severe was the disenfranchising effect of the new 1902 Constitution that the electorate for the 1904 presidential election was halved compared to that of previous elections, and it has been calculated that a third of those who voted were state employees and officeholders.

This limited electorate meant Virginian politics was controlled by political machines based in Southside Virginia — firstly one led by Thomas Staples Martin and after he died the Byrd Organization. Progressive “antiorganization” factions were rendered impotent by the inability of almost all of their potential electorate to vote. Unlike the Deep South, historical fusion with the “Readjuster” Democrats, defection of substantial proportions of the Northeast-aligned white electorate of the Shenandoah Valley and Southwest Virginia over free silver, and an early move towards a “lily white” Jim Crow party meant that in general elections the Republicans retained around one-third of the small statewide electorate, with the majority of GOP support located in the western part of the state. However, in many parts of the state — like in Tennessee during the same period — the parties avoided competition by an agreed division over local offices.

Unlike in 1908, neither major party campaigned in the state — which had voted Democratic in every election since 1876 — during the fall. A straw ballot taken early in September saw Democratic nominee and incumbent President Woodrow Wilson gaining seventy-nine votes to the Republican nominee, former U.S. Supreme Court Justice Charles E. Hughes’ six. Later straw polls in October did not even include the state, and ultimately Virginia voted for Wilson by a slightly greater majority than he had won four years previously. Wilson ultimately won the national election with 49.24 percent of the vote.

== Results ==
1916 United States presidential election in Virginia
Party	Candidate	Votes	Percentage	Electoral votes
Democratic	Woodrow Wilson (inc.)	102,824	66.77%	12
Republican	Charles E. Hughes	49,356	32.05%	0
Socialist	Allan L. Benson	1,062	0.69%	0
Prohibition	Frank Hanly	683	0.45%	0
Socialist Labor	Arthur E. Reimer	67	0.04%	0
Totals		153,992	100.00%	12

=== Results by county ===
1916 United States presidential election in Virginia by counties and independent cities
County or Independent City	Woodrow Wilson Democratic		Charles E. Hughes Republican		Allan L. Benson Socialist		Frank Hanly Prohibition		Arthur E. Reimer Socialist Labor		Margin		Total votes cast
County or Independent City	#	%	#	%	#	%	#	%	#	%	#	%	Total votes cast
Accomack County	1,745	84.30%	299	14.44%	0	0.00%	26	1.26%	0	0.00%	1,446	69.86%	2,070
Albemarle County	1,376	86.05%	223	13.95%	0	0.00%	0	0.00%	0	0.00%	1,153	72.11%	1,599
Alexandria County	515	54.21%	412	43.37%	14	1.47%	8	0.84%	1	0.11%	103	10.84%	950
Alleghany County	544	54.78%	432	43.50%	3	0.30%	14	1.41%	0	0.00%	112	11.28%	993
Amelia County	403	82.58%	80	16.39%	1	0.20%	3	0.61%	1	0.20%	323	66.19%	488
Amherst County	1,142	91.58%	93	7.46%	10	0.80%	1	0.08%	1	0.08%	1,049	84.12%	1,247
Appomattox County	700	83.73%	133	15.91%	2	0.24%	0	0.00%	1	0.12%	567	67.82%	836
Augusta County	1,751	66.23%	845	31.96%	8	0.30%	40	1.51%	0	0.00%	906	34.27%	2,644
Bath County	387	63.24%	219	35.78%	0	0.00%	6	0.98%	0	0.00%	168	27.45%	612
Bedford County	1,628	84.05%	298	15.38%	7	0.36%	4	0.21%	0	0.00%	1,330	68.66%	1,937
Bland County	356	45.64%	420	53.85%	0	0.00%	4	0.51%	0	0.00%	-64	-8.21%	780
Botetourt County	900	53.22%	775	45.83%	2	0.12%	13	0.77%	1	0.06%	125	7.39%	1,691
Brunswick County	772	90.40%	82	9.60%	0	0.00%	0	0.00%	0	0.00%	690	80.80%	854
Buchanan County	720	46.33%	827	53.22%	1	0.06%	3	0.19%	3	0.19%	-107	-6.89%	1,554
Buckingham County	625	76.78%	181	22.24%	7	0.86%	1	0.12%	0	0.00%	444	54.55%	814
Campbell County	1,007	79.60%	185	14.62%	67	5.30%	6	0.47%	0	0.00%	822	64.98%	1,265
Caroline County	637	75.83%	198	23.57%	0	0.00%	4	0.48%	1	0.12%	439	52.26%	840
Carroll County	858	37.60%	1,424	62.40%	0	0.00%	0	0.00%	0	0.00%	-566	-24.80%	2,282
Charles City County	139	70.56%	57	28.93%	0	0.00%	1	0.51%	0	0.00%	82	41.62%	197
Charlotte County	856	78.39%	227	20.79%	9	0.82%	0	0.00%	0	0.00%	629	57.60%	1,092
Chesterfield County	699	81.47%	141	16.43%	10	1.17%	8	0.93%	0	0.00%	558	65.03%	858
Clarke County	590	92.19%	49	7.66%	0	0.00%	1	0.16%	0	0.00%	541	84.53%	640
Craig County	369	64.62%	200	35.03%	2	0.35%	0	0.00%	0	0.00%	169	29.60%	571
Culpeper County	849	81.79%	184	17.73%	1	0.10%	4	0.39%	0	0.00%	665	64.07%	1,038
Cumberland County	446	85.93%	73	14.07%	0	0.00%	0	0.00%	0	0.00%	373	71.87%	519
Dickenson County	650	45.42%	753	52.62%	27	1.89%	1	0.07%	0	0.00%	-103	-7.20%	1,431
Dinwiddie County	592	87.32%	85	12.54%	0	0.00%	1	0.15%	0	0.00%	507	74.78%	678
Elizabeth City County	411	73.39%	132	23.57%	10	1.79%	5	0.89%	2	0.36%	279	49.82%	560
Essex County	302	79.68%	77	20.32%	0	0.00%	0	0.00%	0	0.00%	225	59.37%	379
Fairfax County	1,179	70.77%	472	28.33%	5	0.30%	10	0.60%	0	0.00%	707	42.44%	1,666
Fauquier County	1,204	76.49%	367	23.32%	2	0.13%	1	0.06%	0	0.00%	837	53.18%	1,574
Floyd County (Note: These figures are taken from the World Almanac, because the Report of the Secretary of the Commonwealth did not provide (or lost) the returns for this county.)	472	34.58%	893	65.42%	0	0.00%	0	0.00%	0	0.00%	-421	-30.84%	1,365
Fluvanna County	513	86.36%	81	13.64%	0	0.00%	0	0.00%	0	0.00%	432	72.73%	594
Franklin County	1,481	57.36%	1,094	42.37%	6	0.23%	1	0.04%	0	0.00%	387	14.99%	2,582
Frederick County	1,194	75.52%	366	23.15%	11	0.70%	10	0.63%	0	0.00%	828	52.37%	1,581
Giles County	839	58.26%	596	41.39%	2	0.14%	2	0.14%	1	0.07%	243	16.88%	1,440
Gloucester County	582	80.17%	142	19.56%	0	0.00%	0	0.00%	2	0.28%	440	60.61%	726
Goochland County	413	67.59%	193	31.59%	5	0.82%	0	0.00%	0	0.00%	220	36.01%	611
Grayson County	967	43.66%	1,244	56.16%	2	0.09%	1	0.05%	1	0.05%	-277	-12.51%	2,215
Greene County	221	48.04%	239	51.96%	0	0.00%	0	0.00%	0	0.00%	-18	-3.91%	460
Greensville County	392	83.40%	76	16.17%	0	0.00%	2	0.43%	0	0.00%	316	67.23%	470
Halifax County	1,781	77.74%	493	21.52%	15	0.65%	2	0.09%	0	0.00%	1,288	56.22%	2,291
Hanover County	760	86.96%	102	11.67%	7	0.80%	5	0.57%	0	0.00%	658	75.29%	874
Henrico County	690	81.18%	140	16.47%	15	1.76%	1	0.12%	4	0.47%	550	64.71%	850
Henry County	851	59.55%	567	39.68%	6	0.42%	5	0.35%	0	0.00%	284	19.87%	1,429
Highland County	370	54.17%	310	45.39%	0	0.00%	3	0.44%	0	0.00%	60	8.78%	683
Isle of Wight County	679	82.80%	140	17.07%	0	0.00%	1	0.12%	0	0.00%	539	65.73%	820
James City County	127	77.91%	34	20.86%	0	0.00%	2	1.23%	0	0.00%	93	57.06%	163
King and Queen County	271	68.09%	127	31.91%	0	0.00%	0	0.00%	0	0.00%	144	36.18%	398
King George County	223	50.34%	217	48.98%	1	0.23%	2	0.45%	0	0.00%	6	1.35%	443
King William County	342	74.19%	119	25.81%	0	0.00%	0	0.00%	0	0.00%	223	48.37%	461
Lancaster County	461	88.31%	58	11.11%	0	0.00%	3	0.57%	0	0.00%	403	77.20%	522
Lee County	1,287	44.86%	1,569	54.69%	11	0.38%	1	0.03%	1	0.03%	-282	-9.83%	2,869
Loudoun County	1,490	77.52%	404	21.02%	2	0.10%	26	1.35%	0	0.00%	1,086	56.50%	1,922
Louisa County	710	72.08%	263	26.70%	8	0.81%	4	0.41%	0	0.00%	447	45.38%	985
Lunenburg County	814	86.87%	110	11.74%	12	1.28%	0	0.00%	1	0.11%	704	75.13%	937
Madison County	572	61.64%	348	37.50%	0	0.00%	7	0.75%	1	0.11%	224	24.14%	928
Mathews County	549	83.94%	90	13.76%	0	0.00%	15	2.29%	0	0.00%	459	70.18%	654
Mecklenburg County	1,317	85.30%	222	14.38%	0	0.00%	5	0.32%	0	0.00%	1,095	70.92%	1,544
Middlesex County	373	70.64%	155	29.36%	0	0.00%	0	0.00%	0	0.00%	218	41.29%	528
Montgomery County	765	45.89%	891	53.45%	1	0.06%	10	0.60%	0	0.00%	-126	-7.56%	1,667
Nansemond County	663	90.45%	70	9.55%	0	0.00%	0	0.00%	0	0.00%	593	80.90%	733
Nelson County	1,063	81.02%	249	18.98%	0	0.00%	0	0.00%	0	0.00%	814	62.04%	1,312
New Kent County	192	72.73%	69	26.14%	1	0.38%	2	0.76%	0	0.00%	123	46.59%	264
Norfolk County	1,612	68.98%	684	29.27%	19	0.81%	8	0.34%	14	0.60%	928	39.71%	2,337
Northampton County	802	87.17%	109	11.85%	0	0.00%	9	0.98%	0	0.00%	693	75.33%	920
Northumberland County	503	81.52%	111	17.99%	0	0.00%	3	0.49%	0	0.00%	392	63.53%	617
Nottoway County	608	85.88%	91	12.85%	4	0.56%	5	0.71%	0	0.00%	517	73.02%	708
Orange County	608	79.58%	153	20.03%	1	0.13%	1	0.13%	1	0.13%	455	59.55%	764
Page County	842	57.01%	613	41.50%	4	0.27%	17	1.15%	1	0.07%	229	15.50%	1,477
Patrick County	872	51.60%	815	48.22%	1	0.06%	2	0.12%	0	0.00%	57	3.37%	1,690
Pittsylvania County	2,012	70.52%	801	28.08%	30	1.05%	10	0.35%	0	0.00%	1,211	42.45%	2,853
Powhatan County	233	67.34%	112	32.37%	1	0.29%	0	0.00%	0	0.00%	121	34.97%	346
Prince Edward County	668	86.08%	108	13.92%	0	0.00%	0	0.00%	0	0.00%	560	72.16%	776
Prince George County	258	77.95%	72	21.75%	1	0.30%	0	0.00%	0	0.00%	186	56.19%	331
Prince William County	754	79.37%	192	20.21%	2	0.21%	2	0.21%	0	0.00%	562	59.16%	950
Princess Anne County	515	88.34%	67	11.49%	0	0.00%	1	0.17%	0	0.00%	448	76.84%	583
Pulaski County	1,057	56.71%	721	38.68%	0	0.00%	86	4.61%	0	0.00%	336	18.03%	1,864
Rappahannock County	401	81.50%	84	17.07%	7	1.42%	0	0.00%	0	0.00%	317	64.43%	492
Richmond County	329	64.64%	180	35.36%	0	0.00%	0	0.00%	0	0.00%	149	29.27%	509
Roanoke County	850	63.24%	460	34.23%	26	1.93%	8	0.60%	0	0.00%	390	29.02%	1,344
Rockbridge County	1,049	63.15%	601	36.18%	6	0.36%	5	0.30%	0	0.00%	448	26.97%	1,661
Rockingham County	1,650	54.78%	1,322	43.89%	15	0.50%	25	0.83%	0	0.00%	328	10.89%	3,012
Russell County	1,570	52.49%	1,410	47.14%	4	0.13%	4	0.13%	3	0.10%	160	5.35%	2,991
Scott County	1,319	42.87%	1,743	56.65%	13	0.42%	1	0.03%	1	0.03%	-424	-13.78%	3,077
Shenandoah County	1,440	49.21%	1,425	48.70%	37	1.26%	24	0.82%	0	0.00%	15	0.51%	2,926
Smyth County	1,134	46.04%	1,321	53.63%	5	0.20%	2	0.08%	1	0.04%	-187	-7.59%	2,463
Southampton County	1,045	89.09%	128	10.91%	0	0.00%	0	0.00%	0	0.00%	917	78.18%	1,173
Spotsylvania County	398	61.33%	249	38.37%	0	0.00%	2	0.31%	0	0.00%	149	22.96%	649
Stafford County	444	51.15%	422	48.62%	0	0.00%	2	0.23%	0	0.00%	22	2.53%	868
Surry County	430	81.59%	90	17.08%	4	0.76%	3	0.57%	0	0.00%	340	64.52%	527
Sussex County	486	82.79%	96	16.35%	2	0.34%	3	0.51%	0	0.00%	390	66.44%	587
Tazewell County	1,108	40.74%	1,591	58.49%	11	0.40%	10	0.37%	0	0.00%	-483	-17.76%	2,720
Warren County	583	72.24%	214	26.52%	0	0.00%	10	1.24%	0	0.00%	369	45.72%	807
Warwick County	97	64.67%	53	35.33%	0	0.00%	0	0.00%	0	0.00%	44	29.33%	150
Washington County	1,863	51.91%	1,717	47.84%	2	0.06%	7	0.20%	0	0.00%	146	4.07%	3,589
Westmoreland County	338	72.69%	126	27.10%	1	0.22%	0	0.00%	0	0.00%	212	45.59%	465
Wise County	1,468	43.63%	1,862	55.33%	33	0.98%	1	0.03%	1	0.03%	-394	-11.71%	3,365
Wythe County	1,334	49.23%	1,370	50.55%	2	0.07%	2	0.07%	2	0.07%	-36	-1.33%	2,710
York County	247	82.89%	51	17.11%	0	0.00%	0	0.00%	0	0.00%	196	65.77%	298
Alexandria City	1,038	73.51%	364	25.78%	6	0.42%	3	0.00%	1	0.07%	674	47.73%	1,412
Bristol City	489	72.23%	184	27.18%	3	0.44%	1	0.60%	0	0.00%	305	45.05%	677
Buena Vista City	158	62.70%	92	36.51%	0	0.00%	2	0.30%	0	0.00%	66	26.19%	252
Charlottesville City	618	83.63%	117	15.83%	3	0.41%	1	0.83%	0	0.00%	501	67.79%	739
Clifton Forge City	455	74.35%	104	16.99%	48	7.84%	5	0.13%	0	0.00%	351	57.35%	612
Danville City	1,151	76.99%	229	15.32%	107	7.16%	7	0.03%	1	0.07%	922	61.67%	1,495
Fredericksburg City	380	68.59%	173	31.23%	0	0.00%	1	0.82%	0	0.00%	207	37.36%	554
Hampton City	350	85.37%	56	13.66%	3	0.73%	1	0.08%	0	0.00%	294	71.71%	410
Harrisonburg City	346	51.64%	319	47.61%	4	0.60%	1	0.00%	0	0.00%	27	4.03%	670
Hopewell City	24	85.71%	3	10.71%	1	3.57%	0	0.31%	0	0.00%	21	75.00%	28
Lynchburg City	1,465	79.53%	353	19.16%	16	0.87%	8	0.23%	0	0.00%	1,112	60.37%	1,842
Newport News City	939	64.10%	465	31.74%	52	3.55%	5	0.57%	4	0.27%	474	32.35%	1,465
Norfolk City	3,234	75.35%	963	22.44%	72	1.68%	23	0.51%	0	0.00%	2,271	52.91%	4,292
Petersburg City	1,155	87.04%	161	12.13%	3	0.23%	7	0.37%	1	0.08%	994	74.91%	1,327
Portsmouth City	1,368	75.54%	376	20.76%	52	2.87%	13	1.24%	2	0.11%	992	54.78%	1,811
Radford City	206	63.00%	115	35.17%	5	1.53%	1	0.00%	0	0.00%	91	27.83%	327
Richmond City	6,987	84.15%	1,210	14.57%	76	0.92%	24	0.20%	6	0.07%	5,777	69.58%	8,303
Roanoke City	2,246	76.14%	610	20.68%	78	2.64%	10	0.00%	6	0.20%	1,636	55.46%	2,950
Staunton City	511	61.34%	311	37.33%	0	0.00%	11	0.03%	0	0.00%	200	24.01%	833
Suffolk City	437	72.35%	158	26.16%	1	0.17%	8	0.07%	0	0.00%	279	46.19%	604
Williamsburg City	97	82.20%	21	17.80%	0	0.00%	0	0.00%	0	0.00%	76	64.41%	118
Winchester City	468	68.42%	196	28.65%	2	0.29%	18	2.63%	0	0.00%	272	39.77%	684
Totals	102,825	66.78%	49,358	32.05%	1,062	0.69%	683	0.44%	67	0.04%	53,467	34.72%	153,984
