= 1892 United States presidential election in Virginia =

- November 8, 1892

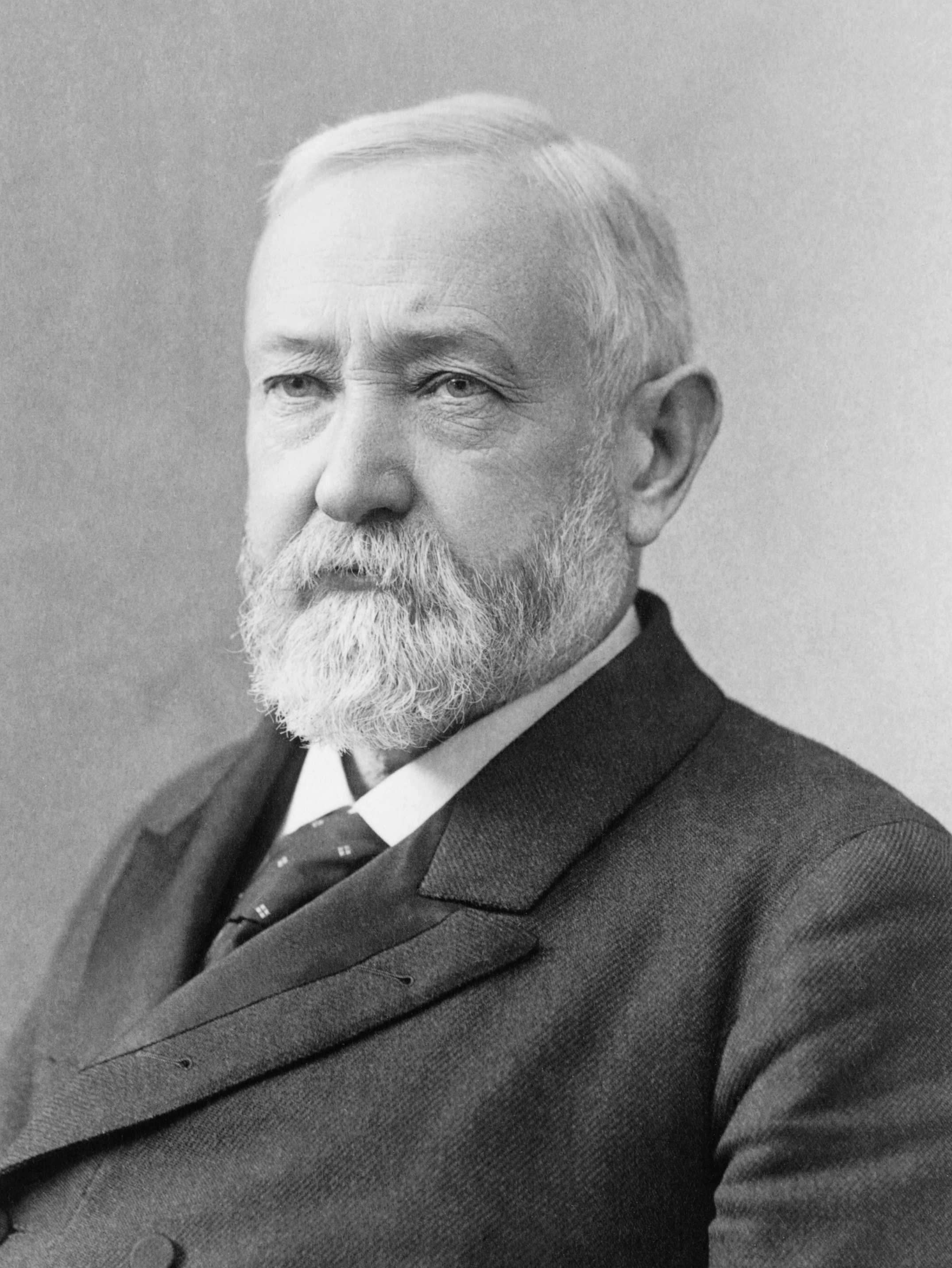
Nominee	Grover Cleveland	Benjamin Harrison
Party	Democratic	Republican
Home state	New York	Indiana
Running mate	Adlai Stevenson I	Whitelaw Reid
Electoral vote	12	0
Popular vote	164,136	113,098
Percentage	56.17%	38.70%
County and independent city results
Cleveland
40–50%
50–60%
60–70%
70–80%
Harrison
40–50%
50–60%
60–70%
President before election
Benjamin Harrison
Republican
Elected President
Grover Cleveland
Democratic

The 1892 United States presidential election in Virginia took place on November 8, 1892, as part of the 1892 United States presidential election. Voters chose 12 representatives, or electors to the Electoral College, who voted for president and vice president.

Virginia voted for the Democratic candidate, former President Grover Cleveland over the Republican candidate, incumbent President Benjamin Harrison. Cleveland won the state by a margin of 17.46 percentage points.

== Results ==
1892 United States presidential election in Virginia
Party	Candidate	Votes	Percentage	Electoral votes
Democratic	Grover Cleveland	164,136	56.17%	12
Republican	Benjamin Harrison (inc.)	113,098	38.70%	0
Populist	James B. Weaver	12,275	4.20%	0
Prohibition	John Bidwell	2,729	0.93%	0
Totals		292,238	100.0%	12

=== Results by county ===
1892 United States presidential election in Virginia by counties and independent cities
County or city	Grover Cleveland Democratic		Benjamin Harrison Republican		James B. Weaver Populist		John Bidwell Prohibition		Margin		Total votes cast
County or city	#	%	#	%	#	%	#	%	#	%	Total votes cast
Accomack County	3,529	64.78%	1,733	31.81%	4	0.07%	182	3.34%	1,796	32.97%	5,448
Albemarle County	2,757	60.18%	1,795	39.18%	22	0.48%	7	0.15%	962	21.00%	4,581
Alexandria County	1,169	50.87%	1,069	46.52%	10	0.44%	50	2.18%	100	4.35%	2,298
Alleghany County	499	59.48%	340	40.52%	0	0.00%	0	0.00%	159	18.95%	839
Amelia County	501	40.86%	563	45.92%	158	12.89%	4	0.33%	-62	-5.06%	1,226
Amherst County	1,666	56.04%	1,190	40.03%	117	3.94%	0	0.00%	476	16.01%	2,973
Appomattox County	776	45.27%	691	40.32%	247	14.41%	0	0.00%	85	4.96%	1,714
Augusta County	3,563	59.52%	2,136	35.68%	102	1.70%	185	3.09%	1,427	23.84%	5,986
Bath County	488	56.35%	310	35.80%	68	7.85%	0	0.00%	178	20.55%	866
Bedford County	3,216	61.64%	1,590	30.48%	358	6.86%	53	1.02%	1,626	31.17%	5,217
Bland County	501	53.35%	159	16.93%	279	29.71%	0	0.00%	222 (Note: In this county where Weaver ran ahead of Harrison, margin given in Cleveland vote minus Weaver vote and percentage margin is Cleveland percentrage minus Weaver percentage.)	23.64%	939
Botetourt County	1,681	56.33%	1,196	40.08%	17	0.57%	90	3.02%	485	16.25%	2,984
Brunswick County	1,049	45.77%	947	41.32%	290	12.65%	6	0.26%	102	4.45%	2,292
Buchanan County	472	51.87%	367	40.33%	71	7.80%	0	0.00%	105	11.54%	910
Buckingham County	1,269	50.86%	1,052	42.16%	174	6.97%	0	0.00%	217	8.70%	2,495
Campbell County	1,765	50.24%	1,210	34.44%	532	15.14%	6	0.17%	555	15.80%	3,513
Caroline County	1,235	43.75%	1,343	47.57%	245	8.68%	0	0.00%	-108	-3.83%	2,823
Carroll County	1,450	57.81%	1,008	40.19%	50	1.99%	0	0.00%	442	17.62%	2,508
Charles City County	337	37.99%	541	60.99%	9	1.01%	0	0.00%	-204	-23.00%	887
Charlotte County	1,396	57.83%	815	33.76%	169	7.00%	34	1.41%	581	24.07%	2,414
Chesterfield County	1,747	55.64%	1,241	39.52%	136	4.33%	16	0.51%	506	16.11%	3,140
Clarke County	1,208	71.99%	409	24.37%	38	2.26%	23	1.37%	799	47.62%	1,678
Craig County	535	67.98%	164	20.84%	80	10.17%	8	1.02%	371	47.14%	787
Culpeper County	1,561	60.88%	991	38.65%	12	0.47%	0	0.00%	570	22.23%	2,564
Cumberland County	560	36.51%	838	54.63%	135	8.80%	1	0.07%	-278	-18.12%	1,534
Dickenson County	439	56.35%	295	37.87%	45	5.78%	0	0.00%	144	18.49%	779
Dinwiddie County	597	39.85%	674	44.99%	220	14.69%	7	0.47%	-77	-5.14%	1,498
Elizabeth City County	891	39.15%	1,309	57.51%	68	2.99%	8	0.35%	-418	-18.37%	2,276
Essex County	890	48.16%	903	48.86%	54	2.92%	1	0.05%	-13	-0.70%	1,848
Fairfax County	2,168	58.12%	1,537	41.21%	9	0.24%	16	0.43%	631	16.92%	3,730
Fauquier County	2,802	66.12%	1,348	31.81%	88	2.08%	0	0.00%	1,454	34.31%	4,238
Floyd County	854	42.49%	954	47.46%	164	8.16%	38	1.89%	-100	-4.98%	2,010
Fluvanna County	918	58.92%	488	31.32%	151	9.69%	1	0.06%	430	27.60%	1,558
Franklin County	2,262	57.09%	1,178	29.73%	522	13.18%	0	0.00%	1,084	27.36%	3,962
Frederick County	2,035	72.60%	700	24.97%	34	1.21%	34	1.21%	1,335	47.63%	2,803
Giles County	1,059	65.25%	399	24.58%	139	8.56%	26	1.60%	660	40.67%	1,623
Gloucester County	907	38.11%	1,276	53.61%	182	7.65%	15	0.63%	-369	-15.50%	2,380
Goochland County	626	42.07%	790	53.09%	72	4.84%	0	0.00%	-164	-11.02%	1,488
Grayson County	1,299	57.55%	832	36.86%	122	5.41%	4	0.18%	467	20.69%	2,257
Greene County	629	62.09%	356	35.14%	28	2.76%	0	0.00%	273	26.95%	1,013
Greensville County	362	44.58%	320	39.41%	130	16.01%	0	0.00%	42	5.17%	812
Halifax County	3,133	54.68%	1,937	33.80%	581	10.14%	79	1.38%	1,196	20.87%	5,730
Hanover County	1,536	53.48%	1,064	37.05%	263	9.16%	9	0.31%	472	16.43%	2,872
Henrico County	2,374	54.47%	1,849	42.43%	119	2.73%	16	0.37%	525	12.05%	4,358
Henry County	1,317	44.27%	1,459	49.04%	190	6.39%	9	0.30%	-142	-4.77%	2,975
Highland County	611	60.20%	386	38.03%	16	1.58%	2	0.20%	225	22.17%	1,015
Isle of Wight County	1,494	67.60%	636	28.78%	73	3.30%	7	0.32%	858	38.82%	2,210
James City County	233	33.29%	466	66.57%	0	0.00%	1	0.14%	-233	-33.29%	700
King and Queen County	564	50.18%	527	46.89%	33	2.94%	0	0.00%	37	3.29%	1,124
King George County	722	44.57%	731	45.12%	167	10.31%	0	0.00%	-9	-0.56%	1,620
King William County	672	43.08%	844	54.10%	32	2.05%	12	0.77%	-172	-11.03%	1,560
Lancaster County	983	51.87%	896	47.28%	12	0.63%	4	0.21%	87	4.59%	1,895
Lee County	1,604	57.47%	1,131	40.52%	25	0.90%	31	1.11%	473	16.95%	2,791
Loudoun County	2,719	58.39%	1,738	37.32%	63	1.35%	137	2.94%	981	21.07%	4,657
Louisa County	1,296	46.24%	1,373	48.98%	120	4.28%	14	0.50%	-77	-2.75%	2,803
Lunenburg County	819	63.74%	363	28.25%	103	8.02%	0	0.00%	456	35.49%	1,285
Madison County	1,115	61.81%	579	32.10%	110	6.10%	0	0.00%	536	29.71%	1,804
Mathews County	931	58.19%	591	36.94%	59	3.69%	19	1.19%	340	21.25%	1,600
Mecklenburg County	1,345	40.23%	1,484	44.39%	512	15.32%	2	0.06%	-139	-4.16%	3,343
Middlesex County	271	44.87%	291	48.18%	42	6.95%	0	0.00%	-20	-3.31%	604
Montgomery County	1,286	46.21%	1,128	40.53%	280	10.06%	89	3.20%	158	5.68%	2,783
Nansemond County	1,763	50.94%	1,477	42.68%	214	6.18%	7	0.20%	286	8.26%	3,461
Nelson County	1,409	55.23%	1,020	39.98%	98	3.84%	24	0.94%	389	15.25%	2,551
New Kent County	366	40.40%	513	56.62%	25	2.76%	2	0.22%	-147	-16.23%	906
Norfolk County	2,587	50.37%	2,452	47.74%	59	1.15%	38	0.74%	135	2.63%	5,136
Northampton County	1,225	49.49%	1,238	50.02%	6	0.24%	6	0.24%	-13	-0.53%	2,475
Northumberland County	953	52.28%	792	43.44%	75	4.11%	3	0.16%	161	8.83%	1,823
Nottoway County	931	60.03%	587	37.85%	33	2.13%	0	0.00%	344	22.18%	1,551
Orange County	1,343	59.74%	831	36.97%	64	2.85%	10	0.44%	512	22.78%	2,248
Page County	1,351	55.51%	927	38.09%	112	4.60%	44	1.81%	424	17.42%	2,434
Patrick County	1,288	57.65%	873	39.08%	70	3.13%	3	0.13%	415	18.58%	2,234
Pittsylvania County	3,661	46.92%	3,320	42.55%	746	9.56%	76	0.97%	341	4.37%	7,803
Powhatan County	396	32.43%	642	52.58%	183	14.99%	0	0.00%	-246	-20.15%	1,221
Prince Edward County	766	48.85%	788	50.26%	14	0.89%	0	0.00%	-22	-1.40%	1,568
Prince George County	270	31.21%	545	63.01%	50	5.78%	0	0.00%	-275	-31.79%	865
Prince William County	1,356	65.92%	663	32.23%	38	1.85%	0	0.00%	693	33.69%	2,057
Princess Anne County	623	57.47%	409	37.73%	45	4.15%	7	0.65%	214	19.74%	1,084
Pulaski County	1,397	54.15%	1,154	44.73%	10	0.39%	19	0.74%	243	9.42%	2,580
Rappahannock County	1,056	71.93%	384	26.16%	23	1.57%	5	0.34%	672	45.78%	1,468
Richmond County	644	48.24%	652	48.84%	39	2.92%	0	0.00%	-8	-0.60%	1,335
Roanoke County	1,527	52.12%	1,290	44.03%	14	0.48%	99	3.38%	237	8.09%	2,930
Rockbridge County	2,210	57.19%	1,576	40.79%	63	1.63%	15	0.39%	634	16.41%	3,864
Rockingham County	3,293	52.81%	2,724	43.68%	52	0.83%	167	2.68%	569	9.12%	6,236
Russell County	1,659	60.20%	752	27.29%	330	11.97%	15	0.54%	907	32.91%	2,756
Scott County	1,746	49.45%	1,433	40.58%	340	9.63%	12	0.34%	313	8.86%	3,531
Shenandoah County	2,315	54.66%	1,705	40.26%	117	2.76%	98	2.31%	610	14.40%	4,235
Smyth County	1,352	58.23%	841	36.22%	129	5.56%	0	0.00%	511	22.01%	2,322
Southampton County	1,127	42.84%	1,200	45.61%	279	10.60%	25	0.95%	-73	-2.77%	2,631
Spotsylvania County	849	53.30%	679	42.62%	64	4.02%	1	0.06%	170	10.67%	1,593
Stafford County	742	56.38%	558	42.40%	16	1.22%	0	0.00%	184	13.98%	1,316
Surry County	562	40.81%	671	48.73%	129	9.37%	15	1.09%	-109	-7.92%	1,377
Sussex County	291	28.47%	638	62.43%	93	9.10%	0	0.00%	-347	-33.95%	1,022
Tazewell County	1,573	45.55%	1,784	51.67%	68	1.97%	28	0.81%	-211	-6.11%	3,453
Warren County	1,286	74.90%	389	22.66%	7	0.41%	35	2.04%	897	52.24%	1,717
Warwick County	988	59.66%	650	39.25%	13	0.79%	5	0.30%	338	20.41%	1,656
Washington County	2,783	58.42%	1,774	37.24%	158	3.32%	49	1.03%	1,009	21.18%	4,764
Westmoreland County	726	46.21%	817	52.01%	27	1.72%	1	0.06%	-91	-5.79%	1,571
Wise County	1,101	58.81%	731	39.05%	37	1.98%	3	0.16%	370	19.76%	1,872
Wythe County	1,838	55.82%	1,243	37.75%	182	5.53%	30	0.91%	595	18.07%	3,293
York County	533	38.82%	798	58.12%	11	0.80%	31	2.26%	-265	-19.30%	1,373
Alexandria City	1,982	62.66%	1,162	36.74%	2	0.06%	17	0.54%	820	25.92%	3,163
Bristol City	465	64.94%	235	32.82%	0	0.00%	16	2.23%	230	32.12%	716
Buena Vista City	341	79.86%	86	20.14%	0	0.00%	0	0.00%	255	59.72%	427
Charlottesville City	889	74.39%	296	24.77%	0	0.00%	10	0.84%	593	49.62%	1,195
Danville City	1,234	63.09%	710	36.30%	2	0.10%	10	0.51%	524	26.79%	1,956
Fredericksburg City	655	67.18%	311	31.90%	4	0.41%	5	0.51%	344	35.28%	975
Lynchburg City	2,422	63.55%	1,358	35.63%	3	0.08%	28	0.73%	1,064	27.92%	3,811
Manchester City	1,252	67.20%	550	29.52%	6	0.32%	55	2.95%	702	37.68%	1,863
Norfolk City	4,479	73.20%	1,542	25.20%	0	0.00%	98	1.60%	2,937	48.00%	6,119
North Danville City	495	64.62%	219	28.59%	14	1.83%	38	4.96%	276	36.03%	766
Petersburg City	2,558	70.94%	1,046	29.01%	2	0.06%	0	0.00%	1,512	41.93%	3,606
Portsmouth City	1,728	61.45%	1,052	37.41%	0	0.00%	32	1.14%	676	24.04%	2,812
Radford City	591	74.53%	185	23.33%	2	0.25%	15	1.89%	406	51.20%	793
Richmond City	10,139	74.85%	3,289	24.28%	54	0.40%	63	0.47%	6,850	50.57%	13,545
Roanoke City	2,707	57.80%	1,870	39.93%	0	0.00%	106	2.26%	837	17.87%	4,683
Staunton City	919	58.87%	549	35.17%	2	0.13%	91	5.83%	370	23.70%	1,561
Williamsburg City	122	50.21%	120	49.38%	0	0.00%	1	0.41%	2	0.82%	243
Winchester City	579	54.01%	468	43.66%	0	0.00%	25	2.33%	111	10.35%	1,072
Totals	164,136	56.17%	113,098	38.70%	12,275	4.20%	2,729	0.93%	51,038	17.46%	292,238

== See also ==
- United States presidential elections in Virginia
