= 1884 United States presidential election in Virginia =

- November 4, 1884

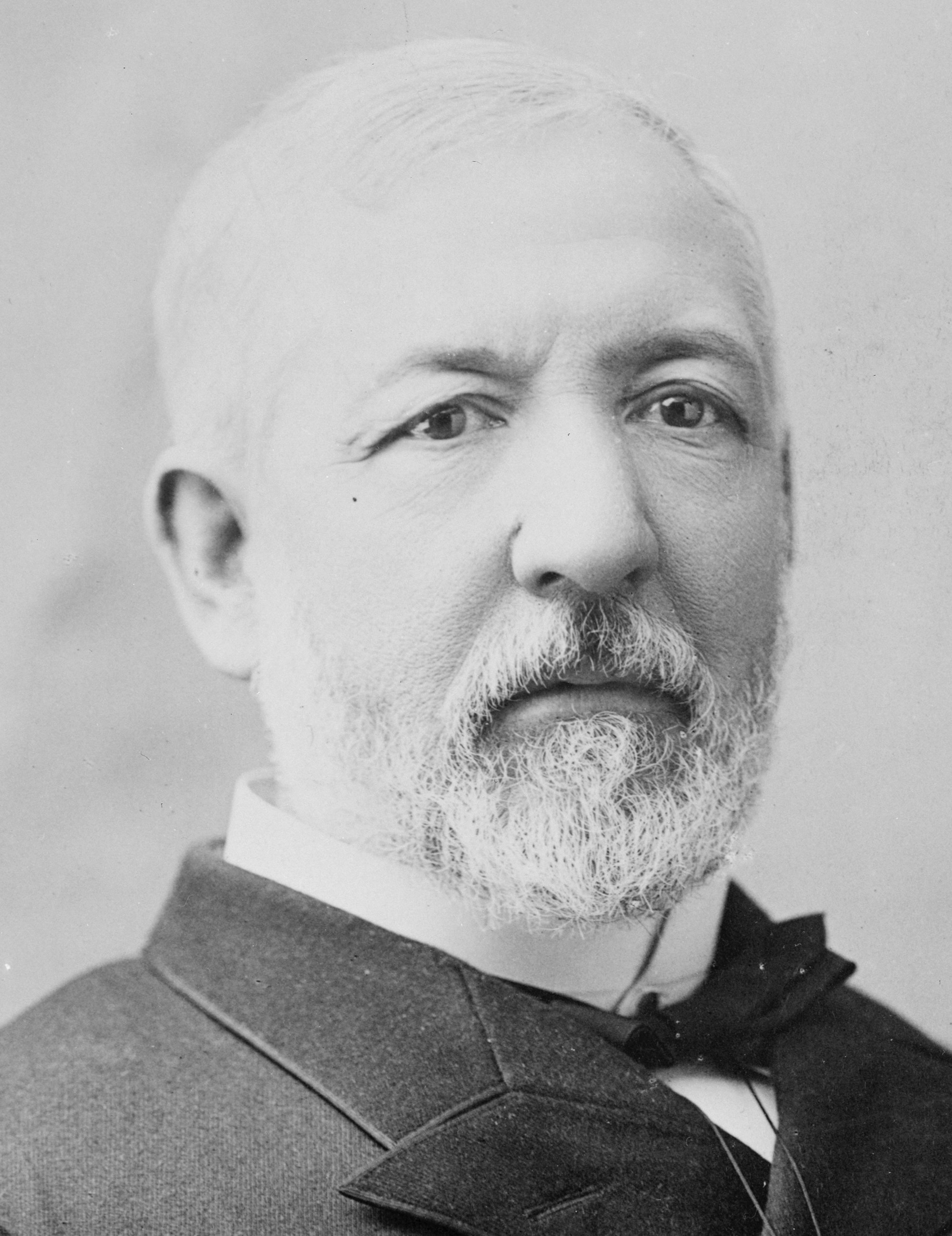
Nominee	Grover Cleveland	James G. Blaine
Party	Democratic	Republican
Home state	New York	Maine
Running mate	Thomas A. Hendricks	John A. Logan
Electoral vote	12	0
Popular vote	185,491	139,356
Percentage	51.05%	48.90%
County and independent city results
Cleveland
50–60%
60–70%
70–80%
80–90%
Blaine
50–60%
60–70%
70–80%
President before election
Chester A. Arthur
Republican
Elected President
Grover Cleveland
Democratic

The 1884 United States presidential election in Virginia took place on November 4, 1884, as part of the 1884 United States presidential election. Voters chose 12 representatives, or electors to the Electoral College, who voted for president and vice president.

Virginia voted for the Democratic candidate, New York Governor Grover Cleveland over the Republican candidate, former Secretary of State James G. Blaine. Cleveland won Virginia by a narrow margin of 2.15 percentage points.

== Results ==
1884 United States presidential election in Virginia
Party	Candidate	Votes	Percentage	Electoral votes
Democratic	Grover Cleveland	185,491	51.05%	12
Republican	James G. Blaine	139,356	48.90%	0
Prohibition	John St. John	130	0.05%	0
Totals		284,977	100.0%	12

=== Results by county ===
1884 United States presidential election in Virginia by counties and independent cities
County or Independent City	Grover Cleveland Democratic		James G. Blaine Republican		John St. John Prohibition		Margin		Total votes cast
County or Independent City	#	%	#	%	#	%	#	%	Total votes cast
Accomack County	2,949	63.47%	1,697	36.53%	0	0.00%	1,252	26.95%	4,646
Albemarle County	2,941	53.20%	2,587	46.80%	0	0.00%	354	6.40%	5,528
Alleghany County	731	43.96%	932	56.04%	0	0.00%	-201	-12.09%	1,663
Amelia County	590	36.02%	1,048	63.98%	0	0.00%	-458	-27.96%	1,638
Amherst County	1,969	59.09%	1,363	40.91%	0	0.00%	606	18.19%	3,332
Appomattox County	849	49.10%	880	50.90%	0	0.00%	-31	-1.79%	1,729
Alexandria County	264	34.15%	509	65.85%	0	0.00%	-245	-31.69%	773
Augusta County	3,332	57.41%	2,472	42.59%	0	0.00%	860	14.82%	5,804
Bath County	482	57.31%	359	42.69%	0	0.00%	123	14.63%	841
Bedford County	3,397	62.86%	2,007	37.14%	0	0.00%	1,390	25.72%	5,404
Bland County	501	51.86%	465	48.14%	0	0.00%	36	3.73%	966
Botetourt County	1,614	60.07%	1,073	39.93%	0	0.00%	541	20.13%	2,687
Brunswick County	1,107	41.41%	1,566	58.59%	0	0.00%	-459	-17.17%	2,673
Buchanan County	287	54.15%	243	45.85%	0	0.00%	44	8.30%	530
Buckingham County	1,176	41.67%	1,646	58.33%	0	0.00%	-470	-16.65%	2,822
Campbell County	2,207	58.31%	1,578	41.69%	0	0.00%	629	16.62%	3,785
Caroline County	1,506	49.17%	1,547	50.51%	10	0.33%	-41	-1.34%	3,063
Carroll County	1,234	55.29%	998	44.71%	0	0.00%	236	10.57%	2,232
Charles City County	356	34.56%	674	65.44%	0	0.00%	-318	-30.87%	1,030
Charlotte County	1,604	57.41%	1,190	42.59%	0	0.00%	414	14.82%	2,794
Chesterfield County	1,780	52.93%	1,582	47.04%	1	0.03%	198	5.89%	3,363
Clarke County	1,183	71.22%	478	28.78%	0	0.00%	705	42.44%	1,661
Craig County	544	83.05%	111	16.95%	0	0.00%	433	66.11%	655
Culpeper County	1,395	55.36%	1,125	44.64%	0	0.00%	270	10.71%	2,520
Cumberland County	600	35.71%	1,080	64.29%	0	0.00%	-480	-28.57%	1,680
Dickenson County	288	55.17%	234	44.83%	0	0.00%	54	10.34%	522
Dinwiddie County	862	38.02%	1,405	61.98%	0	0.00%	-543	-23.95%	2,267
Elizabeth City County	525	26.17%	1,481	73.83%	0	0.00%	-956	-47.66%	2,006
Essex County	853	43.56%	1,105	56.44%	0	0.00%	-252	-12.87%	1,958
Fairfax County	1,883	52.83%	1,681	47.17%	0	0.00%	202	5.67%	3,564
Fauquier County	2,629	64.03%	1,477	35.97%	0	0.00%	1,152	28.06%	4,106
Floyd County	862	44.00%	1,097	56.00%	0	0.00%	-235	-12.00%	1,959
Fluvanna County	1,047	55.90%	826	44.10%	0	0.00%	221	11.80%	1,873
Franklin County	2,617	63.58%	1,499	36.42%	0	0.00%	1,118	27.16%	4,116
Frederick County	1,786	72.40%	681	27.60%	0	0.00%	1,105	44.79%	2,467
Giles County	900	60.12%	597	39.88%	0	0.00%	303	20.24%	1,497
Gloucester County	1,075	45.80%	1,266	53.94%	6	0.26%	-191	-8.14%	2,347
Goochland County	752	41.96%	1,040	58.04%	0	0.00%	-288	-16.07%	1,792
Grayson County	1,105	57.97%	801	42.03%	0	0.00%	304	15.95%	1,906
Greene County	550	57.35%	409	42.65%	0	0.00%	141	14.70%	959
Greensville County	540	33.17%	1,088	66.83%	0	0.00%	-548	-33.66%	1,628
Halifax County	3,393	53.46%	2,954	46.54%	0	0.00%	439	6.92%	6,347
Hanover County	1,816	54.96%	1,488	45.04%	0	0.00%	328	9.93%	3,304
Henrico County	1,755	44.60%	2,174	55.25%	6	0.15%	-419	-10.65%	3,935
Henry County	1,356	49.01%	1,411	50.99%	0	0.00%	-55	-1.99%	2,767
Highland County	508	52.21%	461	47.38%	4	0.41%	47	4.83%	973
Isle of Wight County	1,272	48.55%	1,348	51.45%	0	0.00%	-76	-2.90%	2,620
James City County	243	28.52%	609	71.48%	0	0.00%	-366	-42.96%	852
King and Queen County	933	50.19%	926	49.81%	0	0.00%	7	0.38%	1,859
King George County	544	42.70%	730	57.30%	0	0.00%	-186	-14.60%	1,274
King William County	782	43.09%	1,033	56.91%	0	0.00%	-251	-13.83%	1,815
Lancaster County	667	43.68%	859	56.25%	1	0.07%	-192	-12.57%	1,527
Lee County	1,334	56.67%	1,020	43.33%	0	0.00%	314	13.34%	2,354
Loudoun County	2,795	58.24%	1,978	41.22%	26	0.54%	817	17.02%	4,799
Louisa County	1,372	46.37%	1,587	53.63%	0	0.00%	-215	-7.27%	2,959
Lunenburg County	811	44.49%	1,012	55.51%	0	0.00%	-201	-11.03%	1,823
Madison County	983	53.60%	851	46.40%	0	0.00%	132	7.20%	1,834
Mathews County	963	64.76%	524	35.24%	0	0.00%	439	29.52%	1,487
Mecklenburg County	1,695	41.51%	2,388	58.49%	0	0.00%	-693	-16.97%	4,083
Middlesex County	630	44.62%	780	55.24%	2	0.14%	-150	-10.62%	1,412
Montgomery County	1,416	51.81%	1,308	47.86%	9	0.33%	108	3.95%	2,733
Nansemond County	1,353	40.11%	2,020	59.89%	0	0.00%	-667	-19.77%	3,373
Nelson County	1,658	57.07%	1,247	42.93%	0	0.00%	411	14.15%	2,905
New Kent County	440	38.90%	691	61.10%	0	0.00%	-251	-22.19%	1,131
Norfolk County	1,818	38.43%	2,913	61.57%	0	0.00%	-1,095	-23.15%	4,731
Northampton County	905	45.18%	1,098	54.82%	0	0.00%	-193	-9.64%	2,003
Northumberland County	893	50.88%	862	49.12%	0	0.00%	31	1.77%	1,755
Nottoway County	453	26.17%	1,277	73.77%	1	0.06%	-824	-47.60%	1,731
Orange County	1,259	54.98%	1,031	45.02%	0	0.00%	228	9.96%	2,290
Page County	1,157	51.45%	1,089	48.42%	3	0.13%	68	3.02%	2,249
Patrick County	992	58.63%	700	41.37%	0	0.00%	292	17.26%	1,692
Pittsylvania County	4,477	56.34%	3,470	43.66%	0	0.00%	1,007	12.67%	7,947
Powhatan County	488	35.06%	904	64.94%	0	0.00%	-416	-29.89%	1,392
Prince Edward County	860	39.50%	1,317	60.50%	0	0.00%	-457	-20.99%	2,177
Prince George County	560	32.39%	1,169	67.61%	0	0.00%	-609	-35.22%	1,729
Prince William County	1,243	68.33%	576	31.67%	0	0.00%	667	36.67%	1,819
Princess Anne County	986	50.38%	971	49.62%	0	0.00%	15	0.77%	1,957
Pulaski County	891	53.23%	780	46.59%	3	0.18%	111	6.63%	1,674
Rappahannock County	997	66.78%	496	33.22%	0	0.00%	501	33.56%	1,493
Richmond County	612	44.41%	766	55.59%	0	0.00%	-154	-11.18%	1,378
Roanoke County	1,006	47.41%	1,116	52.59%	0	0.00%	-110	-5.18%	2,122
Rockbridge County	2,072	51.21%	1,970	48.69%	4	0.10%	102	2.52%	4,046
Rockingham County	2,762	50.01%	2,761	49.99%	0	0.00%	1	0.02%	5,523
Russell County	1,222	53.11%	1,079	46.89%	0	0.00%	143	6.21%	2,301
Scott County	1,324	44.90%	1,625	55.10%	0	0.00%	-301	-10.21%	2,949
Shenandoah County	1,976	51.35%	1,872	48.65%	0	0.00%	104	2.70%	3,848
Smyth County	1,172	52.09%	1,078	47.91%	0	0.00%	94	4.18%	2,250
Southampton County	1,549	46.80%	1,761	53.20%	0	0.00%	-212	-6.40%	3,310
Spotsylvania County	844	50.72%	820	49.28%	0	0.00%	24	1.44%	1,664
Stafford County	644	45.71%	762	54.08%	3	0.21%	-118	-8.37%	1,409
Surry County	611	39.65%	930	60.35%	0	0.00%	-319	-20.70%	1,541
Sussex County	750	34.22%	1,442	65.78%	0	0.00%	-692	-31.57%	2,192
Tazewell County	858	40.06%	1,284	59.94%	0	0.00%	-426	-19.89%	2,142
Warren County	1,155	78.52%	316	21.48%	0	0.00%	839	57.04%	1,471
Warwick County	313	32.71%	644	67.29%	0	0.00%	-331	-34.59%	957
Washington County	2,627	57.38%	1,951	42.62%	0	0.00%	676	14.77%	4,578
Westmoreland County	718	42.97%	953	57.03%	0	0.00%	-235	-14.06%	1,671
Wise County	510	52.52%	461	47.48%	0	0.00%	49	5.05%	971
Wythe County	1,414	50.12%	1,406	49.84%	1	0.04%	8	0.28%	2,821
York County	579	38.68%	918	61.32%	0	0.00%	-339	-22.65%	1,497
Alexandria City	1,730	57.36%	1,273	42.21%	13	0.43%	457	15.15%	3,016
Danville City	997	52.89%	888	47.11%	0	0.00%	109	5.78%	1,885
Fredericksburg City	562	58.12%	402	41.57%	3	0.31%	160	16.55%	967
Lynchburg City	1,926	52.25%	1,760	47.75%	0	0.00%	166	4.50%	3,686
Manchester City	864	59.30%	593	40.70%	0	0.00%	271	18.60%	1,457
Norfolk City	2,392	46.12%	2,795	53.88%	0	0.00%	-403	-7.77%	5,187
North Danville City	235	59.34%	161	40.66%	0	0.00%	74	18.69%	396
Petersburg City	1,612	36.83%	2,765	63.17%	0	0.00%	-1,153	-26.34%	4,377
Portsmouth City	1,312	49.40%	1,344	50.60%	0	0.00%	-32	-1.20%	2,656
Richmond City	7,599	57.05%	5,716	42.92%	4	0.03%	1,883	14.14%	13,319
Roanoke City	621	52.23%	568	47.77%	0	0.00%	53	4.46%	1,189
Staunton City	771	59.31%	499	38.38%	30	2.31%	272	20.92%	1,300
Williamsburg City	116	39.59%	177	60.41%	0	0.00%	-61	-20.82%	293
Winchester City	472	46.14%	551	53.86%	0	0.00%	-79	-7.72%	1,023
Totals	145,497	51.05%	139,356	48.90%	130	0.05%	6,141	2.15%	284,983

== See also ==
- United States presidential elections in Virginia
