= 1880 United States presidential election in Virginia =

- November 2, 1880
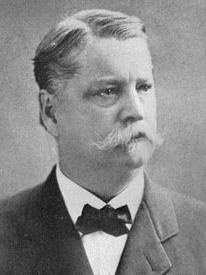

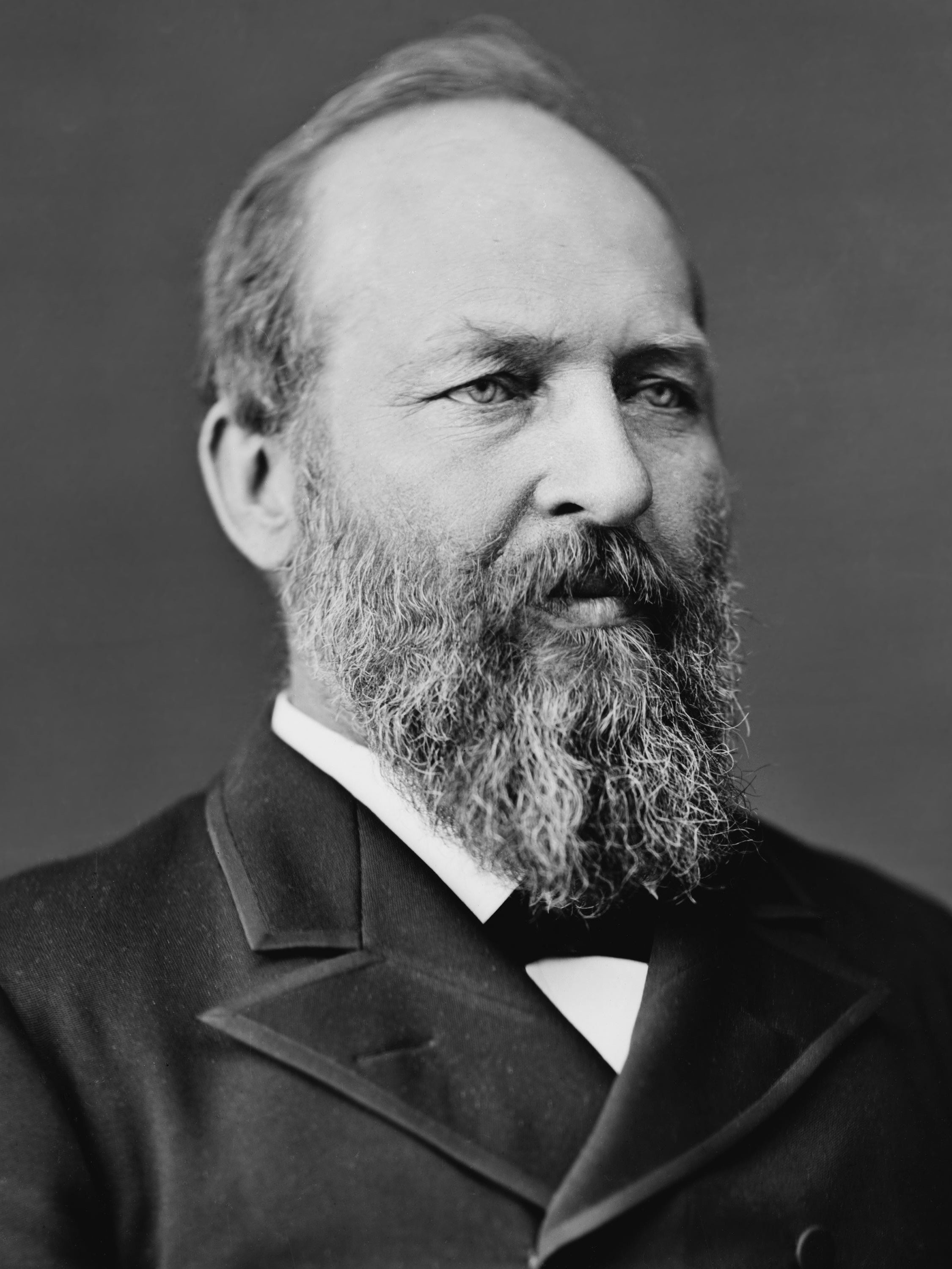

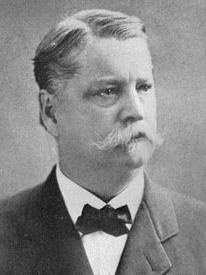
Nominee	Winfield Scott Hancock (Note: Two slates of electors were on the ballot in Virginia that were pledged to Winfield Hancock, one organized by the Democratic party, one by the Readjuster party. This was not a traditional multi-party nomination, and the two slates ran in opposition to each other as well as the Republican slate pledged to Garfield.)	James A. Garfield	Winfield Scott Hancock
Party	Democratic	Republican	Readjuster
Home state	Pennsylvania	Ohio	Pennsylvania
Running mate	William Hayden English	Chester A. Arthur	William Hayden English
Electoral vote	11	0	0
Popular vote	96,594	83,634	32,053
Percentage	45.50%	39.40%	15.10%

County and independent city results
Hancock (Dem.)
30-40%
40-50%
50–60%
60–70%
70–80%
80–90%
Garfield (Rep.)
30-40%
40-50%
50–60%
60–70%
70–80%
Hancock (Read.)
30-40%
40-50%
50–60%
60–70%
70–80%
President before election
Rutherford B. Hayes
Republican
Elected President
James A. Garfield
Republican

The 1880 United States presidential election in Virginia took place on November 2, 1880, as part of the 1880 United States presidential election. Voters chose 11 representatives, or electors, to the Electoral College, who voted for president and vice president.

Virginia voted for the Democratic candidate, Major General Winfield Scott Hancock over the Republican candidate, U.S. Representative James A. Garfield. Hancock won Virginia comfortably by a margin of 21.05 percent. This is the last time that the Democratic Party has carried Floyd County, which along with neighbouring Carroll County would be strong GOP counties in a Democrat-dominated state during the next seven decades.

While Hancock won the state, a split in the Democratic Party in Virginia over the payment of state debts led to two Democratic electoral slates being nominated, one by the regular debt-paying "Funder" Democrats, the other by the "Readjuster" or anti-debt paying faction of the party. Both slates were pledged to the Hancock ticket. The Readjuster ticket received 31,527 votes, but the Funder Democrats took 96,449 votes, enough to defeat the Republicans, whose slate had 84,020.

== Results ==
1880 United States presidential election in Virginia
Party	Candidate	Votes	Percentage	Electoral votes
Democratic	Winfield Scott Hancock	96,594	45.50%	11
Republican	James A. Garfield	83,634	39.40%	0
Readjuster	Winfield Scott Hancock	32,053	15.10%	0
Totals		212,281	100.0%	11

=== Results by county ===
1880 United States presidential election in Virginia by counties and independent cities
County or independent city	Winfield S. Hancock Democratic		James A. Garfield Republican		Winfield S. Hancock Readjuster		Margin		Total votes cast
County or independent city	#	%	#	%	#	%	#	%	Total votes cast
Accomack	1,863	55.56%	1,155	34.45%	335	9.99%	708	21.11%	3,353
Albemarle	1,818	44.60%	1,644	40.31%	614	15.06%	174	4.29%	4,076
Alexandria	263	34.88%	489	64.85%	2	0.27%	-226	-29.97%	754
Alleghany	260	54.62%	146	30.67%	70	14.71	114	23.95%	476
Amelia	279	20.04%	966	69.40%	147	10.56%	-687	-49.36%	1,392
Amherst	1,821	60.78%	1,058	35.21%	117	3.91%	763	25.57%	2,996
Appomattox	580	43.25%	460	34.30%	301	22.45%	120	8.95%	1,341
Augusta	2,644	60.71%	1,039	23.85%	672	15.43%	1,605	36.86%	4,355
Bath	200	41.24%	86	16.54%	199	41.03%	1	0.21%	485
Bedford	2,895	58.71%	1,888	38.29%	148	3.00%	1,007	20.42%	4,931
Bland	113	20.55%	60	10.87%	377	68.55%	-264	-48.00%	550
Botetourt	1,428	64.85%	596	27.07%	178	8.08%	832	37.78%	2,202
Brunswick	208	10.69%	1,160	59.64%	577	29.67%	-583	-29.97%	1,945
Buchanan	110	36.07%	33	10.82%	162	53.11%	-52	-17.04%	305
Buckingham	576	30.90%	842	45.17%	446	23.93%	-266	-14.27%	1,864
Campbell	1,678	56.42%	1,241	41.73%	55	1.85%	437	14.69%	2,974
Caroline	1,182	47.02%	1,172	46.62%	160	6.36%	10	0.40%	2,514
Carroll	1,199	70.95%	338	20.00%	153	9.05%	861	50.95%	1,690
Charles City	233	29.31%	464	58.36%	98	12.33%	-231	-29.05%	795
Charlotte	715	33.35%	1,190	55.50%	239	11.15%	-475	-22.15%	2,144
Chesterfield	1,020	46.47%%	955	43.51%	220	10.02%	65	3.16%	2,195
Clarke	1,013	71.89%	362	25.69%	34	2.41%	651	46.20%	1,409
Craig	332	80.39%	47	11.38%	34	8.23%	285	69.01%	413
Culpeper	1,094	49.04%	926	41.51%	211	9.46%	168	7.53%	2,231
Cumberland	418	28.85%	905	62.46%	126	8.70%	-487	-33.61%	1,449
Dickenson	13	5.63%	40	16.60%	178	77.06%	-138	-60.46%	231
Dinwiddie	396	23.38%	1,074	63.40%	224	13.22%	-678	-40.02%	1,694
Elizabeth City	468	28.19%	1,182	71.20%	10	0.60%	-714	-43.01%	1,660
Essex	692	41.61%	935	56.22%	36	2.16%	-243	-14.61%	1,663
Fairfax	1,512	48.38%	1,399	44.77%	214	6.85%	113	3.61%	3,125
Fauquier	2,420	63.89%	1,186	31.31%	182	4.80%	1,234	32.58%	3,788
Floyd	710	53.79%	345	26.14%	265	20.08%	365	27.65%	1,320
Fluvanna	392	41.70%	297	31.60%	251	26.70%	95	10.10%	940
Franklin	1,922	57.68%	855	25.66%	555	16.66%	1,067	32.02%	3,332
Frederick	1,384	68.41%	374	18.49%	265	13.10%	1,010	49.92%	2,023
Giles	589	57.07%	215	20.83%	228	22.09%	361	34.98%	1,032
Gloucester	698	42.82%	832	51.04%	100	6.13%	-134	-8.22%	1,630
Goochland	252	27.01%	480	51.45%	201	21.54%	-228	-24.44%	933
Grayson	716	46.02%	157	10.09%	683	43.89%	33	2.13%	1,556
Greene	275	32.09%	196	22.87%	386	45.04%	-111	-12.95%	857
Greensville	208	16.04%%	823	63.45%	266	20.51%	-557	-42.94%	1,297
Halifax	1,838	44.85%	1,987	48.49%	273	6.66%	-149	-3.64%	4,098
Hanover	1,179	50.58%	884	37.91%	268	11.58%	295	12.67%	2,331
Henrico	1,023	46.25%	1,032	46.65%	157	7.10%	-9	-0.40%	2,212
Henry	694	31.23%	938	42.21%	590	26.55%	-244	-10.98%	2,222
Highland	219	30.63%	75	10.49%	421	58.88%	-202	-28.25%	715
Isle of Wight	938	48.35%	733	37.78%	269	13.87%	205	10.57%	1,940
James City	99	16.53%	358	59.77%	142	23.71%	-216	-36.06%	599
King and Queen	656	46.82%	681	48.61%	64	4.57%	-25	-1.79%	1,401
King George	336	33.07%	514	50.59%	166	16.34%	-178	-17.52%	1,016
King William	531	36.15%	792	53.91%	146	9.94%	-261	-17.76%	1,469
Lancaster	462	40.21%	650	56.57%	37	3.22%	-188	-16.36%	1,149
Lee	684	39.74%	268	14.14%	769	44.68%	-85	-4.94%	1,721
Loudoun	2,635	57.63%	1,792	39.20%	145	3.17%	843	18.43%	4,572
Louisa	829	34.33%	1,230	50.93%	356	14.74%	-401	-16.60%	2,415
Lunenburg	261	17.47%	840	56.22%	393	26.31%	-447	-29.91%	1,494
Madison	740	46.28%	479	29.96%	380	23.76%	261	16.32%	1,599
Mathews	684	65.52%	286	27.39%	74	7.09%	398	38.13%	1,044
Mecklenburg	805	24.35%	2,179	65.91%	322	9.74%	-1,374	-41.56%	3,306
Middlesex	509	45.20%	614	54.53%	3	0.27%	-105	-9.33%	1,126
Montgomery	898	46.67%	601	31.08%	425	22.09%	297	15.59%	1,924
Nansemond	514	25.22%	958	47.01%	566	27.77%	-392	-19.24%	2,038
Nelson	1,417	57.79%	910	37.11%	125	5.10%	507	20.68%	2,452
New Kent	107	13.51%	361	45.58%	324	40.91%	-37	-4.67%	792
Norfolk	1,447	39.67%	2,047	56.11%	154	4.22%	-600	-16.44%	3,648
Northampton	722	42.07%	946	54.97%	48	2.80%	-224	-12.90%	1,716
Northumberland	684	52.82%	591	45.64%	20	1.54%	93	7.18%	1,295
Nottoway	129	8.91%	1,043	72.03%	276	19.06%	-767	-52.97%	1,448
Orange	958	48.12%	880	44.20%	153	7.68%	78	3.92%	1,991
Page	317	25.86%	149	12.15%	760	61.99%	-443	-36.13%	1,226
Patrick	767	50.23%	318	20.83%	442	28.95%	325	21.28%	1,527
Pittsylvania	3,180	52.92%	2,623	43.65%	206	3.43%	557	9.27%	6,009
Powhatan	220	19.84%	668	60.23%	221	19.93%	-447	-40.30%	1,109
Prince Edward	518	26.15%	1,106	55.83%	357	18.02%	-588	-29.68%	1,981
Prince George	284	20.20%	961	68.35%	161	11.45%	-677	-48.15%	1,406
Princess Anne	656	43.76%	604	40.29%	239	15.94%	52	3.47%	1,499
Prince William	1,095	69.39%	459	29.09%	24	1.52%	636	40.30%	1,578
Pulaski	579	48.25%	467	38.92%	154	12.83%	112	9.33%	1,200
Rappahannock	936	68.24%	379	27.68%	53	3.87%	557	40.56%	1,368
Richmond	514	43.45%	651	54.98%	18	1.52%	-137	-11.53%	1,183
Roanoke	695	41.44%	600	35.74%	382	22.78%	95	5.70%	1,677
Rockbridge	1,637	49.58%	951	28.80%	714	21.62%	686	20.78%	3,302
Rockingham	1,812	46.15%	690	17.58%	1,424	36.27%	388	9.88%	3,926
Russell	323	28.04%	190	16.44%	639	55.47%	-316	-27.43%	1,152
Scott	384	23.91%	519	28.85%	703	43.77%	-184	-14.92%	1,606
Shenandoah	1,433	45.96%	350	11.23%	1,335	42.82%	98	3.14%	3,118
Smyth	541	40.59%	202	14.96%	590	44.26%	-49	-3.67%	1,333
Southampton	979	29.74%	1,719	52.22%	594	18.04%	-740	-22.48%	3,292
Spotsylvania	505	37.49%	576	42.76%	266	19.75%	-71	-5.27%	1,347
Stafford	487	41.41%	268	22.79%	421	35.80%	66	5.61%	1,176
Surry	436	37.68%	682	58.95%	39	3.37%	-246	-21.27%	1,157
Sussex	390	20.73%	1,203	63.96%	288	15.31%	-813	-43.23%	1,881
Tazewell	678	44.49%	148	9.56%	698	45.80%	-20	-1.31%	1,524
Warren	920	81.13%	144	12.70%	70	6.17%	776	68.43%	1,134
Warwick	115	27.19%	287	67.85%	21	4.96%	-172	-40.66%	423
Washington	1,134	40.43%	573	20.40%	1,098	39.14%	36	1.29%	2,805
Westmoreland	478	40.30%	603	50.84%	105	8.85%	-125	-10.54%	1,186
Wise	217	33.59%	126	18.05%	303	46.90%	-86	-13.31%	646
Wythe	891	46.65%	382	20.00%	637	33.35%	254	13.30%	1,910
York	413	35.79%	691	59.88%	50	4.33%	-278	-24.09%	1,154
Alexandria (IC)	1,458	57.54%	994	39.23%	82	3.24%	464	18.31%	2,534
Danville (IC)	741	55.97%	575	43.43%	8	0.60%	166	12.54%	1,324
Fredericksburg (IC)	485	61.01%	272	34.21%	38	4.78%	213	26.80%	795
Lynchburg (IC)	1,375	60.81%	861	38.06%	25	1.11%	514	22.75%	2,261
Manchester (IC)	463	62.57%	226	30.54%	51	6.89%	237	32.03%	740
Norfolk (IC)	1,448	42.65%	1,383	40.74%	564	16.61%	65	1.91%	3,395
North Danville (IC)	139	59.15%	96	40.85%	0	0.00%	43	18.30%	235
Petersburg (IC)	1,045	30.86%	1,614	47.67%	726	21.45%	-569	-16.81%	3,385
Portsmouth (IC)	1,178	51.35%	1,024	44.64%	92	4.01%	154	6.71%	2,294
Richmond (IC)	4,945	65.88%	2,158	28.75%	403	5.37%	2,787	37.13%	7,506
Staunton (IC)	728	63.75%	361	31.61%	53	4.64%	367	32.14%	1,142
Williamsburg (IC)	58	24.79%	108	46.15%	68	29.06%	-40	-17.09%	234
Winchester (IC)	410	43.25%	392	41.35%	146	15.40%	18	1.90%	948
Totals	96,594	45.50%	83,634	39.30%	32,053	15.10%	12,960	6.10%	212,281

== See also ==
- United States presidential elections in Virginia
