= 1912 United States presidential election in Virginia =

- November 5, 1912

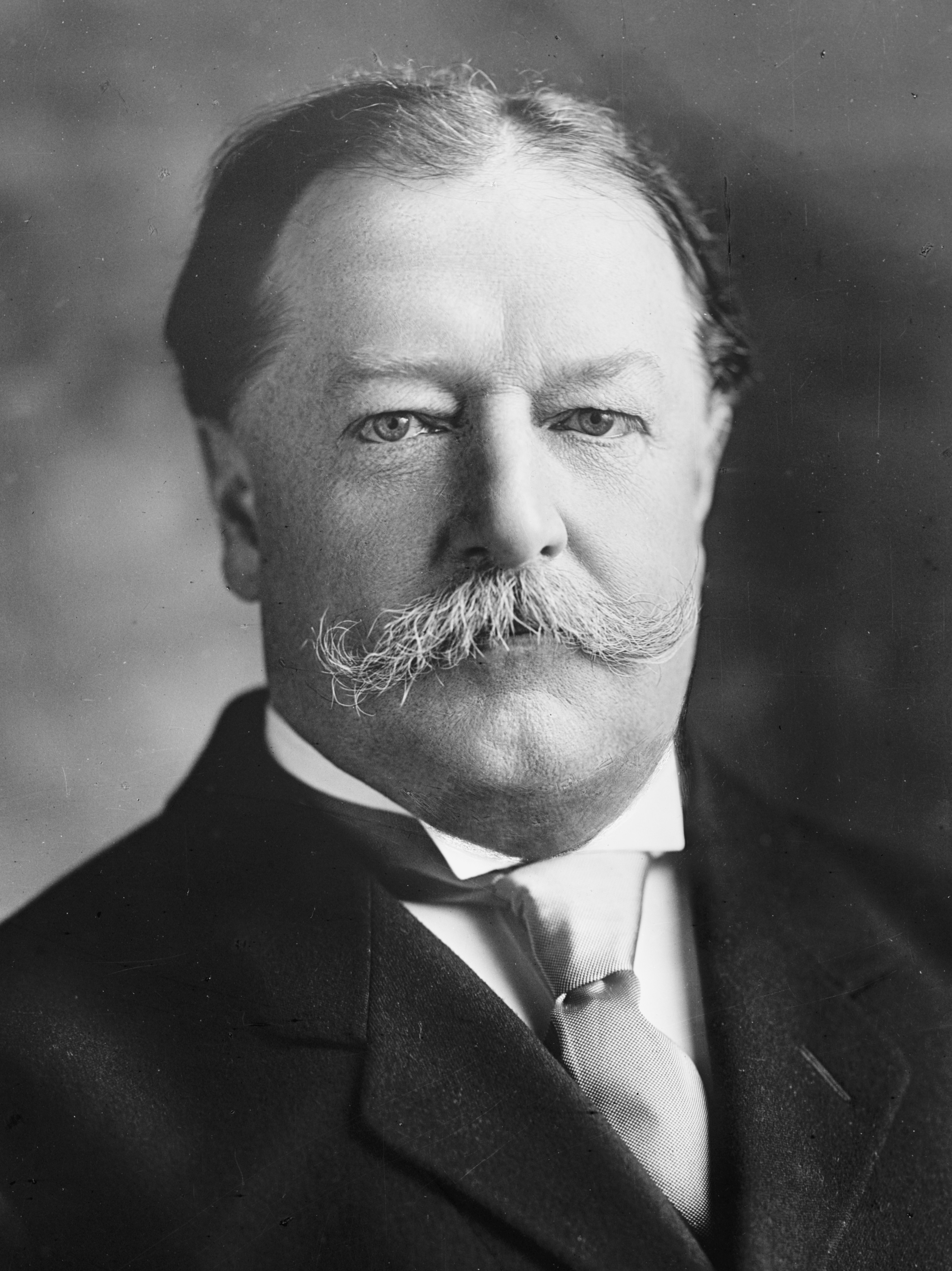

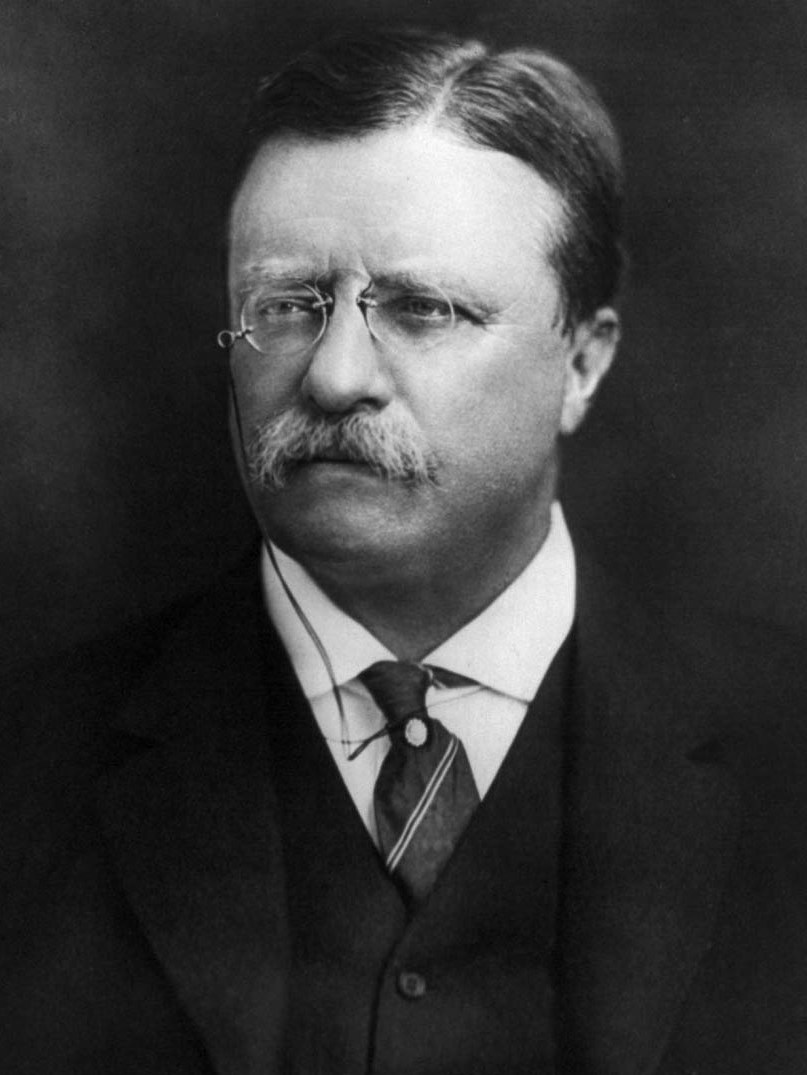
Nominee	Woodrow Wilson	William Howard Taft	Theodore Roosevelt
Party	Democratic	Republican	Progressive
Home state	New Jersey	Ohio	New York
Running mate	Thomas R. Marshall	Nicholas Murray Butler	Hiram W. Johnson
Electoral vote	12	0	0
Popular vote	90,332	23,288	21,777
Percentage	65.95%	17.00%	15.90%
County and independent city results
Wilson
30–40%
40–50%
50–60%
60–70%
70–80%
80–90%
90–100%
Taft
40–50%
Roosevelt
50–60%
President before election
William Howard Taft
Republican
Elected President
Woodrow Wilson
Democratic

The 1912 United States presidential election in Virginia took place on November 5, 1912. Voters chose 12 representatives, or electors to the Electoral College, who voted for president and vice president.

The 1900s had seen Virginia, like all former Confederate States, almost completely disenfranchise its black and poor white populations through the use of a cumulative poll tax and literacy tests. So severe was the disenfranchising effect of the new 1902 Constitution that the electorate for the 1904 presidential election was halved compared to that of previous elections, and it has been calculated that a third of those who voted were state employees and officeholders. The limited electorate meant Virginian politics was controlled by political machines — firstly one led by Thomas Staples Martin and after he died the Byrd Organization.

However, unlike the Deep South, historical fusion with the “Readjuster” Democrats, defection of substantial proportions of the Northeast-aligned white electorate of the Shenandoah Valley and Southwest Virginia over free silver, and an early move towards a “lily white” Jim Crow party meant that in general elections the Republicans retained around one-third of the small statewide electorate, with the majority of GOP support located in the western part of the state.

With the already minority state Republican Party divided between conservative incumbent President William Howard Taft and Progressive nominee, former President Theodore Roosevelt, it was clear that the gains Taft had long hoped for in the South would not be made at this election. Polls as early as July showed Virginia as completely safe for Democratic nominee and New Jersey Governor Wilson. By October it was widely believed that only a few dissident officeholders were behind the Progressive Party.

Ultimately Wilson won Virginia by 48.96 percentage points over Taft, with Roosevelt a close third. Wilson carried all but two counties, and won the largest popular-vote victory in Virginia since Andrew Jackson in 1832 — although Franklin D. Roosevelt would three times exceed his popular vote percentage. Wilson ultimately won the national election with 41.84 percent of the vote.

== Results ==
1912 United States presidential election in Virginia
Party	Candidate	Votes	Percentage	Electoral votes
Democratic	Woodrow Wilson	90,332	65.95%	12
Republican	William Howard Taft (inc.)	23,288	17.00%	0
Progressive	Theodore Roosevelt	21,777	15.90%	0
Socialist	Eugene V. Debs	820	0.60%	0
Prohibition	Eugene W. Chafin	709	0.52%	0
Socialist Labor	Arthur E. Reimer	50	0.04%	0
Totals		136,976	100.00%	12

=== Results by county ===
1912 United States presidential election in Virginia by counties and independent cities
County or city	Woodrow Wilson Democratic		William Howard Taft Republican		Theodore Roosevelt Progressive "Bull Moose"		Eugene V. Debs Socialist		Eugene W. Chafin Prohibition		Arthur E. Reimer Socialist Labor		Margin		Total votes cast
County or city	#	%	#	%	#	%	#	%	#	%	#	%	#	%	Total votes cast
Accomack County	1,825	86.33%	153	7.24%	110	5.20%	1	0.05%	25	1.18%	0	0.00%	1,672	79.09%	2,114
Albemarle County	1,215	80.84%	144	9.58%	126	8.38%	15	1.00%	3	0.20%	0	0.00%	1,071	71.26%	1,503
Alexandria County	394	48.70%	125	15.45%	263	32.51%	10	1.24%	15	1.85%	2	0.25%	131 (Note: In this county or city where Roosevelt ran second ahead of Taft, the margin given is Wilson vote minus Roosevelt vote.)	16.19%	809
Alleghany County	325	79.46%	32	7.82%	50	12.22%	0	0.00%	2	0.49%	0	0.00%	275	67.24%	409
Amelia County	765	85.28%	64	7.13%	60	6.69%	8	0.89%	0	0.00%	0	0.00%	701	78.15%	897
Amherst County	654	89.10%	28	3.81%	51	6.95%	0	0.00%	1	0.14%	0	0.00%	603	82.15%	734
Appomattox County	346	58.15%	86	14.45%	153	25.71%	8	1.34%	2	0.34%	0	0.00%	193	32.44%	595
Augusta County	1,556	62.74%	568	22.90%	272	10.97%	11	0.44%	73	2.94%	0	0.00%	988	39.84%	2,480
Bath County	329	60.48%	159	29.23%	39	7.17%	3	0.55%	11	2.02%	3	0.55%	170	31.25%	544
Bedford County	1,219	70.34%	142	8.19%	343	19.79%	9	0.52%	20	1.15%	0	0.00%	876	50.55%	1,733
Bland County	290	47.08%	206	33.44%	118	19.16%	1	0.16%	1	0.16%	0	0.00%	84	13.64%	616
Botetourt County	889	55.29%	517	32.15%	191	11.88%	2	0.12%	9	0.56%	0	0.00%	372	23.13%	1,608
Brunswick County	643	84.16%	67	8.77%	43	5.63%	5	0.65%	6	0.79%	0	0.00%	576	75.39%	764
Buchanan County	524	46.05%	223	19.60%	389	34.18%	0	0.00%	2	0.18%	0	0.00%	135	11.86%	1,138
Buckingham County	603	74.44%	97	11.98%	110	13.58%	0	0.00%	0	0.00%	0	0.00%	493	60.86%	810
Campbell County	810	77.00%	97	9.22%	126	11.98%	11	1.05%	8	0.76%	0	0.00%	684	65.02%	1,052
Caroline County	591	68.17%	144	16.61%	126	14.53%	0	0.00%	6	0.69%	0	0.00%	447	51.56%	867
Carroll County	765	38.48%	874	43.96%	346	17.40%	0	0.00%	3	0.15%	0	0.00%	-109	-5.48%	1,988
Charles City County	121	66.85%	37	20.44%	23	12.71%	0	0.00%	0	0.00%	0	0.00%	84	46.41%	181
Charlotte County	609	66.34%	175	19.06%	123	13.40%	10	1.09%	1	0.11%	0	0.00%	434	47.28%	918
Chesterfield County	702	82.78%	61	7.19%	75	8.84%	8	0.94%	2	0.24%	0	0.00%	627	73.94%	848
Clarke County	576	91.43%	39	6.19%	14	2.22%	1	0.16%	0	0.00%	0	0.00%	537	85.24%	630
Craig County	336	60.76%	62	11.21%	150	27.12%	1	0.18%	4	0.72%	0	0.00%	186	33.63%	553
Culpeper County	753	82.21%	108	11.79%	49	5.35%	1	0.11%	5	0.55%	0	0.00%	645	70.41%	916
Cumberland County	362	89.60%	10	2.48%	31	7.67%	1	0.25%	0	0.00%	0	0.00%	331	81.93%	404
Dickenson County	529	48.58%	398	36.55%	157	14.42%	5	0.46%	0	0.00%	0	0.00%	131	12.03%	1,089
Dinwiddie County	512	78.65%	58	8.91%	75	11.52%	1	0.15%	3	0.46%	2	0.31%	437	67.13%	651
Elizabeth City County	347	75.60%	43	9.37%	56	12.20%	8	1.74%	1	0.22%	4	0.87%	291	63.40%	459
Essex County	278	77.01%	72	19.94%	11	3.05%	0	0.00%	0	0.00%	0	0.00%	206	57.06%	361
Fairfax County	992	74.14%	187	13.98%	150	11.21%	6	0.45%	3	0.22%	0	0.00%	805	60.16%	1,338
Fauquier County	1,187	81.25%	182	12.46%	87	5.95%	2	0.14%	3	0.21%	0	0.00%	1,005	68.79%	1,461
Floyd County	409	30.05%	222	16.31%	712	52.31%	5	0.37%	13	0.96%	0	0.00%	-303	-22.26%	1,361
Fluvanna County	409	77.90%	53	10.10%	58	11.05%	5	0.95%	0	0.00%	0	0.00%	351	66.86%	525
Franklin County	1,238	54.73%	415	18.35%	601	26.57%	5	0.22%	3	0.13%	0	0.00%	637	28.16%	2,262
Frederick County	922	74.66%	181	14.66%	112	9.07%	3	0.24%	16	1.30%	1	0.08%	741	60.00%	1,235
Giles County	725	58.19%	267	21.43%	247	19.82%	4	0.32%	3	0.24%	0	0.00%	458	36.76%	1,246
Gloucester County	510	79.69%	74	11.56%	56	8.75%	0	0.00%	0	0.00%	0	0.00%	436	68.13%	640
Goochland County	322	61.45%	114	21.76%	82	15.65%	6	1.15%	0	0.00%	0	0.00%	208	39.69%	524
Grayson County	850	43.06%	832	42.15%	290	14.69%	1	0.05%	1	0.05%	0	0.00%	18	0.91%	1,974
Greene County	238	49.69%	141	29.44%	95	19.83%	0	0.00%	5	1.04%	0	0.00%	97	20.25%	479
Greensville County	294	73.32%	31	7.73%	72	17.96%	1	0.25%	3	0.75%	0	0.00%	222	55.36%	401
Halifax County	1,260	68.63%	426	23.20%	127	6.92%	15	0.82%	8	0.44%	0	0.00%	834	45.42%	1,836
Hanover County	609	86.75%	87	12.39%	4	0.57%	0	0.00%	2	0.28%	0	0.00%	522	74.36%	702
Henrico County	952	81.02%	93	7.91%	105	8.94%	16	1.36%	6	0.51%	3	0.26%	847	72.09%	1,175
Henry County	707	54.26%	216	16.58%	369	28.32%	8	0.61%	3	0.23%	0	0.00%	338	25.94%	1,303
Highland County	313	49.53%	221	34.97%	84	13.29%	0	0.00%	14	2.22%	0	0.00%	92	14.56%	632
Isle of Wight County	708	80.09%	75	8.48%	101	11.43%	0	0.00%	0	0.00%	0	0.00%	607	68.67%	884
James City County	128	82.05%	10	6.41%	15	9.62%	1	0.64%	2	1.28%	0	0.00%	113	72.44%	156
King and Queen County	246	67.96%	68	18.78%	48	13.26%	0	0.00%	0	0.00%	0	0.00%	178	49.17%	362
King George County	256	62.90%	48	11.79%	103	25.31%	0	0.00%	0	0.00%	0	0.00%	153	37.59%	407
King William County	305	69.48%	69	15.72%	63	14.35%	1	0.23%	1	0.23%	0	0.00%	236	53.76%	439
Lancaster County	479	82.02%	82	14.04%	16	2.74%	1	0.17%	6	1.03%	0	0.00%	397	67.98%	584
Lee County	1,023	44.13%	699	30.16%	577	24.89%	9	0.39%	10	0.43%	0	0.00%	324	13.98%	2,318
Loudoun County	1,386	78.39%	256	14.48%	87	4.92%	4	0.23%	35	1.98%	0	0.00%	1,130	63.91%	1,768
Louisa County	582	70.63%	91	11.04%	141	17.11%	6	0.73%	4	0.49%	0	0.00%	441	53.52%	824
Lunenburg County	508	80.89%	66	10.51%	50	7.96%	4	0.64%	0	0.00%	0	0.00%	442	70.38%	628
Madison County	402	59.38%	210	31.02%	63	9.31%	1	0.15%	1	0.15%	0	0.00%	192	28.36%	677
Mathews County	523	86.88%	45	7.48%	34	5.65%	0	0.00%	0	0.00%	0	0.00%	478	79.40%	602
Mecklenburg County	1,039	78.30%	191	14.39%	91	6.86%	1	0.08%	5	0.38%	0	0.00%	848	63.90%	1,327
Middlesex County	374	71.37%	128	24.43%	22	4.20%	0	0.00%	0	0.00%	0	0.00%	246	46.95%	524
Montgomery County	684	42.86%	349	21.87%	531	33.27%	2	0.13%	27	1.69%	3	0.19%	153	9.59%	1,596
Nansemond County	544	81.56%	53	7.95%	65	9.75%	2	0.30%	3	0.45%	0	0.00%	479	71.81%	667
Nelson County	706	72.71%	163	16.79%	95	9.78%	5	0.51%	2	0.21%	0	0.00%	543	55.92%	971
New Kent County	160	67.51%	30	12.66%	46	19.41%	0	0.00%	1	0.42%	0	0.00%	114	48.10%	237
Norfolk County	1,089	62.44%	422	24.20%	215	12.33%	11	0.63%	4	0.23%	3	0.17%	667	38.25%	1,744
Northampton County	726	81.94%	83	9.37%	76	8.58%	1	0.11%	0	0.00%	0	0.00%	643	72.57%	886
Northumberland County	471	75.36%	102	16.32%	52	8.32%	0	0.00%	0	0.00%	0	0.00%	369	59.04%	625
Nottoway County	683	81.70%	72	8.61%	70	8.37%	4	0.48%	7	0.84%	0	0.00%	611	73.09%	836
Orange County	619	80.92%	87	11.37%	57	7.45%	0	0.00%	2	0.26%	0	0.00%	532	69.54%	765
Page County	705	57.88%	339	27.83%	138	11.33%	10	0.82%	26	2.13%	0	0.00%	366	30.05%	1,218
Patrick County	698	46.85%	434	29.13%	350	23.49%	3	0.20%	4	0.27%	1	0.07%	264	17.72%	1,490
Pittsylvania County	1,558	64.22%	527	21.72%	321	13.23%	15	0.62%	5	0.21%	0	0.00%	1,031	42.50%	2,426
Powhatan County	230	56.93%	109	26.98%	51	12.62%	11	2.72%	3	0.74%	0	0.00%	121	29.95%	404
Prince Edward County	584	83.07%	72	10.24%	46	6.54%	0	0.00%	1	0.14%	0	0.00%	512	72.83%	703
Prince George County	204	69.15%	42	14.24%	48	16.27%	1	0.34%	0	0.00%	0	0.00%	156	52.88%	295
Prince William County	423	74.60%	40	7.05%	93	16.40%	5	0.88%	6	1.06%	0	0.00%	330	58.20%	567
Princess Anne County	814	84.88%	82	8.55%	63	6.57%	0	0.00%	0	0.00%	0	0.00%	732	76.33%	959
Pulaski County	781	52.88%	196	13.27%	484	32.77%	13	0.88%	3	0.20%	0	0.00%	297	20.11%	1,477
Rappahannock County	356	75.11%	94	19.83%	9	1.90%	13	2.74%	2	0.42%	0	0.00%	262	55.27%	474
Richmond County	342	69.51%	110	22.36%	40	8.13%	0	0.00%	0	0.00%	0	0.00%	232	47.15%	492
Roanoke County	696	68.30%	108	10.60%	191	18.74%	9	0.88%	15	1.47%	0	0.00%	505	49.56%	1,019
Rockbridge County	949	58.76%	433	26.81%	212	13.13%	13	0.80%	7	0.43%	1	0.06%	516	31.95%	1,615
Rockingham County	1,764	55.23%	937	29.34%	421	13.18%	25	0.78%	47	1.47%	0	0.00%	827	25.89%	3,194
Russell County	1,298	51.53%	588	23.34%	623	24.73%	6	0.24%	4	0.16%	0	0.00%	675	26.80%	2,519
Scott County	1,311	44.26%	557	18.80%	1,075	36.29%	12	0.41%	6	0.20%	1	0.03%	236	7.97%	2,962
Shenandoah County	1,336	52.25%	706	27.61%	493	19.28%	7	0.27%	12	0.47%	3	0.12%	630	24.64%	2,557
Smyth County	1,022	46.08%	609	27.46%	578	26.06%	6	0.27%	3	0.14%	0	0.00%	413	18.62%	2,218
Southampton County	861	85.00%	95	9.38%	49	4.84%	0	0.00%	8	0.79%	0	0.00%	766	75.62%	1,013
Spotsylvania County	389	63.15%	58	9.42%	158	25.65%	0	0.00%	11	1.79%	0	0.00%	231	37.50%	616
Stafford County	347	51.56%	141	20.95%	183	27.19%	2	0.30%	0	0.00%	0	0.00%	164	24.37%	673
Surry County	360	77.42%	57	12.26%	37	7.96%	6	1.29%	5	1.08%	0	0.00%	303	65.16%	465
Sussex County	435	77.54%	59	10.52%	53	9.45%	0	0.00%	14	2.50%	0	0.00%	376	67.02%	561
Tazewell County	979	39.76%	586	23.80%	871	35.38%	19	0.77%	7	0.28%	0	0.00%	108	4.39%	2,462
Warren County	571	77.16%	122	16.49%	39	5.27%	2	0.27%	6	0.81%	0	0.00%	449	60.68%	740
Warwick County	123	71.51%	17	9.88%	30	17.44%	1	0.58%	0	0.00%	1	0.58%	93	54.07%	172
Washington County	1,721	51.92%	590	17.80%	996	30.05%	4	0.12%	4	0.12%	0	0.00%	725	21.87%	3,315
Westmoreland County	341	74.95%	69	15.16%	43	9.45%	2	0.44%	0	0.00%	0	0.00%	272	59.78%	455
Wise County	1,279	46.71%	851	31.08%	573	20.93%	34	1.24%	1	0.04%	0	0.00%	428	15.63%	2,738
Wythe County	1,110	46.27%	633	26.39%	650	27.09%	5	0.21%	1	0.04%	0	0.00%	460	19.17%	2,399
York County	211	76.17%	34	12.27%	26	9.39%	3	1.08%	3	1.08%	0	0.00%	177	63.90%	277
Alexandria City	951	79.18%	132	10.99%	104	8.66%	11	0.92%	2	0.17%	1	0.08%	819	68.19%	1,201
Bristol City	405	71.55%	86	15.19%	64	11.31%	8	1.41%	3	0.53%	0	0.00%	319	56.36%	566
Buena Vista City	155	60.31%	43	16.73%	48	18.68%	8	3.11%	3	1.17%	0	0.00%	107	41.63%	257
Charlottesville City	454	86.97%	39	7.47%	24	4.60%	4	0.77%	1	0.19%	0	0.00%	415	79.50%	522
Clifton Forge City	293	64.68%	63	13.91%	61	13.47%	34	7.51%	1	0.22%	1	0.22%	230	50.77%	453
Danville City	1,066	84.60%	93	7.38%	79	6.27%	11	0.87%	7	0.56%	4	0.32%	973	77.22%	1,260
Fredericksburg City	414	73.14%	51	9.01%	100	17.67%	0	0.00%	1	0.18%	0	0.00%	314	55.48%	566
Hampton City	353	88.47%	13	3.26%	31	7.77%	1	0.25%	1	0.25%	0	0.00%	322	80.70%	399
Lynchburg City	1,487	80.82%	111	6.03%	218	11.85%	19	1.03%	5	0.27%	0	0.00%	1,269	68.97%	1,840
Newport News City	938	70.58%	100	7.52%	231	17.38%	53	3.99%	3	0.23%	4	0.30%	707	53.20%	1,329
Norfolk City	3,539	83.70%	195	4.61%	451	10.67%	33	0.78%	10	0.24%	0	0.00%	3,088	73.04%	4,228
Petersburg City	1,122	90.19%	75	6.03%	44	3.54%	2	0.16%	1	0.08%	0	0.00%	1,047	84.16%	1,244
Portsmouth City	1,529	79.02%	64	3.31%	321	16.59%	16	0.83%	1	0.05%	4	0.21%	1,208	62.43%	1,935
Radford City	183	56.13%	36	11.04%	95	29.14%	8	2.45%	4	1.23%	0	0.00%	88	26.99%	326
Richmond City	5,636	85.05%	405	6.11%	483	7.29%	91	1.37%	10	0.15%	2	0.03%	5,153	77.76%	6,627
Roanoke City	1,913	69.74%	268	9.77%	502	18.30%	39	1.42%	16	0.58%	5	0.18%	1,411	51.44%	2,743
Staunton City	632	64.23%	65	6.61%	287	29.17%	0	0.00%	0	0.00%	0	0.00%	345	35.06%	984
Suffolk City	480	75.83%	71	11.22%	63	9.95%	2	0.32%	17	2.69%	0	0.00%	409	64.61%	633
Williamsburg City	113	81.29%	11	7.91%	14	10.07%	0	0.00%	1	0.72%	0	0.00%	99	71.22%	139
Winchester City	447	66.03%	141	20.83%	63	9.31%	3	0.44%	22	3.25%	1	0.15%	306	45.20%	677
Totals	90,354	65.95%	23,287	17.00%	21,776	15.90%	820	0.60%	709	0.52%	50	0.04%	67,067	48.96%	136,996

== See also ==
- United States presidential elections in Virginia
