= 1920 United States presidential election in Virginia =

- November 2, 1920

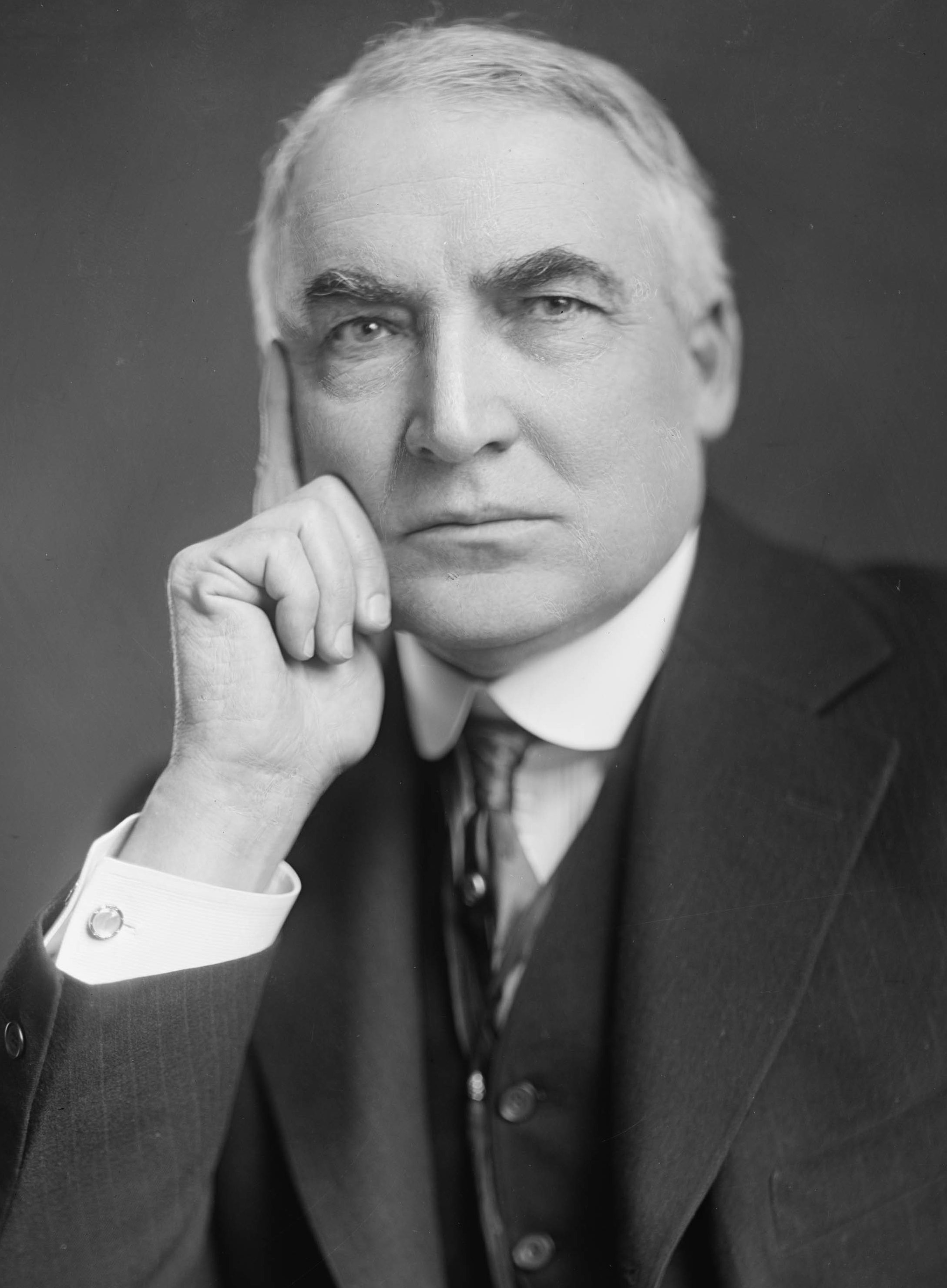
Nominee	James M. Cox	Warren G. Harding
Party	Democratic	Republican
Home state	Ohio	Ohio
Running mate	Franklin D. Roosevelt	Calvin Coolidge
Electoral vote	12	0
Popular vote	141,670	87,456
Percentage	61.32%	37.85%
County and independent city results
Cox
50–60%
60–70%
70–80%
80–90%
Harding
50–60%
60–70%
70–80%
President before election
Woodrow Wilson
Democratic
Elected President
Warren G. Harding
Republican

The 1920 United States presidential election in Virginia took place on November 2, 1920. Voters chose twelve representatives, or electors, to the Electoral College, who voted for president and vice president. This was also the first presidential election after the passage of the Nineteenth Amendment, which granted women the right to vote throughout the United States, including Virginia.

The 1900s decade had seen Virginia, like all former Confederate States, almost completely disenfranchise its black and poor white populations through the use of a cumulative poll tax and literacy tests. So severe was the disenfranchising effect of the new 1902 Constitution that the electorate for the 1904 presidential election was halved compared to that of previous elections, and it has been calculated that a third of those who voted were state employees and officeholders.

This limited electorate meant Virginian politics was controlled by political machines based in Southside Virginia — firstly one led by Thomas Staples Martin and after he died the Byrd Organization. Progressive “antiorganization” factions were rendered impotent by the inability of almost all of their potential electorate to vote. Unlike the Deep South, historical fusion with the “Readjuster” Democrats, defection of substantial proportions of the Northeast-aligned white electorate of the Shenandoah Valley and Southwest Virginia over free silver, and an early move towards a “lily white” Jim Crow party meant that in general elections the Republicans retained around one-third of the small statewide electorate, with the majority of GOP support located in the western part of the state. However, in many parts of the state — like in Tennessee during the same period — the parties avoided competition by an agreed division over local offices.

Unlike North Carolina, Tennessee or Oklahoma — the other Southern states with the rudiments of a two-party system like typically contested statewide general elections — Virginia was influenced neither by Appalachian or Ozark isolationism nor the Nineteenth Amendment. Virginia had not given women suffrage at any level before 1920, and in February the State House of Delegates rejected the Nineteenth Amendment by 62 to 22 and the state's Senate rejected it by a vote of 24 to 10. There were efforts to have women's suffrage subject to a referendum and an amendment to the state constitution after it was rejected by the legislature, but the idea was never carried out.

Neither Republican nominee, Ohio Senator Warren G. Harding nor Democratic nominee, former Ohio Governor James M. Cox campaigned in the state. Unlike Oklahoma, Tennessee and to a much lesser extent North Carolina, there never was a thought that Virginia would be vulnerable to an expected and observed Republican landslide that saw Harding win the national election with 60.32 percent of the vote. Cox would win Virginia by a margin of 23.47 percentage points — a decrease vis-à-vis Woodrow Wilson's results in the two previous elections, but much less than the Democratic Party experienced nationally.

== Results ==
1920 United States presidential election in Virginia
Party	Candidate	Votes	Percentage	Electoral votes
Democratic	James M. Cox	141,670	61.32%	12
Republican	Warren G. Harding	87,456	37.85%	0
Prohibition	Aaron S. Watkins	857	0.37%	0
Socialist	Eugene V. Debs	807	0.35%	0
Farmer–Labor	Parley P. Christensen	243	0.11%	0
Totals		231,033	100.00%	12

=== Results by county ===
1920 United States presidential election in Virginia by counties and independent cities
County or independent city	James M. Cox Democratic		Warren G. Harding Republican		Aaron S. Watkins Prohibition		Eugene V. Debs Socialist		Parley P. Christensen Farmer–Labor		Margin		Total votes cast
County or independent city	#	%	#	%	#	%	#	%	#	%	#	%	Total votes cast
Accomack County	2,026	81.69%	409	16.49%	44	1.77%	1	0.04%	0	0.00%	1,617	65.20%	2,480
Albemarle County	1,587	74.58%	541	25.42%	0	0.00%	0	0.00%	0	0.00%	1,046	49.15%	2,128
Alleghany County	663	46.79%	736	51.94%	10	0.71%	6	0.42%	2	0.14%	-73	-5.15%	1,417
Amelia County	389	67.77%	179	31.18%	3	0.52%	3	0.52%	0	0.00%	210	36.59%	574
Amherst County	1,094	86.14%	168	13.23%	1	0.08%	7	0.55%	0	0.00%	926	72.91%	1,270
Appomattox County	837	81.10%	190	18.41%	5	0.48%	0	0.00%	0	0.00%	647	62.69%	1,032
Arlington County	835	44.65%	997	53.32%	10	0.53%	17	0.91%	11	0.59%	-162	-8.66%	1,870
Augusta County	2,106	54.29%	1,707	44.01%	49	1.26%	14	0.36%	3	0.08%	399	10.29%	3,879
Bath County	343	48.31%	362	50.99%	2	0.28%	1	0.14%	2	0.28%	-19	-2.68%	710
Bedford County	1,774	74.51%	583	24.49%	15	0.63%	6	0.25%	3	0.13%	1,191	50.02%	2,381
Bland County	403	45.74%	478	54.26%	0	0.00%	0	0.00%	0	0.00%	-75	-8.51%	881
Botetourt County	1,331	51.71%	1,240	48.17%	3	0.12%	0	0.00%	0	0.00%	91	3.54%	2,574
Brunswick County	866	87.04%	125	12.56%	0	0.00%	4	0.40%	0	0.00%	741	74.47%	995
Buchanan County	675	38.46%	1,078	61.42%	0	0.00%	1	0.06%	1	0.06%	-403	-22.96%	1,755
Buckingham County	749	70.53%	311	29.28%	0	0.00%	0	0.00%	2	0.19%	438	41.24%	1,062
Campbell County	1,341	77.16%	375	21.58%	12	0.69%	4	0.23%	6	0.35%	966	55.58%	1,738
Caroline County	665	67.58%	308	31.30%	9	0.91%	2	0.20%	0	0.00%	357	36.28%	984
Carroll County	1,265	33.37%	2,520	66.47%	4	0.11%	2	0.05%	0	0.00%	-1,255	-33.10%	3,791
Charles City County	119	58.91%	82	40.59%	1	0.50%	0	0.00%	0	0.00%	37	18.32%	202
Charlotte County	1,266	77.48%	364	22.28%	4	0.24%	0	0.00%	0	0.00%	902	55.20%	1,634
Chesterfield County	964	75.37%	302	23.61%	3	0.23%	3	0.23%	7	0.55%	662	51.76%	1,279
Clarke County	774	79.30%	154	15.78%	25	2.56%	11	1.13%	12	1.23%	620	63.52%	976
Craig County	381	54.51%	315	45.06%	2	0.29%	1	0.14%	0	0.00%	66	9.44%	699
Culpeper County	973	74.50%	330	25.27%	3	0.23%	0	0.00%	0	0.00%	643	49.23%	1,306
Cumberland County	413	77.78%	114	21.47%	4	0.75%	0	0.00%	0	0.00%	299	56.31%	531
Dickenson County	903	45.38%	1,067	53.62%	3	0.15%	17	0.85%	0	0.00%	-164	-8.24%	1,990
Dinwiddie County	636	77.18%	186	22.57%	1	0.12%	0	0.00%	1	0.12%	450	54.61%	824
Elizabeth City County	675	58.80%	439	38.24%	10	0.87%	19	1.66%	5	0.44%	236	20.56%	1,148
Essex County	319	75.95%	101	24.05%	0	0.00%	0	0.00%	0	0.00%	218	51.90%	420
Fairfax County	1,598	61.06%	987	37.71%	17	0.65%	10	0.38%	5	0.19%	611	23.35%	2,617
Fauquier County	1,365	70.32%	568	29.26%	7	0.36%	0	0.00%	1	0.05%	797	41.06%	1,941
Floyd County	497	26.65%	1,355	72.65%	5	0.27%	7	0.38%	1	0.05%	-858	-46.01%	1,865
Fluvanna County	562	78.38%	146	20.36%	2	0.28%	6	0.84%	1	0.14%	416	58.02%	717
Franklin County	1,765	56.01%	1,381	43.83%	1	0.03%	2	0.06%	2	0.06%	384	12.19%	3,151
Frederick County	1,337	59.79%	875	39.13%	16	0.72%	6	0.27%	2	0.09%	462	20.66%	2,236
Giles County	1,104	55.56%	877	44.14%	5	0.25%	0	0.00%	1	0.05%	227	11.42%	1,987
Gloucester County	677	69.87%	283	29.21%	8	0.83%	1	0.10%	0	0.00%	394	40.66%	969
Goochland County	384	63.79%	212	35.22%	2	0.33%	4	0.66%	0	0.00%	172	28.57%	602
Grayson County	1,781	45.27%	2,153	54.73%	0	0.00%	0	0.00%	0	0.00%	-372	-9.46%	3,934
Greene County	306	42.27%	414	57.18%	2	0.28%	0	0.00%	2	0.28%	-108	-14.92%	724
Greensville County	424	78.81%	111	20.63%	2	0.37%	1	0.19%	0	0.00%	313	58.18%	538
Halifax County	2,103	77.98%	586	21.73%	6	0.22%	1	0.04%	1	0.04%	1,517	56.25%	2,697
Hanover County	903	79.70%	224	19.77%	3	0.26%	0	0.00%	3	0.26%	679	59.93%	1,133
Henrico County	1,078	74.19%	338	23.26%	6	0.41%	23	1.58%	8	0.55%	740	50.93%	1,453
Henry County	871	54.95%	698	44.04%	10	0.63%	3	0.19%	3	0.19%	173	10.91%	1,585
Highland County	379	44.22%	474	55.31%	3	0.35%	0	0.00%	1	0.12%	-95	-11.09%	857
Isle of Wight County	759	75.52%	245	24.38%	1	0.10%	0	0.00%	0	0.00%	514	51.14%	1,005
James City County	207	76.38%	61	22.51%	2	0.74%	1	0.37%	0	0.00%	146	53.87%	271
King and Queen County	347	65.72%	181	34.28%	0	0.00%	0	0.00%	0	0.00%	166	31.44%	528
King George County	249	49.50%	253	50.30%	1	0.20%	0	0.00%	0	0.00%	-4	-0.80%	503
King William County	353	65.98%	176	32.90%	5	0.93%	1	0.19%	0	0.00%	177	33.08%	535
Lancaster County	404	73.99%	138	25.27%	4	0.73%	0	0.00%	0	0.00%	266	48.72%	546
Lee County	1,592	42.33%	2,162	57.48%	1	0.03%	4	0.11%	2	0.05%	-570	-15.16%	3,761
Loudoun County	1,720	68.64%	757	30.21%	16	0.64%	7	0.28%	6	0.24%	963	38.43%	2,506
Louisa County	684	68.20%	312	31.11%	2	0.20%	4	0.40%	1	0.10%	372	37.09%	1,003
Lunenburg County	818	78.96%	208	20.08%	1	0.10%	9	0.87%	0	0.00%	610	58.88%	1,036
Madison County	499	53.03%	431	45.80%	10	1.06%	0	0.00%	1	0.11%	68	7.23%	941
Mathews County	624	72.90%	216	25.23%	14	1.64%	0	0.00%	2	0.23%	408	47.66%	856
Mecklenburg County	1,619	85.66%	264	13.97%	6	0.32%	1	0.05%	0	0.00%	1,355	71.69%	1,890
Middlesex County	438	71.92%	170	27.91%	0	0.00%	1	0.16%	0	0.00%	268	44.01%	609
Montgomery County	969	44.92%	1,160	53.78%	27	1.25%	1	0.05%	0	0.00%	-191	-8.85%	2,157
Nansemond County	690	73.95%	243	26.05%	0	0.00%	0	0.00%	0	0.00%	447	47.91%	933
Nelson County	973	71.18%	392	28.68%	0	0.00%	1	0.07%	1	0.07%	581	42.50%	1,367
New Kent County	190	63.55%	109	36.45%	0	0.00%	0	0.00%	0	0.00%	81	27.09%	299
Norfolk County	1,824	68.26%	813	30.43%	9	0.34%	16	0.60%	10	0.37%	1,011	37.84%	2,672
Northampton County	954	80.98%	217	18.42%	7	0.59%	0	0.00%	0	0.00%	737	62.56%	1,178
Northumberland County	536	70.25%	221	28.96%	4	0.52%	1	0.13%	1	0.13%	315	41.28%	763
Nottoway County	821	84.21%	154	15.79%	0	0.00%	0	0.00%	0	0.00%	667	68.41%	975
Orange County	718	73.49%	258	26.41%	1	0.10%	0	0.00%	0	0.00%	460	47.08%	977
Page County	846	42.68%	1,126	56.81%	4	0.20%	5	0.25%	1	0.05%	-280	-14.13%	1,982
Patrick County	1,154	48.35%	1,230	51.53%	3	0.13%	0	0.00%	0	0.00%	-76	-3.18%	2,387
Pittsylvania County	2,715	69.69%	1,162	29.83%	10	0.26%	7	0.18%	2	0.05%	1,553	39.86%	3,896
Powhatan County	263	64.78%	140	34.48%	0	0.00%	2	0.49%	1	0.25%	123	30.30%	406
Prince Edward County	774	80.21%	189	19.59%	1	0.10%	1	0.10%	0	0.00%	585	60.62%	965
Prince George County	375	74.11%	127	25.10%	3	0.59%	0	0.00%	1	0.20%	248	49.01%	506
Prince William County	786	66.55%	393	33.28%	2	0.17%	0	0.00%	0	0.00%	393	33.28%	1,181
Princess Anne County	610	84.96%	105	14.62%	2	0.28%	0	0.00%	1	0.14%	505	70.33%	718
Pulaski County	1,814	51.37%	1,710	48.43%	6	0.17%	1	0.03%	0	0.00%	104	2.95%	3,531
Rappahannock County	418	66.35%	210	33.33%	0	0.00%	2	0.32%	0	0.00%	208	33.02%	630
Richmond County	321	60.91%	206	39.09%	0	0.00%	0	0.00%	0	0.00%	115	21.82%	527
Roanoke County	1,286	56.35%	955	41.85%	21	0.92%	14	0.61%	6	0.26%	331	14.50%	2,282
Rockbridge County	1,365	56.13%	1,054	43.34%	8	0.33%	3	0.12%	2	0.08%	311	12.79%	2,432
Rockingham County	2,068	45.07%	2,464	53.71%	42	0.92%	13	0.28%	1	0.02%	-396	-8.63%	4,588
Russell County	1,704	48.95%	1,772	50.90%	2	0.06%	1	0.03%	2	0.06%	-68	-1.95%	3,481
Scott County	1,671	40.49%	2,449	59.34%	0	0.00%	5	0.12%	2	0.05%	-778	-18.85%	4,127
Shenandoah County	2,077	43.39%	2,683	56.05%	17	0.36%	9	0.19%	1	0.02%	-606	-12.66%	4,787
Smyth County	1,516	44.41%	1,883	55.16%	6	0.18%	7	0.21%	2	0.06%	-367	-10.75%	3,414
Southampton County	1,314	83.06%	250	15.80%	18	1.14%	0	0.00%	0	0.00%	1,064	67.26%	1,582
Spotsylvania County	440	52.76%	380	45.56%	7	0.84%	1	0.12%	6	0.72%	60	7.19%	834
Stafford County	459	43.30%	599	56.51%	2	0.19%	0	0.00%	0	0.00%	-140	-13.21%	1,060
Surry County	397	80.69%	92	18.70%	2	0.41%	1	0.20%	0	0.00%	305	61.99%	492
Sussex County	548	76.43%	166	23.15%	2	0.28%	1	0.14%	0	0.00%	382	53.28%	717
Tazewell County	1,770	42.27%	2,408	57.51%	2	0.05%	6	0.14%	1	0.02%	-638	-15.24%	4,187
Warren County	720	69.63%	293	28.34%	18	1.74%	2	0.19%	1	0.10%	427	41.30%	1,034
Warwick County	152	56.93%	109	40.82%	0	0.00%	5	1.87%	1	0.37%	43	16.10%	267
Washington County	2,251	45.61%	2,672	54.14%	5	0.10%	6	0.12%	1	0.02%	-421	-8.53%	4,935
Westmoreland County	396	74.72%	133	25.09%	1	0.19%	0	0.00%	0	0.00%	263	49.62%	530
Wise County	2,587	44.20%	3,236	55.29%	2	0.03%	25	0.43%	3	0.05%	-649	-11.09%	5,853
Wythe County	1,465	40.90%	2,104	58.74%	11	0.31%	1	0.03%	1	0.03%	-639	-17.84%	3,582
York County	281	74.54%	92	24.40%	3	0.80%	1	0.27%	0	0.00%	189	50.13%	377
Alexandria City	1,417	59.56%	921	38.71%	12	0.50%	23	0.97%	6	0.25%	496	20.85%	2,379
Bristol City	784	69.14%	344	30.34%	1	0.09%	4	0.35%	1	0.09%	440	38.80%	1,134
Buena Vista City	262	62.83%	154	36.93%	0	0.00%	1	0.24%	0	0.00%	108	25.90%	417
Charlottesville City	1,041	73.99%	351	24.95%	10	0.71%	4	0.28%	1	0.07%	690	49.04%	1,407
Clifton Forge City	727	70.38%	274	26.52%	1	0.10%	31	3.00%	0	0.00%	453	43.85%	1,033
Danville City	1,888	76.25%	551	22.25%	15	0.61%	20	0.81%	2	0.08%	1,337	54.00%	2,476
Fredericksburg City	581	65.06%	299	33.48%	5	0.56%	4	0.45%	4	0.45%	282	31.58%	893
Hampton City	601	78.36%	152	19.82%	12	1.56%	2	0.26%	0	0.00%	449	58.54%	767
Harrisonburg City	594	45.45%	704	53.86%	5	0.38%	2	0.15%	2	0.15%	-110	-8.42%	1,307
Hopewell City	97	69.78%	41	29.50%	0	0.00%	1	0.72%	0	0.00%	56	40.29%	139
Lynchburg City	2,096	76.75%	609	22.30%	6	0.22%	10	0.37%	10	0.37%	1,487	54.45%	2,731
Newport News City	1,703	53.17%	1,450	45.27%	10	0.31%	33	1.03%	7	0.22%	253	7.90%	3,203
Norfolk City	5,953	70.73%	2,386	28.35%	0	0.00%	71	0.84%	7	0.08%	3,567	42.38%	8,417
Petersburg City	2,072	80.75%	485	18.90%	4	0.16%	5	0.19%	0	0.00%	1,587	61.85%	2,566
Portsmouth City	3,228	74.24%	1,061	24.40%	10	0.23%	45	1.03%	4	0.09%	2,167	49.84%	4,348
Radford City	402	60.91%	245	37.12%	3	0.45%	10	1.52%	0	0.00%	157	23.79%	660
Richmond City	14,878	75.93%	4,515	23.04%	35	0.18%	133	0.68%	34	0.17%	10,363	52.89%	19,595
Roanoke City	4,715	66.00%	2,329	32.60%	33	0.46%	54	0.76%	13	0.18%	2,386	33.40%	7,144
Staunton City	931	56.60%	705	42.86%	7	0.43%	1	0.06%	1	0.06%	226	13.74%	1,645
Suffolk City	761	70.86%	302	28.12%	10	0.93%	1	0.09%	0	0.00%	459	42.74%	1,074
Williamsburg City	166	72.81%	62	27.19%	0	0.00%	0	0.00%	0	0.00%	104	45.61%	228
Winchester City	736	56.62%	540	41.54%	18	1.38%	4	0.31%	2	0.15%	196	15.08%	1,300
Totals	141,670	61.33%	87,456	37.86%	826	0.36%	808	0.35%	240	0.10%	54,214	23.47%	231,000
