= Nansemond County, Virginia =

Former county in Virginia, United States (1646–1974)

Coordinates: 36.739323°N 76.609379°W

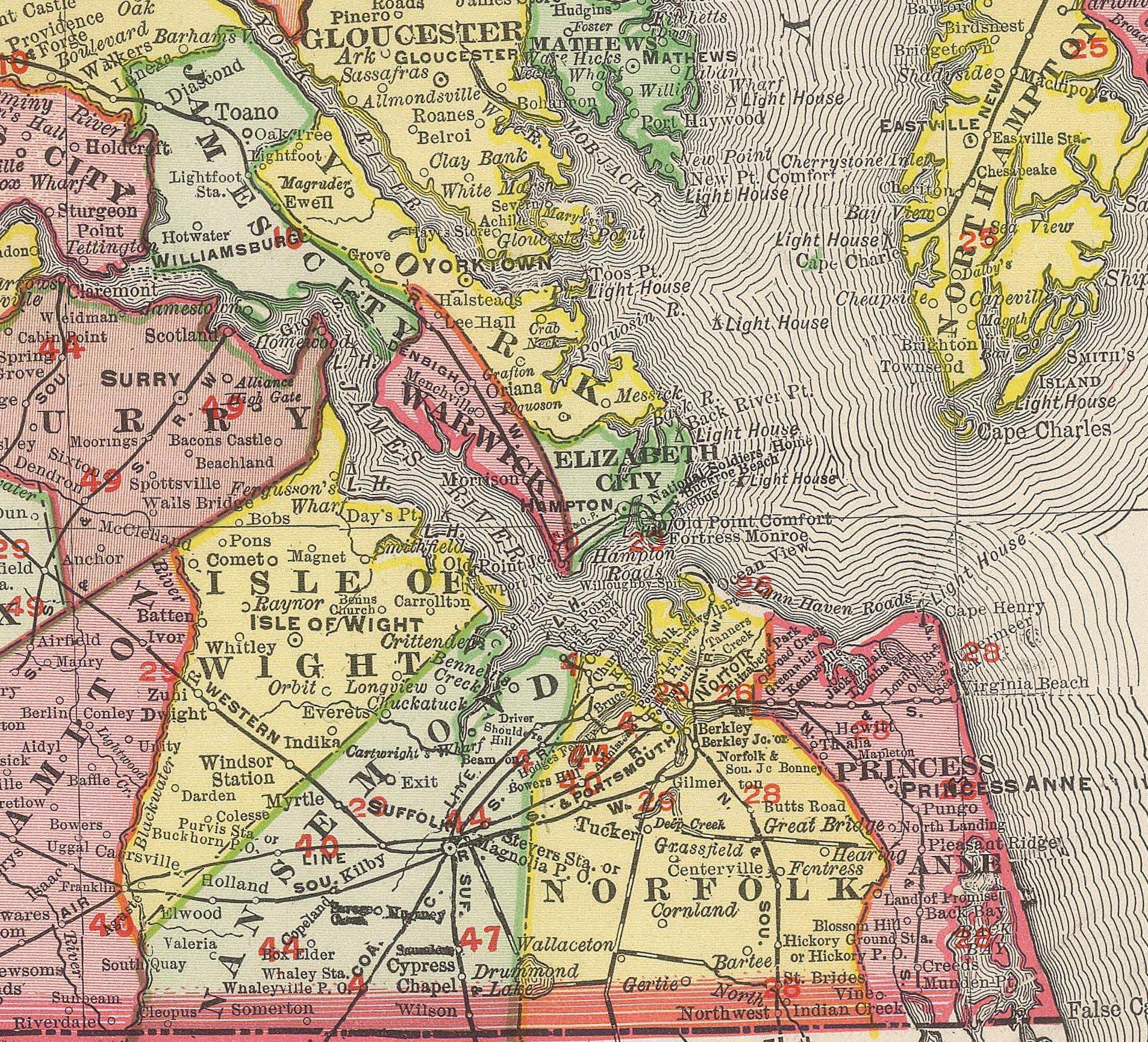
Nansemond County in 1903

Nansemond is an extinct jurisdiction that was located south of the James River in Virginia Colony and in the Commonwealth of Virginia (after statehood) in the United States, from 1646 until 1974. It was known as Nansemond County until 1972. From 1972 to 1974, a period of eighteen months, it was the independent city of Nansemond. It is now part of the independent city of Suffolk.

English colonists named it for the Nansemond, a tribe of Native Americans who had long been living along the Nansemond River, a tributary of what the English later named as the James River. They encountered the English colonists after they began arriving in 1607 at Jamestown. Although disrupted by being forced off their land and through armed confrontation with colonists, the Nansemond Indian Nation continues to be based in Virginia and was granted state (1985) and federal recognition (2018).

== History ==
=== 17th century ===
Under the Virginia Company of London, in 1619, the area which became Nansemond County was included in Elizabeth City, one of four large "boroughs", or "incorporations". In 1624, the Virginia Company lost its proprietary charter, and Virginia became a royal colony.

In 1634, the King of England directed the formation of eight shires (or counties) in the colony. One of these was Elizabeth River Shire, which included land area on both sides of Hampton Roads, as had the earlier Elizabeth Cittie. Two years later, New Norfolk County was formed in 1636 from Elizabeth River Shire. It included all the area in South Hampton Roads that is now incorporated in the five independent cities located there in modern times. The following year, in 1637, New Norfolk County was divided into Upper Norfolk County and Lower Norfolk County.

Upper Norfolk County was officially redesignated the "County of Nansimum" by the House of Burgesses in March 1646; by the October session, this was also being spelled as "Nansimund". The English named it for the indigenous Nansemond people whom they encountered in the area along the Nansemond River. Among the several Algonquian-speaking coastal peoples in the Tidewater, the Nansemond continue in the 21st century as a federally recognized tribe.

=== 18th century ===
In the 1720s, John Constant settled along the Nansemond River (in what is now Suffolk) and built a home, wharf, and warehouse. This site became known as "Constant's Warehouse."

Tobacco was the commodity crop in the Virginia colony and there was strong demand for it in England and Europe. Under the Tobacco Inspection Act of 1730, three of the 40 tobacco inspection warehouses were chartered in Nansemond County, under two inspectors, as follows:

At Waynwright's Landing, Isle of Wight; and Laurence's, in Nansemond County, under one inspection.

At the widow Constance's [sic], at Sleepy-Hole Point, in Nansemond County, under one inspection.

In 1742, the Virginia House of Burgesses chartered a new town at Constant's Wharf and renamed it as Suffolk.

In 1750, the county seat of Nansemond County was moved from Jarnigan's or Cohoon's Bridge to Suffolk. This new town was founded in 1742 at Constance's Warehouse at Sleepy Hole Point on the Nansemond River. It was named for the English hometown of Royal Governor William Gooch.

=== 19th century ===
Suffolk became an incorporated town in 1808 and an independent city in 1910. Even after Suffolk became politically independent of Nansemond County, it remained the seat of Nansemond County. Suffolk and Nansemond County also shared a court system and several other constitutional officers.

=== 20th century ===
United States presidential election results for Nansemond County, Virginia
Year	Republican		Democratic		Third party(ies)	
Year	No.	%	No.	%	No.	%
1880	958	47.01%	1,080	52.99%	0	0.00%
1884	2,020	59.89%	1,353	40.11%	0	0.00%
1888	2,087	60.16%	1,382	39.84%	0	0.00%
1892	1,477	42.68%	1,763	50.94%	221	6.39%
1896	1,060	44.52%	1,300	54.60%	21	0.88%
1900	992	39.92%	1,481	59.60%	12	0.48%
1904	186	21.43%	678	78.11%	4	0.46%
1908	272	23.82%	857	75.04%	13	1.14%
1912	53	7.95%	544	81.56%	70	10.49%
1916	70	9.55%	663	90.45%	0	0.00%
1920	243	26.05%	690	73.95%	0	0.00%
1924	99	15.18%	539	82.67%	14	2.15%
1928	649	46.83%	737	53.17%	0	0.00%
1932	196	13.37%	1,264	86.22%	6	0.41%
1936	175	10.58%	1,478	89.36%	1	0.06%
1940	129	8.39%	1,408	91.55%	1	0.07%
1944	351	20.07%	1,398	79.93%	0	0.00%
1948	413	14.89%	2,115	76.27%	245	8.84%
1952	1,168	32.87%	2,360	66.42%	25	0.70%
1956	1,753	40.21%	2,492	57.16%	115	2.64%
1960	1,346	25.29%	3,944	74.09%	33	0.62%
1964	2,590	34.93%	4,804	64.79%	21	0.28%
1968	2,101	20.94%	4,174	41.60%	3,758	37.46%
1972	5,767	57.87%	3,929	39.42%	270	2.71%

As part of a wave of political consolidations in southeastern Virginia between 1952 and 1976, the unincorporated areas of Nansemond County merged with the outlying incorporated towns of Holland and Whaleyville to form the independent city of Nansemond. Two years later Nansemond merged with Suffolk to form the present-day independent city of Suffolk. The new municipality encompassed a total of 430 square miles (1,100 km^{2}), making it the largest city in Hampton Roads and in all of Virginia in land area and the 11th largest in land area in the United States. With a life of 18 months, Nansemond was the shortest-lived independent city in Virginia history.
