= Elizabeth City County, Virginia =

Former county in Virginia, United States (1634–1952)

Coordinates: 37°4′N 76°22′W

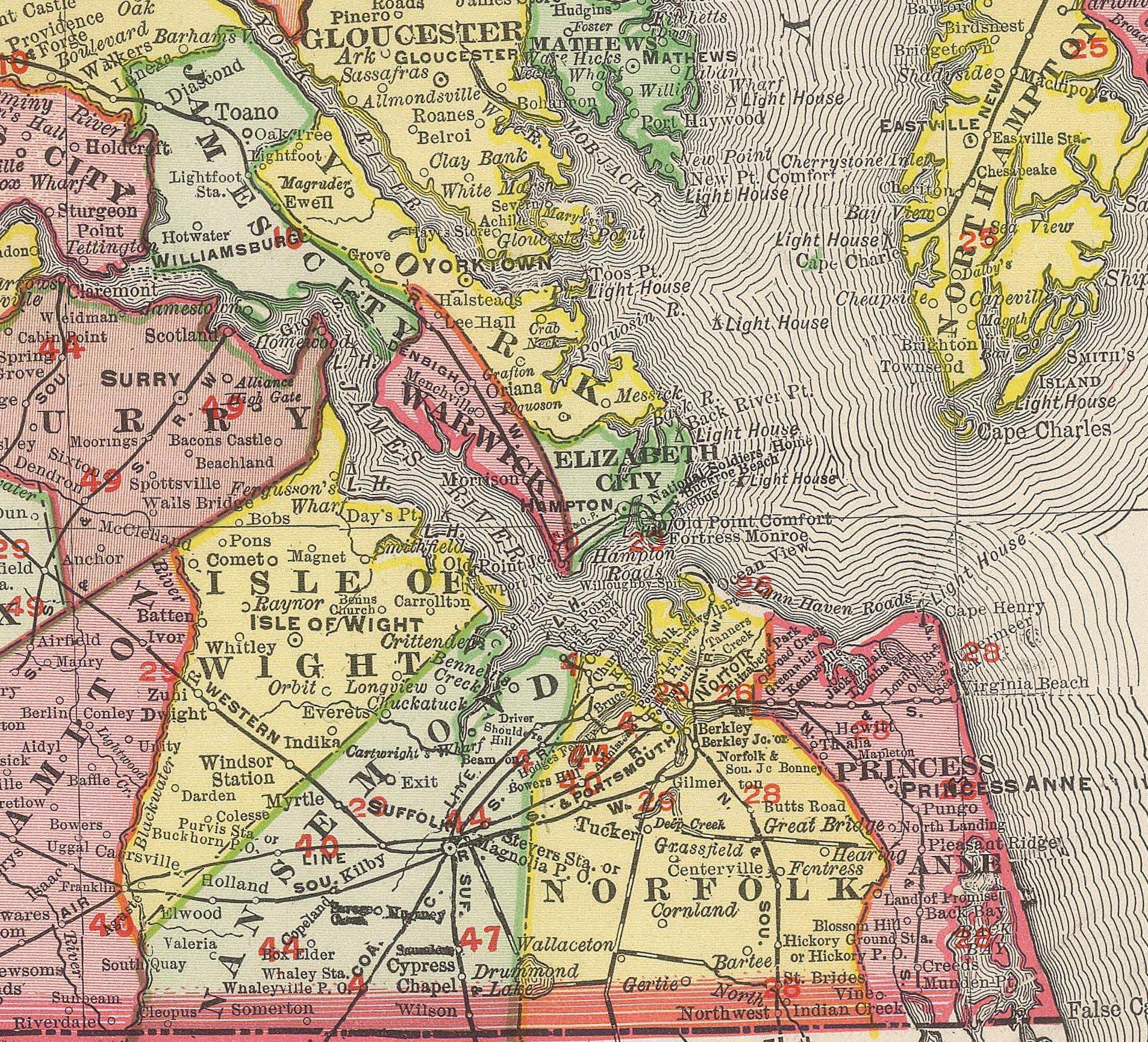
1903 Map depicting Elizabeth City County and other "lost counties" of Virginia

Elizabeth City County was a county in southeastern Virginia from 1634 until 1952 when it was merged into the city of Hampton. Originally created in 1634 as Elizabeth River Shire, it was one of eight shires created in the Virginia Colony by order of the King Charles I. In 1636, it was subdivided, and the portion north of the harbor of Hampton Roads became known as Elizabeth City Shire. It was renamed Elizabeth City County a short time later.

== History ==
Elizabeth City was originally named Kikotan (also spelled Kecoughtan and Kikowtan), presumably a word for the Native Americans living there when the English arrived in 1607. They were friendly to the English, but Sir Thomas Gates either worried about safety (including potential attack by the Spaniards and the Dutch) or coveted their corn fields after the "starving time" of the 1609–10 winter. The English seized their land while the men were out hunting, and for some reason, the natives never attacked the settlement in response.

The shire and county were named for Elizabeth of Bohemia, daughter of King James I, sister of Princes Henry and Charles.

The town of Hampton, established in 1680, became the largest city in Elizabeth City County, and was the county seat. Hampton became an independent city in 1908, though it remained the seat of Elizabeth City County and continued to share many services with the county. In 1952, Elizabeth City County and the only incorporated town in the county, Phoebus, merged with and into Hampton. This merger was the first in a series of municipal consolidations in Hampton Roads that resulted in most of the area being split into independent cities. With few exceptions, modern-day Hampton encompasses nearly all of what was Elizabeth City County.

The main exceptions are portions of Elizabeth City County that are now part of Newport News. At the time of the Peninsula Extension of the Chesapeake & Ohio Railway, part of the western portion of the county became part of Warwick County. This enabled the entire southern end of the extension to be in Warwick County. The City of Newport News was formed out of this portion of Warwick County, and in January 1927 the Elizabeth City County town of Kecoughtan was also annexed into the City of Newport News.

Since English settlers occupied the former Indian village of Kecoughtan in 1610, and the town at Jamestown was abandoned in 1699, the city of Hampton now claims to be the oldest continuously settled English-speaking city in North America.

== Historical Population ==
Historical population
Census	Pop.	Note	%±
1790	3,450		—
1800	2,778		−19.5%
1810	3,608		29.9%
1820	3,789		5.0%
1830	5,053		33.4%
1840	3,706		−26.7%
1850	4,588		23.8%
1860	5,798		26.4%
1870	8,303		43.2%
1880	10,689		28.7%
1890	16,168		51.3%
1900	19,460		20.4%
1910	15,720		−19.2%
1920	19,111		21.6%
1930	19,835		3.8%
1940	32,283		62.8%
1950	55,028		70.5%
1790-1950 Population as Elizabeth City County

=== Notable people ===
- Mary Cary Ambler (1732–1781), early American diarist, daughter of Colonel Wilson Cary, owner of the Ceelys on the James plantation in Elizabeth City County, Virginia

== Politics ==
United States presidential election results for Elizabeth City County, Virginia
Year	Republican		Democratic		Third party(ies)	
Year	No.	%	No.	%	No.	%
1880	1,182	71.20%	478	28.80%	0	0.00%
1884	1,481	73.83%	525	26.17%	0	0.00%
1888	1,316	70.00%	547	29.10%	17	0.90%
1892	1,309	57.51%	891	39.15%	76	3.34%
1896	919	60.07%	572	37.39%	39	2.55%
1900	697	40.10%	1,027	59.09%	14	0.81%
1904	211	25.79%	600	73.35%	7	0.86%
1908	251	26.73%	673	71.67%	15	1.60%
1912	43	9.37%	347	75.60%	69	15.03%
1916	132	23.57%	411	73.39%	17	3.04%
1920	439	38.24%	675	58.80%	34	2.96%
1924	312	28.26%	698	63.22%	94	8.51%
1928	1,122	58.16%	807	41.84%	0	0.00%
1932	700	35.73%	1,226	62.58%	33	1.68%
1936	597	23.50%	1,925	75.79%	18	0.71%
1940	652	21.73%	2,337	77.90%	11	0.37%
1944	1,128	30.45%	2,563	69.20%	13	0.35%
1948	1,617	33.77%	2,744	57.31%	427	8.92%

== Major communities in Elizabeth City County ==
- Buckroe Beach
- Fox Hill
- Kecoughtan
- Langley Field
- Plum Tree Point
- Phoebus
- Hampton (before it became an independent city)
- Wythe
- Aberdeen Gardens
- Pine Chapel Village

== See also ==
- Elizabeth City (Virginia Company) (1619-1634)
- Elizabeth City Shire (1634-1643)
- Hampton, Virginia (1952-)
