= Politics of Virginia =

Politics of the U.S. state of Virginia

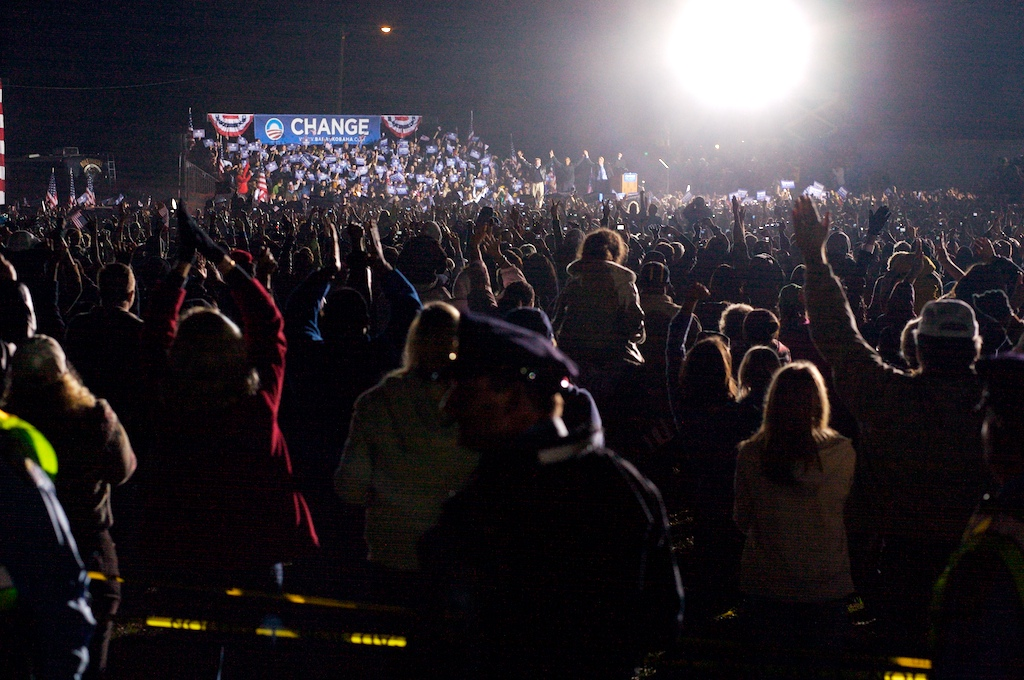
Barack Obama at a campaign rally in Manassas with former governors and current U.S. senators Tim Kaine and Mark Warner

The politics of Virginia have followed major historical events and demographic changes in the commonwealth. In the 21st century, the northern region has become more liberal in attitudes and voting, constituting a reliable voting bloc for Democrats and joining population centers in the Richmond Metropolitan and Hampton Roads areas to dominate the state. Political orientation varies by region, with the larger cities and suburban areas voting Democratic and the rural areas voting Republican. The southern, rural regions have remained Republican. Despite upset Republican victories in the 2021 elections, Virginia is usually characterized as a blue state on the federal level, having not elected a Republican president since 2004 or a Republican senator since 2002.

Eight presidents of the United States were born in Virginia, more than any other state. In fact, four of the first five presidents were born within its boundaries. George Washington, Thomas Jefferson, James Madison, James Monroe, William Henry Harrison, John Tyler, Zachary Taylor, and Woodrow Wilson were all Virginians at birth. Numerous other influential politicians, such as Patrick Henry, an American Founding Father, have also come from Virginia.

== History ==
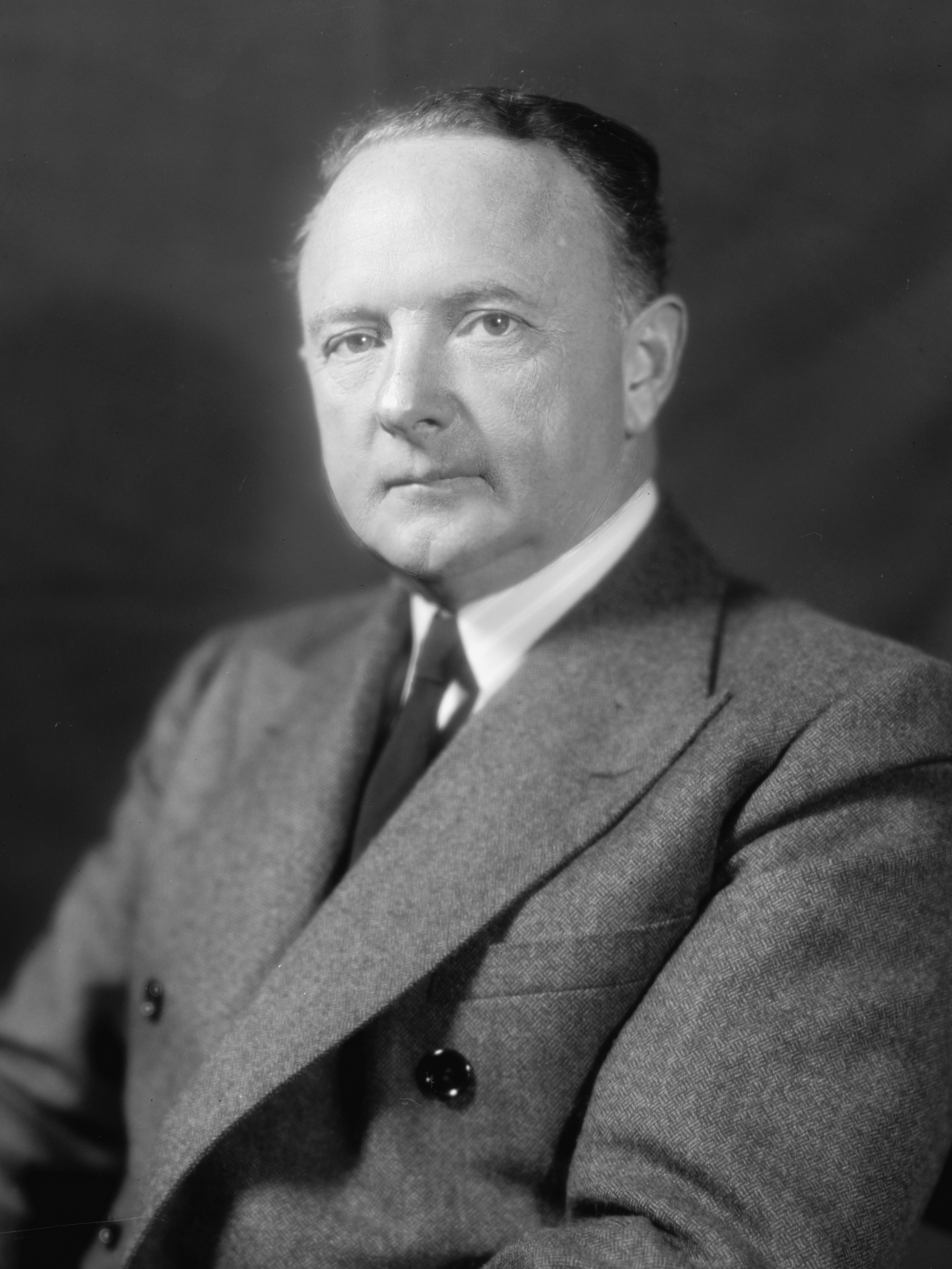
Senator Harry F. Byrd ran the important Byrd Organization until the 1960s.

After the American Civil War (1861–1865), Virginia was in political turmoil. 48 former counties now in West Virginia were gone, soon to be joined by two more. The Commonwealth of Virginia unsuccessfully appealed to the U.S. Supreme Court. In the remaining area, many citizens, mostly males of African American heritage, were newly enfranchised to vote. Many others, primarily former Confederates, were initially disenfranchised.

Elections resumed after 5 years as a U.S. Military District, and control was chaotic. In the late 1870s, a coalition of Conservative Democrats, Republicans, and African Americans was assembled and the Readjuster Party took power for about 10 years. After U.S. Senator William Mahone and the Readjuster Party lost control of Virginia politics around 1883, white Democrats regained the state legislature. They proceeded to use statute and a new constitution in 1901, with provisions such as a poll tax, residency requirements, and literacy test to disfranchise most African Americans and many poor whites. Their disfranchisement lasted until after the passage of civil rights legislation in the mid-1960s.

White Democrats created a one-party state, with a nearly unchallenged majority of state and most federal offices through the middle of the 20th century. The Byrd Organization headed by Harry F. Byrd Sr. largely controlled statewide politics. Through their leadership and activism in the Civil Rights Movement, African Americans gained national support for passage of the Civil Rights Act of 1964 and the Voting Rights Act of 1965, which provided Federal oversight and enforcement to maintain all citizens' ability to vote. Under Section 5 of the Voting Rights Act, decisions affecting elections are subject to preclearance by the U.S. Department of Justice before they can take effect.

President Lyndon Johnson's and national Democrats' support for civil rights turned many conservative whites in Virginia against the Democrats. However, many Virginians had been willing to support Republicans, at least at the national level, since the 1930s due to Franklin Roosevelt's strong support for organized labor. While the Republican Party in most of the South tended to attract right-wing conservatives like Jesse Helms and Strom Thurmond, Virginia's GOP has tended to be more moderate by regional standards. The state elected moderate Republican A. Linwood Holton Jr. in 1970; Holton became the first Republican governor in the 20th century, effectively ending the influence of the Byrd Organization. The current Virginia State Constitution was created in 1971 to replace the discriminatory one created in 1901. Holton was succeeded by two other Republican governors: the more conservative Mills Godwin (a former Democrat) and John N. Dalton. Five-term U.S. Senator John Warner and Congressman Tom Davis also exemplified the more "moderate-conservative" tendencies of Virginia Republicans. From 1982 through 1994, Democrats served as governor, with Chuck Robb elected in 1981 and Gerald L. Baliles in 1985. In 1989, Virginia elected Democrat Douglas Wilder governor, who served from 1990 to 1994, as Virginia's first African-American governor. In 2001, Virginia elected Democrats Mark Warner as governor and Tim Kaine as lieutenant governor, and Kaine was elected to succeed Warner as governor in 2005. In 2009, however, a Republican again returned to the governor's mansion as Bob McDonnell defeated Democrat Creigh Deeds, garnering 58.61% of the popular vote to Deeds' 41.25%. Republicans also managed to sweep all statewide races in 2009, the first time they accomplished this feat since 1997.

Virginia voted for Republicans in nearly every presidential election from 1952 to 2004 except for the Democratic landslide in President Johnson's election in 1964. This former streak started when Richard Nixon began the Southern Strategy, and is the longest among the former Confederate States. Virginia was the only such state to vote for Gerald Ford over Jimmy Carter in 1976. Since 2008, Virginia has voted for Democrats in presidential elections, including Barack Obama; in 2016 and 2024, Virginia was the only former Confederate state to vote for Hillary Clinton and Kamala Harris over Donald Trump.

Regional differences play a large part in Virginia politics. Rural southern and western areas moved to support the Republican Party in response to its "southern strategy", while urban and growing suburban areas, including much of Northern Virginia and recently, Richmond form the Democratic Party base. Democratic support also persists in union-influenced Roanoke in Southwest Virginia, college towns such as Charlottesville and Blacksburg, and the southeastern Black Belt Region. Enfranchisement and immigration of other groups, especially Hispanics, have placed growing importance on minority voting, while voters that identify as "white working-class" declined by three percent between 2008 and 2012. State election seasons traditionally start with the annual Shad Planking event in Wakefield.

=== Recent events ===
Treemap of the popular vote by county, 2016 presidential election.

In 2007, the Virginia General Assembly proposed Civil Remedial Fees or "abusive driver fees" were fines that could exceed $1,000 for certain moving violations. The proposal had gained bi-partisan support as a way to generate revenue while not increasing taxes. An online petition to oppose the bill quickly gathered nearly 100,000 signatures. These were repealed one year later in 2008 and fees were refunded.

On February 28, 2023, President Joe Biden visited the city of Virginia Beach in hopes of rallying support regarding affordable healthcare.

=== Criticism ===
Dozens of delegates run unopposed each election cycle, which led 2001 Libertarian gubernatorial candidate and former national Libertarian Party chair Bill Redpath to conclude that "Virginia has a democracy that is uncompetitive and boring." Redpath proposed eliminating the 40 single-member districts and have all state senators run statewide, with the top 40 candidates with the highest vote count getting elected. However, this proposal would give more power to the highly populated urban areas of the state, and thus has little chance of statewide support.

== Congressional representation ==
Virginia's congressional districts in effect since the 2022 elections

=== Senate ===
- Tim Kaine (D) won the seat in 2012.
- Mark Warner (D) won the seat in 2008.

=== House ===
- 1st district: Rob Wittman (R)
- 2nd district: Jen Kiggans (R)
- 3rd district: Bobby Scott (D)
- 4th district: Jennifer McClellan (D)
- 5th district: John McGuire (R)
- 6th district: Ben Cline (R)
- 7th district: Eugene Vindman (D)
- 8th district: Don Beyer (D)
- 9th district: Morgan Griffith (R)
- 10th district: Suhas Subramanyam (D)
- 11th district: James Walkinshaw (D)

Virginia is part of the United States District Court for the Western District of Virginia and the United States District Court for the Eastern District of Virginia in the federal judiciary. The district's cases are appealed to the Richmond-based United States Court of Appeals for the Fourth Circuit.

== Elections ==
=== State elections ===
Political party strength in Virginia has likewise been in flux. In the 2007 state elections, Democrats regained control of the State Senate, and narrowed the Republican majority in the House of Delegates to eight seats. Yet elections in 2009 resulted in the election of Republican Bob McDonnell as Governor by a seventeen-point margin, the election of a Republican Lieutenant Governor and Attorney General, as well as Republican gains of six seats in the House of Delegates. In 2011, the Republican caucus took over two-thirds (68–32) of the seats in the House of Delegates, and a majority of the Senate based on the Lieutenant Governor Bill Bolling as the tie-breaker.

Unity control only lasted two years, and in the 2013 elections, Democrat Terry McAuliffe was elected Governor by two percentage points, and Democrat Ralph Northam was elected Lieutenant Governor by double digits. Republicans, however, maintained their super-majority (68–32) in the House of Delegates.

The 2017 statewide elections resulted in Democrats holding the three highest offices, with outgoing lieutenant governor Ralph Northam winning the governorship, Justin Fairfax becoming the second African-American elected lieutenant governor, and Mark Herring continuing as attorney general. Republicans meanwhile continued a statewide electoral drought that dates to McDonnell's 2009 gubernatorial victory. In concurrent House of Delegates elections, Democrats flipped fifteen of the Republicans' previous sixteen-seat majority. Control of the House came down to the tied election in the 94th district, which was won by Republicans through drawing of lots, giving them a 51–49 majority.

In 2019, Democrats took full control of the state's legislature, flipping at least two state senate seats and five state house seats from Republican to Democratic candidates.

In 2021, Republicans retook control of the House of Delegates, flipping at least seven seats from Democratic to Republican candidates. Additionally, Glenn Youngkin, a Republican, defeated Terry McAuliffe in the governor's race, Virginia elected its first black female lieutenant governor Winsome Sears, a Republican, and elected Virginia's first Latino attorney general, Jason Miyares, a Republican.

In the 2023 election, Democrats regained control of the House of Delegates — flipping three seats — and held onto the Senate.

=== Federal elections ===
United States presidential election results for Virginia
Year	Republican / Whig		Democratic		Third party(ies)	
Year	No.	%	No.	%	No.	%
1824	3,419	22.24%	2,975	19.35%	8,977	58.40%
1828	12,070	31.01%	26,854	68.99%	0	0.00%
1832	11,436	25.03%	34,243	74.96%	3	0.01%
1836	23,384	43.35%	30,556	56.64%	5	0.01%
1840	42,637	49.35%	43,757	50.65%	0	0.00%
1844	44,860	46.95%	50,679	53.05%	0	0.00%
1848	45,265	49.20%	46,739	50.80%	0	0.00%
1852	58,732	44.29%	73,872	55.71%	0	0.00%
1856	0	0.00%	90,083	59.96%	60,150	40.04%
1860	1,887	1.13%	16,198	9.71%	148,806	89.16%
1872	93,463	50.47%	91,647	49.49%	85	0.05%
1876	95,518	40.42%	140,770	59.58%	0	0.00%
1880	83,533	39.47%	128,083	60.53%	0	0.00%
1884	139,356	48.90%	145,491	51.05%	130	0.05%
1888	150,399	49.46%	152,004	49.99%	1,684	0.55%
1892	113,098	38.70%	164,136	56.17%	15,004	5.13%
1896	135,379	45.94%	154,708	52.50%	4,587	1.56%
1900	115,769	43.82%	146,079	55.29%	2,360	0.89%
1904	48,180	36.95%	80,649	61.84%	1,581	1.21%
1908	52,572	38.36%	82,946	60.52%	1,547	1.13%
1912	23,288	17.00%	90,332	65.95%	23,356	17.05%
1916	49,356	32.05%	102,824	66.77%	1,812	1.18%
1920	87,456	37.86%	141,670	61.33%	1,873	0.81%
1924	73,312	32.79%	139,716	62.48%	10,574	4.73%
1928	164,609	53.91%	140,146	45.90%	603	0.20%
1932	89,637	30.09%	203,979	68.46%	4,326	1.45%
1936	98,336	29.39%	234,980	70.23%	1,274	0.38%
1940	109,363	31.55%	235,961	68.08%	1,283	0.37%
1944	145,243	37.39%	242,276	62.36%	966	0.25%
1948	172,070	41.04%	200,786	47.89%	46,400	11.07%
1952	349,037	56.32%	268,677	43.36%	1,975	0.32%
1956	386,459	55.37%	267,760	38.36%	43,759	6.27%
1960	404,521	52.44%	362,327	46.97%	4,601	0.60%
1964	481,334	46.18%	558,038	53.54%	2,895	0.28%
1968	590,319	43.36%	442,387	32.49%	328,785	24.15%
1972	988,493	67.84%	438,887	30.12%	29,639	2.03%
1976	836,554	49.29%	813,896	47.96%	46,644	2.75%
1980	989,609	53.03%	752,174	40.31%	124,249	6.66%
1984	1,337,078	62.29%	796,250	37.09%	13,307	0.62%
1988	1,309,162	59.74%	859,799	39.23%	22,648	1.03%
1992	1,150,517	44.97%	1,038,650	40.59%	369,498	14.44%
1996	1,138,350	47.10%	1,091,060	45.15%	187,232	7.75%
2000	1,437,490	52.47%	1,217,290	44.44%	84,667	3.09%
2004	1,716,959	53.68%	1,454,742	45.48%	26,666	0.83%
2008	1,725,005	46.33%	1,959,532	52.63%	38,723	1.04%
2012	1,822,522	47.28%	1,971,820	51.16%	60,147	1.56%
2016	1,769,443	44.43%	1,981,473	49.75%	231,836	5.82%
2020	1,962,430	44.00%	2,413,568	54.11%	84,526	1.89%
2024	2,075,085	46.05%	2,335,395	51.83%	95,461	2.12%

In federal elections since 2006, both parties have seen successes. Republican Senator George Allen lost close races in 2006, to Democratic newcomer Jim Webb, and again in 2012, to Webb's replacement, former Governor Tim Kaine. In 2008, Democrats won both United States Senate seats; former Democratic Governor Mark Warner was elected to replace retiring Republican John Warner (no relation). The state went Republican in 11 out of 12 presidential elections from 1948 to 2004, including 10 in a row from 1968 to 2004. However, Democrat Barack Obama carried Virginia's 13 electoral votes in both the 2008 and 2012 presidential elections.

In the 2010 elections, Republicans won three United States House of Representatives seats from the Democrats. Of the state's eleven seats in the House of Representatives, Democrats and Republicans both hold five, with one vacant seat. The state is considered moderately blue-leaning, a trend that moves parallel with the growth of the Washington D.C. and Richmond suburbs but has been recognized as a swing state by some in light of the 2021 GOP wave. A Federal District Court redrew the malapportioned 3rd District as violating the Voting Rights Act for the 2016 election. That allowed Virginians to choose an additional Representative from the 4th District, and added one to the Democratic total. In the 2018 elections, Democrats flipped 3 seats and obtained a 7–4 majority for the first time since 2008. In the 2022 elections, Democrats lost one of those seats in the 2nd district and were reduced to 6–5.

=== Statewide referendums ===
In 2006, a statewide referendum on the Marshall-Newman Amendment added a provision to the Bill of Rights of the Virginia Constitution banning gay marriage; it passed with 57% of the vote. The amendment was later ruled unconstitutional in 2014, in the case of Bostic v. Schaefer.

== See also ==
- Government of Virginia
- Elections in Virginia
- List of politics by U.S. state
- Republican Party of Virginia
- Democratic Party of Virginia
- Libertarian Party of Virginia
- Green Party of Virginia
- Independent Greens of Virginia
- Law of Virginia
- Shad Planking
