= Elections in Virginia =

Voting in the Commonwealth

Elections in Virginia are authorized under Article I of the Virginia State Constitution, sections 5–6, and Article V which establishes elections for the state-level officers, cabinet, and legislature. Article VII section 4 establishes the election of county-level officers. Elections are regulated under state statute 24.2-102. The Virginia State Board of Elections oversees the execution of elections under state law. In a 2020 study, Virginia was ranked as the 12th easiest state for citizens to vote in.

Voters do not register by party in Virginia, and Virginia conducts open primaries where any voter may cast a ballot for either party. Traditionally, political parties could choose which nomination method to use for each election, with the option to either participate in the state-run primary or conduct a party-run convention. A law which passed in 2021 and took effect in 2024 requires a party's method of nomination to make certain accommodations for absentee voters, and had the practical effect of outlawing party-run conventions.

In general elections, the party affiliations of local candidates do not appear on the ballot. Candidates for federal, statewide, and General Assembly offices appear on the ballot with party designations. Besides the Democratic Party of Virginia and the Republican Party of Virginia, other parties include the Libertarian Party of Virginia, Constitution Party of Virginia, Green Party of Virginia, and the Independent Greens of Virginia. Third parties and independents have benefited from electoral reform in Virginia, especially streamlined ballot access, and have made their presence known by appearing on statewide ballots and even winning seats to soil and water conservation district boards.

In 2009, Governor Tim Kaine proposed to authorize no-excuse early voting in Virginia elections, noting that 26 other states allow it. On January 26, 2009, the bill passed the Democratic-controlled Senate. However, the Republican-controlled House of delegates killed the proposal.

Governor Kaine worked with a coalition of civic groups to work to restore the voting rights of felons who were convicted of non-violent crimes in the past. Kaine's staff reviewed each individual application from felons who had been out of prison for at least five years without an additional conviction. An estimated 366,000 Virginia citizens are disenfranchised due to a prior felony conviction.

== Administration ==
The Commonwealth of Virginia holds its state general elections on the first Tuesday after the first Monday in November (better known as Election Day) in every odd-numbered year. As a result of this, gubernatorial elections in Virginia systematically follow the quadrennial United States presidential election by one year.

During general elections in Virginia, elections are held for the statewide executive positions of governor, lieutenant governor, and attorney general. Elections are also held for legislative positions in the Senate of Virginia and the Virginia House of Delegates and the county-level offices of Commonwealth's attorney, sheriff, clerk of court, Treasurer, and Commissioner of the Revenue. Officials elected to the House of Delegates serve a term of two years, and clerks of court are elected to eight-year terms. All other officials are elected for a term of four years.

Virginia's governor, lieutenant governor, and attorney general are elected at large every four years. State senators and members of the House of Delegates are elected in single-member districts. County-level officials are elected by county.

Virginia has 100 seats in its House of Delegates, and 40 seats in its Senate.

=== Balance of power ===
Virginia Government balance of power

| Office | Party in Power | Assumed Control | Next Election |
|---|---|---|---|
| Governor | Democratic (Spanberger) | January 17, 2026 (Spanberger) | November 6, 2029 |
| Lieutenant governor | Democratic (Hashmi) | January 17, 2026 (Hashmi) | November 6, 2029 |
| Attorney general | Democratic (Jones) | January 17, 2026 (Jones) | November 6, 2029 |
| Virginia Senate | Democratic (21/40 seats) | January 2020 (21/40 seats) | November 2, 2027 |
| Virginia House of Delegates | Democratic (64/100 seats) | January 2026 (64/100 seats) | November 2, 2027 |

== History ==
Gubernatorial election results
| Year | Democratic | Republican |
|---|---|---|
| 1953 | 54.8% 226,998 | 44.3% 183,328 |
| 1957 | 63.2% 326,921 | 36.4% 188,628 |
| 1961 | 63.9% 251,861 | 36.2% 142,567 |
| 1965 | 47.9% 296,526 | 37.7% 212,207 |
| 1969 | 45.4% 415,695 | 52.5% 480,869 |
| 1973 | 49.3% 510,103 | 50.7% 525,075 |
| 1977 | 43.3% 541,319 | 55.9% 699,302 |
| 1981 | 53.6% 760,357 | 46.4% 659,398 |
| 1985 | 55.2% 741,438 | 44.8% 601,652 |
| 1989 | 50.1% 897,139 | 49.8% 890,285 |
| 1993 | 40.9% 733,527 | 58.3% 1,045,319 |
| 1997 | 42.6% 738,971 | 55.8% 969,062 |
| 2001 | 52.2% 984,177 | 47.0% 887,234 |
| 2005 | 51.7% 1,025,942 | 46.0% 912,327 |
| 2009 | 41.3% 818,950 | 58.6% 1,163,651 |
| 2013 | 47.8% 1,069,789 | 45.2% 1,013,354 |
| 2017 | 53.9% 1,409,175 | 45.0% 1,175,731 |
| 2021 | 48.6% 1,600,116 | 50.6% 1,663,596 |
| 2025 | 57.6% 1,976,857 | 42.2% 1,449,586 |

United States presidential election results for Virginia
| Year | Republican / Whig | | Democratic | | Third party(ies) | |
| Year | No. | % | No. | % | No. | % |
|---|---|---|---|---|---|---|
| 1836 | 23,384 | 43.35% | 30,556 | 56.64% | 5 | 0.01% |
| 1840 | 42,637 | 49.35% | 43,757 | 50.65% | 0 | 0.00% |
| 1844 | 44,860 | 46.95% | 50,679 | 53.05% | 0 | 0.00% |
| 1848 | 45,265 | 49.20% | 46,739 | 50.80% | 0 | 0.00% |
| 1852 | 58,732 | 44.29% | 73,872 | 55.71% | 0 | 0.00% |
| 1856 | 0 | 0.00% | 90,083 | 59.96% | 60,150 | 40.04% |
| 1860 | 1,887 | 1.13% | 16,198 | 9.71% | 148,806 | 89.16% |
| 1872 | 93,463 | 50.47% | 91,647 | 49.49% | 85 | 0.05% |
| 1876 | 95,518 | 40.42% | 140,770 | 59.58% | 0 | 0.00% |
| 1880 | 83,533 | 39.47% | 128,083 | 60.53% | 0 | 0.00% |
| 1884 | 139,356 | 48.90% | 145,491 | 51.05% | 130 | 0.05% |
| 1888 | 150,399 | 49.46% | 152,004 | 49.99% | 1,684 | 0.55% |
| 1892 | 113,098 | 38.70% | 164,136 | 56.17% | 15,004 | 5.13% |
| 1896 | 135,379 | 45.94% | 154,708 | 52.50% | 4,587 | 1.56% |
| 1900 | 115,769 | 43.82% | 146,079 | 55.29% | 2,360 | 0.89% |
| 1904 | 48,180 | 36.95% | 80,649 | 61.84% | 1,581 | 1.21% |
| 1908 | 52,572 | 38.36% | 82,946 | 60.52% | 1,547 | 1.13% |
| 1912 | 23,288 | 17.00% | 90,332 | 65.95% | 23,356 | 17.05% |
| 1916 | 49,356 | 32.05% | 102,824 | 66.77% | 1,812 | 1.18% |
| 1920 | 87,456 | 37.86% | 141,670 | 61.33% | 1,873 | 0.81% |
| 1924 | 73,312 | 32.79% | 139,716 | 62.48% | 10,574 | 4.73% |
| 1928 | 164,609 | 53.91% | 140,146 | 45.90% | 603 | 0.20% |
| 1932 | 89,637 | 30.09% | 203,979 | 68.46% | 4,326 | 1.45% |
| 1936 | 98,336 | 29.39% | 234,980 | 70.23% | 1,274 | 0.38% |
| 1940 | 109,363 | 31.55% | 235,961 | 68.08% | 1,283 | 0.37% |
| 1944 | 145,243 | 37.39% | 242,276 | 62.36% | 966 | 0.25% |
| 1948 | 172,070 | 41.04% | 200,786 | 47.89% | 46,400 | 11.07% |
| 1952 | 349,037 | 56.32% | 268,677 | 43.36% | 1,975 | 0.32% |
| 1956 | 386,459 | 55.37% | 267,760 | 38.36% | 43,759 | 6.27% |
| 1960 | 404,521 | 52.44% | 362,327 | 46.97% | 4,601 | 0.60% |
| 1964 | 481,334 | 46.18% | 558,038 | 53.54% | 2,895 | 0.28% |
| 1968 | 590,319 | 43.36% | 442,387 | 32.49% | 328,785 | 24.15% |
| 1972 | 988,493 | 67.84% | 438,887 | 30.12% | 29,639 | 2.03% |
| 1976 | 836,554 | 49.29% | 813,896 | 47.96% | 46,644 | 2.75% |
| 1980 | 989,609 | 53.03% | 752,174 | 40.31% | 124,249 | 6.66% |
| 1984 | 1,337,078 | 62.29% | 796,250 | 37.09% | 13,307 | 0.62% |
| 1988 | 1,309,162 | 59.74% | 859,799 | 39.23% | 22,648 | 1.03% |
| 1992 | 1,150,517 | 44.97% | 1,038,650 | 40.59% | 369,498 | 14.44% |
| 1996 | 1,138,350 | 47.10% | 1,091,060 | 45.15% | 187,232 | 7.75% |
| 2000 | 1,437,490 | 52.47% | 1,217,290 | 44.44% | 84,667 | 3.09% |
| 2004 | 1,716,959 | 53.68% | 1,454,742 | 45.48% | 26,666 | 0.83% |
| 2008 | 1,725,005 | 46.33% | 1,959,532 | 52.63% | 38,723 | 1.04% |
| 2012 | 1,822,522 | 47.28% | 1,971,820 | 51.16% | 60,147 | 1.56% |
| 2016 | 1,769,443 | 44.41% | 1,981,473 | 49.73% | 233,715 | 5.87% |
| 2020 | 1,962,430 | 44.00% | 2,413,568 | 54.11% | 84,526 | 1.89% |
| 2024 | 2,075,085 | 46.05% | 2,335,395 | 51.83% | 95,461 | 2.12% |

After the American Civil War (1861–1865), Virginia was in political turmoil. 48 former counties now in West Virginia were gone, soon to be joined by two more. The Commonwealth of Virginia unsuccessfully appealed to the U.S. Supreme Court. In the remaining area, many citizens, mostly males of African American heritage, were newly enfranchised to vote. Many others, primarily former Confederates, were initially disenfranchised.

Elections resumed after 5 years as a U.S. Military District, and control was chaotic. In the late 1870s, a coalition of Conservative Democrats, Republicans, and African Americans was assembled and the Readjuster Party took power for about 10 years. After U.S. Senator William Mahone and the Readjuster Party lost control of Virginia politics around 1883, white Democrats regained the state legislature. They proceeded to use statute and a new constitution in 1901, with provisions such as a poll tax, residency requirements, and literacy test to disfranchise most African Americans and many poor whites. Their disfranchisement lasted until after the passage of civil rights legislation in the mid-1960s.

White Democrats created a one-party state, with a nearly unchallenged majority of state and most federal offices through the middle of the 20th century. The Byrd Organization headed by Harry F. Byrd Sr. largely controlled statewide politics. Through their leadership and activism in the Civil Rights Movement, African Americans gained national support for passage of the Civil Rights Act of 1964 and the Voting Rights Act of 1965, which provided Federal oversight and enforcement to maintain all citizens' ability to vote. Under Section 5 of the Voting Rights Act, decisions affecting elections are subject to preclearance by the U.S. Department of Justice before they can take effect.

President Lyndon Johnson's and national Democrats' support for civil rights turned many conservative whites in Virginia against the Democrats. However, many Virginians had been willing to support Republicans, at least at the national level, since the 1930s due to Franklin Roosevelt's strong support for organized labor. While the Republican Party in most of the South tended to attract right-wing conservatives like Jesse Helms and Strom Thurmond, Virginia's GOP has tended to be more moderate by regional standards. The state elected moderate Republican A. Linwood Holton Jr. in 1970; Holton became the first Republican governor in the 20th century, effectively ending the influence of the Byrd Organization. The current Virginia State Constitution was created in 1971 to replace the discriminatory one created in 1901. Holton was succeeded by two other Republican governors: the more conservative Mills Godwin (a former Democrat) and John N. Dalton. Five-term U.S. Senator John Warner and Congressman Tom Davis also exemplified the more "moderate-conservative" tendencies of Virginia Republicans. From 1982 through 1994, Democrats served as governor, with Chuck Robb elected in 1981 and Gerald L. Baliles in 1985. In 1989, Virginia elected Democrat Douglas Wilder governor, who served from 1990 to 1994, as Virginia's first African-American governor. In 2001, Virginia elected Democrats Mark Warner as governor and Tim Kaine as lieutenant governor, and Kaine was elected to succeed Warner as governor in 2005. In 2009, however, a Republican again returned to the governor's mansion as Bob McDonnell defeated Democrat Creigh Deeds, garnering 58.61% of the popular vote to Deeds' 41.25%. Republicans also managed to sweep all statewide races in 2009, the first time they accomplished this feat since 1997.

Virginia voted for Republicans in nearly every presidential election from 1952 to 2004 except for the Democratic landslide in President Johnson's election in 1964. This former streak started when Richard Nixon began the Southern Strategy, and is the longest among the former Confederate States. Virginia was the only such state to vote for Gerald Ford over Jimmy Carter in 1976. Since 2008, Virginia has voted for Democrats in presidential elections, including Barack Obama; in 2016, Virginia was the only former Confederate state to vote for Hillary Clinton over Donald Trump.

=== Recent events ===
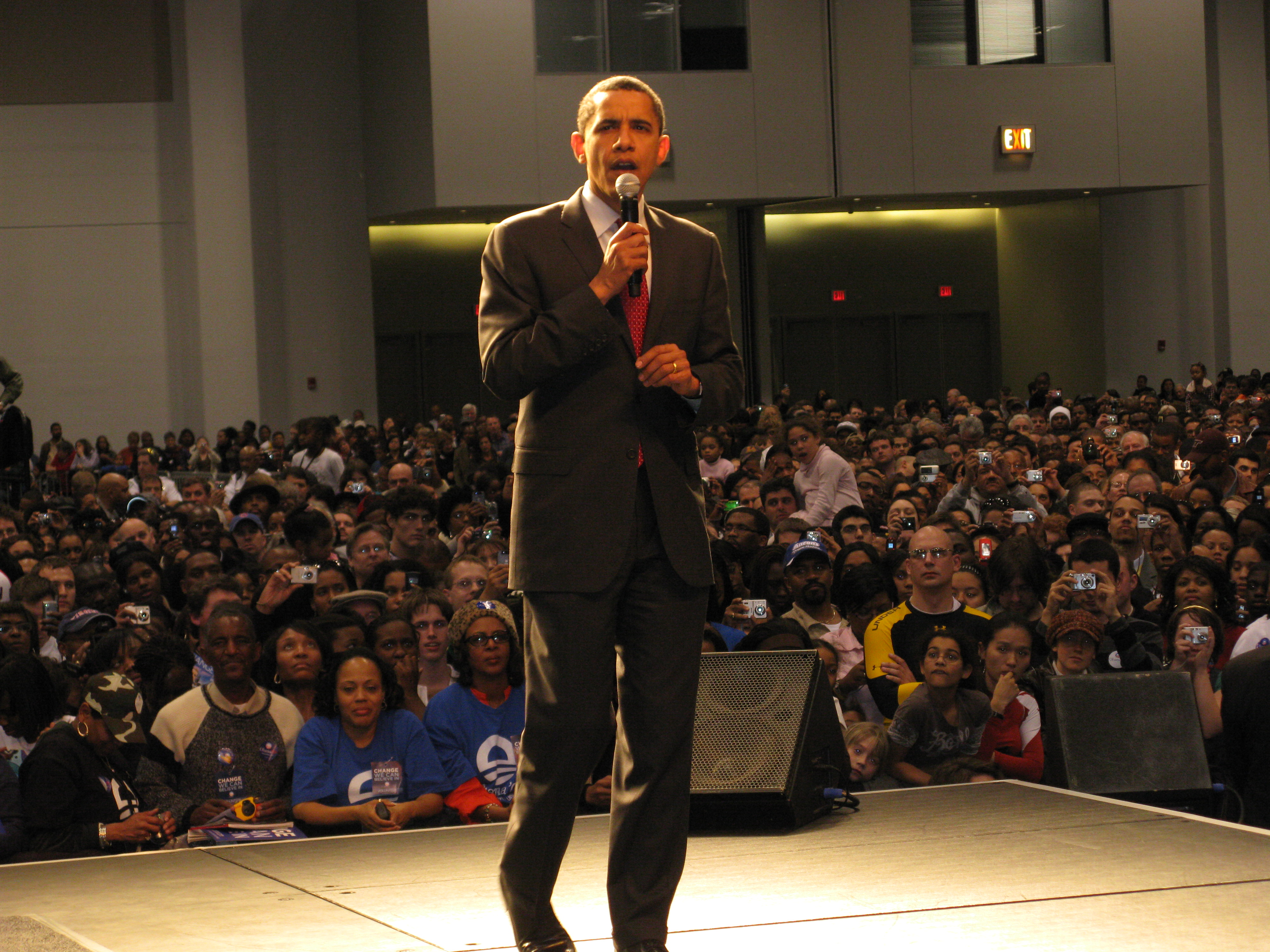
Barack Obama campaigns in Virginia Beach. In his 2008 win, Virginia voted for a Democrat for the first time in ten Presidential elections.

In 1989, Doug Wilder was the first African-American elected governor of a U.S. state. Despite Virginia's support of Republican presidential candidates and reputation as a conservative state, voters elected Democratic candidates for three consecutive gubernatorial races in the 1980s. In addition, Democratic representatives maintained large majorities in both houses of the Virginia General Assembly. Many Democratic state representatives from rural and suburban districts had conservative stances on various issues.

In the 1990s Virginia experienced some political realignment, electing conservative Republicans George Allen and Jim Gilmore to the governorship from 1994 until 2002. Jim Gilmore's "no car tax" pledge was emblazoned on bumper stickers and yard signs across the state. Republicans captured both houses of the General Assembly and built majorities. Republican representatives replaced Conservative and moderate Democrats from rural and suburban areas. Within the Republican party, more conservative officeholders supplanted the remnants of the less conservative "mountain-valley" faction of Holton, so named because many members were from the Shenandoah Valley and Southwest Virginia.

After eight years of Republican governorships, in 2001, Mark Warner, a progressive businessman, won the governorship and confronted budget difficulties related to the recession by cutting money from all state departments. Virginia's executive branch is limited by the fact that governors are barred from serving consecutive terms, a constitutional provision that distinguishes Virginia from any other state. After decades of Democratic rule in the Virginia General Assembly, Republicans took control around the turn of the 21st century and promptly redistricted to protect their incumbents. In 2005 Tim Kaine, Warner's lieutenant governor, won the governor's office over Jerry Kilgore and "independent Republican" state senator Russ Potts.

In 2006, Jim Webb narrowly defeated George Allen in the wake of the Macaca slur incident. The electorate's reaction to Allen's gaffe demonstrated the changing sensibilities of the region's citizens; prior to that, Allen had a double-digit lead in the polls. In 2007, Virginia driver fees legislation created a political uproar when residents realized that they faced $3,000 fines for certain moving violations. An online petition quickly gathered hundreds of thousands of signatures, spurring legislators up for re-election that November to reconsider their positions. This was the first time that the Internet played such a dramatic role in influencing Virginia politics. In 2007, the Democrats regained control of the State Senate, and narrowed the Republican majority in the House of delegates to 7 or 8 votes.

Virginia voted for Democrat Barack Obama in 2008, after backing Republican candidates for the previous ten presidential elections. Virginia may be considered a "swing state" for future presidential elections. Its margin for Obama of 6.3% made it a close indicator of the national vote (a 7.2% Obama margin).

In the November 2009 general election Republican Bob McDonnell won the governorship by an 18-point margin, while Republican lieutenant governor and Attorney General candidates Bill Bolling and Ken Cuccinelli also won their respective races. They led statewide gains by the Republican party winning five additional seats in the House of Delegates. In the November 2010 federal elections, Republicans picked up three U.S. House seats previously held by Democrats, and proceeded to hold eight of Virginia's eleven seats, compared to three for Democrats. In the November 2018 federal elections, Democrats picked up three U.S. House seats previously held by Republicans, and proceeded to hold seven of Virginia's eleven seats, compared to four for Republicans. From 1977 until 2013, Virginia had elected a governor of the opposite political party compared to the President of the United States of the time.

In 2017, Virginia returned to electing a governor of the opposite political party compared to the current President by electing Democrat Ralph Northam. This happened again in each of Virginia's next two gubernatorial elections: when Republican Glenn Youngkin was elected in 2021, and when Democrat Abigail Spanberger was elected in 2025.

== List of elections and turnout ==
The following table lists all state and federal regular elections from 1976, along with the voter turnout.

| Year | Registered | Percentage change from previous year | Total voting | Turnout (% voting of total registered) | Voting absentee (included in total voting) | Elections |
|---|---|---|---|---|---|---|
| 2021 | | | | | | State: Governor, Lieutenant Governor, Attorney General, House |
| 2020 | 5,975,696 | 6.18% | 4,486,821 | 75.08% | 2,687,304 | Federal: President, Senator (II), House |
| 2019 | 5,628,035 | -1.0% | 2,383,646 | 42.4% | 144,360 | State: Senate, House |
| 2018 | 5,666,962 | 3.31% | 3,374,382 | 59.5% | 287,763 | Federal: Senator (I), House |
| 2017 | 5,489,530 | -0.73% | 2,612,309 | 47.6% | 182,256 | State: Governor, Lieutenant Governor, Attorney General, House |
| 2016 | 5,529,742 | 6.41% | 3,984,631 | 72.05% | 496,452 | Federal: President, House |
| 2015 | 5,196,436 | -1.60% | 1,509,864 | 29.1% | 62,605 | State: Senate, House |
| 2014 | 5,281,011 | 0.78% | 2,194,346 | 41.6% | 123,221 | Federal: Senator (II), House |
| 2013 | 5,240,286 | -3.5% | 2,253,418 | 43.0% | 121,359 | State: Governor, Lieutenant Governor, Attorney General, House |
| 2012 | 5,428,833 | 6.1% | 3,858,043 | 71.06% | 447,907 | Federal: President, Senator (I), House |
| 2011 | 5,116,929 | 1.68% | 1,463,761 | 28.61% | 59,519 | State: Senate, House |
| 2010 | 5,032,144 | 1.54% | 2,214,503 | 44.01% | 106,888 | Federal: House |
| 2009 | 4,955,750 | -1.57% | 2,000,812 | 40.4% | 88,182 | State: Governor, Lieutenant Governor, Attorney General, House |
| 2008 | 5,034,660 | 10.7% | 3,723,260 | 74.0% | 506,672 | Federal: President, Senator (II), House |
| 2007 | 4,549,864 | 0.1% | 1,374,526 | 30.2% | 30,619 | State: Senate, House |
| 2006 | 4,554,683 | 2.3% | 2,398,589 | 52.7% | 116,629 | Federal: Senator (I), House |
| 2005 | 4,452,225 | 1.5% | 2,000,052 | 44.92% | 75,982 | State: Governor, Lieutenant Governor, Attorney General, House |
| 2004 | 4,517,980 | 7.1% | 3,198,367 | 70.79% | 222,059 | Federal: President, House |
| 2003 | 4,217,227 | 0.1% | 1,296,955 | 30.8% | 35,716 | State: Senate, House |
| 2002 | 4,219,957 | 2.7% | 1,331,915 | 31.56% | 44,493 | Federal: Senator (II), House |
| 2001 | 4,109,127 | 0.9% | 1,905,511 | 46.4% | 52,344 | State: Governor, Lieutenant Governor, Attorney General, House |
| 2000 | 4,073,644 | 7.0% | 2,739,447 | 67.2% | 150,414 | Federal: President, Senator (I), House |
| 1999 | 3,808,754 | 2.3% | 1,373,527 | 36.1% | 10,686 | State: Senate, House |
| 1998 | 3,724,683 | 4.5% | 1,229,139 | 33.0% | 31,494 | Federal: House |
| 1997 | 3,565,697 | 7.3% | 1,764,476 | 49.5% | 47,571 | State: Governor, Lieutenant Governor, Attorney General, House |
| 1996 * | 3,322,740 | 9.4% | 2,416,642 | 72.7% | 116,606 | Federal: President, Senator (II), House |
| 1995 | 3,038,394 | 1.3% | 1,585,783 | 52.2% | 45,785 | State: Senate, House |
| 1994 | 3,000,560 | 0.9% | 2,078,106 | 69.3% | 81,636 | Federal: Senator (I), House |
| 1993 | 2,975,121 | -2.6% * | 1,817,777 | 61.1% | 53,904 | State: Governor, Lieutenant Governor, Attorney General, House |
| 1992 | 3,055,486 | 9.4% | 2,558,665 | 83.7% | 141,123 | Federal: President, House |
| 1991 | 2,791,747 | 2.1% | 1,371,940 | 49.1% | unreported | State: Senate, House |
| 1990 | 2,735,339 | -0.1% | 1,252,971 | 45.8% | 25,785 | Federal: Senator (II), House |
| 1989 | 2,737,340 | -4.9% * | 1,821,242 | 66.5% | 54,177 | State: Governor, Lieutenant Governor, Attorney General, House |
| 1988 | 2,877,144 | 8.3% | 2,231,876 | 77.6% | 108,237 | Federal: President, Senator (I), House |
| 1987 | 2,657,412 | 1.8% | 1,571,110 | 59.1% | 38,505 | State: Senate, House |
| 1986 | 2,609,698 | 0.5% | 1,115,179 | 42.7% | 22,589 | Federal: House |
| 1985 | 2,597,904 | -2.9% * | 1,377,966 | 53.0% | 32,943 | State: Governor, Lieutenant Governor, Attorney General, House |
| 1984 | 2,675,641 | 14.8% | 2,180,515 | 81.5% | 113,686 | Federal: President, Senator (II), House |
| 1983 | 2,330,595 | 4.3% | 1,178,707 | 50.6% | unreported | State: Senate, House |
| 1982 | 2,234,011 | 0.9% | 1,454,628 | 65.1% | 32,340 | Federal: Senator (I), House; State: House |
| 1981 | 2,214,926 | -4.1% * | 1,437,382 | 64.90% | 30,584 | State: Governor, Lieutenant Governor, Attorney General, House |
| 1980 | 2,309,181 | 12.6% | 1,881,648 | 81.49% | 84,811 | Federal: President, House |
| 1979 | 2,050,499 | 1.2% | 1,059,158 | 51.65% | unreported | State: Senate, House |
| 1978 | 2,026,515 | 0.2% | 1,251,471 | 61.75% | 26,989 | Federal: Senator (II), House |
| 1977 | 2,022,619 | -4.8% * | 1,267,208 | 62.7% | 29,970 | State: Governor, Lieutenant Governor, Attorney General, House |
| 1976 | 2,123,849 | | 1,716,182 | 80.8% | unreported | Federal: President, Senator (I), House |

- The National Voter Registration Act of 1993 ("Motor Voter Act") was implemented in Virginia beginning in March 1996. This Act allowed voter registration forms to be submitted through Department of Motor Vehicles offices and other designated agencies, or to be submitted by mail. Also, prior to this, any Virginia voter who had not voted in four years was removed ("purged") from the electoral rolls.

== Regional differences ==
2006 Senatorial election majority results by county, with George Allen in red and Jim Webb in blue.

Northern Virginia has favored Democratic candidates in recent elections. In the 2004 United States presidential election, John Kerry won Fairfax County, long a Republican stronghold, by 2.4% and generally fared better in the rest of Northern Virginia than Al Gore did in 2000. Despite this increase, however, he still lost every other county except Arlington County in Northern Virginia. In contrast to the changing voting trend in Northern Virginia, the majority of the rest of Virginia has been supportive of the Republican Party. Some portions of the state like college towns and the southeastern counties in the Black Belt Region have been more likely to vote Democratic.

In 2005 and 2006, Democrats Tim Kaine (running for governor) and Jim Webb (in a race for Senator) won nearly all jurisdictions within the Northern Virginia region. Alexandria resident Mark Warner had not won so many jurisdictions when winning the governorship in 2001. By contrast, Warner performed comparatively strongly in rural areas, particularly Southwest Virginia. His campaign stressed respect for rural cultural values (such as gun rights) and strategies for economic development.

In the state's largest city, Virginia Beach (pop. 450,000), most elected officials are Republicans. However, most elected officials in the state's most populous county, Fairfax County (pop. 1,250,000), are Democrats. The Republican Party's strongholds are in the counties of Southwest Virginia, exurban Northern Virginia counties like Stafford, and Richmond suburbs like Hanover County. Democrats are dominant in the inner suburbs of Northern Virginia, the city of Charlottesville and its suburbs in Albemarle County, and industrial Hampton Roads cities of Norfolk, Portsmouth, Newport News, and Hampton, and also the city of Richmond. The three most significant "swing districts" are Loudoun and Prince William counties in Northern Virginia and Henrico County in the Richmond suburbs. All three of these "swing" counties voted for President George W. Bush in 2000 and 2004, Barack Obama in 2008 and 2012, and Hillary Clinton in 2016. Democrats have won formerly Republican-held seats in the General Assembly in Loudoun and Prince William counties in the 2017 and 2019 elections.

== See also ==
- 2026 Virginia elections
- Government of Virginia
- Politics of Virginia
- Virginia Department of Elections
- Political party strength in Virginia
- Women's suffrage in Virginia
