= 2012 United States presidential election in Virginia =

- November 6, 2012
- Turnout: 71.06% ▼

Nominee	Barack Obama	Mitt Romney
Party	Democratic	Republican
Home state	Illinois	Massachusetts
Running mate	Joe Biden	Paul Ryan
Electoral vote	13	0
Popular vote	1,971,820	1,822,522
Percentage	51.16%	47.28%

Obama
40–50%
50–60%
60–70%
70–80%
80–90%
90–100%
Romney
40–50%
50–60%
60–70%
70–80%
80–90%
90–100%
President before election
Barack Obama
Democratic
Elected President
Barack Obama
Democratic

The 2012 United States presidential election in Virginia took place on November 6, 2012, as part of the presidential election in which all 50 states plus the District of Columbia participated. Virginia voters chose 13 electors to represent them in the Electoral College via a popular vote pitting incumbent Democratic President Barack Obama and his running mate, Vice President Joe Biden, against Republican challenger and former Massachusetts Governor Mitt Romney and his running mate, Congressman Paul Ryan.

Virginia was won by Obama with 51.16% of the vote to Romney's 47.28%, a 3.88% margin of victory. Third parties and write-ins received a cumulative 60,147 votes, representing 1.56% of the vote. In 2008, Obama won the state by 6.30%, becoming the first Democratic presidential nominee to win it since Lyndon B. Johnson's nationwide Democratic landslide of 1964, but it had otherwise been a reliably Republican state prior to this. However, 2008 represented a realignment election for Virginia.

Much of the Democratic gains were attributed to the growth of progressive suburban Northern Virginia, particularly in Fairfax County, Loudoun County, and Prince William County, all of which voted for Obama twice despite becoming Republican strongholds after 1964. The Northern Virginia suburbs are generally dominated by Washington, D.C., the most Democratic region in the country. Obama's increased strength in this heavily populated region more than canceled out his weakness across rural Virginia, which, similar to the rest of Appalachia, swung towards the Republican Party in 2008 due to the Democrats' increasingly environmentalist policies. Obama suffered a historically poor showing even in traditionally Democratic counties of Southwest Virginia, similar to his weak performance in neighboring West Virginia.

Having also won the state in 2008, Obama's 2012 victory made him the first Democrat since Franklin D. Roosevelt in 1944 to carry Virginia in two consecutive elections. It also marked the first time since 1948 that the state voted Democratic in consecutive elections. The Democratic margin of victory also made 2012 the first time since 1948 that Virginia voted more Democratic than the nation as a whole, albeit by a narrow advantage of 0.02%, thereby making the state the closest to the national results. These were ultimately signs of Virginia's continuing leftward shift, after it had been a mostly reliable state for Republicans on the presidential level since 1952. Also, this election was the first since 1948 that Virginia voted for a different candidate than Indiana did.

As of the 2024 presidential election, this was the last time the Republican nominee won Montgomery County, and the last time the Democratic nominee won the independent city of Covington along with Buckingham, Caroline, Essex, Nelson and Westmoreland counties.

This was the last election that Virginia was considered to be a swing state. Every subsequent Democratic presidential nominee has won the state by more than a 5% margin, as Virginia has transformed into a blue state. In 2016, the Republican nominee won the election without carrying Virginia for the first time since 1924. By 2024, Virginia voted for a Democrat who lost the popular vote, also for the first time since 1924.

== Primary elections ==
=== Democratic primary ===
Because incumbent Democratic President Barack Obama faced no serious opposition from within his party in seeking reelection, no Democratic primary was held.

=== Republican primary ===
Virginia Republican primary, 2012
- March 6, 2012
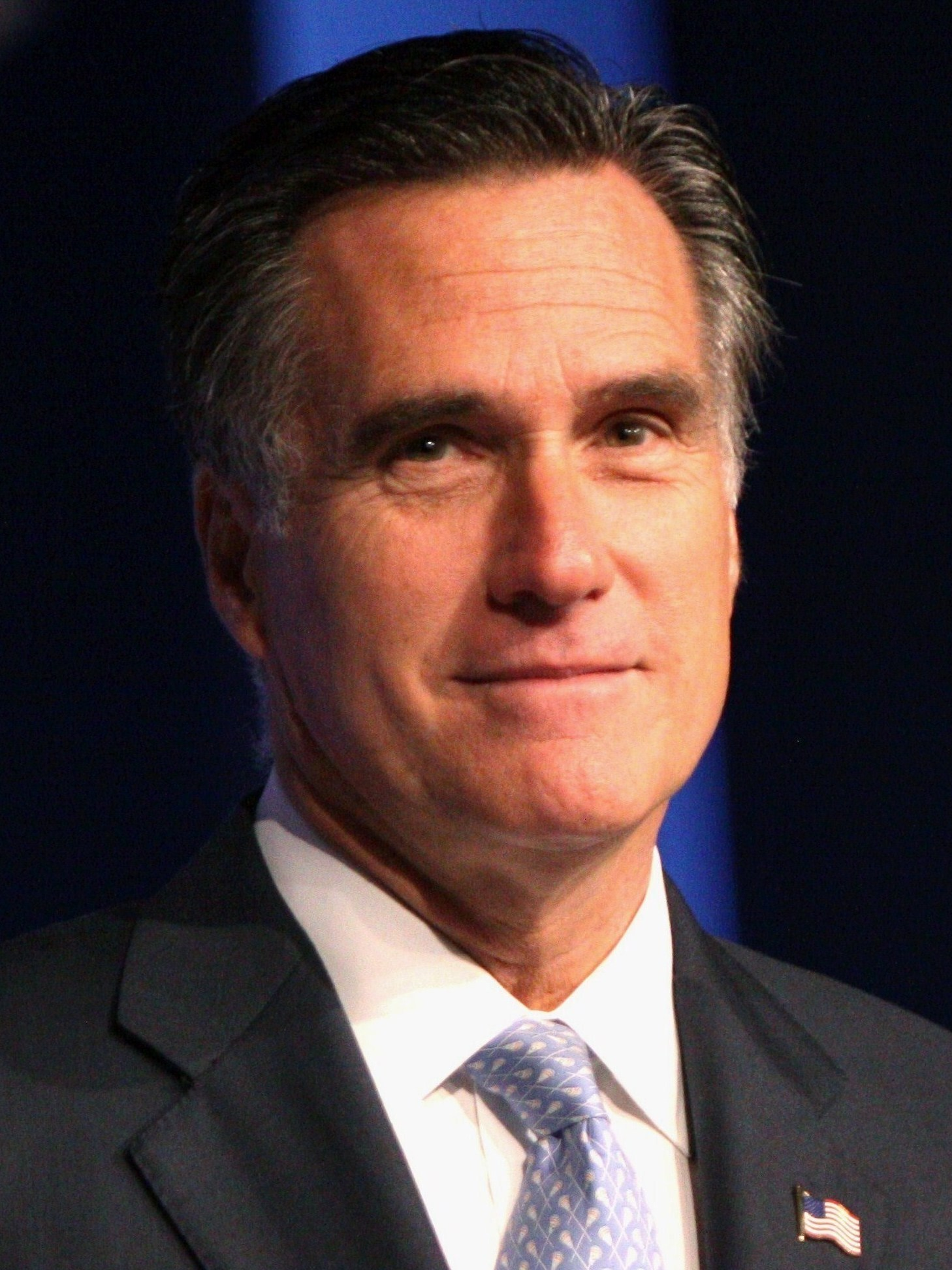

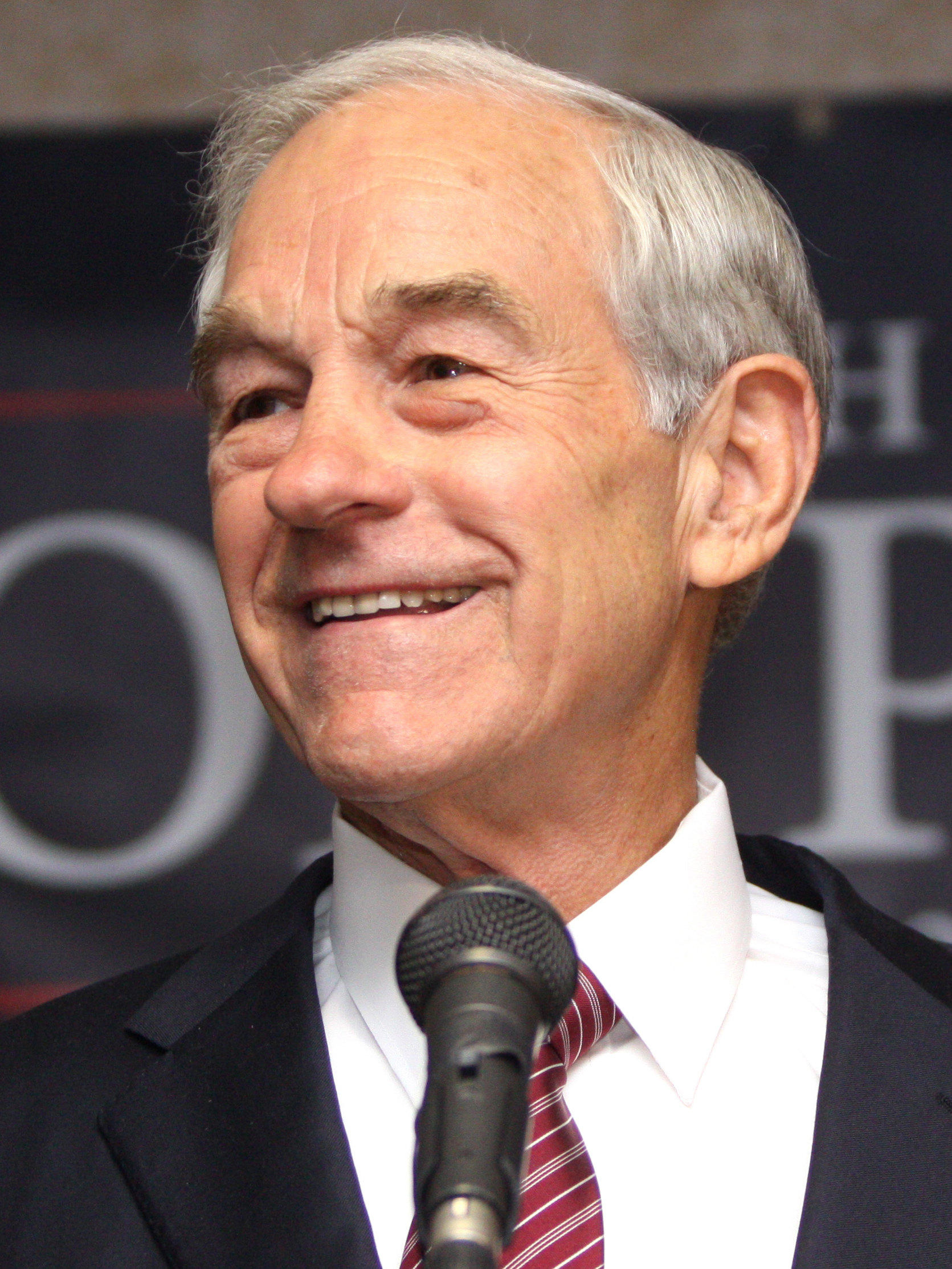
Candidate	Mitt Romney	Ron Paul
Home state	Massachusetts	Texas
Delegate count	43	3
Popular vote	158,119	107,451
Percentage	59.54%	40.46%
- Virginia results by county and independent city Mitt Romney Ron Paul

The Republican primary took place on Super Tuesday, March 6, 2012.

Virginia had 49 delegates to the 2012 Republican National Convention including the unbound superdelegates. 33 delegates were awarded on a winner-take-all basis by congressional district. The other 13 were awarded to the candidate who won a majority statewide, or allocated proportionally if no one got a majority.

Virginia Republican primary, March 6, 2012
Candidate	Votes	Percentage	Delegates
Mitt Romney	158,119	59.54%	43
Ron Paul	107,451	40.46%	3
Uncommitted delegates:			3
Total:	265,570	100.00%	49

==== Ballot access ====
Only Mitt Romney and Ron Paul appeared on the ballot. Other candidates failed to submit the necessary 10,000 signatures (including at least 400 from each of the state's 11 congressional districts) required to get on the ballot by the deadline of 22 December 2011.

On 27 December, Rick Perry filed a lawsuit – joined later by Michele Bachmann, Newt Gingrich, Jon Huntsman and Rick Santorum – in the federal District Court for the Eastern District of Virginia in Richmond that challenged provisions that determine who can appear on the primary ballot. Perry and the other candidates argued that the chairman of the Virginia Republican Party and members of State Board of Elections violated their rights by enforcing state requirements as to the number of signatures, the qualifications for signers and the requirement that all petition circulators be "an eligible or registered qualified voter in Virginia." Perry and the other litigants argued that these restrictions "impose a severe burden" on their freedoms of speech and association under the First and Fourteenth Amendment.

The case was Perry v. Judd. U.S. District Judge John A. Gibney Jr. ruled on 29 December that he would not issue an injunction to stop the printing of ballots before a scheduled hearing on 13 January. The Virginia Attorney General, Ken Cuccinelli, representing the state, made a motion to dismiss the case because of a lack of standing. On 13 January, Judge Gibney Jr. dismissed the lawsuit citing the equitable doctrine of laches ("sleeping on one's rights"), writing, "They knew the rules in Virginia many months ago... In essence, they played the game, lost, and then complained that the rules were unfair." The United States Court of Appeals for the Fourth Circuit affirmed, emphasizing that the candidate plaintiffs' failure to file in a timely fashion required dismissal.

The final results saw Romney win with 59.54% and 43 delegates of the vote to Ron Paul's 40.46% and 3 delegates.

== General election ==
=== Ballot access ===
- Barack Hussein Obama / Joseph Robinette Biden. Jr., Democratic
- Willard Mitt Romney / Paul Davis Ryan, Republican
- Gary Earl Johnson and James Polin Gray, Libertarian
- Virgil Hamlin Goode Jr. and James N. Clymer, Constitution
- Jill Ellen Stein and Cheri Lynn Honkala, Green

=== Polling ===
The initial polling in 2010 showed Obama leading with margins from 4 to 11 points. In September 2011, the tide changed, and Romney won every poll conducted from September 2011 to December 2011, except one. In January and February 2012, both candidates were neck and neck with neither having a decisive lead. In March, Obama was able to pull ahead and beat Romney in most polls until about late September 2012. On October 4, Romney won his first poll in a month, 48% to 45%. Throughout October, Romney won every poll but one for nearly three weeks. The latest polls in late October and early November shifted in Obama's favor, and Obama was able to successfully make the race near tied. Although Romney had won the final poll by 2 points, 50% to 48%, the average of the last three polls showed Obama leading 49% to 48%.

=== Predictions ===
Source	Ranking	As of
Huffington Post	Lean D	November 6, 2012
CNN	Tossup	November 6, 2012
New York Times	Tossup	November 6, 2012
Washington Post	Tossup	November 6, 2012
RealClearPolitics	Tossup	November 6, 2012
Sabato's Crystal Ball	Lean R (flip)	November 5, 2012
FiveThirtyEight	Likely D	November 6, 2012

=== Results ===
United States presidential election in Virginia, 2012
Party	Candidate	Running mate	Votes	Percentage	Electoral votes
Democratic	Barack Obama (incumbent)	Joe Biden (incumbent)	1,971,820	51.16%	13
Republican	Mitt Romney	Paul Ryan	1,822,522	47.28%	0
Libertarian	Gary Johnson	Jim Gray	31,216	0.81%	0
Constitution	Virgil Goode	Jim Clymer	13,058	0.34%	0
Green	Jill Stein	Cheri Honkala	8,627	0.22%	0
Write-ins	Write-ins		7,246	0.19%	0
Totals			3,854,489	100.00%	13

==== By city and county ====
County/city	Barack Obama Democratic		Mitt Romney Republican		Other candidates Various parties		Margin		Total
County/city	#	%	#	%	#	%	#	%	Total
Accomack	7,655	47.69%	8,213	51.17%	183	1.14%	-558	-3.48%	16,051
Albemarle	29,757	55.20%	23,297	43.22%	853	1.58%	6,460	11.98%	53,907
Alexandria	52,199	71.11%	20,249	27.58%	963	1.31%	31,950	43.53%	73,411
Alleghany	3,403	47.44%	3,595	50.12%	175	2.44%	-192	-2.68%	7,173
Amelia	2,490	36.01%	4,331	62.63%	94	1.36%	-1,841	-26.62%	6,915
Amherst	5,900	39.41%	8,876	59.29%	194	1.30%	-2,976	-19.88%	14,970
Appomattox	2,453	30.91%	5,340	67.30%	142	1.79%	-2,887	-36.39%	7,935
Arlington	81,269	69.10%	34,474	29.31%	1,865	1.59%	46,795	39.79%	117,608
Augusta	9,451	28.07%	23,624	70.16%	597	1.77%	-14,173	-42.09%	33,672
Bath	894	40.22%	1,274	57.31%	55	2.47%	-380	-17.09%	2,223
Bedford	10,209	27.28%	26,679	71.29%	537	1.43%	-16,470	-44.01%	37,425
Bland	735	24.93%	2,144	72.73%	69	2.34%	-1,409	-47.80%	2,948
Botetourt	5,452	29.89%	12,479	68.41%	310	1.70%	-7,027	-38.52%	18,241
Bristol	2,492	33.73%	4,780	64.71%	115	1.56%	-2,288	-30.98%	7,387
Brunswick	4,994	62.14%	2,968	36.93%	75	0.93%	2,026	25.21%	8,037
Buchanan	3,094	32.08%	6,436	66.72%	116	1.20%	-3,342	-34.64%	9,646
Buckingham	3,750	50.29%	3,569	47.86%	138	1.85%	181	2.43%	7,457
Buena Vista	919	36.38%	1,564	61.92%	43	1.70%	-645	-25.54%	2,526
Campbell	7,595	29.56%	17,695	68.86%	406	1.58%	-10,100	-39.30%	25,696
Caroline	7,276	53.30%	6,151	45.06%	225	1.64%	1,125	8.24%	13,652
Carroll	3,685	28.53%	8,736	67.63%	497	3.84%	-5,051	-39.10%	12,918
Charles City	2,772	65.50%	1,396	32.99%	64	1.51%	1,376	32.51%	4,232
Charlotte	2,503	42.44%	3,311	56.14%	84	1.42%	-808	-13.70%	5,898
Charlottesville	16,510	75.74%	4,844	22.22%	443	2.04%	11,666	53.52%	21,797
Chesapeake	55,052	49.85%	53,900	48.81%	1,473	1.34%	1,152	1.04%	110,425
Chesterfield	77,694	45.44%	90,934	53.18%	2,360	1.38%	-13,240	-7.74%	170,988
Clarke	3,239	41.73%	4,296	55.35%	227	2.92%	-1,057	-13.62%	7,762
Colonial Heights	2,544	29.50%	5,941	68.89%	139	1.61%	-3,397	-39.39%	8,624
Covington	1,319	56.61%	975	41.85%	36	1.55%	344	14.76%	2,330
Craig	830	31.12%	1,757	65.88%	80	3.00%	-927	-34.76%	2,667
Culpeper	8,285	40.99%	11,580	57.30%	346	1.71%	-3,295	-16.31%	20,211
Cumberland	2,422	47.98%	2,538	50.28%	88	1.74%	-116	-2.30%	5,048
Danville	12,218	60.47%	7,763	38.42%	223	1.11%	4,455	22.05%	20,204
Dickenson	2,473	35.82%	4,274	61.91%	157	2.27%	-1,801	-26.09%	6,904
Dinwiddie	6,550	48.20%	6,875	50.59%	164	1.21%	-325	-2.39%	13,589
Emporia	1,793	66.51%	886	32.86%	17	0.63%	907	33.65%	2,696
Essex	3,016	53.15%	2,602	45.85%	57	1.00%	414	7.30%	5,675
Fairfax	315,273	59.57%	206,773	39.07%	7,241	1.36%	108,500	20.50%	529,287
Fairfax City	6,651	57.19%	4,775	41.06%	203	1.75%	1,876	16.13%	11,629
Falls Church	5,015	68.93%	2,147	29.51%	114	1.56%	2,868	39.42%	7,276
Fauquier	13,965	39.28%	21,034	59.16%	556	1.56%	-7,069	-19.88%	35,555
Floyd	2,732	35.74%	4,673	61.13%	239	3.13%	-1,941	-25.39%	7,644
Fluvanna	5,893	46.22%	6,678	52.38%	178	1.40%	-785	-6.16%	12,749
Franklin	9,090	34.04%	16,718	62.60%	899	3.36%	-7,628	-28.56%	26,707
Franklin City	2,833	64.98%	1,496	34.31%	31	0.71%	1,337	30.67%	4,360
Frederick	12,690	34.87%	22,858	62.81%	846	2.32%	-10,168	-27.94%	36,394
Fredericksburg	7,131	62.35%	4,060	35.50%	246	2.15%	3,071	26.85%	11,437
Galax	900	39.53%	1,332	58.50%	45	1.97%	-432	-18.97%	2,277
Giles	2,730	36.12%	4,660	61.66%	168	2.22%	-1,930	-25.54%	7,558
Gloucester	6,764	35.08%	12,137	62.94%	382	1.98%	-5,373	-27.86%	19,283
Goochland	4,676	35.12%	8,448	63.45%	191	1.43%	-3,772	-28.33%	13,315
Grayson	2,068	29.04%	4,801	67.42%	252	3.54%	-2,733	-38.38%	7,121
Greene	3,290	36.46%	5,569	61.72%	164	1.82%	-2,279	-25.26%	9,023
Greensville	3,135	63.64%	1,766	35.85%	25	0.51%	1,369	27.79%	4,926
Halifax	7,766	46.53%	8,694	52.08%	232	1.39%	-928	-5.55%	16,692
Hampton	46,966	70.64%	18,640	28.03%	884	1.33%	28,326	42.61%	66,490
Hanover	18,294	30.98%	39,940	67.63%	824	1.39%	-21,646	-36.65%	59,058
Harrisonburg	8,654	55.50%	6,565	42.10%	374	2.40%	2,089	13.40%	15,593
Henrico	89,594	55.22%	70,449	43.42%	2,198	1.36%	19,145	11.80%	162,241
Henry	10,317	41.33%	13,984	56.02%	662	2.65%	-3,667	-14.69%	24,963
Highland	459	32.48%	924	65.39%	30	2.13%	-465	-32.91%	1,413
Hopewell	5,179	57.35%	3,739	41.40%	113	1.25%	1,440	15.95%	9,031
Isle of Wight	8,761	42.07%	11,802	56.67%	264	1.26%	-3,041	-14.60%	20,827
James City	17,879	43.35%	22,843	55.39%	518	1.26%	-4,964	-12.04%	41,240
King and Queen	1,745	47.74%	1,865	51.03%	45	1.23%	-120	-3.29%	3,655
King George	4,477	39.53%	6,604	58.31%	244	2.16%	-2,127	-18.78%	11,325
King William	3,344	37.48%	5,466	61.26%	113	1.26%	-2,122	-23.78%	8,923
Lancaster	3,149	45.24%	3,753	53.91%	59	0.85%	-604	-8.67%	6,961
Lee	2,583	26.91%	6,847	71.34%	168	1.75%	-4,264	-44.43%	9,598
Lexington	1,486	55.30%	1,146	42.65%	55	2.05%	340	12.65%	2,687
Loudoun	82,479	51.53%	75,292	47.04%	2,289	1.43%	7,187	4.49%	160,060
Louisa	6,953	42.26%	9,215	56.01%	284	1.73%	-2,262	-13.75%	16,452
Lunenburg	2,684	46.81%	2,969	51.78%	81	1.41%	-285	-4.97%	5,734
Lynchburg	15,948	43.76%	19,806	54.34%	694	1.90%	-3,858	-10.58%	36,448
Madison	2,639	39.90%	3,869	58.50%	106	1.60%	-1,230	-18.60%	6,614
Manassas	8,478	55.78%	6,463	42.52%	259	1.70%	2,015	13.26%	15,200
Manassas Park	2,879	61.83%	1,699	36.49%	78	1.68%	1,180	25.34%	4,656
Martinsville	3,855	61.35%	2,312	36.79%	117	1.86%	1,543	24.56%	6,284
Mathews	1,807	33.62%	3,488	64.91%	79	1.47%	-1,681	-31.29%	5,374
Mecklenburg	6,921	45.90%	7,973	52.88%	183	1.22%	-1,052	-6.98%	15,077
Middlesex	2,370	38.98%	3,619	59.52%	91	1.50%	-1,249	-20.54%	6,080
Montgomery	19,903	48.53%	20,006	48.78%	1,100	2.69%	-103	-0.25%	41,009
Nelson	4,171	50.56%	3,947	47.84%	132	1.60%	224	2.72%	8,250
New Kent	3,555	32.46%	7,246	66.16%	152	1.38%	-3,691	-33.70%	10,953
Newport News	51,100	64.32%	27,230	34.28%	1,114	1.40%	23,870	30.04%	79,444
Norfolk	62,687	72.02%	23,147	26.59%	1,209	1.39%	39,540	45.43%	87,043
Northampton	3,741	57.63%	2,676	41.23%	74	1.14%	1,065	16.40%	6,491
Northumberland	3,191	42.22%	4,310	57.03%	57	0.75%	-1,119	-14.81%	7,558
Norton	566	37.94%	895	59.99%	31	2.07%	-329	-22.05%	1,492
Nottoway	3,344	48.85%	3,409	49.80%	93	1.35%	-65	-0.95%	6,846
Orange	6,870	42.01%	9,244	56.52%	240	1.47%	-2,374	-14.51%	16,354
Page	3,724	36.41%	6,344	62.03%	160	1.56%	-2,620	-25.62%	10,228
Patrick	2,417	29.27%	5,622	68.07%	220	2.66%	-3,205	-38.80%	8,259
Petersburg	14,283	89.79%	1,527	9.60%	98	0.61%	12,756	80.19%	15,908
Pittsylvania	10,858	35.39%	19,263	62.78%	560	1.83%	-8,405	-27.39%	30,681
Poquoson	1,679	23.63%	5,312	74.75%	115	1.62%	-3,633	-51.12%	7,106
Portsmouth	32,501	70.77%	12,858	28.00%	563	1.23%	19,643	42.77%	45,922
Powhatan	4,088	26.33%	11,200	72.14%	237	1.53%	-7,112	-45.81%	15,525
Prince Edward	5,132	55.55%	3,952	42.78%	155	1.67%	1,180	12.77%	9,239
Prince George	6,991	43.57%	8,879	55.33%	176	1.10%	-1,888	-11.76%	16,046
Prince William	103,331	57.34%	74,458	41.32%	2,406	1.34%	28,873	16.02%	180,195
Pulaski	5,292	36.05%	8,920	60.76%	468	3.19%	-3,628	-24.71%	14,680
Radford	2,732	50.60%	2,520	46.68%	147	2.72%	212	3.92%	5,399
Rappahannock	1,980	45.44%	2,311	53.04%	66	1.52%	-331	-7.60%	4,357
Richmond	1,574	41.75%	2,160	57.29%	36	0.96%	-586	-15.54%	3,770
Richmond City	75,921	77.81%	20,050	20.55%	1,598	1.64%	55,871	57.26%	97,569
Roanoke	18,711	36.53%	31,624	61.75%	882	1.72%	-12,913	-25.22%	51,217
Roanoke City	24,134	60.10%	14,991	37.33%	1,030	2.57%	9,143	22.77%	40,155
Rockbridge	4,088	40.17%	5,898	57.95%	191	1.88%	-1,810	-17.78%	10,177
Rockingham	10,065	28.87%	24,186	69.37%	615	1.76%	-14,121	-40.50%	34,866
Russell	3,718	30.76%	8,180	67.67%	190	1.57%	-4,462	-36.91%	12,088
Salem	4,760	38.64%	7,299	59.25%	259	2.11%	-2,539	-20.61%	12,318
Scott	2,395	23.97%	7,439	74.45%	158	1.58%	-5,044	-50.48%	9,992
Shenandoah	6,469	33.39%	12,538	64.72%	366	1.89%	-6,069	-31.33%	19,373
Smyth	4,171	32.64%	8,379	65.58%	227	1.78%	-4,208	-32.94%	12,777
Southampton	4,437	47.90%	4,733	51.09%	94	1.01%	-296	-3.19%	9,264
Spotsylvania	25,165	43.41%	31,844	54.93%	965	1.66%	-6,679	-11.52%	57,974
Stafford	27,182	44.87%	32,480	53.61%	921	1.52%	-5,298	-8.74%	60,583
Staunton	5,728	51.10%	5,272	47.03%	210	1.87%	456	4.07%	11,210
Suffolk	24,267	57.01%	17,820	41.86%	479	1.13%	6,447	15.15%	42,566
Surry	2,576	59.80%	1,671	38.79%	61	1.41%	905	21.01%	4,308
Sussex	3,358	61.73%	2,021	37.15%	61	1.12%	1,337	24.58%	5,440
Tazewell	3,661	20.65%	13,843	78.07%	228	1.28%	-10,182	-57.42%	17,732
Virginia Beach	94,299	47.95%	99,291	50.49%	3,051	1.56%	-4,992	-2.54%	196,641
Warren	6,452	38.64%	9,869	59.10%	377	2.26%	-3,417	-20.46%	16,698
Washington	7,076	27.61%	18,141	70.77%	415	1.62%	-11,065	-43.16%	25,632
Waynesboro	3,840	43.68%	4,790	54.49%	161	1.83%	-950	-10.81%	8,791
Westmoreland	4,295	52.89%	3,731	45.95%	94	1.16%	564	6.94%	8,120
Williamsburg	4,903	63.28%	2,682	34.62%	163	2.10%	2,221	28.66%	7,748
Winchester	5,094	49.48%	4,946	48.04%	256	2.48%	148	1.44%	10,296
Wise	3,760	25.04%	11,076	73.75%	182	1.21%	-7,316	-48.71%	15,018
Wythe	3,783	30.61%	8,324	67.36%	251	2.03%	-4,541	-36.75%	12,358
York	13,183	38.83%	20,204	59.51%	566	1.66%	-7,021	-20.68%	33,953
Totals	1,971,820	51.16%	1,822,522	47.28%	60,147	1.56%	149,298	3.88%	3,854,489

===== Counties and independent cities that flipped from Democratic to Republican =====
- King and Queen (largest community: King and Queen Court House)
- Montgomery (largest town: Blacksburg)

==== By congressional district ====
Despite losing the state, Romney won seven of 11 congressional districts, while Obama won four, including one held by a Republican.

District	Romney	Obama	Representative
1st	53%	46%	Rob Wittman
2nd	49%	50%	Scott Rigell
3rd	20%	79%	Bobby Scott
4th	50%	49%	Randy Forbes
5th	53%	46%	Robert Hurt
6th	59%	39%	Bob Goodlatte
7th	57%	42%	Eric Cantor
8th	31%	68%	Jim Moran
9th	63%	35%	Morgan Griffith
10th	50%	49%	Frank Wolf
11th	36%	62%	Gerry Connolly

== Analysis ==
This was the first election since 1976 in which Virginia did not vote in the same way as neighboring North Carolina, and the first election ever in which Virginia voted Democratic while North Carolina voted Republican, which has occurred again in every subsequent election. Virginia was the only state that backed Obama twice that didn't back Bill Clinton in either of his runs for president in 1992 and 1996.

Despite Indiana and neighboring North Carolina flipping back into the Republican column, Virginia remained in the Democratic column, voting for President Obama with a margin of 3.88%, albeit a reduced margin from 2008 when he carried it by 6.30%. 2008 was the first time a Democrat carried the state of Virginia since Lyndon B. Johnson carried it in his landslide 1964 election. Republican support, which had been anchored by the historically Republican D.C. suburbs, dwindled as the population grew. According to 270toWin, Obama carried Northern Virginia by 59.8% to Romney's 38.8%, a 21% margin, a great improvement from Al Gore's 3.2% win against George W. Bush in 2000 and John Kerry's 7.9% win against Bush in 2004. The leftward shift of college-educated whites and dominance by the unabashedly liberal District of Columbia only furthered Democratic margins. Widening margins in Northern Virginia allowed Obama to counteract losses in Southwest Virginia as the Democrats increasingly supported environmentalist policies making them unpopular amongst Appalachian voters. Consequently, Democrats were able to comfortably carry it in every election following 2008: a Republican wouldn't win statewide public office in Virginia until Glenn Youngkin won the 2021 gubernatorial election.

According to exit polls from The New York Times, voter demographics were split. Romney carried men 51-47 while Obama carried women 54–45. Men and women make up 47% and 53% of the electorate, respectively. While Romney expectedly carried white voters in a 61-37 landslide, Obama was able to offset these wins with 93–6, 64–33, and 66-32 landslides among African Americans, Hispanics, and Asians, respectively. Cumulatively, these minorities consisted of 28% of the electorate. Splits among age groups were also obvious: voters 18 to 29 and 30 to 44 favored Obama 61-36 and 54–45, respectively, while voters aged 46–64 favored the Republican ticket 53-44 and 65+ favored them 54–46. Romney was able to carry three of four education groups: those with no, some, or a college degree favored Romney by narrow margins of 50–49, 51–47, and 50–48, respectively, but Obama canceled out these wins with a 57–42 win among postgraduates. Respectively, these groups comprise 46%, 25%, 30%, and 24% of voters. Self-identified moderates were carried by Obama 56–42, but Independents flipped back into the Republican column, backing Romney 54–43 after backing Obama by 1 percentage point in 2008.

Economic status also showed a clear political divide in exit polls. The president's strength came from lower-income voters: he carried those with an income under $30,000 by 61-38 and an income $30,000 to $50,000 by 60–38. Meanwhile, Romney carried those making over $50,000 by 52-47 and over $100,000 by 51–47. However, Romney's close win among the upper middle class was a good sign for Democrats: Bush carried them 57–43 in 2004, a 14-point win, and it solidified suburban Northern Virginia's shift left.

In terms of county performance, Romney flipped two counties back into the Republican column, including Montgomery, home to Virginia Tech in Blacksburg. King and Queen County also returned to the Republican column, thereby making Obama the first Democrat to win the White House without carrying this county. Obama racked up his greatest margins in independent cities, where he received upwards of 70% of the vote in many of them. Petersburg gave 89.79% of its vote to the Democratic ticket. On the opposite end of the spectrum, Romney's best performances were in Southwest Virginia and the Shenandoah Valley, where he garnered over 60% of ballots cast.

Despite polls predicting a close race, Obama's comfortable margin in Virginia solidified the state's shift to the Democrats. In 2016, Democrat Hillary Clinton would win the state by 5.32% against Donald Trump, one of the few states where she improved on Obama's margins despite losing the election nationwide. In 2020, Joe Biden won the state by 10.11%, the best margin for a Democrat since Franklin D. Roosevelt's 24.97% margin in 1944.

2012 Virginia presidential election (New York Times)
Demographic subgroup	Obama	Romney	% of total vote
Ideology
Liberals	92	7	24
Moderates	56	42	45
Conservatives	11	87	31
Party
Democrats	94	6	39
Republicans	5	94	32
Independents	43	54	29
Age
18–29 years old	61	36	19
30–44 years old	54	45	27
45–64 years old	46	53	41
65 and older	46	54	14
Gender
Men	47	51	47
Women	54	45	53
Marital status
Married	44	55	62
Unmarried	61	37	38
Race/ethnicity
White	37	61	70
Black	93	6	20
Latino	64	33	5
Asian	66	32	3
Education
Never attended college	49	50	46
Some college education	47	51	25
College graduate	48	50	30
Advanced degree	57	42	24
Income
Under $30K	61	38	18
$30K-$49K	60	38	18
$50K or more	47	52	65
$100K or more	47	51	34

== See also ==
- Republican Party presidential debates, 2012
- Republican Party presidential primaries, 2012
- Results of the 2012 Republican Party presidential primaries
- Virginia Republican Party
