= 1844 United States presidential election in Virginia =

- November 4, 1844

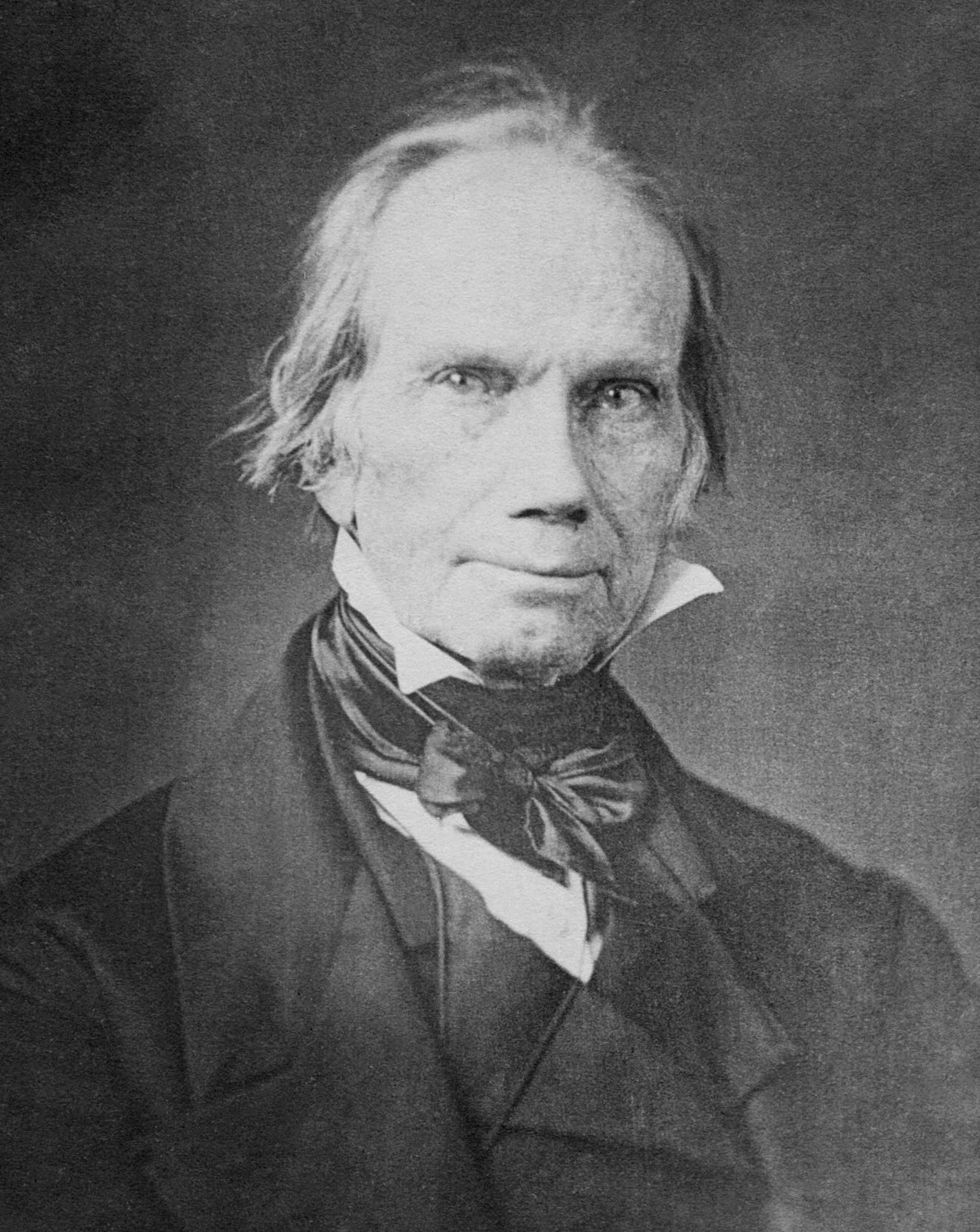
Nominee	James K. Polk	Henry Clay
Party	Democratic	Whig
Home state	Tennessee	Kentucky
Running mate	George M. Dallas	Theodore Frelinghuysen
Electoral vote	17	0
Popular vote	50,679	44,860
Percentage	53.05%	46.95%
County results
Polk
50–60%
60–70%
70–80%
80–90%
90–100%
Clay
50–60%
60–70%
70–80%
80–90%
President before election
John Tyler
Whig
Elected President
James K. Polk
Democratic

A presidential election was held in Virginia on November 4, 1844, as part of the 1844 United States presidential election. Voters chose 17 representatives, or electors to the Electoral College, who voted for President and Vice President.

Virginia voted for the Democratic candidate, James K. Polk, over Whig candidate Henry Clay. Polk won Virginia by a margin of 6.10%.

== Results ==
1844 United States presidential election in Virginia
Party	Candidate	Votes	Percentage	Electoral votes
Democratic	James K. Polk	50,679	53.05%	17
Whig	Henry Clay	44,860	46.95%	0
Totals		95,539	100.0%	17

== See also ==
- United States presidential elections in Virginia
