= 2010 Virginia elections =

- November 2, 2010

Elections in Virginia for the 2010 election cycle held on Tuesday, November 2, 2010. Primary elections were held on June 8.

City and town elections were held on May 4. Three special elections were also held:

- June 15, 2010: House of Delegates 26th District
- June 15, 2010: House of Delegates 27th District
- July 13, 2010: City of Portsmouth

== Federal ==
=== United States House ===
All 11 Virginia seats in the United States House of Representatives are up for election in 2010.

== State ==
=== State House of Delegates ===
Two seats in the Virginia House of Delegates were up in special elections in 2010. Regular delegate elections are held every two years; the last election took place on November 3, 2009.

=== Judicial positions ===
One Virginia Supreme Court seat will be up for election in 2010, due to retirement. Supreme Court justices in Virginia must be elected by the state legislature, though the governor may appoint them.

- Virginia judicial elections, 2010 at Judgepedia

=== Ballot measures ===
At least three measures have been certified for the November 2, 2010 statewide election:

- Question 1 - Exempt elderly from property taxes
- Question 2 - Exempt veterans from property taxes
- Question 3 - Increase the permissible size of the Revenue Stabilization Fund

Virginia 2010 ballot measures at Ballotpedia

== Local ==
Many elections for county offices were also held on November 2, 2010.
