= 1848 United States presidential election in Virginia =

- November 7, 1848
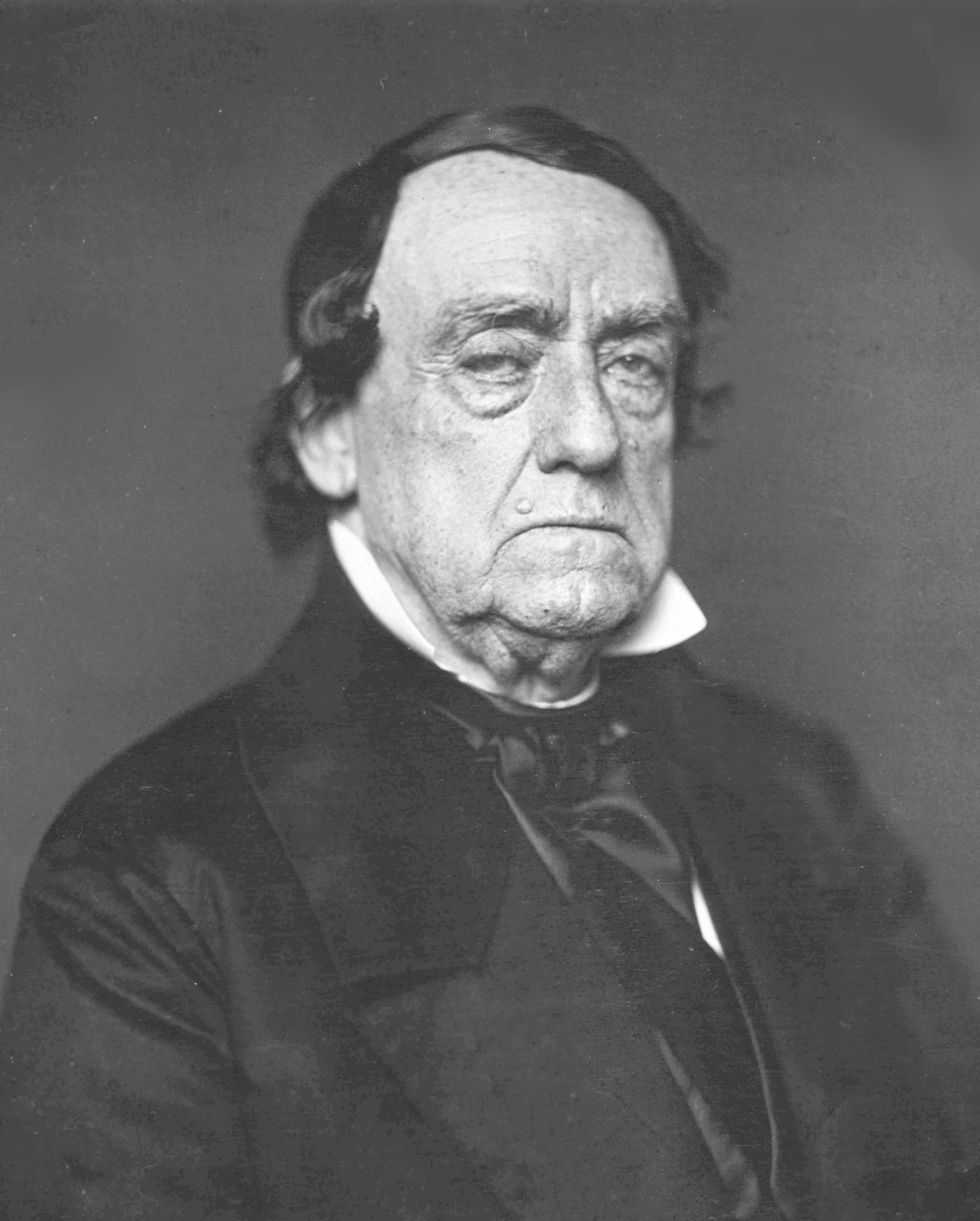

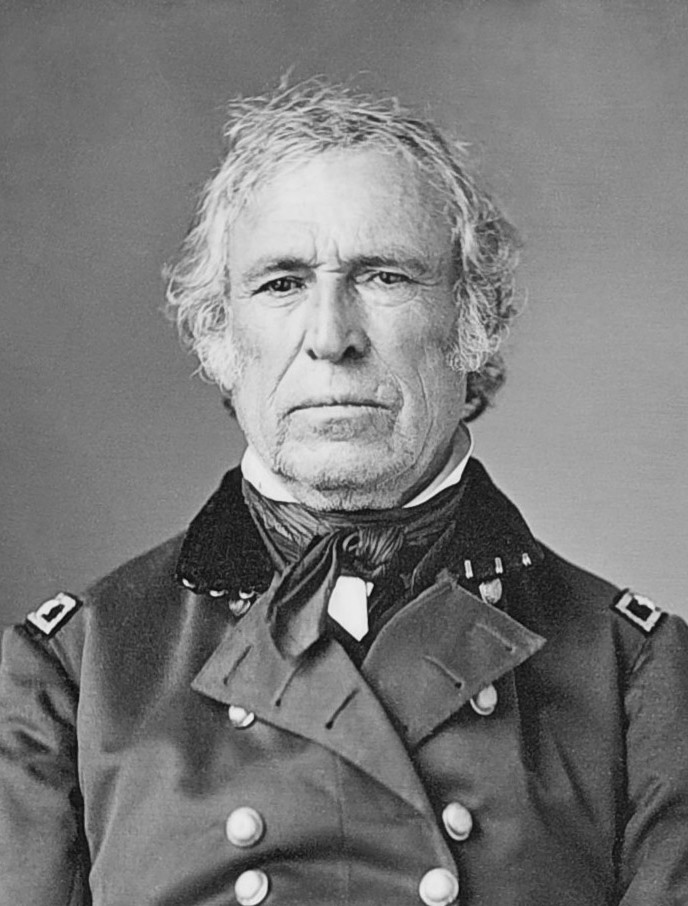
Nominee	Lewis Cass	Zachary Taylor
Party	Democratic	Whig
Home state	Michigan	Louisiana
Running mate	William O. Butler	Millard Fillmore
Electoral vote	17	0
Popular vote	46,739	45,265
Percentage	50.80%	49.20%
County results
Cass
50–60%
60–70%
70–80%
80–90%
90–100%
Taylor
50–60%
60–70%
70–80%
80–90%
President before election
James K. Polk
Democratic
Elected President
Zachary Taylor
Whig

The 1848 United States presidential election in Virginia took place on November 7, 1848, as part of the 1848 United States presidential election. Voters chose 17 representatives, or electors to the Electoral College, who voted for President and Vice President.

Virginia was a closely contested state during this election and narrowly voted for the Democratic candidate, former U.S. Senator Lewis Cass over the Whig candidate, military general Zachary Taylor. Cass won the state with a margin of 1.60%. As of 2024, this is the last election in which Morgan County, now part of West Virginia, voted for the Democratic candidate.

== Results ==
1848 United States presidential election in Virginia
Party	Candidate	Votes	Percentage	Electoral votes
Democratic	Lewis Cass	46,739	50.80%	17
Whig	Zachary Taylor	45,265	49.20%	0
Totals		92,004	100.0%	17

== See also ==
- United States presidential elections in Virginia
