= 1852 United States presidential election in Virginia =

- November 2, 1852

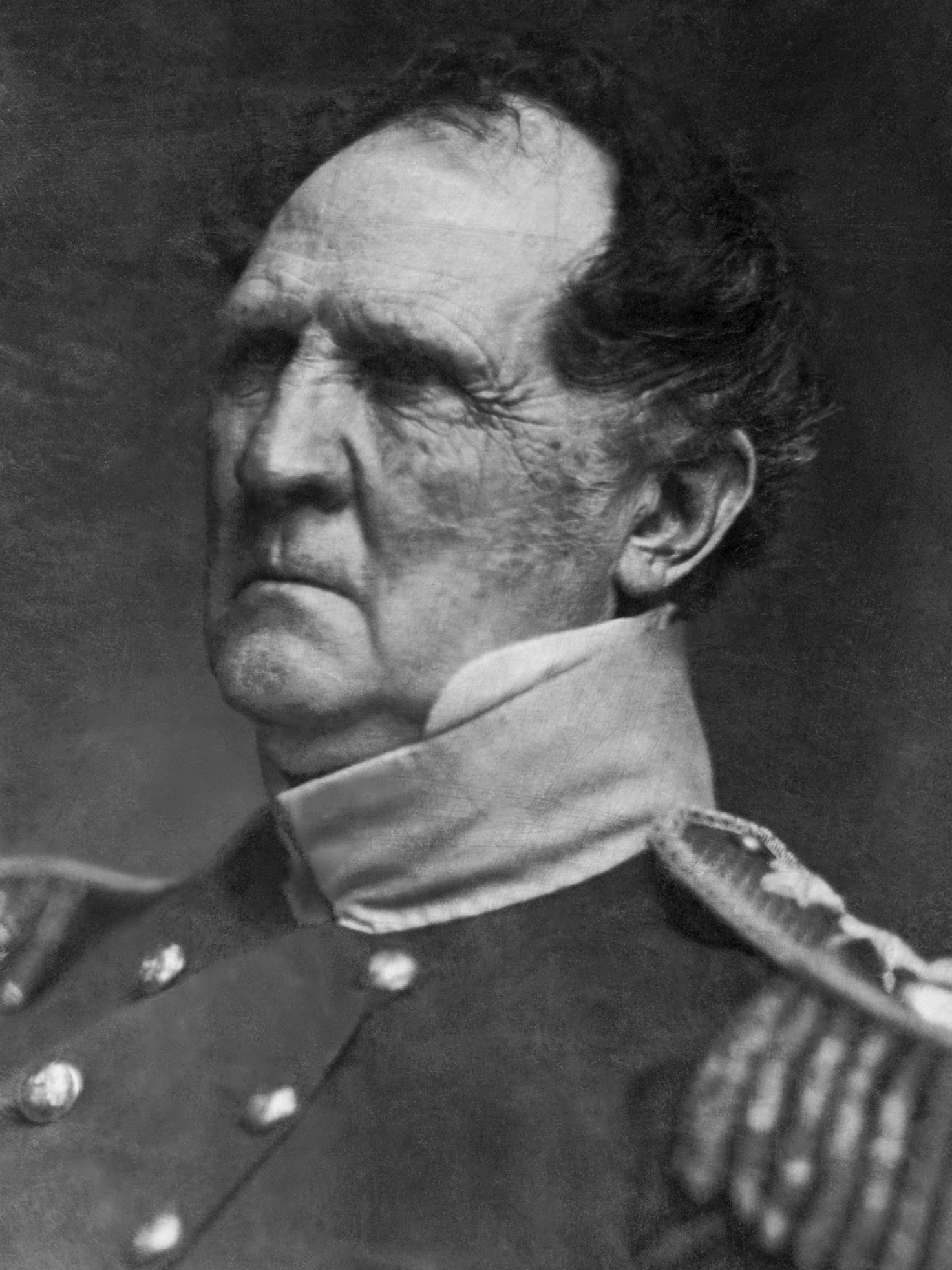
Nominee	Franklin Pierce	Winfield Scott
Party	Democratic	Whig
Home state	New Hampshire	New Jersey
Running mate	William R. King	William Alexander Graham
Electoral vote	15	0
Popular vote	73,872	58,732
Percentage	55.71%	44.29%
County results
Pierce
50–60%
60–70%
70–80%
80–90%
Scott
50–60%
60–70%
70–80%
80–90%
President before election
Millard Fillmore
Whig
Elected President
Franklin Pierce
Democratic

The 1852 United States presidential election in Virginia took place on November 2, 1852, as part of the 1852 United States presidential election. Voters chose 15 representatives, or electors to the Electoral College, who voted for President and Vice President.

Virginia voted for the Democratic candidate, former U.S. Senator Franklin Pierce over the Whig candidate, military lieutenant general Winfield Scott. Pierce won the state by a margin of 11.42%.

== Results ==
1852 United States presidential election in Virginia
Party	Candidate	Votes	Percentage	Electoral votes
Democratic	Franklin Pierce	73,872	55.71%	15
Whig	Winfield Scott	58,732	44.29%	0
Totals		132,604	100.0%	15

== See also ==
- United States presidential elections in Virginia
