= 2004 United States presidential election in Virginia =

- November 2, 2004
- Turnout: 70.79%

Nominee	George W. Bush	John Kerry
Party	Republican	Democratic
Home state	Texas	Massachusetts
Running mate	Dick Cheney	John Edwards
Electoral vote	13	0
Popular vote	1,716,959	1,454,742
Percentage	53.68%	45.48%

Bush
40–50%
50–60%
60–70%
70–80%
80–90%
Kerry
40–50%
50–60%
60–70%
70–80%
80–90%
90–100%
Tie/No Data
President before election
George W. Bush
Republican
Elected President
George W. Bush
Republican

The 2004 United States presidential election in Virginia took place on November 2, 2004, and was part of the 2004 United States presidential election. Voters chose 13 representatives, or electors to the Electoral College, who voted for president and vice president.

Virginia was won by incumbent President George W. Bush by an 8.20% margin of victory. Prior to the election, all 12 news organizations considered this a state Bush would win, or otherwise a red state. The state had voted for the Republican candidate in all presidential elections since 1952 except for 1964's Democratic landslide. This pattern continued in 2004, although it would be broken four years later by the Democratic victory in 2008.

As of the 2024 presidential election, this is the last time that Virginia has voted for a Republican candidate in a presidential election (or in any federal statewide election). This is also the last time Virginia and West Virginia have voted for the same presidential candidate.

This was also the last time Buchanan County and Dickenson County would vote Democratic for president; and the last time Loudoun County, Prince William County, and Henrico County, and the independent cities of Winchester, Radford, Staunton, Harrisonburg, Manassas, Suffolk, Hopewell, and Manassas Park, would vote Republican for president.

Kerry narrowly won Northern Virginia, which would transform into a Democratic stronghold in 2008. Bush became the first Republican to win the White House without carrying Fairfax County since Calvin Coolidge in 1924.

== Primaries ==
- 2004 Virginia Democratic presidential primary

== Campaign ==
=== Predictions ===
There were 12 news organizations who made state-by-state predictions of the election. Here are their last predictions before election day.

Source	Ranking
D.C. Political Report	Solid R
Associated Press	Lean R
CNN	Likely R
Cook Political Report	Lean R
Newsweek	Lean R
New York Times	Lean R
Rasmussen Reports	Likely R
Research 2000	Solid R
Washington Post	Likely R
Washington Times	Solid R
Zogby International	Likely R
Washington Dispatch	Likely R

=== Polling ===
Bush won every single pre-election poll. The final 3 poll average showed Bush leading 50% to 45%.

=== Fundraising ===
Bush raised $8,594,386. Kerry raised $6,125,128.

=== Advertising and visits ===
Neither campaign advertised or visited this state during the fall election.

== Analysis ==
For about 80 years after the Civil War, Virginia was, like most other former Confederate states, reliably Democratic at the presidential level. After the passage of civil rights legislation in the mid-1960s, Virginia turned strongly Republican at the presidential level, being the only former Confederate state to vote for Gerald Ford over Jimmy Carter in 1976. Much of the Republican strength in the state was based in the large and growing Richmond- and Washington, D.C.-area suburbs of Henrico, Chesterfield, and Fairfax Counties. This trend would start to change in the 2000s; although Bush was widely expected to carry Virginia and did prevail in the state by over 8 points, this election set the stage for the state to become more competitive on the presidential level in the future.

Though the state was uncontested by both campaigns, John Kerry became the first Democrat since Lyndon B. Johnson in 1964 to carry Fairfax County, long a key Republican stronghold and the most populous county in the state. He was also the first Democrat since Harry S. Truman in 1948 to carry the independent city of Danville and Albermarle County. However, Bush managed to keep the margin in Virginia roughly unchanged with respect to 2000 by making further inroads in rural Virginia, particularly in Southwest Virginia, a heavily unionized region that had traditionally been one of the Democratic strongholds in the state. Bush became the first Republican to carry Russell County since 1972 and expanded his margin by over 10 points in Washington, Scott, Wise, Lee, and Smyth Counties. These countervailing trends would continue in subsequent elections, with Democrats expanding their support in Fairfax County while Republicans showed increasing support in Appalachian Virginia.

== Results ==
2004 United States presidential election in Virginia
Party	Candidate	Running mate	Votes	Percentage	Electoral votes
Republican	George W. Bush (inc.)	Dick Cheney (incumbent)	1,716,959	53.68%	13
Democratic	John Kerry	John Edwards	1,454,742	45.48%	0
Libertarian	Michael Badnarik	Richard Campagna	11,032	0.34%	0
Constitution	Michael Peroutka	Chuck Baldwin	10,161	0.32%	0
Independent (Write-in)	Ralph Nader (Write-in)	Peter Camejo	2,393	0.07%	0
Green (Write-in)	David Cobb (Write-in)	Pat LaMarche	104	<0.01%	0
Write-ins			2,976	0.09%	0
Totals			3,198,367	100.00%	13
Voter turnout (Voting age population)				57.2%	—

=== By city/county ===
County/city	George W. Bush Republican		John Kerry Democratic		Other candidates Various parties		Margin		Total votes cast
County/city	#	%	#	%	#	%	#	%	Total votes cast
Accomack	7,726	57.85%	5,518	41.31%	112	0.84%	2,208	16.54%	13,356
Albemarle	21,189	48.46%	22,088	50.51%	449	1.03%	-899	-2.05%	43,726
Alexandria	19,844	32.26%	41,116	66.84%	555	0.90%	-21,272	-34.58%	61,515
Alleghany	3,962	55.07%	3,203	44.52%	30	0.42%	759	10.55%	7,195
Amelia	3,499	64.83%	1,862	34.50%	36	0.67%	1,637	30.33%	5,397
Amherst	7,758	61.11%	4,866	38.33%	71	0.56%	2,892	22.78%	12,695
Appomattox	4,366	65.60%	2,191	32.92%	98	1.47%	2,175	32.68%	6,655
Arlington	29,635	31.31%	63,987	67.60%	1,028	1.09%	-34,352	-36.29%	94,650
Augusta	22,100	74.40%	7,019	23.63%	585	1.97%	15,081	50.77%	29,704
Bath	1,432	62.75%	828	36.28%	22	0.96%	604	26.47%	2,282
Bedford	21,925	69.82%	9,102	28.98%	377	1.20%	12,823	40.84%	31,404
Bedford City	1,472	57.91%	1,042	40.99%	28	1.10%	430	16.92%	2,542
Bland	1,962	68.48%	846	29.53%	57	1.99%	1,116	38.95%	2,865
Botetourt	10,865	68.78%	4,801	30.39%	131	0.83%	6,064	38.39%	15,797
Bristol	4,275	63.58%	2,400	35.69%	49	0.73%	1,875	27.89%	6,724
Brunswick	2,852	41.18%	4,062	58.65%	12	0.17%	-1,210	-17.47%	6,926
Buchanan	4,507	45.85%	5,275	53.67%	47	0.48%	-768	-7.82%	9,829
Buckingham	3,185	52.85%	2,789	46.28%	53	0.88%	396	6.57%	6,027
Buena Vista	1,417	59.31%	936	39.18%	36	1.51%	481	20.13%	2,389
Campbell	15,891	69.10%	6,862	29.84%	244	1.06%	9,029	39.26%	22,997
Caroline	4,999	50.22%	4,878	49.01%	77	0.77%	121	1.21%	9,954
Carroll	8,173	67.39%	3,888	32.06%	67	0.55%	4,285	35.33%	12,128
Charles City	1,254	36.46%	2,155	62.66%	30	0.87%	-901	-26.20%	3,439
Charlotte	3,166	58.22%	2,223	40.88%	49	0.90%	943	17.34%	5,438
Charlottesville	4,172	27.00%	11,088	71.77%	190	1.23%	-6,916	-44.77%	15,450
Chesapeake	52,283	57.11%	38,744	42.32%	514	0.56%	13,539	14.79%	91,541
Chesterfield	83,745	62.58%	49,346	36.88%	723	0.54%	34,399	25.70%	133,814
Clarke	3,741	57.51%	2,699	41.49%	65	1.00%	1,042	16.02%	6,505
Colonial Heights	6,129	74.46%	2,061	25.04%	41	0.50%	4,068	49.42%	8,231
Covington	1,104	47.98%	1,179	51.24%	18	0.78%	-75	-3.26%	2,301
Craig	1,706	65.09%	901	34.38%	14	0.53%	805	30.71%	2,621
Culpeper	10,026	64.25%	5,476	35.09%	103	0.66%	4,550	29.16%	15,605
Cumberland	2,377	57.61%	1,721	41.71%	28	0.68%	656	15.90%	4,126
Danville	9,399	49.18%	9,436	49.37%	277	1.45%	-37	-0.19%	19,112
Dickenson	3,591	48.49%	3,761	50.78%	54	0.73%	-170	-2.29%	7,406
Dinwiddie	6,193	57.14%	4,569	42.15%	77	0.71%	1,624	14.99%	10,839
Emporia	970	43.67%	1,247	56.15%	4	0.18%	-277	-12.48%	2,221
Essex	2,304	53.04%	2,007	46.20%	33	0.76%	297	6.84%	4,344
Fairfax	211,980	45.94%	245,671	53.25%	3,728	0.81%	-33,691	-7.31%	461,379
Fairfax City	5,045	47.84%	5,395	51.16%	106	1.01%	-350	-3.32%	10,546
Falls Church	2,074	34.01%	3,944	64.68%	80	1.31%	-1,870	-30.67%	6,098
Fauquier	19,011	63.55%	10,712	35.81%	192	0.64%	8,299	27.74%	29,915
Floyd	4,162	61.81%	2,488	36.95%	84	1.25%	1,674	24.86%	6,734
Fluvanna	6,458	58.94%	4,415	40.29%	84	0.77%	2,043	18.65%	10,957
Franklin	14,048	63.21%	8,002	36.01%	173	0.78%	6,046	27.20%	22,223
Franklin City	1,613	45.62%	1,910	54.02%	13	0.37%	-297	-8.40%	3,536
Frederick	19,386	67.93%	8,853	31.02%	301	1.05%	10,533	36.91%	28,540
Fredericksburg	3,390	44.95%	4,085	54.16%	67	0.89%	-695	-9.21%	7,542
Galax	1,336	57.22%	987	42.27%	12	0.51%	349	14.95%	2,335
Giles	4,320	57.62%	3,047	40.64%	131	1.75%	1,273	16.98%	7,498
Gloucester	11,084	67.86%	5,105	31.26%	144	0.88%	5,979	36.60%	16,333
Goochland	6,668	64.50%	3,583	34.66%	87	0.84%	3,085	29.84%	10,338
Grayson	4,655	65.22%	2,430	34.05%	52	0.73%	2,225	31.17%	7,137
Greene	4,570	65.86%	2,240	32.28%	129	1.86%	2,330	33.58%	6,939
Greensville	1,732	40.68%	2,514	59.04%	12	0.28%	-782	-18.36%	4,258
Halifax	8,363	57.06%	6,220	42.44%	73	0.50%	2,143	14.62%	14,656
Hampton	23,399	41.98%	32,016	57.44%	326	0.58%	-8,617	-15.46%	55,741
Hanover	35,404	71.36%	13,941	28.10%	266	0.54%	21,463	43.26%	49,611
Harrisonburg	6,165	55.89%	4,726	42.85%	139	1.26%	1,439	13.04%	11,030
Henrico	71,809	53.82%	60,864	45.62%	745	0.56%	10,945	8.20%	133,418
Henry	13,358	56.94%	9,851	41.99%	249	1.06%	3,507	14.95%	23,458
Highland	982	64.61%	522	34.34%	16	1.05%	460	30.27%	1,520
Hopewell	4,251	53.57%	3,573	45.02%	112	1.41%	678	8.55%	7,936
Isle of Wight	9,929	62.56%	5,871	36.99%	71	0.45%	4,058	25.57%	15,871
James City	18,949	60.95%	11,934	38.39%	207	0.67%	7,015	22.56%	31,090
King and Queen	1,737	52.86%	1,506	45.83%	43	1.31%	231	7.03%	3,286
King George	5,124	64.69%	2,739	34.58%	58	0.73%	2,385	30.11%	7,921
King William	4,397	63.98%	2,436	35.45%	39	0.57%	1,961	28.53%	6,872
Lancaster	3,724	59.78%	2,477	39.76%	29	0.47%	1,247	20.02%	6,230
Lee	5,664	57.97%	4,005	40.99%	101	1.03%	1,659	16.98%	9,770
Lexington	982	41.81%	1,340	57.05%	27	1.15%	-358	-15.24%	2,349
Loudoun	60,382	55.69%	47,271	43.60%	777	0.72%	13,111	12.09%	108,430
Louisa	7,083	58.85%	4,844	40.25%	108	0.90%	2,239	18.60%	12,035
Lunenburg	2,858	54.49%	2,362	45.03%	25	0.48%	496	9.46%	5,245
Lynchburg	14,400	54.67%	11,727	44.52%	213	0.81%	2,673	10.15%	26,340
Madison	3,556	61.61%	2,176	37.70%	40	0.69%	1,380	23.91%	5,772
Manassas	7,257	56.24%	5,562	43.11%	84	0.65%	1,695	13.13%	12,903
Manassas Park	1,807	54.23%	1,498	44.96%	27	0.81%	309	9.27%	3,332
Martinsville	2,538	45.30%	3,036	54.19%	29	0.52%	-498	-8.89%	5,603
Mathews	3,497	68.18%	1,589	30.98%	43	0.84%	1,908	37.20%	5,129
Mecklenburg	7,319	57.27%	5,293	41.42%	168	1.31%	2,026	15.85%	12,780
Middlesex	3,336	62.04%	1,914	35.60%	127	2.36%	1,422	26.44%	5,377
Montgomery	17,070	54.16%	14,128	44.83%	317	1.01%	2,942	9.33%	31,515
Nelson	3,539	49.57%	3,543	49.63%	57	0.80%	-4	-0.06%	7,139
New Kent	5,414	68.13%	2,443	30.75%	89	1.12%	2,971	37.38%	7,946
Newport News	32,208	47.40%	35,319	51.98%	425	0.63%	-3,111	-4.58%	67,952
Norfolk	26,401	37.41%	43,518	61.67%	651	0.92%	-17,117	-24.26%	70,570
Northampton	2,669	48.54%	2,775	50.46%	55	1.00%	-106	-1.92%	5,499
Northumberland	3,832	59.79%	2,548	39.76%	29	0.45%	1,284	20.03%	6,409
Norton	768	51.06%	725	48.20%	11	0.73%	43	2.86%	1,504
Nottoway	3,303	54.78%	2,635	43.70%	92	1.53%	668	11.08%	6,030
Orange	7,749	59.94%	5,015	38.79%	164	1.27%	2,734	21.15%	12,928
Page	6,221	64.78%	3,324	34.61%	58	0.60%	2,897	30.17%	9,603
Patrick	5,507	67.04%	2,572	31.31%	136	1.66%	2,935	35.73%	8,215
Petersburg	2,238	18.73%	9,682	81.03%	29	0.24%	-7,444	-62.30%	11,949
Pittsylvania	17,673	64.46%	9,274	33.83%	470	1.71%	8,399	30.63%	27,417
Poquoson	5,004	77.22%	1,424	21.98%	52	0.80%	3,580	55.24%	6,480
Portsmouth	15,212	38.48%	24,112	60.99%	210	0.53%	-8,900	-22.51%	39,534
Powhatan	8,955	73.62%	3,112	25.59%	96	0.79%	5,843	48.03%	12,163
Prince Edward	3,571	48.81%	3,632	49.64%	113	1.54%	-61	-0.83%	7,316
Prince George	8,131	61.35%	5,066	38.22%	57	0.43%	3,065	23.13%	13,254
Prince William	69,776	52.84%	61,271	46.40%	1,016	0.77%	8,505	6.44%	132,063
Pulaski	8,769	61.53%	5,310	37.26%	172	1.21%	3,459	24.27%	14,251
Radford	2,564	52.92%	2,244	46.32%	37	0.76%	320	6.60%	4,845
Rappahannock	2,172	53.63%	1,837	45.36%	41	1.01%	335	8.27%	4,050
Richmond	2,082	61.95%	1,243	36.98%	36	1.07%	839	24.97%	3,361
Richmond City	21,637	29.11%	52,167	70.19%	521	0.70%	-30,530	-41.08%	74,325
Roanoke	30,596	65.14%	16,082	34.24%	295	0.63%	14,514	30.90%	46,973
Roanoke City	16,661	46.28%	18,862	52.39%	477	1.33%	-2,201	-6.11%	36,000
Rockbridge	5,412	58.95%	3,627	39.51%	142	1.55%	1,785	19.44%	9,181
Rockingham	21,737	74.40%	7,273	24.89%	206	0.71%	14,464	49.51%	29,216
Russell	6,077	53.20%	5,167	45.23%	179	1.57%	910	7.97%	11,423
Salem	7,115	61.96%	4,254	37.04%	115	1.00%	2,861	24.92%	11,484
Scott	6,479	65.00%	3,324	33.35%	164	1.65%	3,155	31.65%	9,967
Shenandoah	11,820	68.94%	5,186	30.25%	140	0.82%	6,634	38.69%	17,146
Smyth	7,906	64.18%	4,143	33.63%	270	2.19%	3,763	30.55%	12,319
Southampton	4,018	53.63%	3,431	45.80%	43	0.57%	587	7.83%	7,492
Spotsylvania	28,527	62.77%	16,623	36.58%	295	0.65%	11,904	26.19%	45,445
Stafford	28,500	61.98%	17,208	37.42%	278	0.60%	11,292	24.56%	45,986
Staunton	5,805	60.29%	3,756	39.01%	68	0.71%	2,049	21.28%	9,629
Suffolk	16,763	52.08%	15,233	47.32%	193	0.60%	1,530	4.76%	32,189
Surry	1,543	43.81%	1,954	55.48%	25	0.71%	-411	-11.67%	3,522
Sussex	1,890	43.50%	2,420	55.70%	35	0.81%	-530	-12.20%	4,345
Tazewell	10,039	57.43%	7,184	41.10%	257	1.47%	2,855	16.33%	17,480
Virginia Beach	103,752	59.06%	70,666	40.22%	1,269	0.72%	33,086	18.84%	175,687
Warren	8,600	61.13%	5,241	37.25%	227	1.61%	3,359	23.88%	14,068
Washington	14,749	65.51%	7,339	32.60%	426	1.89%	7,410	32.91%	22,514
Waynesboro	5,092	63.95%	2,792	35.06%	79	0.99%	2,300	28.89%	7,963
Westmoreland	3,433	50.13%	3,370	49.21%	45	0.66%	63	0.92%	6,848
Williamsburg	2,064	47.78%	2,216	51.30%	40	0.93%	-152	-3.52%	4,320
Winchester	5,283	56.55%	3,967	42.46%	93	1.00%	1,316	14.09%	9,343
Wise	8,330	58.20%	5,802	40.54%	180	1.26%	2,528	17.66%	14,312
Wythe	7,911	68.47%	3,581	30.99%	62	0.54%	4,330	37.48%	11,554
York	19,396	64.91%	10,276	34.39%	208	0.70%	9,120	30.52%	29,880
Totals	1,716,959	53.68%	1,454,742	45.48%	26,666	0.84%	262,217	8.20%	3,198,367

==== Counties and independent cities that flipped from Democratic to Republican ====
- Caroline (largest municipality: Bowling Green)
- Russell (largest municipality: Lebanon)
- Southampton (largest municipality: Courtland)
- Norton (independent city)
- Suffolk (independent city)

==== Counties and independent cities that flipped from Republican to Democratic ====
- Albemarle (largest municipality: Scottsville)
- Fairfax (largest municipality: Herndon)
- Nelson (largest municipality: Nellysford)
- Prince Edward (largest municipality: Farmville)
- Danville (independent city)
- Fairfax (independent city)
- Williamsburg (independent city)

=== By congressional district ===
Bush won nine of 11 congressional districts, including one that elected a Democrat.

District	Bush	Kerry	Representative
1st	60%	39%	Jo Ann Davis
2nd	58%	42%	Thelma Drake
3rd	33%	66%	Bobby Scott
4th	57%	43%	Randy Forbes
5th	56%	43%	Virgil Goode
6th	63%	36%	Bob Goodlatte
7th	61%	38%	Eric Cantor
8th	35%	64%	Jim Moran
9th	59%	39%	Rick Boucher
10th	55%	44%	Frank Wolf
11th	50%	49%	Tom Davis

== Electors ==
Technically the voters of Virginia cast their ballots for electors: representatives to the Electoral College. Virginia is allocated 13 electors because it has 11 congressional districts and 2 senators. All candidates who appear on the ballot or qualify to receive write-in votes must submit a list of 13 electors, who pledge to vote for their candidate and his or her running mate. Whoever wins the majority of votes in the state is awarded all 13 electoral votes. Their chosen electors then vote for president and vice president. Although electors are pledged to their candidate and running mate, they are not obligated to vote for them. An elector who votes for someone other than his or her candidate is known as a faithless elector.

The electors of each state and the District of Columbia met on December 13, 2004, to cast their votes for president and vice president. The Electoral College itself never meets as one body. Instead the electors from each state and the District of Columbia met in their respective capitols.

The following were the members of the Electoral College from the state. All 13 were pledged for Bush/Cheney:

1. Yvonne McGee McCoy
2. Loretta H. Tate
3. Theodore C. Brown
4. Woodrow Harris
5. Keith C. Drake
6. Wendell S. Walker
7. Peter E. Broadbent
8. Sean Michael Spicer
9. Lloyd C. Martin
10. Dorothy L. Simpson
11. Carlton John Davis
12. Charles E. Dane
13. Rebecca Anne Stoeckel
