= 1976 United States presidential election in Virginia =

- November 2, 1976
- Turnout: 80.8%

Nominee	Gerald Ford	Jimmy Carter
Party	Republican	Democratic
Home state	Michigan	Georgia
Running mate	Bob Dole	Walter Mondale
Electoral vote	12	0
Popular vote	836,554	813,896
Percentage	49.29%	47.96%
County and independent city results
Ford
40–50%
50–60%
60–70%
Carter
40–50%
50–60%
60–70%
70–80%
President before election
Gerald Ford
Republican
Elected President
Jimmy Carter
Democratic

The 1976 United States presidential election in Virginia took place on November 2, 1976. All 50 states and the District of Columbia were part of the 1976 United States presidential election. Virginia voters chose twelve electors to the Electoral College, which selected the president and vice president of the United States.

Virginia had voted Republican at all but one of the previous six presidential elections, largely due to its large white Washington and Richmond suburbs that received large-scale in-migration from the Northeast, alongside the Shenandoah Valley, being amongst the first traditionally Democratic areas of the former Confederacy to turn Republican at both the presidential level and in federal congressional elections. After the collapse of the Byrd Organization and the expansion of the state's formerly small electorate via the Voting Rights Act, these trends intensified except in the heavily unionised coalfields of Southwest Virginia, where unlike elsewhere in the Confederacy, many newly registered poor whites voted Democratic. The statewide Democratic party was severely divided into conservative, moderate and liberal factions, so that in addition to voting Republican in five of six presidential elections, Virginia's Congressional delegation would gain a Republican majority as early as the 91st Congress, although it was 1970 before significant GOP gains occurred in the state legislature.

It was generally acknowledged that President Nixon offered no support to down-ballot Republican candidates, but the division in the state Democrats was so bad that they did not nominate a candidate for governor in 1973 — with most of the party supporting populist Henry Howell. However, the Democrats did regain a dozen seats in the state legislature in 1975.

Carter did do relatively well in many rural sections of Virginia – for instance he is the solitary Democratic presidential nominee to top forty percent in traditionally arch-Republican Floyd County since Grover Cleveland in 1892. As of the 2024 presidential election, this is the last occasion a Democratic presidential nominee has carried Amelia County, Bedford County, Botetourt County, Charlotte County, Cumberland County, Fluvanna County, Gloucester County, Goochland County, Grayson County, Halifax County, King George County, New Kent County, Nottoway County, Patrick County, Prince George County, Rappahannock County, Rockbridge County, Scott County, Spotsylvania County, Warren County, Bristol City and Salem City, while Stafford County would not vote for the Democratic nominee again until 2020.

== Campaign ==
During the fall campaign, Virginia was the scene of debates between Carter and Ford in the third week of October. They would have their final debate of the whole campaign at the College of William and Mary. The debate was moderated by Barbara Walters from ABC News and was sponsored by the League of Women Voters.

Among white voters, 56% supported Ford while 40% supported Carter. Virginia was the only southern state to support Ford.

=== Predictions ===
Source	Ranking	As of
Simpson's Leader-Times	Tossup	October 16, 1976
The Sentinel	Tossup	October 18, 1976
Daily Press	Lean R	October 24, 1976
Kansas City Times	Lean R	October 24, 1976
Daily News	Likely R	October 27, 1976
Austin American-Statesman	Tossup	October 31, 1976
New York Times	Lean R	November 1, 1976

== Results ==
1976 United States presidential election in Virginia
Party	Candidate	Votes	Percentage	Electoral votes
Republican	Gerald Ford (inc.)	836,554	49.29%	12
Democratic	Jimmy Carter	813,896	47.96%	0
Socialist Workers	Peter Camejo	17,802	1.05%	0
American	Thomas J. Anderson	16,686	0.98%	0
U.S. Labor	Lyndon LaRouche	7,508	0.44%	0
Libertarian	Roger MacBride	4,648	0.27%	0
Totals		1,697,094	100.00%	12

=== Results by county or independent city ===
County or city	Gerald Ford Republican		Jimmy Carter Democratic		Peter Camejo Socialist Workers		Thomas Anderson American		Lyndon LaRouche U.S. Labor		Roger MacBride Libertarian		Margin		Total votes cast
County or city	#	%	#	%	#	%	#	%	#	%	#	%	#	%	Total votes cast
Accomack	4,494	47.13%	4,807	50.41%	87	0.91%	90	0.94%	40	0.42%	18	0.19%	-313	-3.28%	9,536
Albemarle	9,084	54.62%	7,310	43.95%	22	0.13%	58	0.35%	49	0.29%	109	0.66%	1,774	10.67%	16,632
Alexandria	16,880	44.53%	19,858	52.38%	568	1.50%	371	0.98%	109	0.29%	124	0.33%	-2,978	-7.85%	37,910
Alleghany	1,756	41.17%	2,462	57.73%	14	0.33%	19	0.45%	9	0.21%	5	0.12%	-706	-16.56%	4,265
Amelia	1,634	47.25%	1,715	49.60%	9	0.26%	56	1.62%	36	1.04%	8	0.23%	-81	-2.35%	3,458
Amherst	3,956	50.87%	3,675	47.26%	23	0.30%	44	0.57%	49	0.63%	29	0.37%	281	3.61%	7,776
Appomattox	1,964	50.84%	1,702	44.06%	79	2.05%	80	2.07%	29	0.75%	9	0.23%	262	6.78%	3,863
Arlington	30,972	47.95%	32,536	50.37%	353	0.55%	387	0.60%	121	0.19%	230	0.36%	-1,564	-2.42%	64,599
Augusta	8,452	57.53%	5,626	38.29%	207	1.41%	315	2.14%	59	0.40%	33	0.22%	2,826	19.24%	14,692
Bath	888	45.96%	1,029	53.26%	2	0.10%	8	0.41%	3	0.16%	2	0.10%	-141	-7.30%	1,932
Bedford	4,189	45.31%	4,766	51.55%	121	1.31%	135	1.46%	24	0.26%	11	0.12%	-577	-6.24%	9,246
Bedford City	1,043	45.47%	1,122	48.91%	67	2.92%	51	2.22%	6	0.26%	5	0.22%	-79	-3.44%	2,294
Bland	1,047	51.91%	961	47.65%	1	0.05%	5	0.25%	2	0.10%	1	0.05%	86	4.26%	2,017
Botetourt	3,343	44.14%	4,021	53.10%	83	1.10%	70	0.92%	38	0.50%	18	0.24%	-678	-8.96%	7,573
Bristol	2,943	46.27%	3,343	52.55%	10	0.16%	23	0.36%	25	0.39%	17	0.27%	-400	-6.28%	6,361
Brunswick	2,387	42.11%	3,071	54.18%	56	0.99%	41	0.72%	59	1.04%	54	0.95%	-684	-12.07%	5,668
Buchanan	3,850	35.89%	5,791	53.98%	592	5.52%	367	3.42%	104	0.97%	24	0.22%	-1,941	-18.09%	10,728
Buckingham	1,487	39.57%	2,179	57.98%	20	0.53%	27	0.72%	30	0.80%	15	0.40%	-692	-18.41%	3,758
Buena Vista	771	41.61%	993	53.59%	61	3.22%	53	2.80%	13	0.69%	3	0.16%	-222	-11.98%	1,853
Campbell	7,442	60.78%	4,354	35.56%	156	1.27%	199	1.63%	65	0.53%	29	0.24%	3,088	25.22%	12,245
Caroline	1,648	34.36%	3,064	63.89%	23	0.48%	21	0.44%	27	0.56%	13	0.27%	-1,416	-29.53%	4,796
Carroll	4,820	53.75%	4,010	44.71%	15	0.17%	48	0.54%	58	0.65%	17	0.19%	810	9.04%	8,968
Charles City	439	22.50%	1,455	74.58%	18	0.92%	12	0.62%	19	0.97%	8	0.41%	-1,016	-52.08%	1,951
Charlotte	2,023	46.04%	2,312	52.62%	12	0.27%	34	0.77%	10	0.23%	3	0.07%	-289	-6.58%	4,394
Charlottesville	6,673	48.11%	6,846	49.36%	110	0.79%	105	0.76%	54	0.39%	81	0.58%	-173	-1.25%	13,869
Chesapeake	12,851	39.96%	17,651	54.89%	870	2.71%	576	1.79%	143	0.44%	66	0.21%	-4,800	-14.93%	32,157
Chesterfield	27,812	65.54%	14,126	33.29%	67	0.16%	168	0.40%	153	0.36%	110	0.26%	13,686	32.25%	42,436
Clarke	1,440	51.54%	1,276	45.67%	14	0.50%	19	0.68%	34	1.22%	11	0.39%	164	5.87%	2,794
Clifton Forge	770	40.68%	993	52.46%	61	3.22%	53	2.80%	13	0.69%	3	0.16%	-223	-11.78%	1,893
Colonial Heights	4,291	61.88%	2,409	34.74%	46	0.66%	133	1.92%	39	0.56%	16	0.23%	1,882	27.14%	6,934
Covington	1,173	37.06%	1,820	57.50%	103	3.25%	47	1.48%	18	0.57%	4	0.13%	-647	-20.44%	3,165
Craig	546	32.75%	1,103	66.17%	11	0.66%	1	0.06%	6	0.36%	0	0.00%	-557	-33.42%	1,667
Culpeper	3,659	54.64%	2,892	43.19%	46	0.69%	56	0.84%	22	0.33%	21	0.31%	767	11.45%	6,696
Cumberland	1,284	46.57%	1,302	47.23%	78	2.83%	55	1.99%	16	0.58%	22	0.80%	-18	-0.66%	2,757
Danville	10,235	59.46%	6,425	37.33%	198	1.15%	231	1.34%	95	0.55%	28	0.16%	3,810	22.13%	17,212
Dickenson	3,471	42.28%	4,583	55.83%	21	0.26%	51	0.62%	73	0.89%	10	0.12%	-1,112	-13.55%	8,209
Dinwiddie	2,413	37.28%	3,873	59.83%	52	0.80%	32	0.49%	76	1.17%	27	0.42%	-1,460	-22.55%	6,473
Emporia	1,055	52.23%	899	44.50%	13	0.64%	13	0.64%	30	1.49%	10	0.50%	156	7.73%	2,020
Essex	1,380	50.55%	1,306	47.84%	10	0.37%	19	0.70%	12	0.44%	3	0.11%	74	2.71%	2,730
Fairfax	110,424	53.62%	92,037	44.69%	1,269	0.62%	1,258	0.61%	323	0.16%	646	0.31%	18,387	8.93%	205,957
Fairfax City	4,174	53.36%	3,464	44.28%	68	0.87%	84	1.07%	9	0.12%	24	0.31%	710	9.08%	7,823
Falls Church	2,323	50.63%	2,202	47.99%	9	0.20%	27	0.59%	9	0.20%	18	0.39%	121	2.64%	4,588
Fauquier	4,715	51.75%	4,002	43.92%	179	1.96%	162	1.78%	31	0.34%	22	0.24%	713	7.83%	9,111
Floyd	2,071	52.76%	1,728	44.03%	22	0.56%	44	1.12%	47	1.20%	13	0.33%	343	8.73%	3,925
Fluvanna	1,296	46.79%	1,415	51.08%	11	0.40%	10	0.36%	23	0.83%	15	0.54%	-119	-4.29%	2,770
Franklin	3,532	34.63%	6,439	63.13%	66	0.65%	5	0.05%	70	0.69%	37	0.36%	-2,907	-28.50%	10,199
Franklin City	1,127	49.21%	1,116	48.73%	7	0.31%	10	0.44%	19	0.83%	11	0.48%	11	0.48%	2,290
Frederick	5,162	59.52%	3,389	39.08%	15	0.17%	54	0.62%	30	0.35%	22	0.25%	1,773	20.44%	8,672
Fredericksburg	2,527	49.07%	2,550	49.51%	10	0.19%	11	0.21%	33	0.64%	19	0.37%	-23	-0.44%	5,150
Galax	1,128	47.59%	1,218	51.39%	5	0.21%	8	0.34%	6	0.25%	5	0.21%	-90	-3.80%	2,370
Giles	2,731	40.53%	3,779	56.08%	81	1.20%	71	1.05%	55	0.82%	22	0.33%	-1,048	-15.55%	6,739
Gloucester	3,025	47.24%	3,156	49.28%	104	1.62%	61	0.95%	39	0.61%	19	0.30%	-131	-2.04%	6,404
Goochland	2,104	47.23%	2,259	50.71%	33	0.74%	20	0.45%	22	0.49%	17	0.38%	-155	-3.48%	4,455
Grayson	3,021	48.33%	3,146	50.33%	17	0.27%	5	0.08%	36	0.58%	6	0.10%	-125	-2.00%	6,251
Greene	1,095	51.41%	895	42.02%	55	2.58%	58	2.72%	13	0.61%	14	0.66%	200	9.39%	2,130
Greensville	1,137	31.18%	2,413	66.18%	25	0.69%	26	0.71%	36	0.99%	9	0.25%	-1,276	-35.00%	3,646
Halifax	4,045	46.51%	4,352	50.04%	108	1.24%	103	1.18%	70	0.80%	19	0.22%	-307	-3.53%	8,697
Hampton	15,021	41.67%	19,202	53.27%	1,033	2.85%	583	1.61%	117	0.32%	92	0.25%	-4,001	-11.60%	36,048
Hanover	11,559	64.72%	6,069	33.98%	25	0.14%	92	0.52%	77	0.43%	37	0.21%	5,490	30.74%	17,859
Harrisonburg	3,376	63.01%	1,803	33.65%	53	0.99%	86	1.61%	19	0.35%	21	0.39%	1,573	29.36%	5,358
Henrico	45,405	65.82%	21,729	31.50%	627	0.91%	909	1.32%	162	0.23%	149	0.22%	23,676	34.32%	68,981
Henry	5,612	35.02%	9,680	60.41%	379	2.37%	233	1.45%	95	0.59%	25	0.16%	-4,068	-25.39%	16,024
Highland	629	55.57%	493	43.55%	1	0.09%	7	0.62%	1	0.09%	1	0.09%	136	12.02%	1,132
Hopewell	3,764	48.21%	3,691	47.28%	179	2.29%	99	1.27%	53	0.68%	21	0.27%	73	0.93%	7,807
Isle of Wight	2,718	38.78%	4,145	59.14%	40	0.57%	40	0.57%	50	0.71%	16	0.23%	-1,427	-20.36%	7,009
James City	3,186	49.36%	3,000	46.48%	159	2.46%	67	1.04%	23	0.36%	19	0.29%	186	2.88%	6,454
King and Queen	778	39.06%	1,111	55.77%	27	1.36%	19	0.95%	39	1.96%	18	0.90%	-333	-16.71%	1,992
King George	1,383	46.75%	1,513	51.15%	9	0.30%	24	0.81%	16	0.54%	13	0.44%	-130	-4.40%	2,958
King William	1,597	50.60%	1,501	47.56%	6	0.19%	11	0.35%	22	0.70%	19	0.60%	96	3.04%	3,156
Lancaster	2,381	58.44%	1,581	38.81%	40	0.98%	40	0.98%	26	0.64%	6	0.15%	800	19.63%	4,074
Lee	4,679	45.50%	5,415	52.65%	34	0.33%	38	0.37%	97	0.94%	21	0.20%	-736	-7.15%	10,284
Lexington	1,027	50.47%	945	46.44%	32	1.57%	22	1.08%	4	0.20%	5	0.25%	82	4.03%	2,035
Loudoun	9,192	51.79%	7,995	45.05%	205	1.16%	262	1.48%	47	0.26%	47	0.26%	1,197	6.74%	17,748
Louisa	2,151	41.89%	2,857	55.64%	19	0.37%	21	0.41%	69	1.34%	18	0.35%	-706	-13.75%	5,135
Lunenburg	1,816	49.73%	1,739	47.62%	30	0.82%	54	1.48%	8	0.22%	5	0.14%	77	2.11%	3,652
Lynchburg	14,564	61.18%	8,227	34.56%	412	1.73%	455	1.91%	94	0.39%	52	0.22%	6,337	26.62%	23,804
Madison	1,710	52.97%	1,466	45.42%	19	0.59%	21	0.65%	6	0.19%	6	0.19%	264	7.55%	3,228
Manassas	1,992	53.30%	1,646	44.05%	50	1.34%	37	0.99%	5	0.13%	7	0.19%	346	9.25%	3,737
Manassas Park	444	37.34%	709	59.63%	7	0.59%	19	1.60%	10	0.84%	0	0.00%	-265	-22.29%	1,189
Martinsville	3,147	45.38%	3,491	50.34%	144	2.08%	101	1.46%	34	0.49%	18	0.26%	-344	-4.96%	6,935
Mathews	1,908	57.77%	1,309	39.63%	21	0.64%	31	0.94%	26	0.79%	8	0.24%	599	18.14%	3,303
Mecklenburg	4,423	50.44%	4,076	46.48%	77	0.88%	85	0.97%	78	0.89%	30	0.34%	347	3.96%	8,769
Middlesex	1,608	52.91%	1,312	43.17%	38	1.25%	50	1.65%	18	0.59%	13	0.43%	296	9.74%	3,039
Montgomery	7,971	50.64%	7,539	47.89%	43	0.27%	53	0.34%	64	0.41%	72	0.46%	432	2.75%	15,742
Nelson	1,516	37.65%	2,426	60.24%	12	0.30%	20	0.50%	34	0.84%	19	0.47%	-910	-22.59%	4,027
New Kent	1,259	47.62%	1,338	50.61%	9	0.34%	14	0.53%	17	0.64%	7	0.26%	-79	-2.99%	2,644
Newport News	20,914	47.01%	23,058	51.83%	76	0.17%	173	0.39%	186	0.42%	85	0.19%	-2,144	-4.82%	44,492
Norfolk	28,099	39.91%	39,295	55.82%	1,543	2.19%	986	1.40%	308	0.44%	171	0.24%	-11,196	-15.91%	70,402
Northampton	2,043	43.15%	2,459	51.93%	116	2.45%	67	1.41%	31	0.65%	19	0.40%	-416	-8.78%	4,735
Northumberland	2,167	52.52%	1,814	43.97%	59	1.43%	41	0.99%	32	0.78%	13	0.32%	353	8.55%	4,126
Norton	577	40.35%	811	56.71%	17	1.19%	14	0.98%	6	0.42%	5	0.35%	-234	-16.36%	1,430
Nottoway	2,486	47.61%	2,558	48.99%	77	1.47%	62	1.19%	29	0.56%	10	0.19%	-72	-1.38%	5,222
Orange	2,549	49.39%	2,309	44.74%	127	2.46%	100	1.94%	49	0.95%	27	0.52%	240	4.65%	5,161
Page	3,780	51.52%	3,401	46.35%	29	0.40%	49	0.67%	47	0.64%	31	0.42%	379	5.17%	7,337
Patrick	2,349	43.69%	2,740	50.96%	104	1.93%	131	2.44%	47	0.87%	6	0.11%	-391	-7.27%	5,377
Petersburg	5,041	38.53%	7,852	60.02%	31	0.24%	59	0.45%	70	0.54%	29	0.22%	-2,811	-21.49%	13,082
Pittsylvania	9,173	51.21%	7,929	44.26%	333	1.86%	315	1.76%	129	0.72%	34	0.19%	1,244	6.95%	17,913
Poquoson	1,461	55.34%	1,140	43.18%	5	0.19%	14	0.53%	13	0.49%	7	0.27%	321	12.16%	2,640
Portsmouth	12,872	35.51%	22,837	63.01%	80	0.22%	169	0.47%	216	0.60%	72	0.20%	-9,965	-27.50%	36,246
Powhatan	2,010	55.28%	1,528	42.02%	9	0.25%	46	1.27%	31	0.85%	12	0.33%	482	13.26%	3,636
Prince Edward	2,734	50.36%	2,448	45.09%	86	1.58%	71	1.31%	62	1.14%	28	0.52%	286	5.27%	5,429
Prince George	2,254	45.44%	2,630	53.02%	19	0.38%	18	0.36%	27	0.54%	12	0.24%	-376	-7.58%	4,960
Prince William	15,446	49.00%	15,215	48.26%	323	1.02%	405	1.28%	54	0.17%	81	0.26%	231	0.74%	31,524
Pulaski	4,764	44.84%	5,546	52.20%	87	0.82%	106	1.00%	96	0.90%	25	0.24%	-782	-7.36%	10,624
Radford	1,844	44.74%	2,240	54.34%	12	0.29%	6	0.15%	14	0.34%	6	0.15%	-396	-9.60%	4,122
Rappahannock	881	44.47%	1,071	54.06%	8	0.40%	11	0.56%	5	0.25%	5	0.25%	-190	-9.59%	1,981
Richmond	1,391	60.80%	864	37.76%	8	0.35%	11	0.48%	11	0.48%	3	0.13%	527	23.04%	2,288
Richmond City	37,176	44.73%	44,687	53.77%	253	0.30%	255	0.31%	430	0.52%	309	0.37%	-7,511	-9.04%	83,110
Roanoke	13,587	50.42%	13,120	48.69%	25	0.09%	100	0.37%	57	0.21%	59	0.22%	467	1.73%	26,948
Roanoke City	14,738	41.00%	20,696	57.57%	141	0.39%	162	0.45%	137	0.38%	75	0.21%	-5,958	-16.57%	35,949
Rockbridge	2,157	43.66%	2,525	51.11%	116	2.35%	100	2.02%	31	0.63%	11	0.22%	-368	-7.45%	4,940
Rockingham	9,768	61.87%	5,349	33.88%	195	1.24%	344	2.18%	77	0.49%	56	0.35%	4,419	27.99%	15,789
Russell	4,287	40.19%	6,014	56.38%	185	1.73%	124	1.16%	48	0.45%	9	0.08%	-1,727	-16.19%	10,667
Salem	4,196	48.29%	4,404	50.68%	11	0.13%	47	0.54%	19	0.22%	13	0.15%	-208	-2.39%	8,690
Scott	4,313	45.43%	4,496	47.36%	319	3.36%	279	2.94%	74	0.78%	13	0.14%	-183	-1.93%	9,494
Shenandoah	6,296	64.05%	3,364	34.22%	27	0.27%	62	0.63%	54	0.55%	27	0.27%	2,932	29.83%	9,830
Smyth	5,032	47.29%	5,246	49.30%	144	1.35%	164	1.54%	39	0.37%	16	0.15%	-214	-2.01%	10,641
South Boston	1,389	56.97%	1,001	41.06%	4	0.16%	10	0.41%	22	0.90%	12	0.49%	388	15.91%	2,438
Southampton	2,366	40.18%	3,399	57.72%	17	0.29%	33	0.56%	61	1.04%	13	0.22%	-1,033	-17.54%	5,889
Spotsylvania	3,210	42.46%	4,210	55.69%	16	0.21%	38	0.50%	73	0.97%	13	0.17%	-1,000	-13.23%	7,560
Stafford	4,451	46.84%	4,900	51.57%	19	0.20%	54	0.57%	55	0.58%	23	0.24%	-449	-4.73%	9,502
Staunton	4,681	59.53%	2,951	37.53%	89	1.13%	95	1.21%	28	0.36%	19	0.24%	1,730	22.00%	7,863
Suffolk	6,066	38.86%	9,246	59.24%	49	0.31%	68	0.44%	147	0.94%	33	0.21%	-3,180	-20.38%	15,609
Surry	929	32.79%	1,829	64.56%	26	0.92%	14	0.49%	19	0.67%	16	0.56%	-900	-31.77%	2,833
Sussex	1,360	33.22%	2,497	60.99%	112	2.74%	73	1.78%	45	1.10%	7	0.17%	-1,137	-27.77%	4,094
Tazewell	5,565	41.41%	7,565	56.29%	94	0.70%	105	0.78%	92	0.68%	18	0.13%	-2,000	-14.88%	13,439
Virginia Beach	34,593	54.46%	25,824	40.66%	1,607	2.53%	1,143	1.80%	175	0.28%	176	0.28%	8,769	13.80%	63,518
Warren	2,985	45.80%	3,221	49.42%	139	2.13%	109	1.67%	45	0.69%	18	0.28%	-236	-3.62%	6,517
Washington	6,865	48.98%	6,547	46.71%	287	2.05%	199	1.42%	95	0.68%	22	0.16%	318	2.27%	14,015
Waynesboro	3,528	59.64%	2,209	37.35%	75	1.27%	80	1.35%	14	0.24%	9	0.15%	1,319	22.29%	5,915
Westmoreland	1,909	41.79%	2,355	51.55%	152	3.33%	111	2.43%	32	0.70%	9	0.20%	-446	-9.76%	4,568
Williamsburg	1,654	51.77%	1,468	45.95%	20	0.63%	27	0.85%	7	0.22%	19	0.59%	186	5.82%	3,195
Winchester	4,075	62.85%	2,346	36.18%	9	0.14%	28	0.43%	17	0.26%	9	0.14%	1,729	26.67%	6,484
Wise	5,691	42.63%	7,134	53.43%	233	1.75%	181	1.36%	90	0.67%	22	0.16%	-1,443	-10.80%	13,351
Wythe	4,231	51.34%	3,578	43.42%	185	2.24%	159	1.93%	79	0.96%	9	0.11%	653	7.92%	8,241
York	5,603	53.61%	4,736	45.32%	16	0.15%	37	0.35%	33	0.32%	26	0.25%	867	8.29%	10,451
Totals	836,554	49.29%	813,896	47.96%	17,802	1.05%	16,686	0.98%	7,508	0.44%	4,648	0.27%	22,658	1.33%	1,697,094

==== Counties and independent cities that flipped from Republican to Democratic ====
- Arlington
- Accomack
- Amelia
- Alleghany
- Bath
- Bedford
- Botetourt
- Brunswick
- Buchanan
- Buckingham
- Caroline
- Charlotte
- Craig
- Cumberland
- Dickenson
- Diwiddie
- Fluvanna
- Franklin
- Giles
- Gloucester
- Goochland
- Grayson
- Greensville
- Halifax
- Henry
- Isle of Wight
- King and Queen
- King George
- Lee
- Louisa
- Nelson
- New Kent
- Northampton
- Nottoway
- Patrick
- Prince George
- Pulaski
- Rappahannock
- Rockbridge
- Russell
- Scott
- Smyth
- Southampton
- Spotsylvania
- Stafford
- Surry
- Sussex
- Tazewell
- Westmoreland
- Warren County
- Wise
- Alexandria
- Bristol
- Bedford
- Buena Vista
- Charlottesville
- Chesapeake
- Clifton Forge
- Covington
- Fredericksburg
- Galax
- Hampton
- Martinsville
- Newport News
- Norfolk
- Norton
- Petersburg
- Portsmouth
- Radford
- Richmond
- Roanoke
- Salem
- Suffolk

=== Results by congressional district ===
Ford won 6 of 10 congressional districts. Ford and Carter each won four districts won by the other party.

District	Ford	Carter	Representative
1st	47%	50%	Thomas N. Downing
1st	47%	50%	Paul Trible
2nd	47%	49%	G. William Whitehurst
3rd	56%	42%	David E. Satterfield III
4th	40%	57%	Robert Daniel
5th	51%	46%	Dan Daniel
6th	49%	48%	M. Caldwell Butler
7th	54%	44%	J. Kenneth Robinson
8th	51%	47%	Herbert Harris
9th	45%	51%	William C. Wampler Sr.
10th	51%	47%	Joseph L. Fisher

== Works cited ==
- Black, Earl; Black, Merle (1992). The Vital South: How Presidents Are Elected. Harvard University Press. ISBN 0674941306.
