= 1996 United States presidential election in Virginia =

- November 5, 1996
- Turnout: 72.7% ▼

Nominee	Bob Dole	Bill Clinton	Ross Perot
Party	Republican	Democratic	Reform
Home state	Kansas	Arkansas	Texas
Running mate	Jack Kemp	Al Gore	Patrick Choate
Electoral vote	13	0	0
Popular vote	1,138,350	1,091,060	159,861
Percentage	47.10%	45.15%	6.62%

Dole
40–50%
50–60%
60–70%
70–80%
80–90%
Clinton
40–50%
50–60%
60–70%
70–80%
80–90%
90–100%
Tie/no data
President before election
Bill Clinton
Democratic
Elected President
Bill Clinton
Democratic

The 1996 United States presidential election in Virginia took place on November 5, 1996, as part of the 1996 United States presidential election. Voters chose 13 representatives, or electors, to the Electoral College, who voted for president and vice president.

Virginia was won by Senator Bob Dole (R-KS), 47.10 percent to 45.15 percent over incumbent President Bill Clinton (D-AR), producing a margin of 1.95 percentage points. Billionaire businessman Ross Perot (Reform-TX) finished in third place, with 6.62% of the popular vote.

Virginia was also the only state that Bill Clinton lost twice but Hillary Clinton won, as she managed a 5 percentage point victory in the state in 2016. As of the 2024 presidential election, this was also the last time Bath, Allegheny, Giles, Smyth, Tazewell, Lee, Wise, Dinwiddie, Accomack Counties, and the independent cities of Galax and Buena Vista voted for a Democratic presidential candidate. The election was, however, the first time the Democratic presidential nominee had carried Prince Edward County – famous for its Civil Rights movement-era school desegregation cases – since Harry S. Truman in 1948, (Note: Prince Edward County did, at the height of "Massive Resistance" give a majority to "States' Rights" candidate T. Coleman Andrews in 1956.) and the first time since 1968 that Essex County had voted Democratic.

In this election, Virginia voted 10.47 points to the right of the nation at-large. Clinton was the first president elected to two terms in office without carrying Virginia either time since William McKinley in 1896 and 1900, (Note: This feat would be reprised by Donald Trump in 2016 and 2024.) and is to date the only Democratic presidential candidate to win the presidency without carrying the state at least once, as well as the most recent Democratic to win without the state. As of 2024, this also marked the last occasion Virginia would vote to the right of Georgia.

== Results ==
1996 United States presidential election in Virginia
Party	Candidate	Running mate	Votes	Percentage	Electoral votes
Republican	Bob Dole	Jack Kemp	1,138,350	47.10%	13
Democratic	Bill Clinton (inc.)	Al Gore (inc.)	1,091,060	45.15%	0
Reform	Ross Perot	Patrick Choate	159,861	6.62%	0
U.S. Taxpayers' Party	Howard Phillips	Albion W. Knight Jr.	13,687	0.57%	0
Libertarian	Harry Browne	Jo Jorgensen	9,174	0.38%	0
Natural Law	John Hagelin	Mike Tompkins	4,510	0.19%	0
Totals			2,416,642	100.00%	13

=== By city/county ===
County/city	Bob Dole Republican		Bill Clinton Democratic		Ross Perot Reform		Various candidates Other parties		Margin		Total votes cast
County/city	#	%	#	%	#	%	#	%	#	%	Total votes cast
Accomack	5,013	43.02%	5,220	44.79%	1,218	10.45%	203	1.74%	-207	-1.77%	11,654
Albemarle	15,243	48.81%	14,089	45.12%	1,533	4.91%	363	1.16%	1,154	3.69%	31,228
Alexandria	15,554	34.26%	27,968	61.60%	1,472	3.24%	405	0.89%	-12,414	-27.34%	45,399
Alleghany	2,015	39.71%	2,398	47.26%	607	11.96%	54	1.06%	-383	-7.55%	5,074
Amelia	2,119	51.13%	1,625	39.21%	323	7.79%	77	1.86%	494	11.92%	4,144
Amherst	5,094	46.63%	4,864	44.53%	835	7.64%	131	1.20%	230	2.10%	10,924
Appomattox	2,625	47.93%	2,239	40.88%	510	9.31%	103	1.88%	386	7.05%	5,477
Arlington	26,106	34.63%	45,573	60.46%	2,782	3.69%	915	1.21%	-19,467	-25.83%	75,376
Augusta	13,458	60.89%	5,965	26.99%	1,916	8.67%	763	3.45%	7,493	33.90%	22,102
Bath	847	41.30%	922	44.95%	247	12.04%	35	1.71%	-75	-3.65%	2,051
Bedford	11,955	54.07%	7,786	35.22%	1,976	8.94%	392	1.77%	4,169	18.85%	22,109
Bedford City	990	42.84%	1,065	46.08%	212	9.17%	44	1.90%	-75	-3.24%	2,311
Bland	1,167	46.00%	939	37.01%	385	15.18%	46	1.81%	228	8.99%	2,537
Botetourt	6,404	51.73%	4,576	36.96%	1,138	9.19%	262	2.12%	1,828	14.77%	12,380
Bristol	2,983	49.50%	2,586	42.91%	429	7.12%	28	0.46%	397	6.59%	6,026
Brunswick	2,059	34.79%	3,442	58.16%	340	5.75%	77	1.30%	-1,383	-23.37%	5,918
Buchanan	2,785	26.96%	6,551	63.40%	858	8.30%	138	1.34%	-3,766	-36.44%	10,332
Buckingham	1,974	40.70%	2,374	48.95%	392	8.08%	110	2.27%	-400	-8.25%	4,850
Buena Vista	713	34.66%	1,090	52.99%	216	10.50%	38	1.85%	-377	-18.33%	2,057
Campbell	10,273	54.35%	6,788	35.91%	1,505	7.96%	336	1.78%	3,485	18.44%	18,902
Caroline	2,816	38.65%	3,897	53.49%	521	7.15%	51	0.70%	-1,081	-14.84%	7,285
Carroll	5,088	51.04%	3,611	36.22%	1,158	11.62%	112	1.12%	1,477	14.82%	9,969
Charles City	729	26.16%	1,842	66.09%	178	6.39%	38	1.36%	-1,113	-39.93%	2,787
Charlotte	2,103	45.58%	2,007	43.50%	431	9.34%	73	1.58%	96	2.08%	4,614
Charlottesville	4,091	31.99%	7,916	61.90%	565	4.42%	217	1.70%	-3,825	-29.91%	12,789
Chesapeake	29,251	46.66%	28,713	45.80%	4,456	7.11%	266	0.42%	538	0.86%	62,686
Chesterfield	56,650	60.71%	30,220	32.39%	6,004	6.43%	431	0.46%	26,430	28.32%	93,305
Clarke	2,201	48.17%	1,906	41.72%	379	8.30%	83	1.82%	295	6.45%	4,569
Clifton Forge	486	29.62%	974	59.35%	147	8.96%	34	2.07%	-488	-29.73%	1,641
Colonial Heights	4,632	66.62%	1,782	25.63%	518	7.45%	21	0.30%	2,850	40.99%	6,953
Covington	763	31.10%	1,394	56.83%	255	10.40%	41	1.67%	-631	-25.73%	2,453
Craig	979	45.35%	895	41.45%	262	12.14%	23	1.07%	84	3.90%	2,159
Culpeper	5,688	53.90%	3,907	37.02%	787	7.46%	171	1.62%	1,781	16.88%	10,553
Cumberland	1,544	48.40%	1,303	40.85%	275	8.62%	68	2.13%	241	7.55%	3,190
Danville	9,254	49.97%	8,168	44.11%	762	4.11%	335	1.81%	1,086	5.86%	18,519
Dickenson	2,229	32.45%	3,913	56.97%	660	9.61%	66	0.96%	-1,684	-24.52%	6,868
Dinwiddie	3,503	42.90%	3,871	47.40%	666	8.16%	126	1.54%	-368	-4.50%	8,166
Emporia	835	40.65%	1,103	53.70%	98	4.77%	18	0.88%	-268	-13.05%	2,054
Essex	1,627	46.05%	1,668	47.21%	188	5.32%	50	1.42%	-41	-1.16%	3,533
Fairfax	176,033	48.19%	170,150	46.58%	16,134	4.42%	2,946	0.81%	5,883	1.61%	365,263
Fairfax City	4,319	49.39%	3,909	44.70%	422	4.83%	95	1.09%	410	4.69%	8,745
Falls Church	1,644	38.38%	2,375	55.44%	202	4.72%	63	1.47%	-731	-17.06%	4,284
Fauquier	11,063	57.45%	6,759	35.10%	1,287	6.68%	149	0.77%	4,304	22.35%	19,258
Floyd	2,374	48.07%	1,909	38.65%	545	11.03%	111	2.25%	465	9.42%	4,939
Fluvanna	3,442	51.66%	2,676	40.16%	457	6.86%	88	1.32%	766	11.50%	6,663
Franklin	7,382	43.46%	7,300	42.97%	2,015	11.86%	290	1.71%	82	0.49%	16,987
Franklin City	1,200	35.45%	1,962	57.96%	201	5.94%	22	0.65%	-762	-22.51%	3,385
Frederick	10,608	57.61%	5,976	32.46%	1,599	8.68%	229	1.24%	4,632	25.15%	18,412
Fredericksburg	2,579	41.84%	3,215	52.16%	300	4.87%	70	1.14%	-636	-10.32%	6,164
Galax	910	41.72%	1,033	47.36%	221	10.13%	17	0.78%	-123	-5.64%	2,181
Giles	2,566	38.15%	3,196	47.52%	841	12.50%	123	1.83%	-630	-9.37%	6,726
Gloucester	6,447	51.20%	4,710	37.40%	1,266	10.05%	170	1.35%	1,737	13.80%	12,593
Goochland	4,119	55.47%	2,784	37.49%	424	5.71%	98	1.32%	1,335	17.98%	7,425
Grayson	3,004	46.92%	2,661	41.56%	675	10.54%	63	0.98%	343	5.36%	6,403
Greene	2,351	55.29%	1,440	33.87%	346	8.14%	115	2.70%	911	21.42%	4,252
Greensville	1,176	30.60%	2,381	61.96%	263	6.84%	23	0.60%	-1,205	-31.36%	3,843
Halifax	6,490	49.07%	5,599	42.33%	876	6.62%	261	1.97%	891	6.74%	13,226
Hampton	16,596	37.29%	24,493	55.03%	2,783	6.25%	635	1.43%	-7,897	-17.74%	44,507
Hanover	22,086	63.60%	9,880	28.45%	2,447	7.05%	311	0.90%	12,206	35.15%	34,724
Harrisonburg	4,945	55.33%	3,346	37.44%	434	4.86%	212	2.37%	1,599	17.89%	8,937
Henrico	54,430	53.37%	41,121	40.32%	5,920	5.80%	521	0.51%	13,309	13.05%	101,992
Henry	9,110	43.64%	9,061	43.41%	2,370	11.35%	333	1.60%	49	0.23%	20,874
Highland	631	51.68%	446	36.53%	134	10.97%	10	0.82%	185	15.15%	1,221
Hopewell	3,493	49.46%	2,868	40.61%	550	7.79%	151	2.14%	625	8.85%	7,062
Isle of Wight	5,416	47.64%	4,952	43.56%	893	7.85%	108	0.95%	464	4.08%	11,369
James City	10,120	54.45%	7,247	38.99%	1,116	6.00%	103	0.55%	2,873	15.46%	18,586
King and Queen	1,073	38.93%	1,393	50.54%	213	7.73%	77	2.79%	-320	-11.61%	2,756
King George	2,597	53.62%	1,875	38.72%	341	7.04%	30	0.62%	722	14.90%	4,843
King William	2,346	52.49%	1,765	39.49%	339	7.59%	19	0.43%	581	13.00%	4,469
Lancaster	2,709	55.36%	1,844	37.69%	324	6.62%	16	0.33%	865	17.67%	4,893
Lee	3,225	37.48%	4,444	51.65%	822	9.55%	113	1.31%	-1,219	-14.17%	8,604
Lexington	850	41.56%	1,059	51.78%	112	5.48%	24	1.17%	-209	-10.22%	2,045
Loudoun	25,715	52.13%	19,942	40.43%	3,082	6.25%	591	1.20%	5,773	11.70%	49,330
Louisa	3,768	45.27%	3,761	45.19%	693	8.33%	101	1.21%	7	0.08%	8,323
Lunenburg	2,063	46.26%	1,995	44.73%	299	6.70%	103	2.31%	68	1.53%	4,460
Lynchburg	11,441	49.72%	10,281	44.68%	1,155	5.02%	135	0.59%	1,160	5.04%	23,012
Madison	2,296	50.91%	1,734	38.45%	360	7.98%	120	2.66%	562	12.46%	4,510
Manassas	5,799	52.91%	4,378	39.95%	670	6.11%	113	1.03%	1,421	12.96%	10,960
Manassas Park	916	49.84%	748	40.70%	151	8.22%	23	1.25%	168	9.14%	1,838
Martinsville	2,446	41.87%	2,941	50.34%	387	6.62%	68	1.16%	-495	-8.47%	5,842
Mathews	2,206	51.78%	1,602	37.61%	403	9.46%	49	1.15%	604	14.17%	4,260
Mecklenburg	4,933	48.00%	4,408	42.89%	789	7.68%	148	1.44%	525	5.11%	10,278
Middlesex	2,141	49.83%	1,704	39.66%	350	8.15%	102	2.37%	437	10.17%	4,297
Montgomery	10,517	43.28%	10,867	44.72%	2,594	10.68%	320	1.32%	-350	-1.44%	24,298
Nelson	1,988	37.77%	2,782	52.85%	411	7.81%	83	1.58%	-794	-15.08%	5,264
New Kent	2,852	54.15%	1,859	35.30%	520	9.87%	36	0.68%	993	18.85%	5,267
Newport News	23,072	42.50%	27,678	50.98%	3,090	5.69%	448	0.83%	-4,606	-8.48%	54,288
Norfolk	18,693	31.09%	37,655	62.63%	3,435	5.71%	341	0.57%	-18,962	-31.54%	60,124
Northampton	1,763	35.63%	2,569	51.92%	522	10.55%	94	1.90%	-806	-16.29%	4,948
Northumberland	2,605	51.81%	1,957	38.92%	375	7.46%	91	1.81%	648	12.89%	5,028
Norton	416	30.10%	802	58.03%	138	9.99%	26	1.88%	-386	-27.93%	1,382
Nottoway	2,416	46.34%	2,327	44.63%	346	6.64%	125	2.40%	89	1.71%	5,214
Orange	4,435	49.79%	3,590	40.30%	750	8.42%	133	1.49%	845	9.49%	8,908
Page	3,876	51.83%	2,868	38.35%	640	8.56%	95	1.27%	1,008	13.48%	7,479
Patrick	3,547	52.39%	2,301	33.98%	719	10.62%	204	3.01%	1,246	18.41%	6,771
Petersburg	2,261	20.76%	8,105	74.43%	423	3.88%	101	0.93%	-5,844	-53.67%	10,890
Pittsylvania	12,127	55.85%	7,681	35.37%	1,469	6.77%	437	2.01%	4,446	20.48%	21,714
Poquoson	3,422	64.86%	1,409	26.71%	400	7.58%	45	0.85%	2,013	38.15%	5,276
Portsmouth	10,686	30.18%	22,150	62.55%	2,238	6.32%	335	0.95%	-11,464	-32.37%	35,409
Powhatan	4,679	61.22%	2,254	29.49%	626	8.19%	84	1.10%	2,425	31.73%	7,643
Prince Edward	2,530	44.56%	2,678	47.16%	403	7.10%	67	1.18%	-148	-2.60%	5,678
Prince George	5,216	54.86%	3,498	36.79%	698	7.34%	95	1.00%	1,718	18.07%	9,507
Prince William	39,292	50.09%	33,462	42.66%	4,881	6.22%	808	1.03%	5,830	7.43%	78,443
Pulaski	5,387	43.78%	5,333	43.34%	1,399	11.37%	185	1.50%	54	0.44%	12,304
Radford	1,742	40.67%	2,113	49.33%	381	8.90%	47	1.10%	-371	-8.66%	4,283
Rappahannock	1,505	47.31%	1,405	44.17%	213	6.70%	58	1.82%	100	3.14%	3,181
Richmond	1,424	50.91%	1,101	39.36%	201	7.19%	71	2.54%	323	11.55%	2,797
Richmond City	20,993	31.30%	42,273	63.02%	2,762	4.12%	1,050	1.57%	-21,280	-31.72%	67,078
Roanoke	20,700	52.51%	15,387	39.03%	2,934	7.44%	400	1.01%	5,313	13.48%	39,421
Roanoke City	12,283	38.37%	17,282	53.98%	2,169	6.77%	282	0.88%	-4,999	-15.61%	32,016
Rockbridge	3,274	44.98%	3,116	42.81%	760	10.44%	129	1.77%	158	2.17%	7,279
Rockingham	14,035	64.66%	5,867	27.03%	1,318	6.07%	487	2.24%	8,168	37.63%	21,707
Russell	3,706	36.59%	5,437	53.68%	862	8.51%	123	1.21%	-1,731	-17.09%	10,128
Salem	4,936	48.97%	4,282	42.48%	796	7.90%	65	0.64%	654	6.49%	10,079
Scott	4,086	47.66%	3,449	40.23%	798	9.31%	240	2.80%	637	7.43%	8,573
Shenandoah	7,440	56.02%	4,224	31.81%	1,353	10.19%	263	1.98%	3,216	24.21%	13,280
Smyth	4,966	42.74%	4,990	42.95%	1,407	12.11%	256	2.20%	-24	-0.21%	11,619
Southampton	2,275	33.88%	3,454	51.44%	564	8.40%	422	6.28%	-1,179	-17.56%	6,715
Spotsylvania	13,786	52.62%	10,342	39.48%	1,860	7.10%	209	0.80%	3,444	13.14%	26,197
Stafford	14,098	54.04%	9,902	37.95%	1,856	7.11%	233	0.89%	4,196	16.09%	26,089
Staunton	4,526	53.66%	3,162	37.49%	605	7.17%	142	1.68%	1,364	16.17%	8,435
Suffolk	8,572	41.30%	10,827	52.17%	1,266	6.10%	89	0.43%	-2,255	-10.87%	20,754
Surry	944	32.13%	1,753	59.67%	181	6.16%	60	2.04%	-809	-27.54%	2,938
Sussex	1,378	36.34%	2,089	55.09%	256	6.75%	69	1.82%	-711	-18.75%	3,792
Tazewell	6,131	39.71%	7,500	48.58%	1,554	10.06%	255	1.65%	-1,369	-8.87%	15,440
Virginia Beach	63,741	50.61%	52,142	41.40%	9,328	7.41%	732	0.58%	11,599	9.21%	125,943
Warren	4,657	48.25%	3,814	39.52%	904	9.37%	277	2.87%	843	8.73%	9,652
Washington	9,098	50.07%	6,939	38.19%	1,654	9.10%	478	2.63%	2,159	11.88%	18,169
Waynesboro	3,466	52.71%	2,398	36.47%	462	7.03%	250	3.80%	1,068	16.24%	6,576
Westmoreland	2,333	40.31%	2,949	50.95%	427	7.38%	79	1.36%	-616	-10.64%	5,788
Williamsburg	1,560	43.43%	1,820	50.67%	162	4.51%	50	1.39%	-260	-7.24%	3,592
Winchester	3,681	50.97%	3,027	41.91%	434	6.01%	80	1.11%	654	9.06%	7,222
Wise	4,660	35.59%	6,712	51.27%	1,478	11.29%	242	1.85%	-2,052	-15.68%	13,092
Wythe	4,274	49.99%	3,275	38.31%	955	11.17%	45	0.53%	999	11.68%	8,549
York	11,396	54.95%	7,731	37.28%	1,469	7.08%	142	0.68%	3,665	17.67%	20,738
Totals	1,138,350	47.10%	1,091,060	45.15%	159,861	6.62%	27,371	1.13%	47,290	1.95%	2,416,642

==== Counties that flipped from Democratic to Republican ====
- Henry

==== Counties and independent cities that flipped from Republican to Democratic ====
- Accomack
- Bath
- Bedford City
- Buckingham
- Dinwiddie
- Emporia
- Essex
- Galax
- Newport News
- Prince Edward
- Smyth

==== By congressional district ====
Dole won seven of 11 congressional districts, including three which elected Democrats, while Clinton won the remaining four districts, including one which elected a Republican.

District	Dole	Clinton	Perot	Representative
1st	51.9%	39.8%	7.2%	Herb Bateman
2nd	48%	44.1%	7.3%	Owen Pickett
3rd	22.2%	72%	4.7%	Bobby Scott
4th	46.3%	45.6%	7.1%	Norman Sisisky
5th	47.8%	42.7%	7.8%	Lewis Payne
5th	47.8%	42.7%	7.8%	Virgil Goode
6th	50.3%	40.6%	7.5%	Bob Goodlatte
7th	58.2%	34.8%	6.2%	Tom Bliley
8th	40.3%	54.8%	4%	Jim Moran
9th	42.6%	45.6%	10.3%	Rick Boucher
10th	54.2%	38.3%	6.3%	Frank Wolf
11th	46.2%	48.1%	4.8%	Tom Davis
