= 2024 United States presidential election in Virginia =

- November 5, 2024
- Turnout: 70.48% (▼4.6 pp)

Nominee	Kamala Harris	Donald Trump
Party	Democratic	Republican
Home state	California	Florida
Running mate	Tim Walz	JD Vance
Electoral vote	13	0
Popular vote	2,335,395	2,075,085
Percentage	51.83%	46.05%

Harris
40–50%
50–60%
60–70%
70–80%
80–90%
90–100%
Trump
40–50%
50–60%
60–70%
70–80%
80–90%
90–100%
Tie/No data
President before election
Joe Biden
Democratic
Elected President
Donald Trump
Republican

The 2024 United States presidential election in Virginia took place on Tuesday, November 5, 2024, as part of the 2024 United States presidential election in which all 50 states plus the District of Columbia participated. Virginia voters chose electors to represent them in the Electoral College via a popular vote. The state of Virginia has 13 electoral votes in the Electoral College, following reapportionment due to the 2020 United States census in which the state neither gained nor lost a seat.

Before the election, most news organizations considered Virginia a likely win for Harris. This was the first presidential election in which both major party candidates received more than 2 million votes in Virginia. On election day, Harris won Virginia with 51.83% of the vote, carrying the state by a margin of 5.78%, similar to the 2016 results, albeit slightly wider. In 2016, Virginia U.S. Senator Tim Kaine was the Democratic vice presidential nominee. Kaine also won by a slightly larger 9 percentage point margin in the concurrent U.S. Senate election in Virginia.

Harris became the first Democratic nominee to win Virginia while losing the nationwide popular vote since 1924. Meanwhile, neighboring West Virginia gave Trump 70% of the vote, with the two states differing by 48 percentage points in margin. Trump became the first president to win two terms without ever carrying Virginia since Bill Clinton in 1992 and 1996, and the first Republican to do so since William McKinley in 1896 and 1900.

Although Virginia swung rightward in 2024, it trended leftward and voted over 7 percentage points to the left of the nation, compared to 5 percentage points in 2020, and 3 percentage points in 2016. This was also the first time a Democratic nominee who lost the popular vote won an absolute majority of the vote in Virginia since 1924.

This election confirmed Virginia's status as a blue state. Virginia voted for the loser of the popular vote for the first time since 2000, and the loser of both the electoral vote and popular vote since 1996. This was similar to how Florida in 2024 voted for Trump by over 13%, after Florida in 2020 backed Trump despite him losing both the electoral vote and popular vote. (Note: Despite both Virginia and Florida backing Republican George W. Bush and Democrat Barack Obama twice, the two have diverged in the Trump era. For the first time since 1876, Virginia has always voted Democratic and Florida has always voted Republican in the Trump era.)

== Primary elections ==
=== Democratic primary ===
The Virginia Democratic primary was held on Super Tuesday, March 5, 2024. Incumbent president Joe Biden won the state and all 11 of its congressional districts, securing 99 pledged delegates. Activist Marianne Williamson garnered 8% of the vote total, which was her second-best performance on Super Tuesday after Oklahoma.

Popular vote share by county and independent city Biden: 70–80%; 80–90%; >90%

Virginia Democratic pres. primary
Candidate	Votes	%	Delegates
Joe Biden (incumbent)	317,329	88.51	99
Marianne Williamson	28,599	7.98	0
Dean Phillips	12,586	3.51	0
Total	358,514	100%	99

=== Republican primary ===
The Virginia Republican primary was held on Super Tuesday, March 5, 2024. Former president Donald Trump defeated former South Carolina governor Nikki Haley, attaining 42 pledged delegates to the Republican National Convention in July. Trump performed best in southwest Virginia, while Haley's strength lay in Charlottesville, Albemarle County, the urban areas of Richmond and the suburbs surrounding Washington, D.C.

Popular vote share by county and independent city Trump: 40–50%; 50–60%; 60–70%; 70–80%; 80–90%; >90%; Haley: 50–60%; 60–70%; 70–80%

Virginia Republican primary, March 5, 2024
Candidate	Votes	Percentage	Actual delegate count		
Candidate	Votes	Percentage	Bound	Unbound	Total
Donald Trump	440,416	62.99%	39	3	42
Nikki Haley	244,586	34.98%	6		6
Ron DeSantis (withdrawn)	7,494	1.07%			
Chris Christie (withdrawn)	3,384	0.48%			
Vivek Ramaswamy (withdrawn)	2,503	0.36%			
Ryan Binkley (withdrawn)	853	0.12%			
Total:	699,236	100.00%	45	3	48

== General election ==
=== Voting law changes ===
In August 2024, Virginia governor Glenn Youngkin signed an executive order removing 6,303 voters suspected of being non-citizens from Virginia's voter rolls. In October 2024, the Department of Justice sued the Virginia Board of Elections and Virginia commissioner of elections over the voter purge, accusing that it violated the National Voter Registration Act. The suit also found a number of alleged non-citizens purged were actually citizens. District judge Patricia Tolliver Giles ruled that the removal was illegal, ordering the state to stop purging voter rolls and to restore the voter registration of more than 1,600 voters who had been removed. The 4th Circuit Court of Appeals then upheld the order. The administration filed an emergency appeal to the Supreme Court, which sided with Virginia in a 6–3 decision, allowing the state to continue purging voter rolls.

=== Predictions ===
Source	Ranking	As of
The Cook Political Report	Likely D	June 12, 2024
Inside Elections	Likely D	April 26, 2023
Sabato's Crystal Ball	Likely D	August 27, 2024
The Economist	Likely D	September 10, 2024
CNalysis	Solid D	September 15, 2024
CNN	Lean D	August 18, 2024
538	Likely D	August 23, 2024
NBC News	Likely D	October 6, 2024
YouGov	Safe D	October 16, 2024
Split Ticket	Likely D	November 1, 2024

=== Polling ===
Kamala Harris vs. Donald Trump

Aggregate polls

Source of poll aggregation	Dates administered	Dates updated	Kamala Harris Democratic	Donald Trump Republican	Undecided (Note: Calculated by taking the difference of 100% and all other candidates combined.)	Margin
270ToWin	October 2 - November 1, 2024	November 4, 2024	49.8%	41.0%	9.2%	Harris +8.8%
538	through November 4, 2024	November 4, 2024	49.9%	43.7%	6.4%	Harris +6.2%
Silver Bulletin	through November 3, 2024	November 3, 2024	49.5%	43.2%	7.3%	Harris +6.3%
The Hill/DDHQ	through November 4, 2024	November 4, 2024	50.1%	45.1%	4.8%	Harris +5.0%
Average			49.8%	43.3%	6.9%	Harris +6.5%

Poll source	Date(s) administered	Sample size (Note: Key: A – all adults RV – registered voters LV – likely voters V – unclear)	Margin of error	Kamala Harris Democratic	Donald Trump Republican	Other / Undecided
AtlasIntel	November 3–4, 2024	2,202 (LV)	± 2.0%	51%	46%	3%
Research Co.	November 2–3, 2024	450 (LV)	± 4.6%	51%	45%	4%
ActiVote	October 2–28, 2024	400 (LV)	± 4.9%	54%	46%	–
Rasmussen Reports (R) (Note: Poll sponsored by American Thinker)	October 24–25, 2024	1,014 (LV)	± 3.0%	48%	46%	6% (Note: "Other" with 4%)
CES/YouGov	October 1–25, 2024	2,027 (A)	–	53%	44%	3%
CES/YouGov	October 1–25, 2024	2,015 (LV)	–	53%	44%	3%
Quantus Insights (R) (Note: Poll sponsored by TrendingPolitics)	October 22−24, 2024	725 (LV)	± 3.6%	49%	48%	3%
Braun Research (Note: Poll sponsored by The Washington Post & the Schar School of Policy and Government)	October 19−23, 2024	1,004 (RV)	± 3.5%	48%	42%	9%
Braun Research	October 19−23, 2024	1,004 (LV)	± 3.5%	49%	43%	8%
Christopher Newport University	September 28 − October 4, 2024	800 (LV)	± 4.4%	52%	41%	7% (Note: "Someone else" with 3%)
Emerson College (Note: Poll sponsored by WAVY-TV, WRIC-TV, WFXR-TV, & WDCW-TV)	September 22−24, 2024	860 (LV)	± 3.3%	52%	44%	4% (Note: "Someone else" with 1%)
Emerson College	September 22−24, 2024	860 (LV)	± 3.3%	53% (Note: With voters who lean towards a given candidate)	46%	1%
Morning Consult	September 9−18, 2024	899 (LV)	± 3.0%	51%	44%	5%
Rasmussen Reports (R)	September 19−22, 2024	1,144 (LV)	± 3.0%	49%	46%	5%
ActiVote	August 19 – September 17, 2024	400 (LV)	± 4.9%	55%	45%	–
Research America Inc. (Note: Poll sponsored by the Center for Leadership and Media Studies at the University of Mary Washington)	September 3−9, 2024	1,000 (A)	± 3.1%	45%	45%	10% (Note: "Other candidate" with 3%; "None/Would not vote" with 2%; "Refused" with 1%)
Research America Inc.	September 3−9, 2024	756 (LV)	± 4.1%	48%	46%	6% (Note: "Other candidate" with 3%; "Refused" with 1%)
Washington Post/Schar School	September 4–8, 2024	1,005 (RV)	± 3.5%	51%	43%	6% (Note: "Would not vote" with 1%)
Washington Post/Schar School	September 4–8, 2024	1,005 (LV)	± 3.5%	51%	43%	6%
Morning Consult	August 30 – September 8, 2024	873 (LV)	± 3.0%	52%	42%	6%
	August 23, 2024	Robert F. Kennedy Jr. suspends his presidential campaign and endorses Donald Trump.				
Quantus Insights (R)	August 20–22, 2024	629 (RV)	± 4.0%	47%	44%	9%
	August 19–22, 2024	Democratic National Convention				
Roanoke College	August 12–16, 2024	691 (LV)	± 4.5%	47%	44%	10% (Note: "Someone else" with 8%. "Refused" and "Undecided" with 1% each)
	August 6, 2024	Kamala Harris selects Gov. Tim Walz as her running mate.				
	July 21, 2024	Joe Biden announces his official withdrawal from the race; Kamala Harris declares her candidacy for president.				
	July 15–19, 2024	Republican National Convention				
Emerson College	July 14–15, 2024	1,000 (RV)	± 3.0%	45%	47%	8%
Mainstreet Research/Florida Atlantic University	July 14–15, 2024	301 (RV)	–	43%	44%	13% (Note: "Another candidate" with 5%)
Mainstreet Research/Florida Atlantic University	July 14–15, 2024	265 (LV)	–	43%	47%	10% (Note: "Another candidate" with 4%)
	July 13, 2024	attempted assassination of Donald Trump				
Mainstreet Research/Florida Atlantic University	July 12–13, 2024	617 (RV)	± 3.9%	45%	41%	14%
Mainstreet Research/Florida Atlantic University	July 12–13, 2024	544 (LV)	± 3.9%	46%	42%	12%
New York Times/Siena College	July 9–12, 2024	661 (RV)	± 4.2%	48%	44%	8%
New York Times/Siena College	July 9–12, 2024	661 (LV)	± 4.4%	49%	44%	7%
SoCal Strategies (R) (Note: Poll sponsored by On Point Politics)	July 6–11, 2024	1,000 (RV)	± 2.1%	47%	47%	6%

Kamala Harris vs. Donald Trump vs Cornel West vs. Jill Stein vs. Chase Oliver

Poll source	Date(s) administered	Sample size	Margin of error	Kamala Harris Democratic	Donald Trump Republican	Cornel West Independent	Jill Stein Green	Chase Oliver Libertarian	Other / Undecided
AtlasIntel	November 3–4, 2024	2,202 (LV)	± 2.0%	51%	45%	–	2%	1%	1% (Note: "Other" with 1%)
Chism Strategies	October 28–30, 2024	520 (LV)	± 4.3%	45.2%	44.5%	–	1.3%	0.6%	8.4% (Note: "Someone else" with 1.6%)
Cygnal (R)	October 27–29, 2024	400 (LV)	± 4.0%	50%	43%	1%	1%	0%	5% (Note: Claudia De La Cruz (PSL) with 0%)
Roanoke College	October 25–29, 2024	851 (LV)	± 4.6%	51%	41%	2%	1%	2%	3% (Note: "Some other candidate" with 2%)
Virginia Commonwealth University	September 16–25, 2024	832 (A)	± 4.6%	43%	37%	3%	1%	–	16% (Note: "Wouldn't vote" with 4%; "Refused" with 3%; "Someone else" with 1%)
Virginia Commonwealth University	September 16–25, 2024	762 (RV)	± 4.6%	47%	37%	2%	1%	–	13% (Note: "Refused" with 3%; "Wouldn't vote" with 2%; "Someone else" with 1%)
Washington Post/Schar School	September 4–8, 2024	1,005 (RV)	± 3.5%	49%	42%	0%	1%	1%	7% (Note: Claudia De la Cruz (PSL) with 1%; "Would not vote" with 1%)
Washington Post/Schar School	September 4–8, 2024	1,005 (LV)	± 3.5%	50%	42%	0%	1%	1%	6%
Virginia Commonwealth University	August 26 – September 6, 2024	809 (A)	± 5.0%	46%	36%	2%	1%	–	15% (Note: "Wouldn't vote" with 6%; "Refused" with 2%; "Someone else" with 1%)
Virginia Commonwealth University	August 26 – September 6, 2024	749 (RV)	± 5.0%	49%	36%	1%	1%	–	13% (Note: "Wouldn't vote" with 3%; "Refused" with 2%; "Someone else" with 1%)

Hypothetical polling with Robert F. Kennedy Jr.

Kamala Harris vs. Donald Trump vs Robert F. Kennedy Jr. vs. Cornel West vs. Jill Stein vs. Chase Oliver

Poll source	Date(s) administered	Sample size	Margin of error	Kamala Harris Democratic	Donald Trump Republican	Robert Kennedy Jr Independent	Cornel West Independent	Jill Stein Green	Chase Oliver Libertarian	Other / Undecided
Research America Inc.	September 3−9, 2024	1,000 (A)	± 3.1%	44%	44%	2%	−	0%	0%	10% (Note: "Other candidate" with 2%; "None/Would not vote" with 2%; "Refused" with 1%)
Research America Inc.	September 3−9, 2024	756 (LV)	± 4.1%	47%	46%	2%	−	0%	0%	6% (Note: "Other candidate" with 2%; "Refused" with 1%)
Roanoke College	August 12–16, 2024	691 (LV)	± 4.5%	45%	42%	6%	2%	0%	2%	3%
	July 21, 2024	Joe Biden announces his official withdrawal from the race; Kamala Harris declares her candidacy for president.								
New York Times/Siena College	July 9–12, 2024	661 (RV)	± 4.2%	41%	38%	9%	0%	1%	0%	11%
New York Times/Siena College	July 9–12, 2024	661 (LV)	± 4.4%	43%	39%	7%	0%	1%	0%	10%

Kamala Harris vs. Donald Trump vs Robert F. Kennedy Jr.

Poll source	Date(s) administered	Sample size	Margin of error	Kamala Harris Democratic	Donald Trump Republican	Robert Kennedy Jr Independent	Other / Undecided
	July 21, 2024	Joe Biden announces his official withdrawal from the race; Kamala Harris declares her candidacy for president.					
Mainstreet Research/Florida Atlantic University	July 14–15, 2024	301 (RV)	–	40%	41%	7%	12%
Mainstreet Research/Florida Atlantic University	July 14–15, 2024	265 (LV)	–	41%	45%	5%	9% (Note: "Another candidate" with 3%)
Mainstreet Research/Florida Atlantic University	July 12–13, 2024	617 (RV)	± 3.9%	41%	37%	10%	12%
Mainstreet Research/Florida Atlantic University	July 12–13, 2024	544 (LV)	± 3.9%	43%	38%	10%	9%

Hypothetical polling with Joe Biden and Donald Trump

Joe Biden vs. Donald Trump

Poll source	Date(s) administered	Sample size	Margin of error	Joe Biden Democratic	Donald Trump Republican	Other / Undecided
Emerson College	July 14–15, 2024	1,000 (RV)	± 3.0%	43%	45%	12%
Emerson College	July 14–15, 2024	1,000 (RV)	± 3.0%	50%	50%	–
Mainstreet Research/Florida Atlantic University	July 14–15, 2024	301 (RV)	–	41%	44%	15%
Mainstreet Research/Florida Atlantic University	July 14–15, 2024	265 (LV)	–	44%	44%	12%
Mainstreet Research/Florida Atlantic University	July 12–13, 2024	617 (RV)	± 3.9%	45%	41%	14%
Mainstreet Research/Florida Atlantic University	July 12–13, 2024	544 (LV)	± 3.9%	47%	42%	11%
New York Times/Siena College	July 9–12, 2024	661 (RV)	± 4.2%	46%	44%	10%
New York Times/Siena College	July 9–12, 2024	661 (LV)	± 4.4%	48%	45%	7%
SoCal Strategies (R)	July 6–11, 2024	1,000 (RV)	± 2.1%	47%	44%	9%
Fox News	June 1–4, 2024	1,107 (RV)	± 3.0%	48%	48%	4%
Roanoke College	May 12–21, 2024	711 (LV)	± 4.2%	42%	42%	16%
McLaughlin & Associates (R) (Note: Poll sponsored by Trump's campaign)	April 29 – May 1, 2024	800 (LV)	± 3.4%	48%	44%	8%
Fabrizio Ward (R)/Impact Research (D) (Note: Poll sponsored by Virginians Against Neighborhood Slot Machines)	April 26–28, 2024	500 (RV)	± 4.4%	43%	42%	16%
John Zogby Strategies (Note: Poll conducted for Kennedy's campaign)	April 13–21, 2024	586 (LV)	–	45%	45%	10%
Mainstreet Research/Florida Atlantic University	February 29 – March 3, 2024	394 (RV)	–	47%	42%	11% (Note: "Another candidate" with 8%)
Mainstreet Research/Florida Atlantic University	February 29 – March 3, 2024	368 (LV)	–	47%	43%	10% (Note: "Another candidate" with 6%)
Roanoke College	February 11–19, 2024	705 (A)	± 4.6%	47%	43%	10%
Virginia Commonwealth University	December 28, 2023 – January 13, 2024	812 (A)	± 5.4%	43%	40%	17%
Mason-Dixon	December 15–19, 2023	625 (RV)	± 4.0%	49%	43%	8%
Roanoke College	November 12–20, 2023	686 (A)	± 4.3%	48%	44%	8%
Change Research (D)/Future Majority (D)	September 16–19, 2023	1,437 (RV)	–	47%	42%	11%
Research America Inc.	September 5–11, 2023	1,000 (A)	± 3.0%	37%	37%	26%
Roanoke College	August 6–15, 2023	702 (A)	± 4.2%	51%	42%	17%
Virginia Commonwealth University	July 14–25, 2023	804 (A)	± 5.4%	43%	40%	17%
Roanoke College	May 14–23, 2023	678 (A)	± 4.4%	54%	38%	8%
Public Opinion Strategies (R)	May 7–9, 2023	500 (LV)	–	48%	41%	11%
Roanoke College	February 12–21, 2023	590 (RV)	± 4.2%	47%	46%	6%

Joe Biden vs. Donald Trump vs. Robert F. Kennedy Jr. vs. Cornel West vs. Jill Stein

Poll source	Date(s) administered	Sample size	Margin of error	Joe Biden Democratic	Donald Trump Republican	Robert Kennedy Jr Independent	Cornel West Independent	Jill Stein Green	Other / Undecided
Emerson College	July 14–15, 2024	1,000 (RV)	± 3.0%	38%	43%	8%	2%	2%	7%
New York Times/Siena College	July 9–12, 2024	661 (RV)	± 4.2%	38%	36%	9%	0%	2%	15%
New York Times/Siena College	July 9–12, 2024	661 (LV)	± 4.4%	40%	38%	7%	0%	2%	13%
Virginia Commonwealth University	June 24 – July 3, 2024	809 (A)	± 4.8%	36%	39%	9%	1%	2%	13% (Note: "Undecided" with 6%; "Wouldn't vote" with 3%; "Someone else" & "Refused" with 2%)
Fox News	June 1–4, 2024	1,107 (RV)	± 3.0%	42%	41%	9%	2%	2%	4%
Roanoke College	May 12–21, 2024	711 (LV)	± 4.2%	40%	38%	8%	1%	3%	10%
McLaughlin & Associates (R)	April 29 – May 1, 2024	800 (LV)	± 3.4%	40%	37%	8%	1%	2%	12%

Joe Biden vs. Donald Trump vs. Robert F. Kennedy Jr.

Poll source	Date(s) administered	Sample size	Margin of error	Joe Biden Democratic	Donald Trump Republican	Robert Kennedy Jr Independent	Other / Undecided
Mainstreet Research/Florida Atlantic University	July 14–15, 2024	301 (RV)	–	40%	40%	5%	15% (Note: "Another candidate" with 2%)
Mainstreet Research/Florida Atlantic University	July 14–15, 2024	265 (LV)	–	43%	42%	4%	11% (Note: "Another candidate" with 1%)
Mainstreet Research/Florida Atlantic University	July 12–13, 2024	617 (RV)	± 3.9%	41%	38%	11%	10%
Mainstreet Research/Florida Atlantic University	July 12–13, 2024	544 (LV)	± 3.9%	42%	39%	10%	9%
co/efficient (R)	June 11–12, 2024	851 (LV)	± 3.4%	41%	41%	7%	11%
Mason-Dixon	December 15–19, 2023	625 (RV)	± 4.0%	42%	36%	14%	8%

Joe Biden vs. Donald Trump vs. Cornel West

Poll source	Date(s) administered	Sample size	Margin of error	Joe Biden Democratic	Donald Trump Republican	Cornel West Independent	Other / Undecided
Change Research (D)/Future Majority (D)	September 16–19, 2023	1,437 (RV)	–	40%	39%	7%	14%
Change Research (D)/Future Majority (D)	September 16–19, 2023	1,437 (RV)	–	37%	37%	5%	21% (Note: Joe Manchin with 7%)

Hypothetical polling with other candidates

Joe Biden vs. Robert F. Kennedy Jr.

Poll source	Date(s) administered	Sample size	Margin of error	Joe Biden Democratic	Robert F. Kennedy Jr. Independent	Other / Undecided
John Zogby Strategies	April 13–21, 2024	586 (LV)	–	42%	47%	11%

Robert F. Kennedy Jr. vs. Donald Trump

Poll source	Date(s) administered	Sample size	Margin of error	Robert F. Kennedy Jr. Independent	Donald Trump Republican	Other / Undecided
John Zogby Strategies	April 13–21, 2024	586 (LV)	–	43%	41%	16%

Joe Biden vs. Nikki Haley

Poll source	Date(s) administered	Sample size	Margin of error	Joe Biden Democratic	Nikki Haley Republican	Other / Undecided
Roanoke College	February 11–19, 2024	705 (A)	± 4.6%	40%	49%	11%
Virginia Commonwealth University	December 28, 2023 – January 13, 2024	812 (A)	± 5.4%	38%	43%	19%

Joe Biden vs. Ron DeSantis

Poll source	Date(s) administered	Sample size	Margin of error	Joe Biden Democratic	Ron DeSantis Republican	Other / Undecided
Virginia Commonwealth University	December 28, 2023 – January 13, 2024	812 (A)	± 5.4%	42%	39%	19%
Research America Inc.	September 5–11, 2023	1,000 (A)	± 3.0%	39%	30%	31%
Virginia Commonwealth University	July 14–25, 2023	804 (A)	± 5.46%	41%	41%	18%
Public Opinion Strategies (R)	May 7–9, 2023	500 (LV)	–	44%	44%	12%
Roanoke College	February 12–21, 2023	590 (RV)	± 4.2%	43%	48%	8%

Joe Biden vs. Glenn Youngkin

Poll source	Date(s) administered	Sample size	Margin of error	Joe Biden Democratic	Glenn Youngkin Republican	Other / Undecided
Research America Inc.	September 5–11, 2023	1,000 (A)	± 3.0%	37%	34%	29%
Virginia Commonwealth University	July 14–25, 2023	804 (A)	± 5.46%	37%	44%	19%
Roanoke College	February 12–21, 2023	590 (RV)	± 4.2%	39%	55%	6%

=== Results ===
State Senate district results

State House of Delegates district results

2024 United States presidential election in Virginia
Party	Candidate	Votes	%	±%
Democratic	Kamala Harris Tim Walz	2,335,395	51.83	−2.28
Republican	Donald Trump JD Vance	2,075,085	46.05	+2.05
Green	Jill Stein Butch Ware	34,888	0.77	N/A
Libertarian	Chase Oliver Mike ter Maat	19,814	0.44	−1.01
Independent	Cornel West Melina Abdullah	8,984	0.20	N/A
Socialism and Liberation	Claudia De la Cruz (Note: Listed on the ballot without party affiliation.) Karina Garcia	8,410	0.19	N/A
Write-in		23,365	0.52	+0.08
Total votes		4,505,941	100.00	N/A

==== By county and independent city ====
Locality	Kamala Harris Democratic		Donald Trump Republican		Other candidates Various parties		Margin		Total
Locality	#	%	#	%	#	%	#	%	Total
Accomack	7,374	42.93%	9,659	56.24%	143	0.83%	-2,285	-13.30%	17,176
Albemarle	44,279	65.87%	21,513	32.00%	1,432	2.13%	22,766	33.87%	67,224
Alexandria	62,326	77.04%	16,112	19.91%	2,466	3.05%	46,214	57.12%	80,904
Alleghany	2,114	25.49%	6,093	73.47%	86	1.04%	-3,979	-47.98%	8,293
Amelia	2,214	27.51%	5,776	71.76%	59	0.73%	-3,562	-44.25%	8,049
Amherst	5,429	31.28%	11,742	67.65%	187	1.08%	-6,313	-36.37%	17,358
Appomattox	2,324	24.00%	7,243	74.79%	118	1.22%	-4,919	-50.79%	9,685
Arlington	100,446	77.53%	25,223	19.47%	3,892	3.00%	75,223	58.06%	129,561
Augusta	11,403	25.67%	32,429	73.01%	585	1.32%	-21,026	-47.34%	44,417
Bath	588	22.76%	1,976	76.50%	19	0.74%	-1,388	-53.74%	2,583
Bedford	12,414	24.30%	38,017	74.42%	650	1.27%	-25,603	-50.12%	51,081
Bland	524	14.74%	2,998	84.33%	33	0.93%	-2,474	-69.59%	3,555
Botetourt	5,915	26.91%	15,796	71.87%	267	1.21%	-9,881	-44.96%	21,978
Bristol	2,231	29.79%	5,197	69.39%	62	0.83%	-2,966	-39.60%	7,490
Brunswick	4,184	53.98%	3,523	45.45%	44	0.57%	661	8.53%	7,751
Buchanan	1,355	14.51%	7,939	85.03%	43	0.46%	-6,584	-70.52%	9,337
Buckingham	2,988	37.70%	4,847	61.16%	90	1.14%	-1,859	-23.46%	7,925
Buena Vista	767	26.75%	2,035	70.98%	65	2.27%	-1,268	-44.23%	2,867
Campbell	7,890	25.22%	23,032	73.62%	365	1.17%	-15,142	-48.40%	31,287
Caroline	7,957	44.96%	9,511	53.74%	230	1.30%	-1,554	-8.78%	17,698
Carroll	2,925	18.06%	13,152	81.19%	123	0.76%	-10,227	-63.13%	16,200
Charles City	2,384	54.77%	1,917	44.04%	52	1.19%	467	10.73%	4,353
Charlotte	2,008	33.36%	3,963	65.83%	49	0.81%	-1,955	-32.48%	6,020
Charlottesville	19,435	82.94%	3,428	14.63%	571	2.44%	16,007	68.31%	23,434
Chesapeake	65,399	51.09%	60,550	47.30%	2,052	1.60%	4,849	3.79%	128,001
Chesterfield	112,869	53.59%	94,030	44.64%	3,729	1.77%	18,839	8.94%	210,628
Clarke	3,993	40.58%	5,641	57.33%	205	2.08%	-1,648	-16.75%	9,839
Colonial Heights	2,982	33.27%	5,883	65.63%	99	1.10%	-2,901	-32.36%	8,964
Covington	818	32.98%	1,642	66.21%	20	0.81%	-824	-33.23%	2,480
Craig	542	17.29%	2,562	81.72%	31	0.99%	-2,020	-64.43%	3,135
Culpeper	10,557	36.81%	17,685	61.67%	437	1.52%	-7,128	-24.85%	28,679
Cumberland	2,117	38.48%	3,335	60.63%	49	0.89%	-1,218	-22.14%	5,501
Danville	10,615	59.93%	6,894	38.92%	203	1.15%	3,721	21.01%	17,712
Dickenson	1,316	18.64%	5,701	80.75%	43	0.61%	-4,385	-62.11%	7,060
Dinwiddie	5,942	38.06%	9,549	61.17%	120	0.77%	-3,607	-23.11%	15,611
Emporia	1,419	65.12%	744	34.14%	16	0.73%	675	30.98%	2,179
Essex	2,775	45.69%	3,245	53.42%	54	0.89%	-470	-7.74%	6,074
Fairfax City	8,797	64.84%	4,302	31.71%	468	3.45%	4,495	33.13%	13,567
Fairfax County	386,438	65.56%	181,895	30.86%	21,094	3.58%	204,543	34.70%	589,427
Falls Church	7,200	79.45%	1,620	17.88%	242	2.67%	5,580	61.58%	9,062
Fauquier	17,180	38.38%	26,825	59.92%	763	1.70%	-9,645	-21.54%	44,768
Floyd	2,968	30.71%	6,551	67.77%	147	1.52%	-3,583	-37.07%	9,666
Fluvanna	7,731	46.17%	8,777	52.42%	235	1.40%	-1,046	-6.25%	16,743
Franklin City	2,359	60.69%	1,476	37.97%	52	1.34%	883	22.72%	3,887
Franklin County	8,321	26.82%	22,319	71.95%	380	1.23%	-13,998	-45.13%	31,020
Frederick	18,331	35.07%	33,117	63.37%	815	1.56%	-14,786	-28.29%	52,263
Fredericksburg	8,760	64.52%	4,480	32.99%	338	2.49%	4,280	31.52%	13,578
Galax	753	27.67%	1,946	71.52%	22	0.81%	-1,193	-43.84%	2,721
Giles	2,069	22.34%	7,102	76.67%	92	0.99%	-5,033	-54.33%	9,263
Gloucester	7,034	30.28%	15,918	68.53%	276	1.19%	-8,884	-38.25%	23,228
Goochland	7,875	39.89%	11,521	58.36%	346	1.75%	-3,646	-18.47%	19,742
Grayson	1,503	18.51%	6,544	80.60%	72	0.89%	-5,041	-62.09%	8,119
Greene	4,456	36.81%	7,432	61.39%	218	1.80%	-2,976	-24.58%	12,106
Greensville	2,334	54.24%	1,936	44.99%	33	0.77%	398	9.25%	4,303
Halifax	6,984	39.08%	10,741	60.10%	146	0.82%	-3,757	-21.02%	17,871
Hampton	43,357	69.01%	18,383	29.26%	1,083	1.72%	24,974	39.75%	62,823
Hanover	26,733	36.42%	45,569	62.08%	1,102	1.50%	-18,836	-25.66%	73,404
Harrisonburg	10,641	61.40%	6,266	36.15%	425	2.45%	4,375	25.24%	17,332
Henrico	115,040	63.39%	62,882	34.65%	3,567	1.97%	52,158	28.74%	181,489
Henry	8,457	33.20%	16,800	65.95%	217	0.85%	-8,343	-32.75%	25,474
Highland	416	27.10%	1,095	71.34%	24	1.56%	-679	-44.23%	1,535
Hopewell	5,078	56.26%	3,838	42.52%	110	1.22%	1,240	13.74%	9,026
Isle of Wight	9,779	39.49%	14,659	59.20%	324	1.31%	-4,880	-19.71%	24,762
James City	26,742	52.16%	23,575	45.98%	957	1.87%	3,167	6.18%	51,274
King and Queen	1,536	36.68%	2,608	62.27%	44	1.05%	-1,072	-25.60%	4,188
King George	5,657	36.65%	9,500	61.54%	280	1.81%	-3,843	-24.89%	15,437
King William	3,388	29.25%	8,080	69.76%	115	0.99%	-4,692	-40.51%	11,583
Lancaster	3,355	45.88%	3,866	52.86%	92	1.26%	-511	-6.99%	7,313
Lee	1,391	13.74%	8,674	85.69%	57	0.56%	-7,283	-71.95%	10,122
Lexington	1,795	62.00%	1,030	35.58%	70	2.42%	765	26.42%	2,895
Loudoun	129,280	56.28%	92,107	40.10%	8,305	3.62%	37,173	16.18%	229,692
Louisa	8,779	36.36%	15,084	62.48%	281	1.16%	-6,305	-26.11%	24,144
Lunenburg	2,253	38.28%	3,594	61.07%	38	0.65%	-1,341	-22.79%	5,885
Lynchburg	16,664	45.01%	19,574	52.87%	785	2.12%	-2,910	-7.86%	37,023
Madison	2,700	31.84%	5,671	66.88%	109	1.29%	-2,971	-35.04%	8,480
Manassas	9,048	56.20%	6,670	41.43%	382	2.37%	2,378	14.77%	16,100
Manassas Park	3,506	58.46%	2,314	38.59%	177	2.95%	1,192	19.88%	5,997
Martinsville	3,435	60.55%	2,155	37.99%	83	1.46%	1,280	22.56%	5,673
Mathews	1,774	29.84%	4,106	69.07%	65	1.09%	-2,332	-39.23%	5,945
Mecklenburg	6,404	39.28%	9,791	60.05%	109	0.67%	-3,387	-20.77%	16,304
Middlesex	2,473	35.80%	4,357	63.08%	77	1.11%	-1,884	-27.28%	6,907
Montgomery	23,811	50.60%	22,179	47.14%	1,063	2.26%	1,632	3.47%	47,053
Nelson	4,298	45.58%	5,004	53.06%	128	1.36%	-706	-7.49%	9,430
New Kent	5,641	33.56%	10,974	65.29%	192	1.14%	-5,333	-31.73%	16,807
Newport News	48,169	63.46%	26,385	34.76%	1,355	1.79%	21,784	28.70%	75,909
Norfolk	59,941	69.69%	24,377	28.34%	1,691	1.97%	35,564	41.35%	86,009
Northampton	3,603	52.55%	3,183	46.43%	70	1.02%	420	6.13%	6,856
Northumberland	3,202	38.90%	4,938	59.99%	92	1.12%	-1,736	-21.09%	8,232
Norton	458	27.86%	1,174	71.41%	12	0.73%	-716	-43.55%	1,644
Nottoway	2,636	38.38%	4,168	60.68%	65	0.95%	-1,532	-22.30%	6,869
Orange	8,274	37.02%	13,764	61.58%	315	1.41%	-5,490	-24.56%	22,353
Page	2,976	22.46%	10,123	76.39%	152	1.15%	-7,147	-53.94%	13,251
Patrick	1,886	19.41%	7,746	79.70%	87	0.90%	-5,860	-60.29%	9,719
Petersburg	11,219	85.52%	1,702	12.97%	198	1.51%	9,517	72.54%	13,119
Pittsylvania	9,599	28.10%	24,310	71.17%	247	0.72%	-14,711	-43.07%	34,156
Poquoson	2,119	26.27%	5,800	71.92%	146	1.81%	-3,681	-45.64%	8,065
Portsmouth	28,306	68.45%	12,370	29.91%	677	1.64%	15,936	38.54%	41,353
Powhatan	5,734	27.42%	14,918	71.33%	262	1.25%	-9,184	-43.91%	20,914
Prince Edward	4,539	47.98%	4,782	50.55%	139	1.47%	-243	-2.57%	9,460
Prince George	6,842	38.80%	10,590	60.06%	201	1.14%	-3,748	-21.26%	17,633
Prince William	131,128	57.33%	90,203	39.44%	7,381	3.23%	40,925	17.89%	228,712
Pulaski	4,830	27.22%	12,732	71.75%	182	1.03%	-7,902	-44.53%	17,744
Radford	3,231	49.08%	3,197	48.56%	155	2.35%	34	0.52%	6,583
Rappahannock	2,041	40.30%	2,943	58.10%	81	1.60%	-902	-17.81%	5,065
Richmond City	88,710	81.59%	17,041	15.67%	2,980	2.74%	71,669	65.91%	108,731
Richmond County	1,439	34.52%	2,697	64.71%	32	0.77%	-1,258	-30.18%	4,168
Roanoke City	25,737	60.82%	15,787	37.31%	790	1.87%	9,950	23.51%	42,314
Roanoke County	21,693	38.03%	34,453	60.39%	902	1.58%	-12,760	-22.37%	57,048
Rockbridge	4,160	32.43%	8,468	66.01%	200	1.56%	-4,308	-33.58%	12,828
Rockingham	15,035	30.78%	33,033	67.62%	785	1.61%	-17,998	-36.84%	48,853
Russell	2,172	16.03%	11,303	83.44%	72	0.53%	-9,131	-67.40%	13,547
Salem	5,237	39.65%	7,769	58.82%	201	1.52%	-2,532	-19.17%	13,207
Scott	1,607	14.51%	9,392	84.79%	78	0.70%	-7,785	-70.28%	11,077
Shenandoah	6,914	28.23%	17,215	70.30%	360	1.47%	-10,301	-42.06%	24,489
Smyth	2,805	19.39%	11,521	79.63%	142	0.98%	-8,716	-60.24%	14,468
Southampton	3,626	36.79%	6,133	62.23%	97	0.98%	-2,507	-25.44%	9,856
Spotsylvania	35,747	44.96%	42,531	53.49%	1,236	1.55%	-6,784	-8.53%	79,514
Stafford	41,252	49.38%	40,590	48.59%	1,697	2.03%	662	0.79%	83,539
Staunton	7,592	55.72%	5,778	42.40%	256	1.88%	1,814	13.31%	13,626
Suffolk	30,597	57.14%	22,112	41.30%	836	1.56%	8,485	15.85%	53,545
Surry	2,176	49.00%	2,205	49.65%	60	1.35%	-29	-0.65%	4,441
Sussex	2,539	51.82%	2,322	47.39%	39	0.80%	217	4.43%	4,900
Tazewell	3,030	15.22%	16,711	83.95%	165	0.83%	-13,681	-68.73%	19,906
Virginia Beach	115,412	50.45%	109,375	47.81%	3,984	1.74%	6,037	2.64%	228,771
Warren	6,910	30.47%	15,400	67.90%	369	1.63%	-8,490	-37.44%	22,679
Washington	6,772	22.94%	22,455	76.07%	291	0.99%	-15,683	-53.13%	29,518
Waynesboro	5,240	46.29%	5,882	51.97%	197	1.74%	-642	-5.67%	11,319
Westmoreland	4,491	42.34%	6,003	56.59%	113	1.07%	-1,512	-14.25%	10,607
Williamsburg	5,613	71.10%	2,119	26.84%	162	2.05%	3,494	44.26%	7,894
Winchester	6,407	53.87%	5,252	44.16%	235	1.98%	1,155	9.71%	11,894
Wise	3,036	18.06%	13,655	81.22%	121	0.72%	-10,619	-63.16%	16,812
Wythe	3,075	19.87%	12,267	79.27%	133	0.86%	-9,192	-59.40%	15,475
York	18,296	46.03%	20,722	52.13%	731	1.84%	-2,426	-6.10%	39,749
Totals	2,335,395	51.83%	2,075,085	46.05%	95,461	2.12%	260,310	5.78%	4,505,941

===== Counties and independent cities that flipped from Democratic to Republican =====
- Lynchburg (independent city)
- Prince Edward (largest municipality: Farmville)
- Surry (largest municipality: Claremont)

==== By congressional district ====
Harris won six of 11 congressional districts.

District	Harris	Trump	Representative
1st	47%	52%	Rob Wittman
2nd	49.1%	49.3%	Jen Kiggans
3rd	66%	32%	Bobby Scott
4th	65%	33%	Jennifer McClellan
5th	43%	55%	Bob Good (118th Congress)
5th	43%	55%	John McGuire (119th Congress)
6th	37%	61%	Ben Cline
7th	50%	47%	Abigail Spanberger (118th Congress)
7th	50%	47%	Eugene Vindman (119th Congress)
8th	73%	24%	Don Beyer
9th	27%	71%	Morgan Griffith
10th	53%	44%	Jennifer Wexton (118th Congress)
10th	53%	44%	Suhas Subramanyam (119th Congress)
11th	65%	31%	Gerry Connolly

== Analysis ==
Despite losing the state, Trump made notable gains across much of the Commonwealth, particularly in the Northern and Southside regions of Virginia. In Northern Virginia, Trump made significant gains in Loudoun County, Virginia (21% Asian and 14% Hispanic), Fairfax County, Virginia (20% Asian and 17% Hispanic), and Prince William County, Virginia (10% Asian and 25% Hispanic), which have significant Asian and Hispanic populations. Northern Virginia as a whole swung 8% rightward. The state also swung rightward in the concurrent 2024 United States Senate election in Virginia, as Democrat Tim Kaine won by a 9% margin, down from his 16% margin in 2018.

Trump reclaimed Lynchburg City, flipped Prince Edward County, which had not voted Republican in a presidential election since 2000, and also flipped Surry County, which last supported a Republican presidential candidate in 1972. Harris, by contrast, did not flip any counties or independent cities in Virginia.

Harris did improve slightly in some Greater Richmond counties, including Chesterfield County. Virginia was one of the few states in the country to have many counties shift leftward. Despite losing York County (home to Yorktown, Virginia), Harris won 46% of the vote in the county, the highest percentage since 1964.

This was the first time since 2000 that Virginia voted for the popular vote loser, and the first time since 1996 that Virginia backed the loser of both the electoral vote and the overall popular vote. Virginia voted over 7 percentage points to the left of the nation (5.78%+1.48%=7.26%), voting for a Democratic nominee who lost the popular vote for the first time since 1924.

=== National trends ===
Harris won the state by 5.78%, worse than Biden's 10.11% margin but slightly improved from Hillary Clinton's 5.32% margin in 2016. Tim Kaine was the 2016 Democratic vice presidential nominee, likely providing a home state advantage to Clinton in 2016.

Nevertheless, Trump became the first ever Republican to win the White House without carrying the city of Virginia Beach since it became an independent city in 1952 as well as the first to do so without carrying Chesterfield or Stafford Counties since Calvin Coolidge in 1924, and the first to do so without carrying James City County or the city of Chesapeake since Richard Nixon in 1968. Trump became the first president to win two terms without ever carrying Virginia since Bill Clinton in 1992 and 1996, and the first Republican to do so since William McKinley in 1896 and 1900.

This was also the third consecutive election in which Virginia voted Democratic while Florida voted Republican, which had previously not occurred since 1876. Trump won Florida in 2024 by over 13 percentage points, with Florida having backed Trump even when Trump lost both the electoral vote and popular vote in 2020. While Florida shifted dramatically rightward during the Trump era, Virginia shifted dramatically leftward.

Although Harris lost both swing states of North Carolina and Georgia, two other Southern states, both also trended leftward. Both swung by less than 3%, compared to the national swing of about 6%. Harris outperformed Clinton’s 2016 margins in both Southern swing states. Harris won in Virginia, as over 18% of adults in Virginia have graduate degrees, per List of U.S. states and territories by educational attainment. By comparison, just 13-14% of adults in North Carolina and Georgia have graduate degrees.

== See also ==
- United States presidential elections in Virginia
- 2024 United States presidential election
- 2024 Democratic Party presidential primaries
- 2024 Republican Party presidential primaries
- 2024 Virginia elections
- 2024 United States elections
