= 2000 United States presidential election in Virginia =

- November 7, 2000
- Turnout: 67.2%

Nominee	George W. Bush	Al Gore
Party	Republican	Democratic
Home state	Texas	Tennessee
Running mate	Dick Cheney	Joe Lieberman
Electoral vote	13	0
Popular vote	1,437,490	1,217,290
Percentage	52.47%	44.44%

Bush
40–50%
50–60%
60–70%
70–80%
80–90%
Gore
40–50%
50–60%
60–70%
70–80%
80–90%
90–100%
Tie/no data
President before election
Bill Clinton
Democratic
Elected President
George W. Bush
Republican

The 2000 United States presidential election in Virginia took place on November 7, 2000, and was part of the 2000 United States presidential election. Voters chose 13 representatives, or electors, to the Electoral College, who voted for president and vice president.

Virginia had not gone Democratic in a presidential contest since 1964, and was won by Texas Governor George W. Bush with a margin of victory of 8.03%.

At the time, Virginia was considered to be a reliably Republican state. This was the last time Virginia voted to the right of West Virginia. Virginia would not vote Democratic again until 2008. Until 2024, this was the last time Virginia voted for the loser of the popular vote.

This was the last time a Republican won Northern Virginia. Gore lost Fairfax County, the most populous county in Virginia, by less than 2 percentage points. The county shifted leftward compared to the prior election, despite the state shifting rightward by 6%.

As of the 2024 presidential election, this was the last time that Russell County, Southampton County, and the independent City of Norton voted Democratic for president, and the last time Fairfax County, Albemarle County, and the independent cities of Fairfax, Danville, and Williamsburg voted Republican for president.

== General election ==
=== Polling ===
Poll source	Date(s)	Sample size	Margin of error	George W. Bush (R)	Al Gore (D)	Ralph Nader (G)	Other / undecided (Note: Calculated by taking the difference of 100% and all other listed candidates combined. For polls that do not report a figure for Nader, this includes his support.)
SurveyUSA	November 4, 2000	500	—	53%	42%	—	5%
Harris Insights & Analytics	November 3, 2000	7,488	—	51%	45%	3%	1%
Mason-Dixon Polling & Strategy	October 31, 2000	625	—	49%	41%	3%	7%
Rasmussen Reports	October 30, 2000	897	—	50%	40%	—	10%
Richmond Times-Dispatch	October 30, 2000	735	—	46%	40%	—	14%
SurveyUSA	October 30, 2000	500	—	52%	43%	—	5%
Mason-Dixon Polling & Strategy	October 25, 2000	627	—	48%	41%	3%	8%
ABC News/The Washington Post	October 24, 2000	1,009	—	49%	45%	3%	3%
Rasmussen Reports	October 24, 2000	1,100	—	50%	38%	—	12%
Virginia Commonwealth University L. Douglas Wilder School of Government and Public Affairs	October 21, 2000	596	—	54%	40%	—	6%

=== Results ===
2000 United States presidential election in Virginia
Party	Candidate	Running mate	Votes	Percentage	Electoral votes
Republican	George W. Bush	Dick Cheney	1,437,490	52.47%	13
Democratic	Al Gore	Joe Lieberman	1,217,290	44.44%	0
Green	Ralph Nader	Winona LaDuke	59,398	2.17%	0
Libertarian	Harry Browne	Art Olivier	15,198	0.55%	0
Reform	Pat Buchanan	Ezola Foster	5,455	0.20%	0
Constitution	Howard Phillips	Curtis Frazier	1,809	0.07%	0
Write-ins	Write-ins	-	2,807	0.10%	0
Totals			2,739,447	100.00%	13
Voter turnout			???		—

==== By city and county ====
County/city	George W. Bush Republican		Al Gore Democratic		Ralph Nader Green		Harry Browne Libertarian		Various candidates Other parties		Margin		Total votes
County/city	#	%	#	%	#	%	#	%	#	%	#	%	Total votes
Accomack	6,352	53.27%	5,092	42.70%	220	1.84%	188	1.58%	73	0.61%	1,260	10.57%	11,925
Albemarle	18,291	49.64%	16,255	44.12%	2,043	5.54%	167	0.45%	90	0.24%	2,036	5.52%	36,846
Alexandria	19,043	34.50%	33,633	60.93%	2,094	3.79%	223	0.40%	206	0.37%	-14,590	-26.43%	55,199
Alleghany	2,808	54.81%	2,214	43.22%	62	1.21%	25	0.49%	14	0.27%	594	11.59%	5,123
Amelia	2,947	61.55%	1,754	36.63%	40	0.84%	24	0.50%	23	0.48%	1,193	24.92%	4,788
Amherst	6,660	56.86%	4,812	41.09%	135	1.15%	67	0.57%	38	0.32%	1,848	15.77%	11,712
Appomattox	3,654	61.65%	2,132	35.97%	62	1.05%	60	1.01%	19	0.32%	1,522	25.68%	5,927
Arlington	28,555	34.17%	50,260	60.15%	3,952	4.73%	463	0.55%	329	0.39%	-21,705	-25.98%	83,559
Augusta	17,744	70.21%	6,643	26.29%	527	2.09%	269	1.06%	88	0.35%	11,101	43.92%	25,271
Bath	1,311	59.32%	822	37.19%	35	1.58%	27	1.22%	15	0.68%	489	22.13%	2,210
Bedford	17,224	65.87%	8,160	31.21%	376	1.44%	268	1.02%	121	0.46%	9,064	34.66%	26,149
Bedford City	1,269	51.99%	1,078	44.16%	38	1.56%	35	1.43%	21	0.86%	191	7.83%	2,441
Bland	1,759	65.44%	851	31.66%	42	1.56%	20	0.74%	16	0.60%	908	33.78%	2,688
Botetourt	8,867	64.07%	4,627	33.43%	207	1.50%	88	0.64%	51	0.37%	4,240	30.64%	13,840
Bristol	3,495	55.66%	2,646	42.14%	89	1.42%	20	0.32%	29	0.46%	849	13.52%	6,279
Brunswick	2,561	42.70%	3,387	56.48%	28	0.47%	13	0.22%	8	0.13%	-826	-13.78%	5,997
Buchanan	3,867	39.23%	5,745	58.29%	65	0.66%	132	1.34%	47	0.48%	-1,878	-19.06%	9,856
Buckingham	2,738	50.20%	2,561	46.96%	96	1.76%	39	0.72%	20	0.37%	177	3.24%	5,454
Buena Vista	980	49.62%	941	47.65%	27	1.37%	19	0.96%	8	0.41%	39	1.97%	1,975
Campbell	13,162	64.75%	6,659	32.76%	236	1.16%	199	0.98%	71	0.35%	6,503	31.99%	20,327
Caroline	3,873	46.38%	4,314	51.66%	102	1.22%	38	0.46%	24	0.29%	-441	-5.28%	8,351
Carroll	7,142	64.92%	3,638	33.07%	126	1.15%	52	0.47%	43	0.39%	3,504	31.85%	11,001
Charles City	1,023	33.37%	1,981	64.61%	31	1.01%	19	0.62%	12	0.39%	-958	-31.24%	3,066
Charlotte	2,855	57.17%	2,017	40.39%	43	0.86%	46	0.92%	33	0.66%	838	16.78%	4,994
Charlottesville	4,034	30.51%	7,762	58.70%	1,196	9.04%	111	0.84%	121	0.92%	-3,728	-28.19%	13,224
Chesapeake	39,684	53.21%	33,578	45.02%	732	0.98%	322	0.43%	269	0.36%	6,106	8.19%	74,585
Chesterfield	69,924	63.02%	38,638	34.82%	1,646	1.48%	335	0.30%	408	0.37%	31,286	28.20%	110,951
Clarke	2,883	54.56%	2,166	40.99%	195	3.69%	19	0.36%	21	0.40%	717	13.57%	5,284
Clifton Forge	613	40.01%	868	56.66%	25	1.63%	20	1.31%	6	0.39%	-255	-16.65%	1,532
Colonial Heights	5,519	70.92%	2,100	26.99%	123	1.58%	19	0.24%	21	0.27%	3,419	43.93%	7,782
Covington	966	43.63%	1,168	52.76%	24	1.08%	40	1.81%	16	0.72%	-202	-9.13%	2,214
Craig	1,580	63.38%	851	34.14%	39	1.56%	14	0.56%	9	0.36%	729	29.24%	2,493
Culpeper	7,440	60.76%	4,364	35.64%	253	2.07%	137	1.12%	50	0.41%	3,076	25.12%	12,244
Cumberland	1,974	56.29%	1,405	40.06%	35	1.00%	75	2.14%	18	0.51%	569	16.23%	3,507
Danville	9,427	51.49%	8,221	44.91%	168	0.92%	437	2.39%	54	0.29%	1,206	6.58%	18,307
Dickenson	3,122	43.21%	3,951	54.68%	85	1.18%	37	0.51%	31	0.43%	-829	-11.47%	7,226
Dinwiddie	4,959	54.28%	4,001	43.79%	74	0.81%	58	0.63%	44	0.48%	958	10.49%	9,136
Emporia	938	45.10%	1,116	53.65%	17	0.82%	4	0.19%	5	0.24%	-178	-8.55%	2,080
Essex	1,995	52.08%	1,750	45.68%	59	1.54%	19	0.50%	8	0.21%	245	6.40%	3,831
Fairfax	202,181	48.86%	196,501	47.49%	12,201	2.95%	1,546	0.37%	1,346	0.33%	5,680	1.37%	413,775
Fairfax City	4,762	49.83%	4,361	45.64%	352	3.68%	39	0.41%	42	0.44%	401	4.19%	9,556
Falls Church	2,131	38.10%	3,109	55.59%	285	5.10%	38	0.68%	30	0.54%	-978	-17.49%	5,593
Fauquier	14,456	61.56%	8,296	35.33%	570	2.43%	60	0.26%	99	0.42%	6,160	26.23%	23,481
Floyd	3,423	59.64%	1,957	34.10%	244	4.25%	48	0.84%	67	1.17%	1,466	25.54%	5,739
Fluvanna	4,962	57.00%	3,431	39.41%	252	2.89%	38	0.44%	23	0.26%	1,531	17.59%	8,706
Franklin	11,225	59.62%	7,145	37.95%	303	1.61%	87	0.46%	69	0.37%	4,080	21.67%	18,829
Franklin City	1,393	43.65%	1,763	55.25%	25	0.78%	8	0.25%	2	0.06%	-370	-11.60%	3,191
Frederick	14,574	65.09%	7,158	31.97%	483	2.16%	80	0.36%	97	0.43%	7,416	33.12%	22,392
Fredericksburg	2,935	43.93%	3,360	50.29%	326	4.88%	36	0.54%	24	0.36%	-425	-6.36%	6,681
Galax	1,160	52.42%	996	45.01%	42	1.90%	5	0.23%	10	0.45%	164	7.41%	2,213
Giles	3,574	52.40%	3,004	44.05%	137	2.01%	70	1.03%	35	0.51%	570	8.35%	6,820
Gloucester	8,718	63.64%	4,553	33.24%	225	1.64%	148	1.08%	55	0.40%	4,165	30.40%	13,699
Goochland	5,378	61.27%	3,197	36.42%	139	1.58%	42	0.48%	21	0.24%	2,181	24.85%	8,777
Grayson	4,236	61.82%	2,467	36.00%	102	1.49%	15	0.22%	32	0.47%	1,769	25.82%	6,852
Greene	3,375	62.36%	1,774	32.78%	194	3.58%	50	0.92%	19	0.35%	1,601	29.58%	5,412
Greensville	1,565	40.07%	2,314	59.24%	13	0.33%	4	0.10%	10	0.26%	-749	-19.17%	3,906
Halifax	7,732	54.95%	5,963	42.37%	110	0.78%	211	1.50%	56	0.40%	1,769	12.58%	14,072
Hampton	19,561	40.85%	27,490	57.41%	563	1.18%	154	0.32%	119	0.25%	-7,929	-16.56%	47,887
Hanover	28,614	68.81%	12,044	28.96%	711	1.71%	117	0.28%	99	0.24%	16,570	39.85%	41,585
Harrisonburg	5,741	57.65%	3,482	34.97%	641	6.44%	45	0.45%	49	0.49%	2,259	22.68%	9,958
Henrico	62,887	55.04%	48,645	42.58%	1,893	1.66%	367	0.32%	460	0.40%	14,242	12.46%	114,252
Henry	11,870	55.30%	8,898	41.46%	234	1.09%	331	1.54%	130	0.61%	2,972	13.84%	21,463
Highland	942	65.55%	453	31.52%	32	2.23%	4	0.28%	6	0.42%	489	34.03%	1,437
Hopewell	3,749	53.73%	3,024	43.34%	73	1.05%	92	1.32%	40	0.57%	725	10.39%	6,978
Isle of Wight	7,587	58.59%	5,162	39.86%	123	0.95%	51	0.39%	27	0.21%	2,425	18.73%	12,950
James City	14,628	59.73%	9,090	37.11%	639	2.61%	94	0.38%	41	0.17%	5,538	22.62%	24,492
King and Queen	1,423	49.77%	1,387	48.51%	33	1.15%	11	0.38%	5	0.17%	36	1.26%	2,859
King George	3,590	61.35%	2,070	35.37%	132	2.26%	31	0.53%	29	0.50%	1,520	25.98%	5,852
King William	3,547	61.48%	2,125	36.83%	74	1.28%	9	0.16%	14	0.24%	1,422	24.65%	5,769
Lancaster	3,411	62.53%	1,937	35.51%	88	1.61%	14	0.26%	5	0.09%	1,474	27.02%	5,455
Lee	4,551	52.02%	4,031	46.08%	79	0.90%	34	0.39%	53	0.61%	520	5.94%	8,748
Lexington	957	44.72%	1,048	48.97%	103	4.81%	26	1.21%	6	0.28%	-91	-4.25%	2,140
Loudoun	42,453	56.12%	30,938	40.89%	1,665	2.20%	276	0.36%	321	0.42%	11,515	15.23%	75,653
Louisa	5,461	54.09%	4,309	42.68%	222	2.20%	44	0.44%	60	0.59%	1,152	11.41%	10,096
Lunenburg	2,510	54.67%	2,026	44.13%	33	0.72%	16	0.35%	6	0.13%	484	10.54%	4,591
Lynchburg	12,518	53.25%	10,374	44.13%	441	1.88%	105	0.45%	68	0.29%	2,144	9.12%	23,506
Madison	2,940	58.48%	1,844	36.68%	148	2.94%	67	1.33%	28	0.56%	1,096	21.80%	5,027
Manassas	6,752	54.41%	5,262	42.40%	230	1.85%	93	0.75%	73	0.59%	1,490	12.01%	12,410
Manassas Park	1,460	56.59%	1,048	40.62%	51	1.98%	9	0.35%	12	0.47%	412	15.97%	2,580
Martinsville	2,560	44.96%	3,048	53.53%	59	1.04%	12	0.21%	15	0.26%	-488	-8.57%	5,694
Mathews	2,951	64.03%	1,499	32.52%	88	1.91%	54	1.17%	17	0.37%	1,452	31.51%	4,609
Mecklenburg	6,600	56.63%	4,797	41.16%	104	0.89%	96	0.82%	57	0.49%	1,803	15.47%	11,654
Middlesex	2,844	60.65%	1,671	35.64%	84	1.79%	66	1.41%	24	0.51%	1,173	25.01%	4,689
Montgomery	13,991	51.51%	11,720	43.15%	1,222	4.50%	149	0.55%	78	0.29%	2,271	8.36%	27,160
Nelson	2,913	47.40%	2,907	47.31%	273	4.44%	27	0.44%	25	0.41%	6	0.09%	6,145
New Kent	3,934	64.34%	2,055	33.61%	81	1.32%	20	0.33%	24	0.39%	1,879	30.73%	6,114
Newport News	27,006	46.70%	29,779	51.50%	722	1.25%	212	0.37%	106	0.18%	-2,773	-4.80%	57,825
Norfolk	21,920	35.39%	38,221	61.70%	1,153	1.86%	364	0.59%	288	0.46%	-16,301	-26.31%	61,946
Northampton	2,299	47.00%	2,340	47.83%	108	2.21%	121	2.47%	24	0.49%	-41	-0.83%	4,892
Northumberland	3,362	59.98%	2,118	37.79%	97	1.73%	11	0.20%	17	0.30%	1,244	22.19%	5,605
Norton	639	41.76%	867	56.67%	20	1.31%	2	0.13%	2	0.13%	-228	-14.91%	1,530
Nottoway	2,870	52.26%	2,460	44.79%	46	0.84%	98	1.78%	18	0.33%	410	7.47%	5,492
Orange	5,991	57.15%	4,126	39.36%	236	2.25%	91	0.87%	39	0.37%	1,865	17.79%	10,483
Page	5,089	63.64%	2,726	34.09%	143	1.79%	15	0.19%	23	0.29%	2,363	29.55%	7,996
Patrick	4,901	66.36%	2,254	30.52%	101	1.37%	86	1.16%	43	0.58%	2,647	35.84%	7,385
Petersburg	2,109	19.07%	8,751	79.11%	117	1.06%	49	0.44%	36	0.33%	-6,642	-60.04%	11,062
Pittsylvania	15,760	64.98%	7,834	32.30%	207	0.85%	374	1.54%	80	0.33%	7,926	32.68%	24,255
Poquoson	4,271	72.87%	1,448	24.71%	93	1.59%	41	0.70%	8	0.14%	2,823	48.16%	5,861
Portsmouth	12,628	35.62%	22,286	62.86%	348	0.98%	126	0.36%	67	0.19%	-9,658	-27.24%	35,455
Powhatan	6,820	70.23%	2,708	27.89%	122	1.26%	36	0.37%	25	0.26%	4,112	42.34%	9,711
Prince Edward	3,214	50.51%	2,922	45.92%	115	1.81%	94	1.48%	18	0.28%	292	4.59%	6,363
Prince George	6,579	60.36%	4,182	38.37%	97	0.89%	19	0.17%	23	0.21%	2,397	21.99%	10,900
Prince William	52,788	52.52%	44,745	44.52%	1,927	1.92%	695	0.69%	356	0.35%	8,043	8.00%	100,511
Pulaski	7,089	55.83%	5,255	41.39%	207	1.63%	86	0.68%	60	0.47%	1,834	14.44%	12,697
Radford	2,190	49.24%	2,063	46.38%	172	3.87%	16	0.36%	7	0.16%	127	2.86%	4,448
Rappahannock	1,850	52.66%	1,462	41.62%	161	4.58%	18	0.51%	22	0.63%	388	11.04%	3,513
Richmond	1,784	60.50%	1,076	36.49%	44	1.49%	24	0.81%	21	0.71%	708	24.01%	2,949
Richmond City	20,265	30.74%	42,717	64.80%	2,425	3.68%	357	0.54%	162	0.25%	-22,452	-34.06%	65,926
Roanoke	25,740	60.12%	16,141	37.70%	681	1.59%	169	0.39%	86	0.20%	9,599	22.42%	42,817
Roanoke City	14,630	43.75%	17,920	53.59%	603	1.80%	202	0.60%	87	0.26%	-3,290	-9.84%	33,442
Rockbridge	4,522	57.77%	2,953	37.73%	248	3.17%	65	0.83%	39	0.50%	1,569	20.04%	7,827
Rockingham	17,482	72.86%	5,834	24.31%	539	2.25%	53	0.22%	86	0.36%	11,648	48.55%	23,994
Russell	5,065	46.93%	5,442	50.43%	102	0.95%	123	1.14%	60	0.56%	-377	-3.50%	10,792
Salem	6,188	57.46%	4,348	40.37%	181	1.68%	31	0.29%	22	0.20%	1,840	17.09%	10,770
Scott	5,535	59.29%	3,552	38.05%	85	0.91%	114	1.22%	49	0.52%	1,983	21.24%	9,335
Shenandoah	9,636	66.68%	4,420	30.58%	294	2.03%	37	0.26%	65	0.45%	5,216	36.10%	14,452
Smyth	6,580	56.05%	4,836	41.19%	131	1.12%	116	0.99%	77	0.66%	1,744	14.86%	11,740
Southampton	3,293	49.05%	3,359	50.03%	44	0.66%	4	0.06%	14	0.21%	-66	-0.98%	6,714
Spotsylvania	20,739	59.22%	13,455	38.42%	586	1.67%	94	0.27%	147	0.42%	7,284	20.80%	35,021
Stafford	20,731	60.54%	12,596	36.78%	657	1.92%	120	0.35%	142	0.41%	8,135	23.76%	34,246
Staunton	4,878	57.29%	3,324	39.04%	278	3.27%	18	0.21%	16	0.19%	1,554	18.25%	8,514
Suffolk	11,836	47.99%	12,471	50.57%	199	0.81%	96	0.39%	59	0.24%	-635	-2.58%	24,661
Surry	1,313	40.65%	1,845	57.12%	29	0.90%	30	0.93%	13	0.40%	-532	-16.47%	3,230
Sussex	1,745	44.67%	2,006	51.36%	41	1.05%	83	2.12%	31	0.79%	-261	-6.69%	3,906
Tazewell	8,655	52.96%	7,227	44.22%	162	0.99%	217	1.33%	83	0.51%	1,428	8.74%	16,344
Virginia Beach	83,674	55.87%	62,268	41.58%	2,370	1.58%	809	0.54%	650	0.43%	21,406	14.29%	149,771
Warren	6,335	56.73%	4,313	38.63%	260	2.33%	124	1.11%	134	1.20%	2,022	18.10%	11,166
Washington	12,064	59.66%	7,549	37.33%	288	1.42%	232	1.15%	89	0.44%	4,515	22.33%	20,222
Waynesboro	4,084	57.50%	2,737	38.54%	233	3.28%	22	0.31%	26	0.37%	1,347	18.96%	7,102
Westmoreland	2,932	48.66%	2,922	48.49%	88	1.46%	59	0.98%	25	0.41%	10	0.17%	6,026
Williamsburg	1,777	47.70%	1,724	46.28%	188	5.05%	21	0.56%	15	0.40%	53	1.42%	3,725
Winchester	4,314	54.70%	3,318	42.07%	209	2.65%	27	0.34%	18	0.23%	996	12.63%	7,886
Wise	6,504	48.87%	6,412	48.17%	160	1.20%	180	1.35%	54	0.41%	92	0.70%	13,310
Wythe	6,539	63.95%	3,462	33.86%	132	1.29%	16	0.16%	76	0.74%	3,077	30.09%	10,225
York	15,312	62.29%	8,622	35.07%	480	1.95%	114	0.46%	55	0.22%	6,690	27.22%	24,583
Totals	1,437,490	52.47%	1,217,290	44.44%	59,398	2.17%	15,198	0.55%	10,071	0.37%	220,200	8.03%	2,739,447

===== Counties and independent cities that flipped from Democratic to Republican =====
- Accomack (largest city: Chincoteague)
- Alleghany (largest city: Clifton Forge)
- Bath (largest city: Hot Springs)
- Bedford (independent city)
- Buckingham (largest city: Dillwyn)
- Buena Vista (independent city)
- Dinwiddie (largest town: McKenney)
- Essex (largest city: Tappahannock)
- Galax (independent city)
- Giles (largest city: Pearisburg)
- King and Queen (largest CDP: King and Queen Courthouse)
- Lee (largest city: Pennington Gap)
- Montgomery (largest city: Blacksburg)
- Nelson (largest city: Nellysford)
- Prince Edward (largest city: Farmville)
- Radford (independent city)
- Smyth (largest city: Marion)
- Tazewell (largest city: Richlands)
- Westmoreland (largest city: Colonial Beach)
- Williamsburg (independent city)
- Wise (largest city: Big Stone Gap)

==== By congressional district ====
Bush won eight of 11 congressional districts, including two held by other parties. Gore won three districts, including one held by a Republican.

District	Bush	Gore	Representative
1st	58%	39%	Herb Bateman
1st	58%	39%	Jo Ann Davis
2nd	53%	45%	Owen Pickett
2nd	53%	45%	Ed Schrock
3rd	32%	65%	Bobby Scott
4th	49.2%	49.0%	Norman Sisisky
5th	56%	40%	Virgil Goode
6th	58%	39%	Bob Goodlatte
7th	62%	35%	Tom Bliley
7th	62%	35%	Eric Cantor
8th	40%	55%	Jim Moran
9th	55%	42%	Rick Boucher
10th	58%	39%	Frank Wolf
11th	47%	49%	Tom Davis
