= 1900 United States presidential election in Virginia =

- November 6, 1900

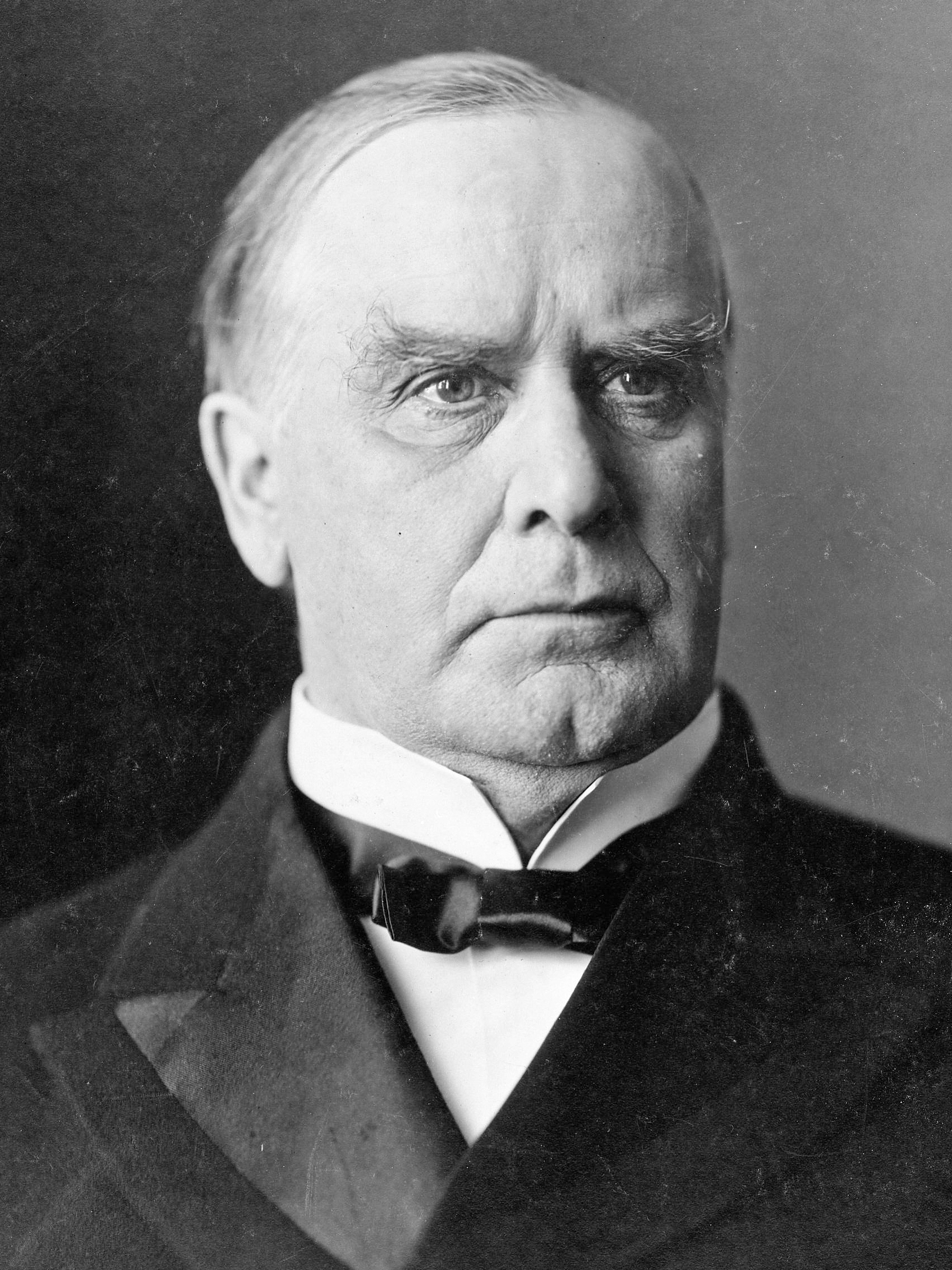
Nominee	William Jennings Bryan	William McKinley
Party	Democratic	Republican
Home state	Nebraska	Ohio
Running mate	Adlai Stevenson I	Theodore Roosevelt
Electoral vote	12	0
Popular vote	146,079	115,769
Percentage	55.29%	43.82%
County and independent city results
Bryan
40–50%
50–60%
60–70%
70–80%
McKinley
40–50%
50–60%
60–70%
70–80%
President before election
William McKinley
Republican
Elected President
William McKinley
Republican

The 1900 United States presidential election in Virginia took place on November 6, 1900, as part of the 1900 United States presidential election. Voters chose 12 representatives, or electors to the Electoral College, who voted for president and vice president.

Following the state's delayed readmission to the Union, Virginia was unique among ex-Confederate states in not having a period of Republican control during Reconstruction, due to the failure of the Underwood Constitution to pass in 1868 and the consequent support for the Conservative Party that fused prewar Democrats and Whigs in the first postwar elections and consistently controlled the state legislature after readmission. From 1879, however, a fusion with the “Readjuster” faction of the state Democratic Party would revitalize the Republicans until 1883, although the state GOP would remain competitive in statewide elections, only narrowly failing to carry the state in 1888, until the Cleveland Administration eliminated federal oversight while the Walton Act created the secret ballot and began large-scale black disenfranchisement.

However, despite its dominant position, the Democratic Party would become deeply divided between the conservative Gold Democrats of a state whose economy was already substantially influenced by the rapidly industrializing Northeast, and a Populist-influenced faction centered in the state's rural areas. Many Virginia farmers still depended upon a tobacco monoculture and had been affected severely by consistently declining prices, poor harvests and the evolving rift between growing Northern and Southwest Virginia which were deeply tied culturally to the border states, and the declining, agrarian Southside. This divide strengthened a now “lily-white” Jim Crow state Republican Party in the 1896 election cycle, as the old Whig minority in Southwest Virginia was less attached to party labels and strongly supported Republican William McKinley. Consequently, Southwest Virginia would become the GOP's stronghold in the state during the first half of the twentieth century, allowing it to remain more viable than in any other ex-Confederate state other than North Carolina and Tennessee where extremely loyal Unionist Republicanism remained.

Neither candidate campaigned in the state, which had voted Democratic at every election since 1876. In October, it was generally thought that Bryan would be sure to carry the state, and unlike in 1896, even pro-Republican journalists did not believe McKinley possessed any chance.

Virginia voted for the Democratic candidate, former U.S. Representative William Jennings Bryan over the Republican candidate, incumbent President William McKinley. Bryan won the state by a margin of 11.47 percentage points. McKinley was the last Republican until Donald Trump in 2024 to win two terms in the White House without carrying Virginia either time.

Along with having defeated McKinley in Virginia four years earlier, Bryan would later win the state again in 1908 against William Howard Taft.

== Results ==
1900 United States presidential election in Virginia
Party	Candidate	Votes	Percentage	Electoral votes
Democratic	William Jennings Bryan	146,079	55.29%	12
Republican	William McKinley (inc.)	115,769	43.82%	0
Prohibition	John G. Woolley	2,130	0.81%	0
Socialist Labor	Joseph F. Maloney	167	0.06%	0
Populist	Wharton Barker	63	0.02%	0
Totals		264,208	100.0%	12

=== Results by county ===
1900 United States presidential election in Virginia by counties and independent cities
County or Independent City	William Jennings Bryan Democratic		William McKinley Republican		John G. Woolley Prohibition		Other candidates Various parties		Margin		Total votes cast
County or Independent City	#	%	#	%	#	%	#	%	#	%	Total votes cast
Accomack County	3,210	67.72%	1,460	30.80%	69	1.46%	1	0.02%	1,750	36.92%	4,740
Albemarle County	2,411	58.73%	1,674	40.78%	20	0.49%	0	0.00%	737	17.95%	4,105
Alexandria County	413	49.40%	421	50.36%	37	1.59%	0	0.00%	-8	-0.96%	836
Alleghany County	841	36.11%	1,451	62.30%	12	0.82%	14	0.95%	-610	-26.19%	2,329
Amelia County	608	41.30%	838	56.93%	4	0.16%	18	0.71%	-230	-15.63%	1,472
Amherst County	1,516	59.97%	990	39.16%	5	0.32%	3	0.19%	526	20.81%	2,528
Appomattox County	1,082	69.94%	457	29.54%	2	0.24%	0	0.00%	625	40.40%	1,547
Augusta County	2,869	51.87%	2,473	44.71%	185	3.34%	4	0.07%	396	7.16%	5,531
Bath County	422	47.90%	454	51.53%	5	0.57%	0	0.00%	-32	-3.63%	881
Bedford County	2,535	55.08%	1,982	43.07%	84	1.83%	1	0.02%	553	12.02%	4,602
Bland County	513	52.29%	465	47.40%	3	0.31%	0	0.00%	48	4.89%	981
Botetourt County	1,382	50.51%	1,329	48.57%	25	0.91%	0	0.00%	53	1.94%	2,736
Brunswick County	1,064	47.37%	1,177	52.40%	5	0.22%	0	0.00%	-113	-5.03%	2,246
Buchanan County	587	45.82%	694	54.18%	0	0.00%	0	0.00%	-107	-8.35%	1,281
Buckingham County	942	50.16%	922	49.09%	14	0.75%	0	0.00%	20	1.06%	1,878
Campbell County	1,339	50.82%	1,288	48.88%	7	0.27%	1	0.04%	51	1.94%	2,635
Caroline County	1,077	48.19%	1,144	51.19%	14	0.63%	0	0.00%	-67	-3.00%	2,235
Carroll County	1,434	44.77%	1,759	54.92%	9	0.28%	1	0.03%	-325	-10.15%	3,203
Charlotte County	1,011	75.67%	323	24.18%	2	0.15%	0	0.00%	688	51.50%	1,336
Chesterfield County	1,368	60.11%	884	38.84%	22	0.97%	2	0.09%	484	21.27%	2,276
Clarke County	1,055	69.73%	426	28.16%	30	1.98%	2	0.13%	629	41.57%	1,513
Craig County	415	57.80%	265	36.91%	38	5.29%	0	0.00%	150	20.89%	718
Culpeper County	1,512	64.07%	847	35.89%	1	0.04%	0	0.00%	665	28.18%	2,360
Cumberland County	537	71.70%	205	27.37%	1	0.13%	6	0.80%	332	44.33%	749
Dickenson County	727	51.56%	683	48.44%	0	0.00%	0	0.00%	44	3.12%	1,410
Dinwiddie County	990	62.66%	583	36.90%	6	0.38%	1	0.06%	407	25.76%	1,580
Elizabeth City County	1,027	59.09%	697	40.10%	8	0.46%	6	0.35%	330	18.99%	1,738
Essex County	731	55.30%	590	44.63%	1	0.08%	0	0.00%	141	10.67%	1,322
Fairfax County	2,135	58.40%	1,507	41.22%	14	0.38%	0	0.00%	628	17.18%	3,656
Fauquier County	2,610	65.30%	1,377	34.45%	8	0.20%	2	0.05%	1,233	30.85%	3,997
Floyd County	648	29.22%	1,566	70.60%	4	0.18%	0	0.00%	-918	-41.39%	2,218
Fluvanna County	790	53.34%	678	45.78%	13	0.88%	0	0.00%	112	7.56%	1,481
Franklin County	1,785	50.72%	1,702	48.37%	24	0.68%	8	0.23%	83	2.36%	3,519
Frederick County	1,748	71.52%	671	27.45%	21	0.86%	4	0.16%	1,077	44.07%	2,444
Giles County	1,010	53.05%	858	45.06%	36	1.89%	0	0.00%	152	7.98%	1,904
Gloucester County	484	57.69%	354	42.19%	1	0.12%	0	0.00%	130	15.49%	839
Goochland County	602	40.73%	876	59.27%	0	0.00%	0	0.00%	-274	-18.54%	1,478
Grayson County	1,252	44.10%	1,585	55.83%	2	0.07%	0	0.00%	-333	-11.73%	2,839
Greene County	511	52.68%	459	47.32%	0	0.00%	0	0.00%	52	5.36%	970
Greensville County	740	57.14%	547	42.24%	4	0.31%	4	0.31%	193	14.90%	1,295
Halifax County	2,864	63.00%	1,632	35.90%	45	0.99%	5	0.11%	1,232	27.10%	4,546
Hanover County	1,203	49.75%	1,201	49.67%	14	0.58%	0	0.00%	2	0.08%	2,418
Henrico County	2,189	66.51%	1,049	31.87%	25	0.76%	28	0.85%	1,140	34.64%	3,291
Henry County	1,356	49.49%	1,367	49.89%	17	0.62%	0	0.00%	-11	-0.40%	2,740
Highland County	512	48.08%	540	50.70%	11	1.03%	2	0.19%	-28	-2.63%	1,065
Isle of Wight County	1,206	61.22%	763	38.73%	0	0.00%	1	0.05%	443	22.49%	1,970
James City County	294	53.45%	255	46.36%	1	0.18%	0	0.00%	39	7.09%	550
King and Queen County	796	56.37%	614	43.48%	2	0.14%	0	0.00%	182	12.89%	1,412
King George County	480	42.67%	643	57.16%	2	0.18%	0	0.00%	-163	-14.49%	1,125
King William County	462	34.38%	871	64.81%	8	0.60%	3	0.22%	-409	-30.43%	1,344
Lancaster County	971	65.34%	508	34.19%	7	0.47%	0	0.00%	463	31.16%	1,486
Lee County	1,493	51.61%	1,392	48.12%	6	0.21%	2	0.07%	101	3.49%	2,893
Loudoun County	2,690	59.79%	1,684	37.43%	119	2.65%	6	0.13%	1,006	22.36%	4,499
Louisa County	1,169	49.16%	1,187	49.92%	22	0.93%	0	0.00%	-18	-0.76%	2,378
Lunenburg County	634	64.83%	343	35.07%	9	0.91%	0	0.00%	291	29.75%	978
Madison County	986	59.76%	664	40.24%	14	0.84%	0	0.00%	322	19.52%	1,650
Mathews County	726	68.88%	294	27.89%	40	3.77%	0	0.00%	432	40.99%	1,054
Mecklenburg County	1,697	47.24%	1,855	51.64%	4	0.11%	36	1.00%	-158	-4.40%	3,592
Middlesex County	686	51.58%	640	48.12%	56	4.05%	0	0.00%	46	3.46%	1,330
Montgomery County	1,102	42.58%	1,391	53.75%	5	0.19%	90	3.48%	-289	-11.17%	2,588
Nansemond County	1,481	59.74%	992	40.02%	12	0.48%	0	0.00%	489	19.73%	2,479
Nelson County	1,530	56.52%	1,163	42.96%	4	0.15%	10	0.37%	367	13.56%	2,707
New Kent County	282	38.42%	447	60.90%	1	0.14%	4	0.54%	-165	-22.48%	734
Norfolk County	2,415	44.36%	3,024	55.55%	5	0.09%	0	0.00%	-609	-11.19%	5,444
Northampton County	1,180	56.43%	896	42.85%	12	0.57%	3	0.14%	284	13.58%	2,091
Northumberland County	809	49.85%	807	49.72%	7	0.43%	0	0.00%	2	0.12%	1,623
Nottoway County	1,076	68.14%	489	30.97%	13	0.82%	1	0.06%	587	37.18%	1,579
Orange County	1,100	53.71%	929	45.36%	19	0.93%	0	0.00%	171	8.35%	2,048
Page County	1,041	45.64%	1,214	53.22%	26	1.14%	0	0.00%	-173	-7.58%	2,281
Patrick County	1,026	44.32%	1,281	55.33%	8	0.35%	0	0.00%	-255	-11.02%	2,315
Pittsylvania County	3,758	61.16%	2,328	37.88%	59	0.96%	0	0.00%	1,430	23.27%	6,145
Powhatan County	458	44.00%	582	55.91%	1	0.10%	0	0.00%	-124	-11.91%	1,041
Prince Edward County	843	59.49%	574	40.51%	0	0.00%	0	0.00%	269	18.98%	1,417
Prince George County	367	54.86%	301	44.99%	0	0.00%	1	0.15%	66	9.87%	669
Prince William County	1,351	66.52%	680	33.48%	0	0.00%	0	0.00%	671	33.04%	2,031
Princess Anne County	743	69.31%	327	30.50%	2	0.19%	0	0.00%	416	38.81%	1,072
Pulaski County	1,048	45.74%	1,243	54.26%	0	0.00%	0	0.00%	-195	-8.51%	2,291
Rappahannock County	813	61.27%	507	38.21%	7	0.53%	0	0.00%	306	23.06%	1,327
Richmond County	692	54.49%	574	45.20%	3	0.24%	1	0.08%	118	9.29%	1,270
Roanoke County	942	42.95%	1,188	54.17%	58	2.64%	5	0.23%	-246	-11.22%	2,193
Rockbridge County	1,658	42.46%	2,223	56.93%	22	0.56%	2	0.05%	-565	-14.47%	3,905
Rockingham County	2,852	51.60%	2,572	46.54%	103	1.86%	0	0.00%	280	5.07%	5,527
Russell County	1,956	58.58%	1,377	41.24%	6	0.18%	0	0.00%	579	17.34%	3,339
Scott County	1,813	52.17%	1,659	47.74%	3	0.09%	0	0.00%	154	4.43%	3,475
Shenandoah County	1,965	50.75%	1,862	48.09%	40	1.03%	5	0.13%	103	2.66%	3,872
Smyth County	1,252	40.94%	1,794	58.67%	12	0.39%	0	0.00%	-542	-17.72%	3,058
Southampton County	1,708	73.21%	610	26.15%	15	0.64%	0	0.00%	1,098	47.06%	2,333
Spotsylvania County	774	48.50%	817	51.19%	5	0.31%	0	0.00%	-43	-2.69%	1,596
Stafford County	648	42.74%	867	57.19%	1	0.07%	0	0.00%	-219	-14.45%	1,516
Surry County	839	62.85%	473	35.43%	22	1.65%	1	0.07%	366	27.42%	1,335
Sussex County	733	62.70%	430	36.78%	1	0.09%	5	0.43%	303	25.92%	1,169
Tazewell County	1,312	32.93%	2,663	66.84%	8	0.20%	1	0.03%	-1,351	-33.91%	3,984
Warren County	1,068	68.95%	462	29.83%	19	1.23%	0	0.00%	606	39.12%	1,549
Warwick County	526	61.02%	336	38.98%	0	0.00%	0	0.00%	190	22.04%	862
Washington County	2,291	47.74%	2,498	52.05%	10	0.21%	0	0.00%	-207	-4.31%	4,799
Westmoreland County	691	53.19%	597	45.96%	10	0.77%	1	0.08%	94	7.24%	1,299
Wise County	1,215	41.10%	1,725	58.36%	15	0.51%	1	0.03%	-510	-17.25%	2,956
Wythe County	1,607	45.31%	1,932	54.47%	6	0.17%	2	0.06%	-325	-9.16%	3,547
York County	551	45.84%	631	52.50%	0	0.00%	20	1.66%	-80	-6.66%	1,202
Alexandria City	2,003	68.04%	935	31.76%	6	0.20%	0	0.00%	1,068	36.28%	2,944
Bristol City	787	72.80%	281	25.99%	13	1.20%	0	0.00%	506	46.81%	1,081
Buena Vista City	215	50.47%	204	47.89%	5	1.17%	2	0.47%	11	2.58%	426
Charlottesville City	731	66.15%	361	32.67%	11	1.00%	2	0.18%	370	33.48%	1,105
Danville City	1,575	79.83%	310	15.71%	87	4.41%	1	0.05%	1,265	64.12%	1,973
Fredericksburg City	587	62.18%	353	37.39%	3	0.32%	1	0.11%	234	24.79%	944
Lynchburg City	1,081	61.67%	660	37.65%	0	0.00%	12	0.68%	421	24.02%	1,753
Manchester City	647	58.03%	442	39.64%	34	3.03%	0	0.00%	205	18.39%	1,115
Newport News City	1,896	62.23%	1,108	36.36%	15	0.49%	28	0.92%	788	25.86%	3,047
Norfolk City	3,883	62.17%	2,301	36.84%	39	0.62%	23	0.37%	1,582	25.33%	6,246
Petersburg City	1,589	69.33%	688	30.02%	9	0.39%	6	0.26%	901	39.31%	2,292
Portsmouth City	1,743	74.74%	566	24.27%	14	0.60%	9	0.39%	1,177	50.47%	2,332
Radford City	257	55.99%	197	42.92%	5	1.09%	0	0.00%	60	13.07%	459
Richmond City	6,095	68.35%	2,729	30.60%	71	0.80%	22	0.25%	3,366	37.75%	8,917
Roanoke City	1,761	58.98%	1,120	37.51%	53	1.77%	52	1.74%	641	21.47%	2,986
Staunton City	612	57.90%	375	35.48%	70	6.62%	0	0.00%	237	22.42%	1,057
Williamsburg City	161	62.89%	88	34.38%	7	2.73%	0	0.00%	73	28.52%	256
Winchester City	593	57.74%	423	41.19%	10	0.97%	1	0.10%	170	16.55%	1,027
Charles City County	0	N/A	0	N/A							
Totals	146,079	55.26%	115,769	43.79%	2,130	0.81%	473	0.18%	30,310	11.47%	264,357

== See also ==
- United States presidential elections in Virginia
