= 1896 United States presidential election in Virginia =

- November 3, 1896

Nominee	William Jennings Bryan	William McKinley
Party	Democratic	Republican
Home state	Nebraska	Ohio
Running mate	Arthur Sewall	Garret Hobart
Electoral vote	12	0
Popular vote	154,708	135,379
Percentage	52.50%	45.94%
County and independent city results
Bryan
40–50%
50–60%
60–70%
70–80%
McKinley
40–50%
50–60%
60–70%
70–80%
Tie
49.63% Bryan & McKinley
President before election
Grover Cleveland
Democratic
Elected President
William McKinley
Republican

The 1896 United States presidential election in Virginia took place on November 3, 1896, as part of the 1896 United States presidential election. Voters chose 12 representatives, or electors, to the Electoral College, who voted for president and vice president.

Following the state's delayed readmission to the Union, Virginia was unique among ex-Confederate states in not having a period of Republican control during Reconstruction, due to the failure of the Underwood Constitution to pass in 1868 and the consequent support for the Conservative Party that fused prewar Democrats and Whigs in the first postwar elections and consistently controlled the state legislature after readmission. From 1879, however, a fusion with the “Readjuster” faction of the state Democratic Party would revitalize the Republicans until 1883, although the state GOP would remain competitive in statewide elections, only narrowly failing to carry the state in 1888, until the Cleveland Administration eliminated federal oversight while the Walton Act created the secret ballot and began large-scale black disenfranchisement.

However, despite its dominant position, the Democratic Party was deeply divided between the conservative Gold Democrats of a state whose economy was already substantially influenced by the rapidly industrializing Northeast, and a Populist-influenced faction centered in the state's rural areas. Many Virginia farmers still depended upon a tobacco monoculture and had been affected severely by consistently declining prices, poor harvests and the evolving rift between growing Northern and Southwest Virginia which were deeply tied culturally to the border states, and the declining, agrarian Southside.

After the nomination of Nebraska congressman William Jennings Bryan on a free silver platform was confirmed in June, it became clear he would face opposition in Virginia's larger cities and towns, with the leader of this opposition being the Richmond Times under Bryan's namesake Joseph. At the beginning of the fall campaign Virginia was viewed as fairly secure for Bryan despite the defections that were expected to (and did) cost him the border states, and this opinion did not change as the campaign developed during October. Near the end, the state was heavily debated by politicians of opposing views on Bryan and Republican nominee, Ohio Governor William McKinley, some of whose supporters thought the GOP had a chance of carrying the state.

Virginia ultimately voted comfortably for Bryan over McKinley. Bryan won the state by a margin of 6.56 percentage points; however, McKinley did make major gains in developing Southwest Virginia, where he was the first-ever Republican victor in Botetourt, Buchanan, Carroll, Grayson, Greene, Pulaski, Shenandoah, Smyth and Washington Counties. Aided by the developing shift to a "lily-white" Jim Crow state Republican Party, this region and these counties would become the party's stronghold in Virginia during the first half of the twentieth century, allowing the party to remain more viable than in any other ex-Confederate state other than North Carolina and Tennessee where extremely loyal Unionist Republicanism remained.

Bryan would later win the state against McKinley again four years later and would later win the state again in 1908 against William Howard Taft.

== Results ==
1896 United States presidential election in Virginia
Party	Candidate	Votes	Percentage	Electoral votes
Democratic	William Jennings Bryan	154,708	52.50%	12
Republican	William McKinley	135,379	45.94%	0
Prohibition	Joshua Levering	2,350	0.80%	0
National Democratic	John M. Palmer	2,129	0.72%	0
Socialist Labor	Charles H. Matchett	108	0.04%	0
Totals		294,674	100.0%	12

=== Results by county ===
1896 United States presidential election in Virginia by counties and independent cities
County or independent city	William Jennings Bryan Democratic		William McKinley Republican		Joshua Levering Prohibition		John M. Palmer National Democratic		Charles H. Matchett Socialist Labor		Margin		Total votes cast
County or independent city	#	%	#	%	#	%	#	%	#	%	#	%	Total votes cast
Accomack County	3,115	62.25%	1,675	33.47%	186	3.72%	28	0.56%	1	0.02%	1,440	28.78%	5,004
Albemarle County	2,628	56.86%	1,918	41.50%	25	0.54%	51	1.10%	2	0.04%	710	15.36%	4,622
Alexandria County	322	30.99%	713	68.62%	2	0.19%	2	0.19%	0	0.00%	-391	-37.63%	1,039
Alleghany County	720	28.55%	1,711	67.84%	78	3.09%	13	0.52%	0	0.00%	-991	-39.29%	2,522
Amelia County	663	42.20%	899	57.22%	8	0.51%	1	0.06%	1	0.06%	-236	-15.02%	1,571
Amherst County	1,751	59.26%	1,190	40.27%	4	0.14%	10	0.34%	6	0.20%	561	18.98%	2,955
Appomattox County	946	60.76%	598	38.41%	8	0.51%	5	0.32%	0	0.00%	348	22.35%	1,557
Augusta County	3,066	50.12%	2,823	46.15%	194	3.17%	34	0.56%	2	0.03%	243	3.97%	6,117
Bath County	508	51.42%	471	47.67%	3	0.30%	6	0.61%	0	0.00%	37	3.74%	988
Bedford County	3,085	57.13%	2,248	41.63%	32	0.59%	35	0.65%	2	0.04%	837	15.50%	5,400
Bland County	498	56.14%	388	43.74%	0	0.00%	1	0.11%	0	0.00%	110	12.40%	887
Botetourt County	1,494	47.44%	1,614	51.25%	19	0.60%	22	0.70%	0	0.00%	-120	-3.81%	3,149
Brunswick County	1,372	58.56%	956	40.80%	3	0.13%	12	0.51%	3	0.13%	416	17.76%	2,343
Buchanan County	509	42.28%	695	57.72%	0	0.00%	0	0.00%	0	0.00%	-186	-15.45%	1,204
Buckingham County	1,247	50.32%	1,199	48.39%	8	0.32%	24	0.97%	2	0.08%	48	1.94%	2,478
Campbell County	2,115	55.27%	1,696	44.32%	8	0.21%	8	0.21%	2	0.05%	419	10.95%	3,827
Caroline County	1,293	45.97%	1,502	53.39%	9	0.32%	9	0.32%	1	0.04%	-209	-7.43%	2,813
Carroll County	1,528	47.65%	1,673	52.17%	3	0.09%	3	0.09%	0	0.00%	-145	-4.52%	3,207
Charles City County	272	42.11%	362	56.04%	5	0.77%	7	1.08%	0	0.00%	-90	-13.93%	646
Charlotte County	1,458	70.78%	538	26.12%	30	1.45%	34	1.65%	5	0.24%	920	44.66%	2,060
Chesterfield County	1,727	56.88%	1,273	41.93%	14	0.46%	22	0.72%	1	0.03%	454	14.95%	3,036
Clarke County	1,114	68.39%	490	30.08%	18	1.10%	7	0.43%	0	0.00%	624	38.31%	1,629
Craig County	490	64.73%	249	32.89%	18	2.38%	0	0.00%	0	0.00%	241	31.84%	757
Culpeper County	1,704	59.98%	1,113	39.18%	10	0.35%	14	0.49%	0	0.00%	591	20.80%	2,841
Cumberland County	618	48.13%	657	51.17%	4	0.31%	5	0.39%	0	0.00%	-39	-3.04%	1,284
Dickenson County	547	50.09%	534	48.90%	1	0.09%	10	0.92%	0	0.00%	13	1.19%	1,092
Dinwiddie County	1,099	59.47%	741	40.10%	1	0.05%	7	0.38%	0	0.00%	358	19.37%	1,848
Elizabeth City County	572	37.39%	919	60.07%	20	1.31%	19	1.24%	0	0.00%	-347	-22.68%	1,530
Essex County	924	57.86%	669	41.89%	1	0.06%	3	0.19%	0	0.00%	255	15.97%	1,597
Fairfax County	2,109	52.51%	1,877	46.74%	8	0.20%	22	0.55%	1	0.02%	232	5.78%	4,016
Fauquier County	2,744	63.40%	1,553	35.88%	9	0.21%	22	0.51%	2	0.05%	1,191	27.52%	4,328
Floyd County	848	35.53%	1,525	63.89%	12	0.50%	2	0.08%	1	0.04%	-677	-28.36%	2,387
Fluvanna County	919	55.97%	708	43.12%	3	0.18%	12	0.73%	1	0.06%	211	12.85%	1,642
Franklin County	2,305	57.28%	1,711	42.52%	5	0.12%	3	0.07%	0	0.00%	594	14.76%	4,024
Frederick County	1,848	67.74%	845	30.98%	24	0.88%	11	0.40%	0	0.00%	1,003	36.77%	2,728
Giles County	993	54.08%	777	42.32%	51	2.78%	15	0.82%	0	0.00%	216	11.76%	1,836
Gloucester County	819	59.13%	549	39.64%	10	0.72%	7	0.51%	1	0.07%	270	19.49%	1,385
Goochland County	676	42.62%	897	56.56%	3	0.19%	10	0.63%	0	0.00%	-221	-13.93%	1,586
Grayson County	1,328	46.91%	1,473	52.03%	2	0.07%	28	0.99%	0	0.00%	-145	-5.12%	2,831
Greene County	533	47.76%	581	52.06%	2	0.18%	0	0.00%	0	0.00%	-48	-4.30%	1,116
Greensville County	850	64.05%	471	35.49%	3	0.23%	3	0.23%	0	0.00%	379	28.56%	1,327
Halifax County	3,231	60.57%	2,050	38.43%	33	0.62%	20	0.37%	1	0.02%	1,181	22.14%	5,334
Hanover County	1,499	51.71%	1,337	46.12%	26	0.90%	37	1.28%	1	0.03%	162	5.59%	2,899
Henrico County	2,332	55.39%	1,817	43.16%	13	0.31%	48	1.14%	5	0.12%	515	12.23%	4,210
Henry County	1,409	43.95%	1,783	55.61%	10	0.31%	4	0.12%	0	0.00%	-374	-11.67%	3,206
Highland County	553	52.62%	489	46.53%	7	0.67%	2	0.19%	1	0.10%	64	6.09%	1,051
Isle of Wight County	1,264	63.17%	727	36.33%	7	0.35%	3	0.15%	7	0.35%	537	26.84%	2,001
James City County	261	47.03%	291	52.43%	2	0.36%	1	0.18%	1	0.18%	-30	-5.41%	555
King and Queen County	853	56.27%	655	43.21%	5	0.33%	3	0.20%	0	0.00%	198	13.06%	1,516
King George County	582	45.75%	681	53.54%	3	0.24%	6	0.47%	0	0.00%	-99	-7.78%	1,272
King William County	592	37.16%	990	62.15%	6	0.38%	5	0.31%	0	0.00%	-398	-24.98%	1,593
Lancaster County	1,073	63.42%	599	35.40%	16	0.94%	4	0.24%	3	0.18%	474	28.01%	1,692
Lee County	1,475	49.63%	1,470	49.46%	16	0.54%	11	0.37%	0	0.00%	5	0.17%	2,972
Loudoun County	2,741	56.67%	1,991	41.16%	96	1.98%	9	0.19%	0	0.00%	750	15.51%	4,837
Louisa County	1,366	48.93%	1,391	49.82%	25	0.90%	10	0.36%	0	0.00%	-25	-0.90%	2,792
Lunenburg County	1,045	68.30%	475	31.05%	6	0.39%	4	0.26%	0	0.00%	570	37.25%	1,530
Madison County	1,089	59.90%	724	39.82%	5	0.28%	0	0.00%	0	0.00%	365	20.08%	1,818
Mathews County	797	62.36%	444	34.74%	30	2.35%	7	0.55%	0	0.00%	353	27.62%	1,278
Mecklenburg County	2,099	46.81%	2,353	52.48%	26	0.58%	6	0.13%	0	0.00%	-254	-5.66%	4,484
Middlesex County	688	50.00%	680	49.42%	5	0.36%	3	0.22%	0	0.00%	8	0.58%	1,376
Montgomery County	1,317	44.21%	1,594	53.51%	56	1.88%	12	0.40%	1	0.03%	-277	-9.30%	2,979
Nansemond County	1,300	54.64%	1,060	44.56%	11	0.46%	8	0.34%	2	0.08%	240	10.09%	2,379
Nelson County	1,492	54.89%	1,183	43.52%	20	0.74%	23	0.85%	0	0.00%	309	11.37%	2,718
New Kent County	369	44.84%	446	54.19%	3	0.36%	5	0.61%	0	0.00%	-77	-9.36%	823
Norfolk County	2,137	37.66%	3,475	61.24%	33	0.58%	29	0.51%	7	0.12%	-1,338	-23.58%	5,674
Northampton County	1,086	56.56%	802	41.77%	21	1.09%	11	0.57%	0	0.00%	284	14.79%	1,920
Northumberland County	953	50.88%	904	48.26%	13	0.69%	3	0.16%	1	0.05%	49	2.62%	1,873
Nottoway County	936	65.36%	478	33.38%	16	1.12%	2	0.14%	0	0.00%	458	31.98%	1,432
Orange County	1,324	57.44%	957	41.52%	11	0.48%	13	0.56%	0	0.00%	367	15.92%	2,305
Page County	1,166	43.67%	1,454	54.46%	37	1.38%	13	0.49%	2	0.07%	-288	-10.79%	2,670
Patrick County	886	43.45%	1,140	55.91%	10	0.49%	3	0.15%	1	0.05%	-254	-12.46%	2,039
Pittsylvania County	3,987	55.04%	3,196	44.12%	36	0.50%	25	0.35%	0	0.00%	791	10.92%	7,244
Powhatan County	528	45.17%	637	54.49%	0	0.00%	4	0.34%	0	0.00%	-109	-9.32%	1,169
Prince Edward County	991	49.60%	979	49.00%	6	0.30%	22	1.10%	0	0.00%	12	0.60%	1,998
Prince George County	518	56.43%	394	42.92%	1	0.11%	5	0.54%	1	0.11%	124	13.51%	918
Prince William County	1,341	64.56%	727	35.00%	2	0.10%	7	0.34%	0	0.00%	614	29.56%	2,077
Princess Anne County	790	53.20%	687	46.26%	6	0.40%	2	0.13%	0	0.00%	103	6.94%	1,485
Pulaski County	1,109	42.51%	1,489	57.07%	3	0.11%	8	0.31%	1	0.04%	-380	-14.56%	2,609
Rappahannock County	1,076	65.05%	569	34.40%	1	0.06%	8	0.48%	0	0.00%	507	30.65%	1,654
Richmond County	667	49.63%	667	49.63%	3	0.22%	7	0.52%	0	0.00%	0	0.00%	1,344
Roanoke County	1,116	42.15%	1,484	56.04%	36	1.36%	12	0.45%	1	0.04%	-368	-13.90%	2,648
Rockbridge County	1,634	40.41%	2,290	56.63%	17	0.42%	103	2.55%	0	0.00%	-656	-16.22%	4,044
Rockingham County	2,998	45.09%	3,524	53.00%	100	1.50%	27	0.41%	0	0.00%	-526	-7.91%	6,649
Russell County	1,530	50.70%	1,475	48.87%	9	0.30%	4	0.13%	1	0.03%	55	1.82%	3,018
Scott County	1,793	44.67%	2,206	54.96%	4	0.10%	11	0.27%	1	0.02%	-413	-10.29%	4,014
Shenandoah County	2,052	48.26%	2,102	49.44%	51	1.20%	47	1.11%	0	0.00%	-50	-1.18%	4,252
Smyth County	1,407	47.41%	1,546	52.09%	8	0.27%	7	0.24%	4	0.13%	-139	-4.68%	2,968
Southampton County	1,438	75.80%	439	23.14%	14	0.74%	6	0.32%	0	0.00%	999	52.66%	1,897
Spotsylvania County	877	49.05%	903	50.50%	4	0.22%	4	0.22%	0	0.00%	-26	-1.45%	1,788
Stafford County	629	36.59%	1,084	63.06%	3	0.17%	3	0.17%	0	0.00%	-455	-26.47%	1,719
Surry County	709	53.39%	609	45.86%	5	0.38%	5	0.38%	0	0.00%	100	7.53%	1,328
Sussex County	769	64.46%	418	35.04%	2	0.17%	4	0.34%	0	0.00%	351	29.42%	1,193
Tazewell County	1,582	38.36%	2,525	61.23%	8	0.19%	9	0.22%	0	0.00%	-943	-22.87%	4,124
Warren County	1,172	65.40%	575	32.09%	25	1.40%	20	1.12%	0	0.00%	597	33.31%	1,792
Warwick County	238	29.10%	577	70.54%	1	0.12%	2	0.24%	0	0.00%	-339	-41.44%	818
Washington County	2,374	46.74%	2,669	52.55%	20	0.39%	16	0.32%	0	0.00%	-295	-5.81%	5,079
Westmoreland County	705	45.72%	827	53.63%	2	0.13%	8	0.52%	1	0.06%	-122	-7.91%	1,542
Wise County	966	43.87%	1,230	55.86%	0	0.00%	6	0.27%	1	0.05%	-264	-11.99%	2,202
Wythe County	1,683	46.17%	1,882	51.63%	9	0.25%	71	1.95%	4	0.11%	-199	-5.46%	3,645
York County	722	75.05%	223	23.18%	16	1.66%	1	0.10%	0	0.00%	499	51.87%	962
Alexandria City	1,830	57.55%	1,281	40.28%	37	1.16%	32	1.01%	4	0.13%	549	17.26%	3,180
Bristol City	413	50.06%	384	46.55%	16	1.94%	12	1.45%	0	0.00%	29	3.52%	825
Buena Vista City	219	53.81%	184	45.21%	0	0.00%	3	0.74%	0	0.00%	35	8.60%	407
Charlottesville City	801	67.31%	371	31.18%	7	0.59%	11	0.92%	0	0.00%	430	36.13%	1,190
Danville City	1,702	59.26%	1,078	37.53%	51	1.78%	41	1.43%	0	0.00%	624	21.73%	2,872
Fredericksburg City	533	56.88%	388	41.41%	7	0.74%	9	0.96%	3	0.32%	145	15.47%	937
Lynchburg City	1,657	49.21%	1,647	48.92%	37	1.10%	26	0.77%	0	0.00%	10	0.30%	3,367
Manchester City	812	56.90%	588	41.21%	9	0.63%	18	1.26%	1	0.07%	224	15.70%	1,427
Newport News City	676	44.59%	815	53.76%	5	0.33%	20	1.32%	1	0.07%	-139	-9.17%	1,516
Norfolk City	3,068	58.67%	1,995	38.15%	73	1.39%	93	1.78%	5	0.10%	1,073	20.52%	5,229
Petersburg City	1,682	66.32%	766	30.21%	5	0.20%	83	3.27%	2	0.08%	916	36.12%	2,536
Portsmouth City	1,380	62.61%	769	34.89%	7	0.32%	48	2.18%	1	0.05%	611	27.72%	2,204
Radford City	372	52.47%	309	43.58%	18	2.54%	10	1.41%	0	0.00%	63	8.89%	709
Richmond City	7,839	58.36%	5,160	38.42%	99	0.74%	334	2.49%	5	0.04%	2,679	19.94%	13,432
Roanoke City	2,005	52.86%	1,697	44.74%	58	1.53%	33	0.87%	2	0.05%	308	8.12%	3,793
Staunton City	713	50.82%	556	39.63%	92	6.55%	42	2.99%	1	0.07%	157	11.19%	1,403
Williamsburg City	113	54.59%	90	43.48%	3	1.45%	1	0.48%	0	0.00%	23	11.11%	207
Winchester City	490	49.70%	447	45.33%	22	2.23%	27	2.74%	1	0.10%	43	4.36%	986
Totals	154,978	52.56%	135,379	45.92%	2,350	0.80%	2,129	0.72%	108	0.04%	19,599	6.65%	294,837

== See also ==
- United States presidential elections in Virginia
