= 1888 United States presidential election in Virginia =

- November 6, 1888
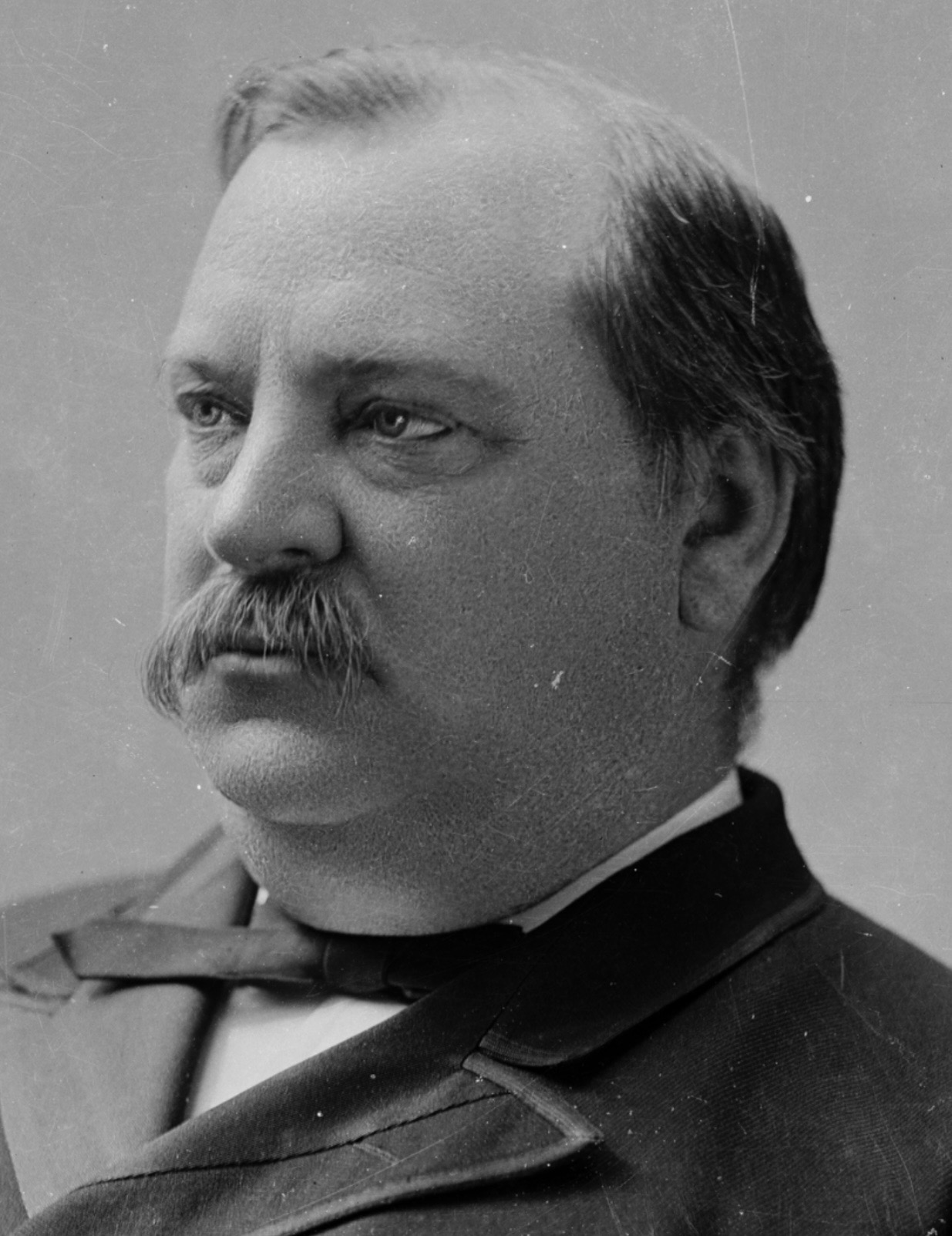

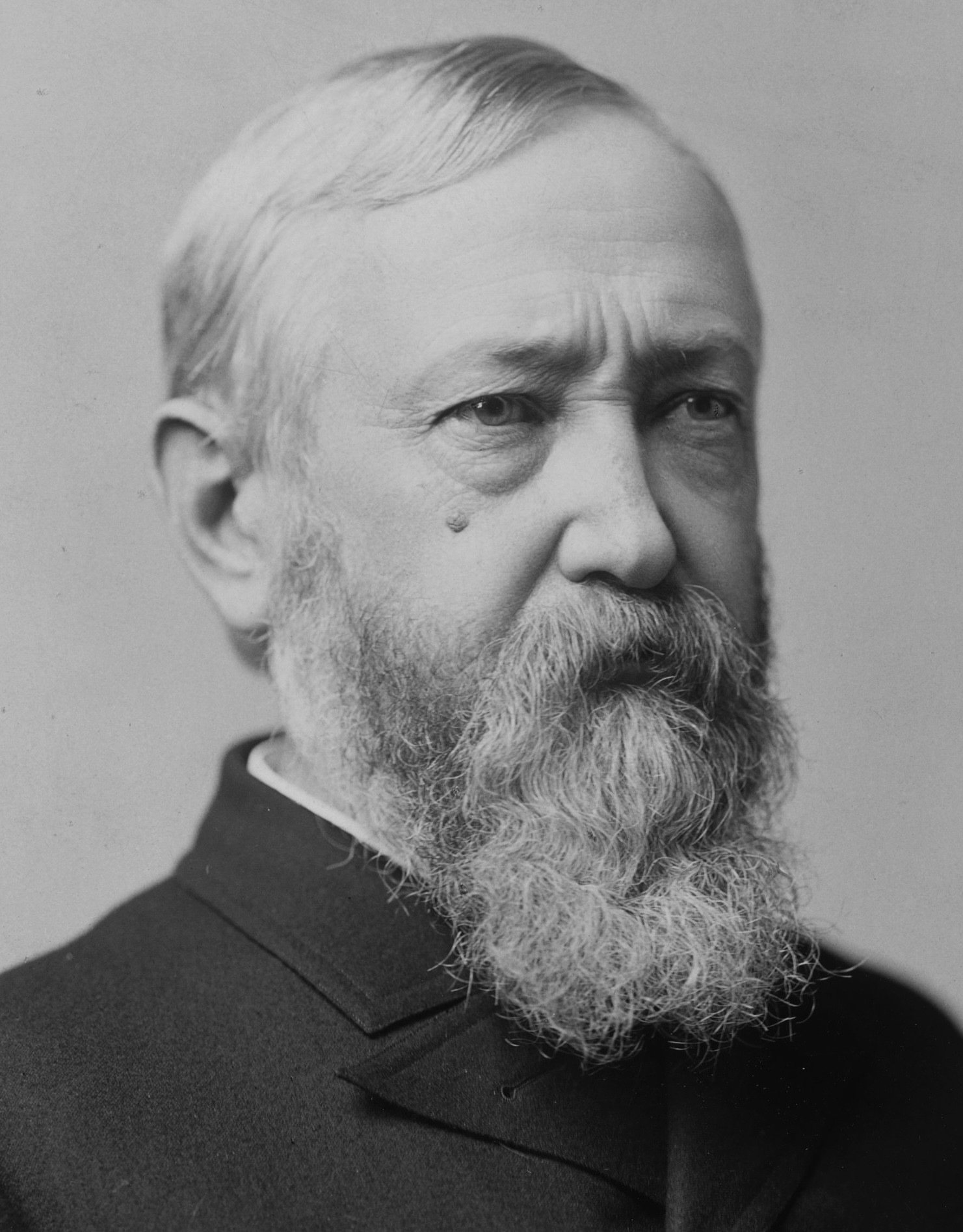
Nominee	Grover Cleveland	Benjamin Harrison
Party	Democratic	Republican
Home state	New York	Indiana
Running mate	Allen G. Thurman	Levi P. Morton
Electoral vote	12	0
Popular vote	152,004	150,399
Percentage	49.99%	49.46%
County and independent city results
Cleveland
50–60%
60–70%
70–80%
Harrison
50–60%
60–70%
70–80%
President before election
Grover Cleveland
Democratic
Elected President
Benjamin Harrison
Republican

The 1888 United States presidential election in Virginia took place on November 6, 1888, as part of the 1888 United States presidential election. Voters chose 12 representatives, or electors to the Electoral College, who voted for president and vice president.

Virginia voted for the Democratic candidate, incumbent President Grover Cleveland over the Republican candidate, former U.S. Senator Benjamin Harrison. The contest in Virginia was very close and Cleveland narrowly won the state by a margin of just 0.53 percentage points. This was the closest the Republican Party came to winning an ex-Confederate state between the Compromise of 1877 and Warren G. Harding’s 1920 win in Tennessee, and with Virginia voting 0.30 points more Republican than the nation at-large, would also prove the last time any former Confederate state voted more Republican than the nation until Virginia itself did so in 1952.

This election represented the height of the expanded Reconstruction Era electorate. So complete was to be the disfranchisement of Virginia's lower classes with the new Constitution of 1902 that it wouldn't be until 1952, with a much larger population, before the electorate returned to the same numbers observed in 1888. (Note: This figure takes into account the fact that the Nineteenth Amendment had enfranchised women in 1920, so that the equivalent size is twice the total vote cast in 1888.)

== Results ==
1888 United States presidential election in Virginia
Party	Candidate	Votes	Percentage	Electoral votes
Democratic	Grover Cleveland (inc.)	152,004	49.99%	12
Republican	Benjamin Harrison	150,399	49.46%	0
Prohibition	Clinton B. Fisk	1,684	0.55%	0
Totals		304,087	100.0%	12

=== Results by county ===
1888 United States presidential election in Virginia by counties and independent cities
County/ city	Grover Cleveland Democratic		Benjamin Harrison Republican		Clinton B. Fisk Prohibition		Margin		Total votes cast
County/ city	#	%	#	%	#	%	#	%	Total votes cast
Accomack County	3,184	59.70%	1,993	37.37%	156	2.93%	1,191	22.33%	5,333
Albemarle County	2,573	54.15%	2,166	45.58%	13	0.27%	407	8.56%	4,752
Alexandria County	255	35.12%	462	63.64%	9	1.24%	-207	-28.51%	726
Alleghany County	759	43.13%	995	56.53%	6	0.34%	-236	-13.41%	1,760
Amelia County	704	40.46%	1,036	59.54%	0	0.00%	-332	-19.08%	1,740
Amherst County	1,777	55.74%	1,411	44.26%	0	0.00%	366	11.48%	3,188
Appomattox County	689	46.24%	787	52.82%	14	0.94%	-98	-6.58%	1,490
Augusta County	3,370	56.36%	2,526	42.25%	83	1.39%	844	14.12%	5,979
Bath County	482	54.22%	405	45.56%	2	0.22%	77	8.66%	889
Bedford County	3,204	61.64%	1,991	38.30%	3	0.06%	1,213	23.34%	5,198
Bland County	537	51.34%	509	48.66%	0	0.00%	28	2.68%	1,046
Botetourt County	1,558	55.62%	1,217	43.45%	26	0.93%	341	12.17%	2,801
Brunswick County	1,289	45.79%	1,521	54.03%	5	0.18%	-232	-8.24%	2,815
Buchanan County	492	53.54%	427	46.46%	0	0.00%	65	7.07%	919
Buckingham County	1,184	43.67%	1,520	56.07%	7	0.26%	-336	-12.39%	2,711
Campbell County	2,089	57.00%	1,564	42.67%	12	0.33%	525	14.32%	3,665
Caroline County	1,442	47.56%	1,588	52.37%	2	0.07%	-146	-4.82%	3,032
Carroll County	1,322	53.18%	1,147	46.14%	17	0.68%	175	7.04%	2,486
Charles City County	303	30.67%	684	69.23%	1	0.10%	-381	-38.56%	988
Charlotte County	1,720	62.39%	1,036	37.58%	1	0.04%	684	24.81%	2,757
Chesterfield County	1,589	50.05%	1,576	49.64%	10	0.31%	13	0.41%	3,175
Clarke County	1,204	69.20%	529	30.40%	7	0.40%	675	38.79%	1,740
Craig County	550	75.24%	177	24.21%	4	0.55%	373	51.03%	731
Culpeper County	1,404	54.31%	1,181	45.69%	0	0.00%	223	8.63%	2,585
Cumberland County	578	35.61%	1,045	64.39%	0	0.00%	-467	-28.77%	1,623
Dickenson County	451	53.95%	384	45.93%	1	0.12%	67	8.01%	836
Dinwiddie County	1,066	42.86%	1,411	56.74%	10	0.40%	-345	-13.87%	2,487
Elizabeth City County	547	29.10%	1,316	70.00%	17	0.90%	-769	-40.90%	1,880
Essex County	774	41.57%	1,088	58.43%	0	0.00%	-314	-16.86%	1,862
Fairfax County	2,010	52.21%	1,824	47.38%	16	0.42%	186	4.83%	3,850
Fauquier County	2,661	59.95%	1,778	40.05%	0	0.00%	883	19.89%	4,439
Floyd County	952	38.78%	1,482	60.37%	21	0.86%	-530	-21.59%	2,455
Fluvanna County	1,004	57.31%	739	42.18%	9	0.51%	265	15.13%	1,752
Franklin County	2,403	57.71%	1,757	42.20%	4	0.10%	646	15.51%	4,164
Frederick County	1,832	66.72%	871	31.72%	43	1.57%	961	35.00%	2,746
Giles County	977	59.36%	640	38.88%	29	1.76%	337	20.47%	1,646
Gloucester County	1,073	43.94%	1,368	56.02%	1	0.04%	-295	-12.08%	2,442
Goochland County	674	40.63%	985	59.37%	0	0.00%	-311	-18.75%	1,659
Grayson County	1,288	50.47%	1,259	49.33%	5	0.20%	29	1.14%	2,552
Greene County	532	50.57%	520	49.43%	0	0.00%	12	1.14%	1,052
Greensville County	714	44.35%	893	55.47%	3	0.19%	-179	-11.12%	1,610
Halifax County	3,570	58.74%	2,473	40.69%	35	0.58%	1,097	18.05%	6,078
Hanover County	1,721	53.22%	1,511	46.72%	2	0.06%	210	6.49%	3,234
Henrico County	1,712	42.40%	2,326	57.60%	0	0.00%	-614	-15.21%	4,038
Henry County	1,409	46.55%	1,608	53.12%	10	0.33%	-199	-6.57%	3,027
Highland County	454	50.33%	440	48.78%	8	0.89%	14	1.55%	902
Isle of Wight County	1,200	51.81%	1,116	48.19%	0	0.00%	84	3.63%	2,316
James City County	219	26.51%	607	73.49%	0	0.00%	-388	-46.97%	826
King and Queen County	958	53.61%	829	46.39%	0	0.00%	129	7.22%	1,787
King George County	542	42.95%	720	57.05%	0	0.00%	-178	-14.10%	1,262
King William County	746	40.57%	1,093	59.43%	0	0.00%	-347	-18.87%	1,839
Lancaster County	839	47.32%	928	52.34%	6	0.34%	-89	-5.02%	1,773
Lee County	1,479	52.86%	1,295	46.28%	24	0.86%	184	6.58%	2,798
Loudoun County	2,842	55.83%	2,190	43.03%	58	1.14%	652	12.81%	5,090
Louisa County	1,157	40.70%	1,677	58.99%	9	0.32%	-520	-18.29%	2,843
Lunenburg County	1,215	60.12%	806	39.88%	0	0.00%	409	20.24%	2,021
Madison County	961	51.45%	907	48.55%	0	0.00%	54	2.89%	1,868
Mathews County	1,023	61.92%	615	37.23%	14	0.85%	408	24.70%	1,652
Mecklenburg County	1,764	40.25%	2,607	59.48%	12	0.27%	-843	-19.23%	4,383
Middlesex County	635	40.81%	909	58.42%	12	0.77%	-274	-17.61%	1,556
Montgomery County	1,335	44.51%	1,516	50.55%	148	4.93%	-181	-6.04%	2,999
Nansemond County	1,382	39.84%	2,087	60.16%	0	0.00%	-705	-20.32%	3,469
Nelson County	1,554	55.94%	1,224	44.06%	0	0.00%	330	11.88%	2,778
New Kent County	375	34.92%	689	64.15%	10	0.93%	-314	-29.24%	1,074
Norfolk County	1,969	34.41%	3,741	65.37%	13	0.23%	-1,772	-30.96%	5,723
Northampton County	980	44.53%	1,221	55.47%	0	0.00%	-241	-10.95%	2,201
Northumberland County	851	48.41%	905	51.48%	2	0.11%	-54	-3.07%	1,758
Nottoway County	611	35.30%	1,116	64.47%	4	0.23%	-505	-29.17%	1,731
Orange County	1,126	49.21%	1,153	50.39%	9	0.39%	-27	-1.18%	2,288
Page County	1,195	47.05%	1,333	52.48%	12	0.47%	-138	-5.43%	2,540
Patrick County	1,239	54.46%	1,022	44.92%	14	0.62%	217	9.54%	2,275
Pittsylvania County	4,261	52.36%	3,847	47.27%	30	0.37%	414	5.09%	8,138
Powhatan County	561	42.21%	767	57.71%	1	0.08%	-206	-15.50%	1,329
Prince Edward County	1,130	42.63%	1,519	57.30%	2	0.08%	-389	-14.67%	2,651
Prince George County	661	39.37%	1,018	60.63%	0	0.00%	-357	-21.26%	1,679
Prince William County	1,313	63.83%	740	35.97%	4	0.19%	573	27.86%	2,057
Princess Anne County	844	45.52%	1,004	54.15%	6	0.32%	-160	-8.63%	1,854
Pulaski County	1,070	51.47%	993	47.76%	16	0.77%	77	3.70%	2,079
Rappahannock County	1,034	65.15%	553	34.85%	0	0.00%	481	30.31%	1,587
Richmond County	553	42.60%	741	57.09%	4	0.31%	-188	-14.48%	1,298
Roanoke County	935	42.58%	1,212	55.19%	49	2.23%	-277	-12.61%	2,196
Rockbridge County	2,030	49.22%	2,074	50.29%	20	0.48%	-44	-1.07%	4,124
Rockingham County	2,895	46.80%	3,175	51.33%	116	1.88%	-280	-4.53%	6,186
Russell County	1,601	54.23%	1,333	45.16%	18	0.61%	268	9.08%	2,952
Scott County	1,550	46.27%	1,800	53.73%	0	0.00%	-250	-7.46%	3,350
Shenandoah County	2,164	50.81%	2,063	48.44%	32	0.75%	101	2.37%	4,259
Smyth County	1,310	51.57%	1,228	48.35%	2	0.08%	82	3.23%	2,540
Southampton County	1,560	41.81%	2,117	56.74%	54	1.45%	-557	-14.93%	3,731
Spotsylvania County	876	48.67%	922	51.22%	2	0.11%	-46	-2.56%	1,800
Stafford County	595	40.26%	883	59.74%	0	0.00%	-288	-19.49%	1,478
Surry County	661	37.39%	1,101	62.27%	6	0.34%	-440	-24.89%	1,768
Sussex County	896	36.07%	1,582	63.69%	6	0.24%	-686	-27.62%	2,484
Tazewell County	1,307	36.31%	2,245	62.36%	48	1.33%	-938	-26.06%	3,600
Warren County	1,224	72.43%	440	26.04%	26	1.54%	784	46.39%	1,690
Warwick County	385	33.54%	763	66.46%	0	0.00%	-378	-32.93%	1,148
Washington County	2,920	52.82%	2,548	46.09%	60	1.09%	372	6.73%	5,528
Westmoreland County	626	38.24%	1,009	61.64%	2	0.12%	-383	-23.40%	1,637
Wise County	722	49.15%	742	50.51%	5	0.34%	-20	-1.36%	1,469
Wythe County	1,462	46.84%	1,643	52.64%	16	0.51%	-181	-5.80%	3,121
York County	495	33.13%	972	65.06%	27	1.81%	-477	-31.93%	1,494
Alexandria City	1,665	51.95%	1,523	47.52%	17	0.53%	142	4.43%	3,205
Charlottesville City	674	61.89%	407	37.37%	8	0.73%	267	24.52%	1,089
Danville City	1,070	56.76%	812	43.08%	3	0.16%	258	13.69%	1,885
Fredericksburg City	595	59.26%	409	40.74%	0	0.00%	186	18.53%	1,004
Lynchburg City	2,054	53.20%	1,796	46.52%	11	0.28%	258	6.68%	3,861
Manchester City	896	54.63%	735	44.82%	9	0.55%	161	9.82%	1,640
Norfolk City	2,613	44.77%	3,198	54.80%	25	0.43%	-585	-10.02%	5,836
North Danville City	337	60.07%	223	39.75%	1	0.18%	114	20.32%	561
Petersburg City	2,067	48.46%	2,198	51.54%	0	0.00%	-131	-3.07%	4,265
Portsmouth City	1,439	55.99%	1,107	43.07%	24	0.93%	332	12.92%	2,570
Richmond City	8,211	56.69%	6,273	43.31%	0	0.00%	1,938	13.38%	14,484
Radford City	1,155	53.97%	976	45.61%	9	0.42%	179	8.36%	2,140
Roanoke City	719	54.43%	535	40.50%	67	5.07%	184	13.93%	1,321
Staunton City	101	37.83%	161	60.30%	5	1.87%	-60	-22.47%	267
Winchester City	488	46.83%	540	51.82%	14	1.34%	-52	-4.99%	1,042
Totals	152,004	49.99%	150,399	49.46%	1,684	0.55%	1,605	0.53%	304,087

== See also ==
- United States presidential elections in Virginia
