= 1804 United States presidential election in Virginia =

- November 5, 1804
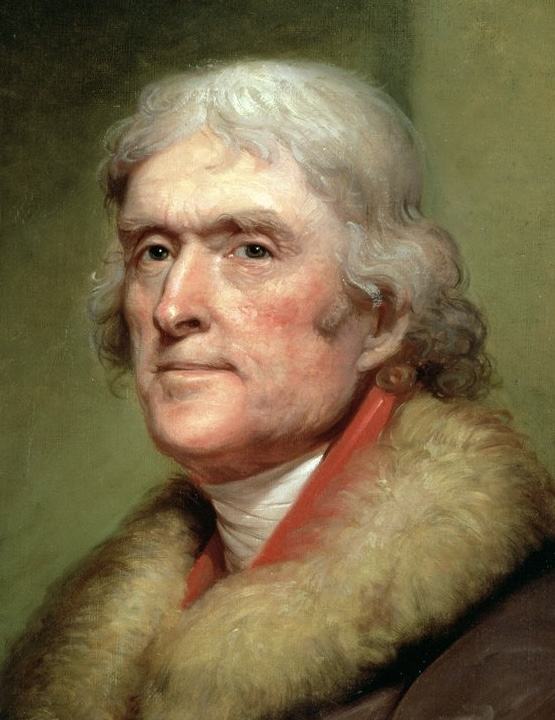

Nominee	Thomas Jefferson	Unpledged electors (write-in)
Party	Democratic-Republican	Federalist
Home state	Virginia	N/A
Running mate	George Clinton	N/A
Electoral vote	24	0
Popular vote	12,914	129
Percentage	98.9%	1.0%
County results
Jefferson
80–90%
90–100%
No data
President before election
Thomas Jefferson
Democratic-Republican
Elected President
Thomas Jefferson
Democratic-Republican

A presidential election was held in Virginia on November 5, 1804, as part of the 1804 United States presidential election. The Democratic-Republican Party's ticket of incumbent president Thomas Jefferson and former New York governor George Clinton was elected virtually without opposition.

The Virginia Federalist Party chose not to contest the election. Different lists of unpledged electors received write-in votes in a few counties; in some cases, these tickets included a mix of Federalist and Democratic-Republican candidates or were composed of fictitious names. Federalist writers complained that the state's general ticket law made the election result a foregone conclusion, and voter turnout was noticeably low. Jefferson won the national election in a landslide over the de facto Federalist candidate, Charles Cotesworth Pinckney, who received 14 electoral votes to Jefferson's 162.

== General ticket ==
=== Summary ===
Virginia chose 24 electors on a statewide general ticket. Nineteenth-century election laws required voters to elect the members of the Electoral College individually, rather than as a block. This sometimes resulted in small differences in the number of votes cast for electors pledged to the same presidential nominee, if some voters did not vote for all the electors nominated by a party. A confusing situation unfolded in Virginia, as a result of the Virginia Federalist Party's decision not to nominate electors. More than 300 candidates received votes across 93 participating counties, including 24 electors on the Democratic-Republican ticket. While the Democratic-Republican candidates ran unopposed in much of the state, several hundred write-in candidates received votes in a handful of counties as Federalist or "opposition" electors. Some opposition tickets included electors on the Democratic-Republican slate, while others were believed to be wholly fictitious. Although a clandestine gathering of Congressional Federalists had nominated Pinckney in February, the Virginia anti-Jefferson electors were apparently unpledged.

In sum, the leading Democratic-Republican elector, William H. Cabell, received 12,926 votes; the leading Federalist elector received 75 votes; while several dozen unknown candidates received between 1 and 16 votes as anti-Jefferson electors. Cabell received 45 votes on opposition tickets, while James Allen received 12,866 votes as a Democratic-Republican and two votes as a Federalist. The following table calculates the sum of the votes for the leading electors in each county to give an approximate sense of the statewide popular vote; for accuracy, votes for Cabell and Allen on anti-Jefferson tickets are subtracted from the Democratic-Republican total.

1804 United States presidential election in Virginia
Party	Candidate	Votes	%
Democratic-Republican	Thomas Jefferson George Clinton	12,914	98.94
Federalist	Unpledged electors (write-in)	129	0.99
Write-in		9	0.07
Total votes		13,052	100.00

=== Results ===
1804 United States presidential election in Virginia
Party	Candidate	Votes
Democratic-Republican	William H. Cabell (Note: Including 45 votes on opposition tickets.)	12,926
Democratic-Republican	George Wythe	12,885
Democratic-Republican	John Taylor	12,880
Democratic-Republican	George Penn	12,878
Democratic-Republican	Archibald Stewart	12,877
Democratic-Republican	Larkin Smith	12,876
Democratic-Republican	John Taliaferro	12,876
Democratic-Republican	Creed Taylor	12,876
Democratic-Republican	Mann Page	12,875
Democratic-Republican	John Goodrich	12,873
Democratic-Republican	Hugh Holmes	12,873
Democratic-Republican	John Minor	12,873
Democratic-Republican	Richard Brent	12,872
Democratic-Republican	Richard Field	12,871
Democratic-Republican	William Ellzey	12,870
Democratic-Republican	Richard Evers Lee	12,869
Democratic-Republican	Thomas Read	12,869
Democratic-Republican	James Allen (Note: Including two votes on a Federalist ticket.)	12,868
Democratic-Republican	James MacFarlane	12,867
Democratic-Republican	William McKinley	12,867
Democratic-Republican	John Preston	12,866
Democratic-Republican	James Daily	12,865
Democratic-Republican	William Dudley	12,863
Democratic-Republican	Edward Pegram	12,859
Write-in (Note: Excluding votes for unknown candidates.)		2,520
Total votes		≈13,052

=== Results by county ===
1804 United States presidential election in Virginia by county
County	Thomas Jefferson Democratic-Republican		Unpledged electors Federalist		Other		Margin		Total
County	Votes	%	Votes	%	Votes	%	Votes	%	Total
Accomack	23	100.00	—		—		23	100.00	23
Albemarle	416	100.00	—		—		416	100.00	416
Amelia	93	100.00	—		—		93	100.00	93
Amherst	67	100.00	—		—		67	100.00	67
Augusta	289 (Note: Including votes for William H. Cabell as an elector on the Democratic-Republican ticket.)	91.17	28 (Note: Including votes for William H. Cabell as an elector on the Federalist ticket.)	8.83	—		261	82.33	317
Bath	33	100.00	—		—		33	100.00	33
Bedford	53	100.00	—		—		53	100.00	53
Berkeley	134	100.00	—		—		134	100.00	134
Botetourt	81	100.00	—		—		81	100.00	81
Brooke	149	100.00	—		—		149	100.00	149
Brunswick	83	100.00	—		—		83	100.00	83
Buckingham	262	100.00	—		—		262	100.00	262
Campbell	84	100.00	—		—		84	100.00	84
Caroline	166	100.00	—		—		166	100.00	166
Charles City	73	100.00	—		—		73	100.00	73
Charlotte	316	100.00	—		—		316	100.00	316
Chesterfield	126	100.00	—		—		126	100.00	126
City of Williamsburg	42	84.00	8	16.00	—		34	68.00	50
Culpeper	192	99.48	1	0.52	—		191	98.96	193
Cumberland	109	100.00	—		—		109	100.00	109
Dinwiddie	81	100.00	—		—		81	100.00	81
Elizabeth City	57	100.00	—		—		57	100.00	57
Essex	138	99.28	1	0.72	—		137	98.56	139
Fairfax	171	90.00	19	10.00	—		152	80.00	190
Fauquier	91	100.00	—		—		91	100.00	91
Fluvanna	183	100.00	—		—		183	100.00	183
Franklin	171	100.00	—		—		171	100.00	171
Frederick	316	100.00	—		—		316	100.00	316
Gloucester	226	99.56	—		1	0.44%	226	99.56	227
Goochland	160	100.00	—		—		160	100.00	160
Grayson	49	100.00	—		—		49	100.00	49
Greenbrier	81	97.59	2	2.41	—		79	95.18	83
Greensville	94	100.00	—		—		94	100.00	94
Halifax	398	100.00	—		—		398	100.00	398
Hampshire	90	100.00	—		—		90	100.00	90
Hanover	171	100.00	—		—		171	100.00	171
Hardy	32	100.00	—		—		32	100.00	32
Harrison	317	100.00	—		—		317	100.00	317
Henrico	230	100.00	—		—		230	100.00	230
Henry	78	100.00	—		—		78	100.00	78
Isle of Wight	239	100.00	—		—		239	100.00	239
James City	66	95.65	3	4.35	—		63	91.30	69
Jefferson	98	100.00	—		—		98	100.00	98
Kanawha	**		**		**		**		**
King and Queen	270	100.00	—		—		270	100.00	270
King George	96	91.43	9	8.57	—		87	82.86	105
King William	85	100.00	—		—		85	100.00	85
Lancaster	183	97.34	5	2.66	—		178	94.68	188
Lee	62	100.00	—		—		62	100.00	62
Loudoun	57	100.00	—		—		57	100.00	57
Louisa	130	100.00	—		—		130	100.00	130
Lunenburg	68	100.00	—		—		68	100.00	68
Madison	160	100.00	—		—		160	100.00	160
Mathews	103	100.00	—		—		103	100.00	103
Mecklenburg	145	100.00	—		—		145	100.00	145
Middlesex	137	97.86	3	2.14	—		134	95.71	140
Monongalia	272	91.28	26	8.72	—		246	82.55	298
Monroe	72	92.31	6	7.69	—		66	84.62	78
Montgomery	61	100.00	—		—		61	100.00	61
Nansemond	23	100.00	—		—		23	100.00	23
New Kent	47	100.00	—		—		47	100.00	47
Norfolk	305	99.67	1	0.33	—		304	99.35	306
Northampton	8	100.00	—		—		8	100.00	8
Northumberland	219	100.00	—		—		219	100.00	219
Nottoway	84	100.00	—		—		84	100.00	84
Ohio	145	98.64	2	1.36	—		143	97.28	147
Orange	124	100.00	—		—		124	100.00	124
Patrick	40	100.00	—		—		40	100.00	40
Pendleton	119	92.25	10	7.75	—		109	84.50	129
Pittsylvania	358	100.00	—		—		358	100.00	358
Powhatan	111	100.00	—		—		111	100.00	111
Prince Edward	188	100.00	—		—		188	100.00	188
Prince George	57	100.00	—		—		57	100.00	57
Prince William	124	98.41	2	1.59	—		122	96.83	126
Princess Anne	153	100.00	—		—		153	100.00	153
Randolph	58	**	** (Note: At least 13 distinct Federalist tickets received an unknown number of votes.)		—		**		**
Richmond	132	100.00	—		—		132	100.00	132
Rockbridge	240	100.00	—		—		240	100.00	240
Rockingham	421	100.00	—		—		421	100.00	421
Russell	31	100.00	—		—		31	100.00	31
Shenandoah	360	100.00	—		—		360	100.00	360
Southampton	133	100.00	—		—		133	100.00	133
Spotsylvania	102	100.00	—		—		102	100.00	102
Stafford	63	100.00	—		—		63	100.00	63
Surry	93	100.00	—		—		93	100.00	93
Sussex	203	100.00	—		—		203	100.00	203
Tazewell	49	100.00	—		—		49	100.00	49
Warwick	51	100.00	—		—		51	100.00	51
Washington	409	100.00	—		—		409	100.00	409
Westmoreland	68	100.00	—		—		68	100.00	68
Wood	65	89.04	—		8	10.96	65	89.04	73
Wythe	33	100.00	—		—		33	100.00	33
York	69	95.83	3	4.17	—		66	91.67	72
TOTAL	12,914	98.94	129	0.99	9	0.07	12,785	97.95	13,052

== See also ==
- United States presidential elections in Virginia

== Bibliography ==
- Broussard, James H. (1978). The Southern Federalists, 1800–1816. Baton Rouge: Louisiana State University Press.
- Dauer, Manning Julian (2002). "Election of 1804". In Schlesinger, Arthur M. Jr.; Israel, Fred L. (eds.). History of American Presidential Elections, 1789–2001. Vol. 1. Philadelphia: Chelsea House Publishers. pp. 159–82.
- Harman, John Newton (1922). Annals of Tazewell County, Virginia, from 1800 to 1922. Vol. 1. Richmond: W. C. Hill Printing Company.
- Lampi, Philip J. (n.d.). "Electoral College". A New Nation Votes. American Antiquarian Society.
- Lampi, Philip J. (2012). "Virginia 1804 Electoral College". A New Nation Votes. American Antiquarian Society.
