= 1876 United States presidential election in Virginia =

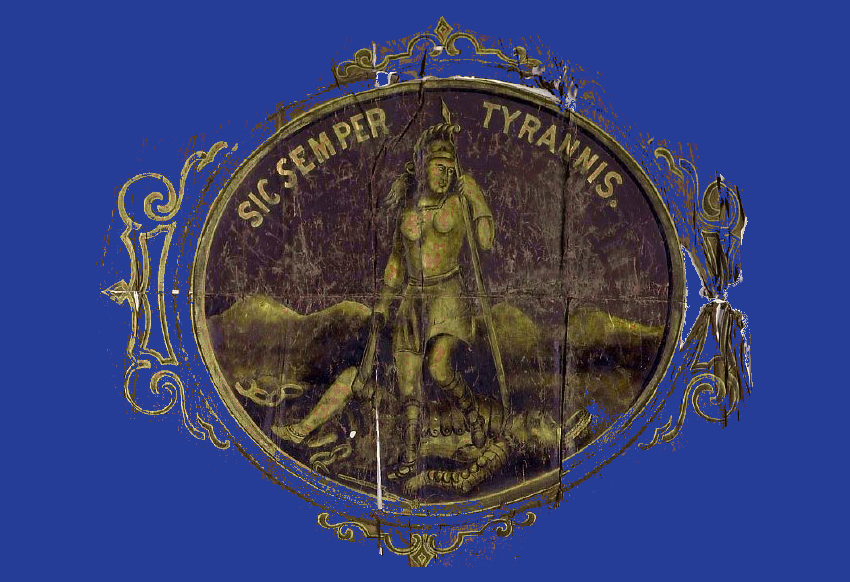
- November 7, 1876
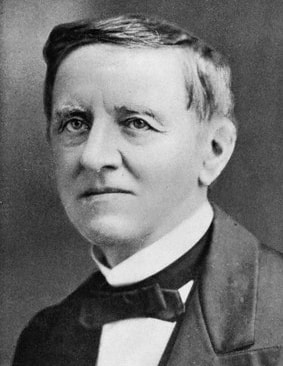

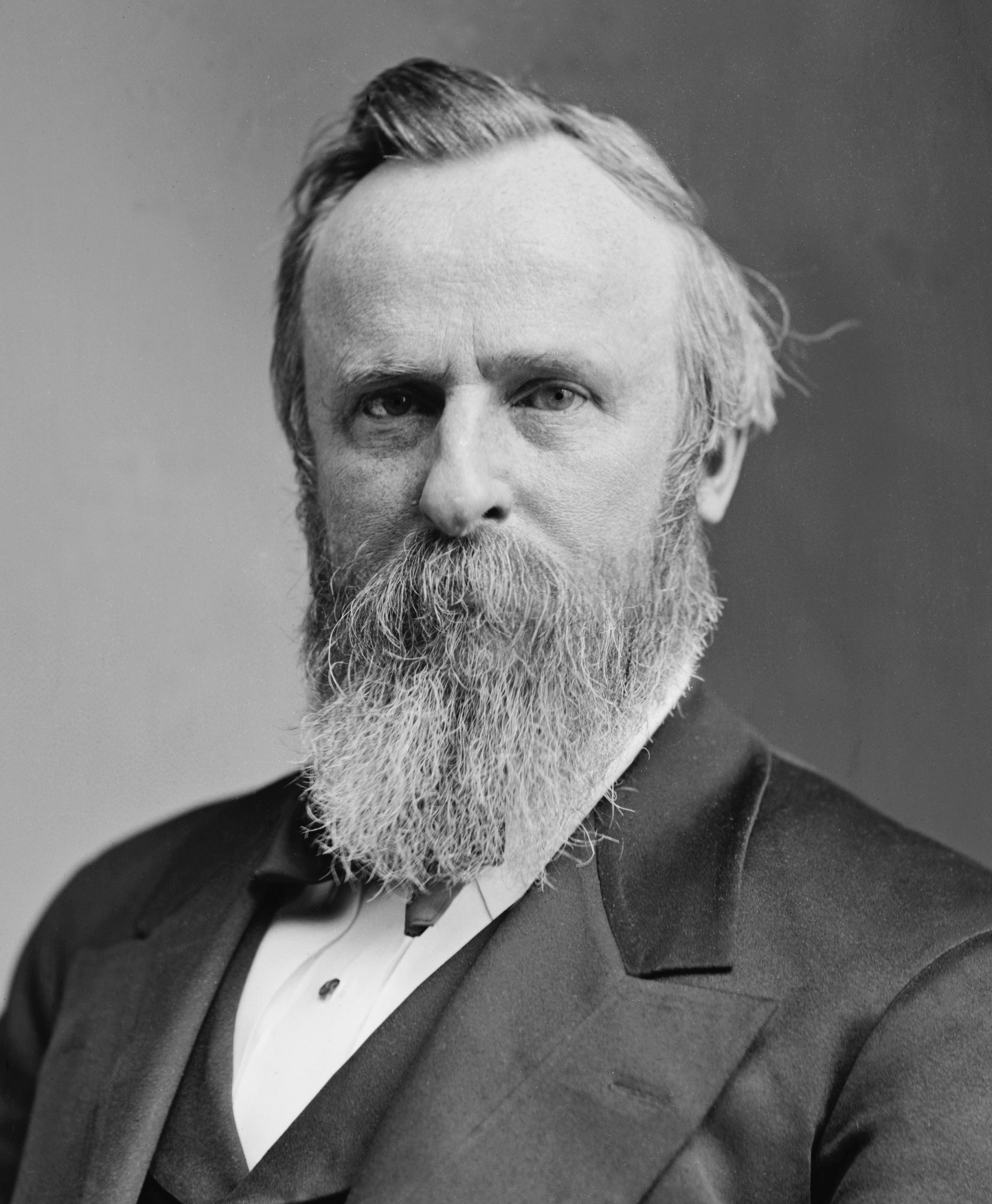
| Nominee | Samuel J. Tilden | Rutherford B. Hayes |
| Party | Democratic | Republican |
| Home state | New York | Ohio |
| Running mate | Thomas A. Hendricks | William A. Wheeler |
| Electoral vote | 11 | 0 |
| Popular vote | 140,770 | 95,518 |
| Percentage | 59.58% | 40.42% |
County and independent city results
Tilden
50–60%
60–70%
70–80%
80–90%
90–100%
Hayes
50–60%
60–70%
70–80%
President before election
Ulysses S. Grant
Republican
Elected President
Rutherford B. Hayes
Republican

The 1876 United States presidential election in Virginia took place on November 7, 1876, as part of the 1876 United States presidential election. Voters chose 11 representatives, or electors to the Electoral College, who voted for president and vice president.

Virginia voted for the Democratic candidate, New York Governor Samuel J. Tilden over the Republican candidate, Ohio Governor Rutherford B. Hayes. Tilden won Virginia by a margin of 19.15%.

== Results ==
1876 United States presidential election in Virginia
| Party | Candidate | Votes | Percentage | Electoral votes |
|---|---|---|---|---|
| Democratic | Samuel J. Tilden | 140,770 | 59.58% | 11 |
| Republican | Rutherford B. Hayes | 95,518 | 40.42% | 0 |
| Totals | | 236,288 | 100.0% | 11 |

== See also ==
- United States presidential elections in Virginia
