= 1816 United States presidential election in Virginia =

- November 4, 1816
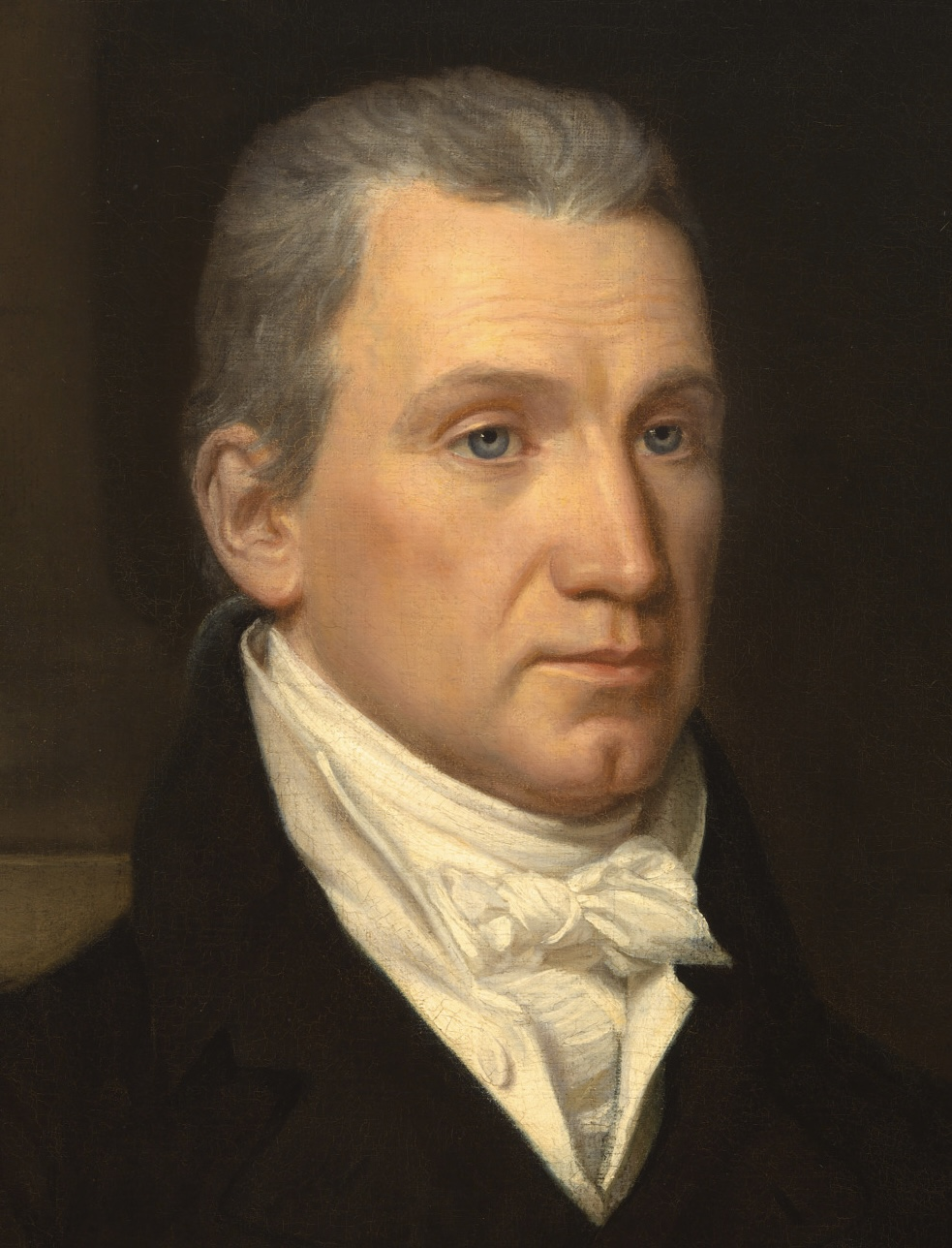

| Nominee | James Monroe | Unpledged electors |
| Party | Democratic-Republican | Federalist |
| Home state | Virginia | N/A |
| Running mate | Daniel D. Tompkins | N/A (Note: No candidate formally nominated) |
| Electoral vote | 25 | 0 |
| Popular vote | 6,859 | 4 |
| Percentage | 99.9% | 0.1% |
County results
Monroe
90–100%
No data
President before election
James Madison
Democratic-Republican
Elected President
James Monroe
Democratic-Republican

A presidential election was held in Virginia on November 4, 1816, as part of the 1816 United States presidential election. The Democratic-Republican ticket of the U.S. secretary of state James Monroe and the governor of New York Daniel D. Tompkins defeated the Federalist ticket. The Federalist Party failed to nominate a candidate. In the national election, Monroe easily defeated the senior U.S. senator from New York Rufus King, who received 34 votes from unpledged electors despite not being a candidate.

== General election ==
=== Summary ===
Virginia chose 25 electors on a statewide general ticket. Nineteenth-century election laws required voters to vote directly for members of the Electoral College rather than for president. This sometimes resulted in small differences in the number of votes cast for electors pledged to the same presidential candidate, if some voters did not vote for all the electors nominated by a party. This table compares the votes for the most popular elector pledged to each ticket, to give an approximate sense of the statewide result.

1816 United States presidential election in Virginia
| Party | Candidate | Votes | % |
|---|---|---|---|
| Democratic-Republican | James Monroe Daniel D. Tompkins | 6,859 | 99.94 |
| Federalist | Unpledged electors | 4 | 0.06 |
| Total votes | | 6,863 | 100.00 |

=== Results ===
1816 United States presidential election in Virginia (Note: Incomplete results based on returns from Essex, Fauquier, and Richmond counties)
| Party | Candidate | Votes |
|---|---|---|
| Democratic-Republican | Mark Alexander | 200 |
| Democratic-Republican | Branch T. Archer | 200 |
| Democratic-Republican | William Lee Ball | 200 |
| Democratic-Republican | John T. Brooke | 200 |
| Democratic-Republican | Joseph Carrington Cabell | 200 |
| Democratic-Republican | John Dixon | 200 |
| Democratic-Republican | Isaac Foster | 200 |
| Democratic-Republican | Charles G. Graves | 200 |
| Democratic-Republican | Hugh Holmes | 200 |
| Democratic-Republican | William Jones | 200 |
| Democratic-Republican | George Newton | 200 |
| Democratic-Republican | Brazure W. Pryor | 200 |
| Democratic-Republican | John Purnall | 200 |
| Democratic-Republican | Andrew Russell | 200 |
| Democratic-Republican | Archibald Stuart | 200 |
| Democratic-Republican | Charles Taylor | 200 |
| Democratic-Republican | Robert Taylor | 200 |
| Democratic-Republican | John Webster | 200 |
| Democratic-Republican | Charles Yancey | 200 |
| Democratic-Republican | John Pegram | 199 |
| Democratic-Republican | George Penn | 199 |
| Democratic-Republican | William G. Poindexter | 199 |
| Democratic-Republican | Spencer Roane | 199 |
| Democratic-Republican | Sthreshley Rennolds | 198 |
| Democratic-Republican | Archibald Rutherford | 197 |
| Federalist | Robert B. Taylor | 4 |
| Federalist | Robert White | 4 |
| None | John Scott | 3 |
| None | Enoch Mason | 3 |
| None | Thomas Nelson | 3 |
| Federalist | Robert Porterfield | 3 |
| None | Thomas Van Swearingen | 3 |
| Federalist | George Adams | 1 |
| Federalist | Charles Cameron | 1 |
| Federalist | John Campbell | 1 |
| Federalist | Paul Carrington | 1 |
| Federalist | Robert Christian | 1 |
| Federalist | Thomas Evans | 1 |
| Federalist | John M. Gannett | 1 |
| Federalist | Robert Gratton | 1 |
| Federalist | James H. Hooe | 1 |
| Federalist | Hudson Martin Sr. | 1 |
| Federalist | John Nelson | 1 |
| Federalist | Isaac Olay | 1 |
| Federalist | David Patterson | 1 |
| None | Edward Pegram | 1 |
| None | George Pegram | 1 |
| Federalist | Burt Powell | 1 |
| Federalist | Joseph T. Price | 1 |
| Federalist | Archibald Ritchie | 1 |
| Federalist | Benjamin Sheppard | 1 |
| Federalist | James Stephenson | 1 |
| Federalist | Isaac Swoop | 1 |
| Federalist | William Tate | 1 |
| None | George K. Taylor | 1 |
| Federalist | Richard T. Taylor | 1 |
| Federalist | Isaac Williams | 1 |
| Federalist | Henry Young | 1 |
| Federalist | Noah Zane | 1 |
| Democratic-Republican | William Archer (Note: Archer, Brockenbrough, Cook, Edie, and Morgan are listed as "elected" by the United States Telegraph (published 1828), but not by the original election returns.) | 0 |
| Democratic-Republican | William Brockenbrough | 0 |
| Democratic-Republican | Benjamin Cook | 0 |
| Democratic-Republican | John Edie | 0 |
| Democratic-Republican | Daniel Morgan | 0 |
| Democratic-Republican | Robert B. Starke (Note: Voted in the Electoral College) | 0 |
| Total | | ≥204 |

=== Results by county ===
| County | James Monroe Democratic-Republican | | Unpledged electors Federalist | | Margin | | Total |
| County | Votes | Percent | Votes | Percent | Votes | Percent | Total |
|---|---|---|---|---|---|---|---|
| Accomack | 5 | 100.00 | — | | 5 | 100.00 | 5 |
| Albemarle | 259 | 100.00 | — | | 259 | 100.00 | 259 |
| Amelia | 39 | 100.00 | — | | 39 | 100.00 | 39 |
| Amherst | 72 | 100.00 | — | | 72 | 100.00 | 72 |
| Augusta | 53 | 100.00 | — | | 53 | 100.00 | 53 |
| Bath | 29 | 100.00 | — | | 29 | 100.00 | 29 |
| Bedford | 84 | 100.00 | — | | 84 | 100.00 | 84 |
| Berkeley | 66 | 100.00 | — | | 66 | 100.00 | 66 |
| Botetourt | 74 | 100.00 | — | | 74 | 100.00 | 74 |
| Brooke | 90 | 100.00 | — | | 90 | 100.00 | 90 |
| Brunswick | 45 | 100.00 | — | | 45 | 100.00 | 45 |
| Buckingham | 105 | 100.00 | — | | 105 | 100.00 | 105 |
| Cabell | ** | | ** | | ** | | ** |
| Campbell | 87 | 100.00 | — | | 87 | 100.00 | 87 |
| Caroline | 58 | 100.00 | — | | 58 | 100.00 | 58 |
| Charles City | 23 | 100.00 | — | | 23 | 100.00 | 23 |
| Charlotte | 112 | 100.00 | — | | 112 | 100.00 | 112 |
| Chesterfield | 143 | 100.00 | — | | 143 | 100.00 | 143 |
| Culpepper | 75 | 100.00 | — | | 75 | 100.00 | 75 |
| Cumberland | 46 | 100.00 | — | | 46 | 100.00 | 46 |
| Dinwiddie | 30 | 100.00 | — | | 30 | 100.00 | 30 |
| Elizabeth City | 65 | 100.00 | — | | 65 | 100.00 | 65 |
| Essex | 61 | 98.39 | 1 | 1.61 | 60 | 96.78 | 62 |
| Fairfax | 93 | 100.00 | — | | 93 | 100.00 | 93 |
| Fauquier | 65 | 95.59 | 3 | 4.41 | 62 | 91.18 | 68 |
| Fluvanna | 45 | 100.00 | — | | 45 | 100.00 | 45 |
| Franklin | 106 | 100.00 | — | | 106 | 100.00 | 106 |
| Frederick | 146 | 100.00 | — | | 146 | 100.00 | 146 |
| Giles | 25 | 100.00 | — | | 25 | 100.00 | 25 |
| Gloucester | 144 | 100.00 | — | | 144 | 100.00 | 144 |
| Goochland | 51 | 100.00 | — | | 51 | 100.00 | 51 |
| Grayson | 49 | 100.00 | — | | 49 | 100.00 | 49 |
| Greenbrier | 17 | 100.00 | — | | 17 | 100.00 | 17 |
| Halifax | 83 | 100.00 | — | | 83 | 100.00 | 83 |
| Hampshire | 6 | 100.00 | — | | 6 | 100.00 | 6 |
| Hanover | 39 | 100.00 | — | | 39 | 100.00 | 39 |
| Hardy | 8 | 100.00 | — | | 8 | 100.00 | 8 |
| Harrison | 96 | 100.00 | — | | 96 | 100.00 | 96 |
| Henrico | 242 | 100.00 | — | | 242 | 100.00 | 242 |
| Henry | 24 | 100.00 | — | | 24 | 100.00 | 24 |
| Isle of Wight | 160 | 100.00 | — | | 160 | 100.00 | 160 |
| James City | 67 | 100.00 | — | | 67 | 100.00 | 67 |
| Jefferson | 30 | 100.00 | — | | 30 | 100.00 | 30 |
| Kanawha | ** | | ** | | ** | | ** |
| King and Queen | 79 | 100.00 | — | | 79 | 100.00 | 79 |
| King George | 63 | 100.00 | — | | 63 | 100.00 | 63 |
| King William | 36 | 100.00 | — | | 36 | 100.00 | 36 |
| Lancaster | 96 | 100.00 | — | | 96 | 100.00 | 96 |
| Lee | ** | | ** | | ** | | * |
| Lewis | ** | | ** | | ** | | ** |
| Loudoun | 66 | 100.00 | — | | 66 | 100.00 | 66 |
| Louisa | 102 | 100.00 | — | | 102 | 100.00 | 102 |
| Lunenburg | 47 | 100.00 | — | | 47 | 100.00 | 47 |
| Madison | 98 | 100.00 | — | | 98 | 100.00 | 98 |
| Mason | 68 | 100.00 | — | | 68 | 100.00 | 68 |
| Mathews | 27 | 100.00 | — | | 27 | 100.00 | 27 |
| Mecklenburg | 69 | 100.00 | — | | 69 | 100.00 | 69 |
| Middlesex | 105 | 100.00 | — | | 105 | 100.00 | 105 |
| Monongalia | ** | | ** | | ** | | ** |
| Monroe | 55 | 100.00 | — | | 55 | 100.00 | 55 |
| Montgomery | ** | | ** | | ** | | ** |
| Nansemond | 39 | 100.00 | — | | 39 | 100.00 | 39 |
| Nelson | 49 | 100.00 | — | | 49 | 100.00 | 49 |
| New Kent | 26 | 100.00 | — | | 26 | 100.00 | 26 |
| Norfolk | 213 | 100.00 | — | | 213 | 100.00 | 213 |
| Northampton | ** | | ** | | ** | | ** |
| Northumberland | 139 | 100.00 | — | | 139 | 100.00 | 139 |
| Nottoway | 49 | 100.00 | — | | 49 | 100.00 | 49 |
| Ohio | 38 | 100.00 | — | | 38 | 100.00 | 38 |
| Orange | 74 | 100.00 | — | | 74 | 100.00 | 74 |
| Patrick | 59 | 100.00 | — | | 59 | 100.00 | 59 |
| Pendleton | 94 | 100.00 | — | | 94 | 100.00 | 94 |
| Pittsylvania | 104 | 100.00 | — | | 104 | 100.00 | 104 |
| Powhatan | ** | | ** | | ** | | ** |
| Prince Edward | 52 | 100.00 | — | | 52 | 100.00 | 52 |
| Prince George | 145 | 100.00 | — | | 145 | 100.00 | 145 |
| Prince William | 63 | 100.00 | — | | 63 | 100.00 | 63 |
| Princess Anne | 84 | 100.00 | — | | 84 | 100.00 | 84 |
| Randolph | ** | | ** | | ** | | ** |
| Richmond | 74 | 100.00 | — | | 74 | 100.00 | 74 |
| Rockbridge | 127 | 100.00 | — | | 127 | 100.00 | 127 |
| Rockingham | 107 | 100.00 | — | | 107 | 100.00 | 107 |
| Russell | ** | | ** | | ** | | ** |
| Scott | 13 | 100.00 | — | | 13 | 100.00 | 13 |
| Shenandoah | 260 | 100.00 | — | | 260 | 100.00 | 260 |
| Southampton | 91 | 100.00 | — | | 91 | 100.00 | 91 |
| Spotsylvania | 111 | 100.00 | — | | 111 | 100.00 | 111 |
| Stafford | 62 | 100.00 | — | | 62 | 100.00 | 62 |
| Surry | 52 | 100.00 | — | | 52 | 100.00 | 52 |
| Sussex | 88 | 100.00 | — | | 88 | 100.00 | 88 |
| Tazewell | 32 | 100.00 | — | | 32 | 100.00 | 32 |
| Tyler | 63 | 100.00 | — | | 63 | 100.00 | 63 |
| Warwick | 49 | 100.00 | — | | 49 | 100.00 | 49 |
| Washington | 97 | 100.00 | — | | 97 | 100.00 | 97 |
| Westmoreland | 38 | 100.00 | — | | 38 | 100.00 | 38 |
| City of Williamsburg | 29 | 100.00 | — | | 29 | 100.00 | 29 |
| Wood | 169 | 100.00 | — | | 169 | 100.00 | 169 |
| Wythe | 25 | 100.00 | — | | 25 | 100.00 | 25 |
| York | 42 | 100.00 | — | | 42 | 100.00 | 42 |
| TOTAL | 6,859 | 99.94 | 4 | 0.06 | 6,855 | 99.88 | 6,863 |

=== Electoral college ===
1816 United States Electoral College vote in Virginia
| For president | | | | For vice president | | | |
| Candidate | Party | Home state | Electoral vote | Candidate | Party | Home state | Electoral vote |
|---|---|---|---|---|---|---|---|
| James Monroe | Democratic-Republican | Virginia | 25 | Daniel D. Tompkins | Democratic-Republican | New York | 25 |
| Total | | | 25 | Total | | | 25 |

== See also ==
- United States presidential elections in Virginia

== Bibliography ==
- Dubin, Michael J. (2002). United States Presidential Elections, 1788–1860: The Official Results by County and State. Jefferson, NC: McFarland & Co.
- Lampi, Philip J. (n.d.). "Electoral College". A New Nation Votes. American Antiquarian Society.
- Lampi, Philip J. (January 11, 2012). "Virginia 1816 Electoral College". A New Nation Votes. American Antiquarian Society.
- National Archives and Records Administration (n.d.). "1816 Electoral College Results". National Archives.
- Ratcliffe, Donald J. (Spring 2014). "Popular Preferences in the Presidential Election of 1824". Journal of the Early Republic. 34 (1): 45–77. JSTOR 24486931.
- Turner, Lynn W. (2002). "Elections of 1816 and 1820". In Schlesinger, Arthur M. Jr.; Israel, Fred L. (eds.). History of American Presidential Elections, 1789–2001. Vol. 1. Philadelphia: Chelsea House Publishers. pp. 298–345.
