= 1872 United States presidential election in Virginia =

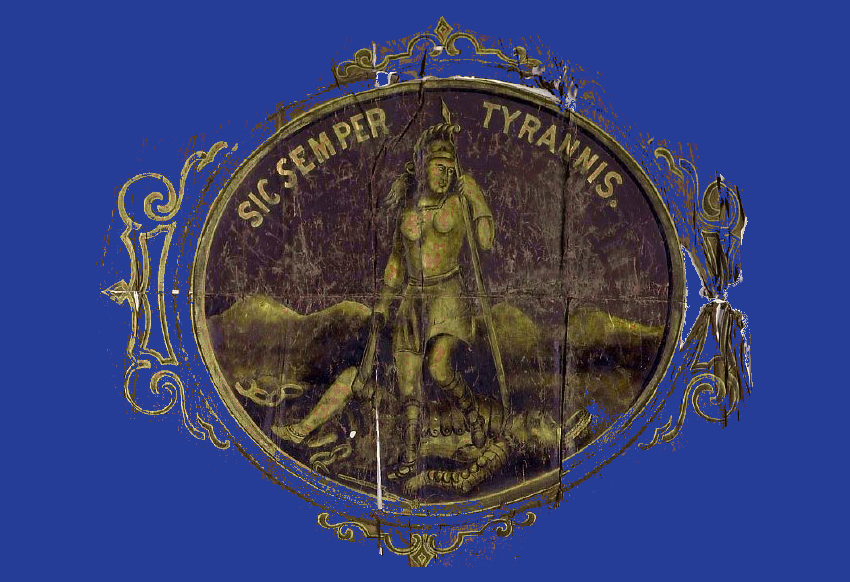
- November 5, 1872
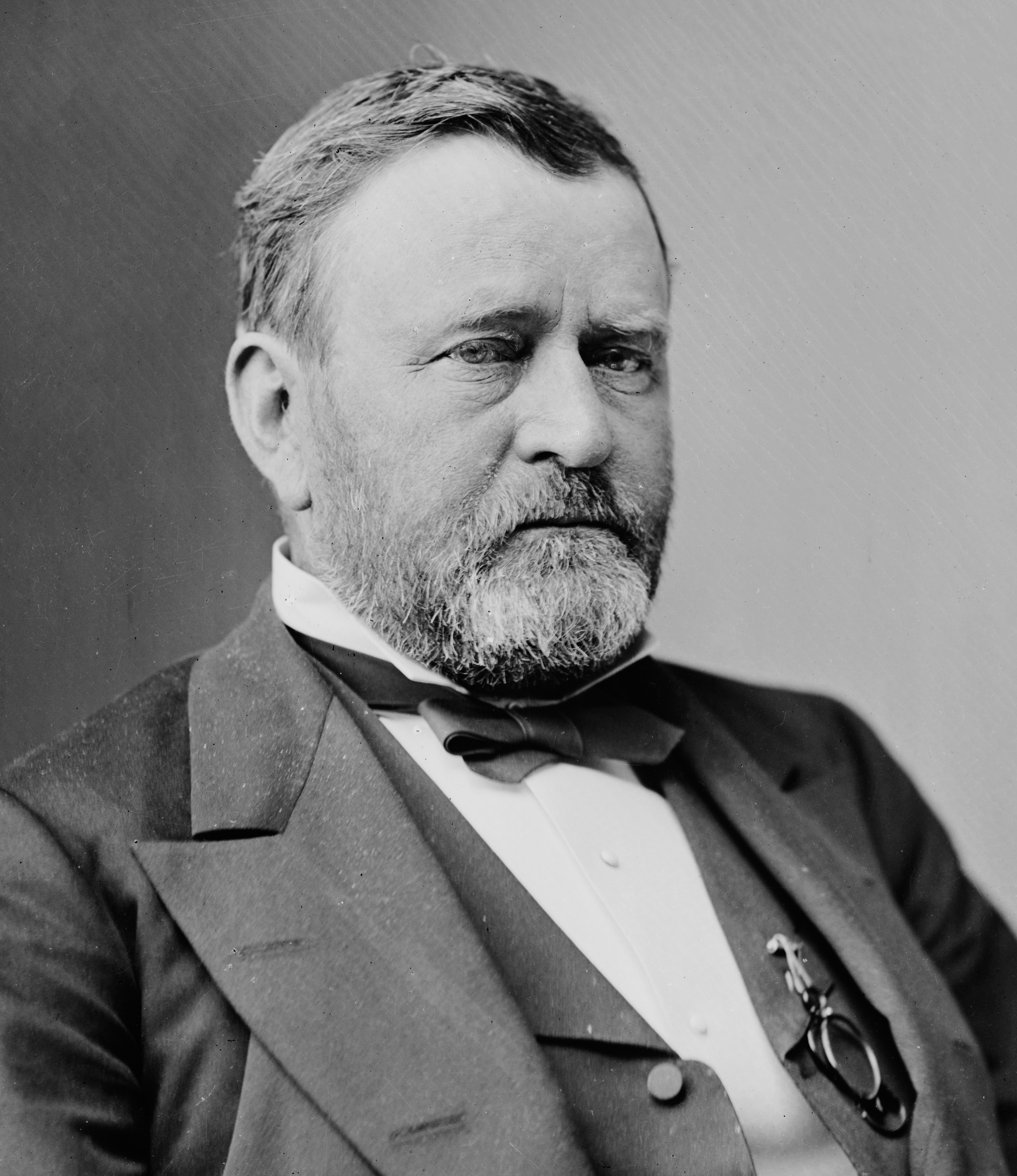

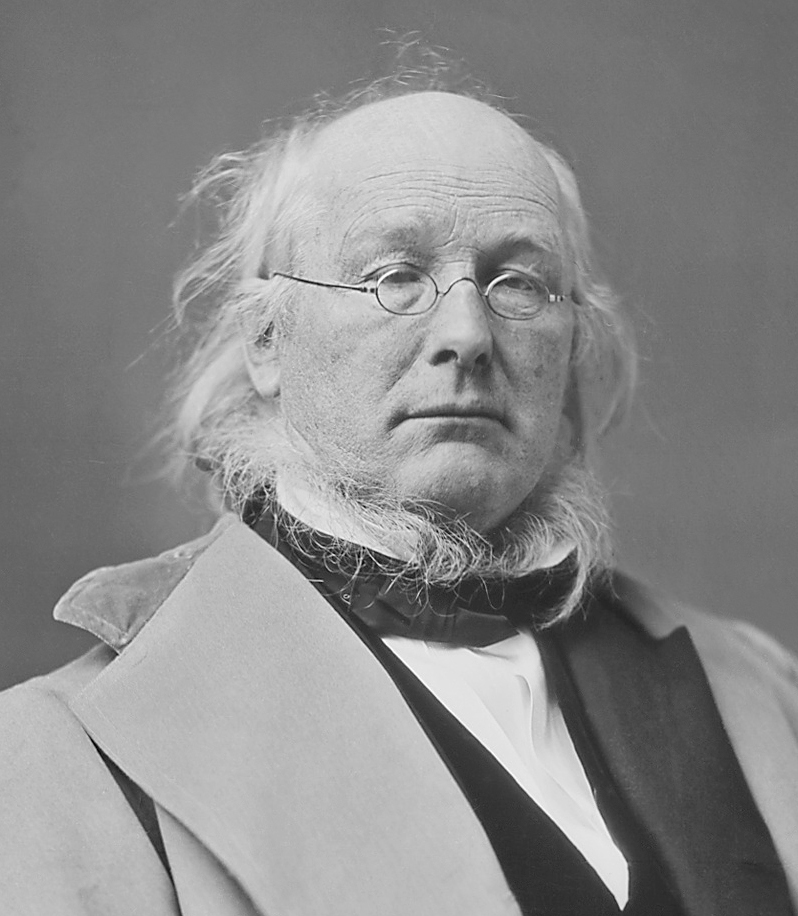
Nominee	Ulysses S. Grant	Horace Greeley
Party	Republican	Liberal Republican
Home state	Illinois	New York
Running mate	Henry Wilson	Benjamin G. Brown
Electoral vote	11	0
Popular vote	93,463	91,647
Percentage	50.47%	49.49%
County and independent city results
Grant
50–60%
60–70%
70–80%
Greeley
50–60%
60–70%
70–80%
80–90%
Tie
President before election
Ulysses S. Grant
Republican
Elected President
Ulysses S. Grant
Republican

The 1872 United States presidential election in Virginia took place on November 5, 1872, as part of the 1872 United States presidential election. Voters chose 11 representatives, or electors to the Electoral College, who voted for president and vice president.

Virginia voted for the Republican candidate, incumbent President Ulysses S. Grant over the Democratic and Liberal Republican candidate, former U.S. Representative Horace Greeley. This was the first presidential election that Virginia participated in after the events of the U.S. Civil War, and also the first election where West Virginia was not a part of the state. It was also the first presidential election in which the state voted for a Republican candidate, which would not occur again until 1928. The election was still very close in this state and Grant won Virginia by a margin of 0.98%.

== Results ==
1872 United States presidential election in Virginia
Party	Candidate	Votes	Percentage	Electoral votes
Republican	Ulysses S. Grant (inc.)	93,463	50.47%	11
Liberal Republican/Democratic	Horace Greeley	91,647	49.49%	0
Bourbon Democrat	Charles O'Conor	85	0.05%	0
Totals		185,195	100.0%	11

== See also ==
- United States presidential elections in Virginia
