= 1828 United States presidential election in Virginia =

- October 31 – December 2, 1828

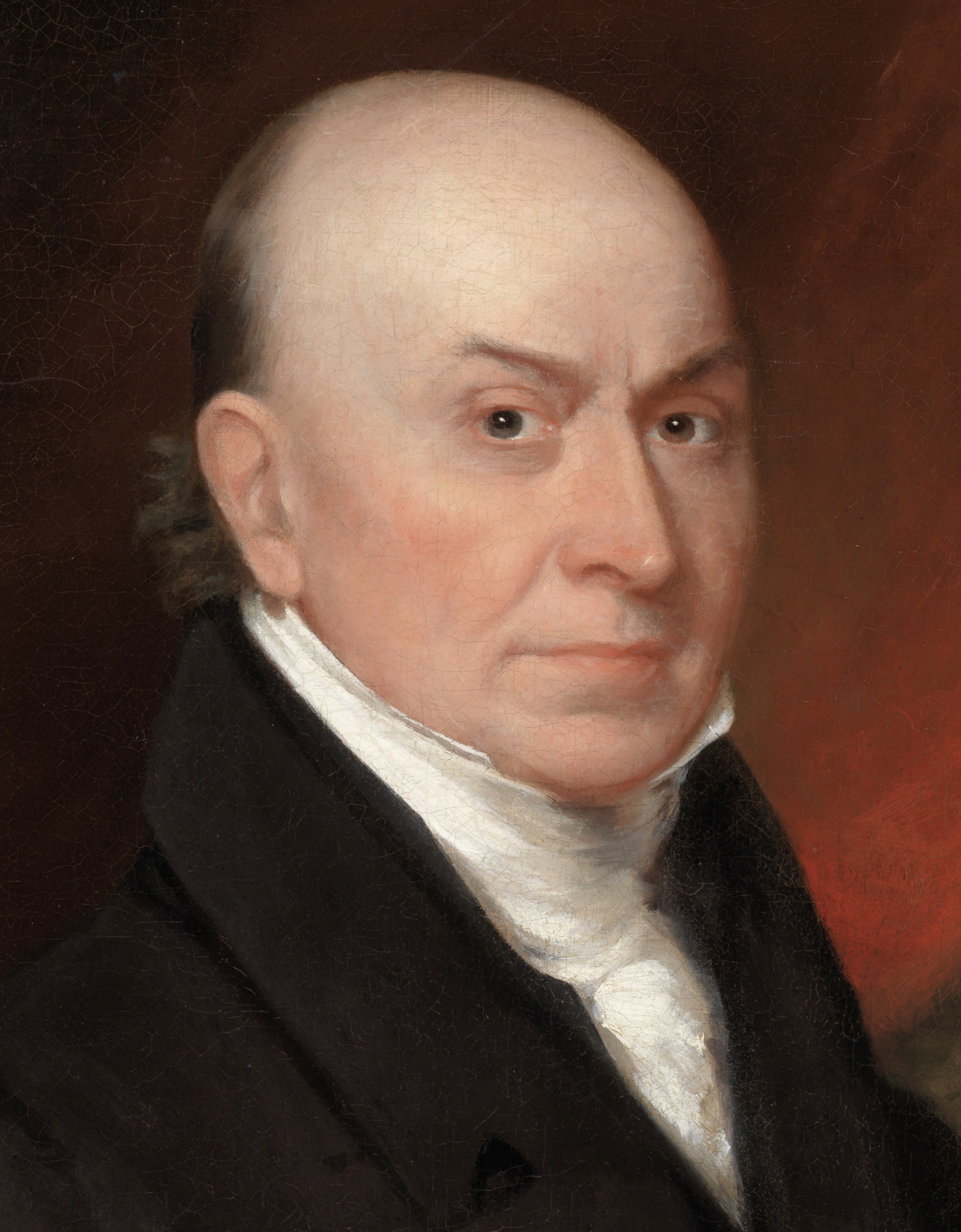
Nominee	Andrew Jackson	John Quincy Adams
Party	Democratic	National Republican
Home state	Tennessee	Massachusetts
Running mate	John C. Calhoun	Richard Rush
Electoral vote	24	0
Popular vote	26,854	12,070
Percentage	68.99%	31.01%
County results
Jackson
50–60%
60–70%
70–80%
80–90%
90–100%
Adams
50–60%
60–70%
70–80%
80–90%
President before election
John Quincy Adams
National Republican
Elected President
Andrew Jackson
Democratic

The 1828 United States presidential election in Virginia took place between October 31 and December 2, 1828, as part of the 1828 United States presidential election. Voters chose 24 representatives, or electors to the Electoral College, who voted for President and Vice President.

Virginia voted for the Democratic candidate, Andrew Jackson, over the National Republican candidate, incumbent President John Quincy Adams. Jackson won Virginia by a margin of 37.98%.

== Results ==
1828 United States presidential election in Virginia
Party	Candidate	Votes	Percentage	Electoral votes
Democratic	Andrew Jackson	26,854	68.99%	24
National Republican	John Quincy Adams (inc.)	12,070	31.01%	0
Totals		38,924	100.0%	24

== See also ==
- United States presidential elections in Virginia
