= 1856 United States presidential election in Virginia =

- November 4, 1856
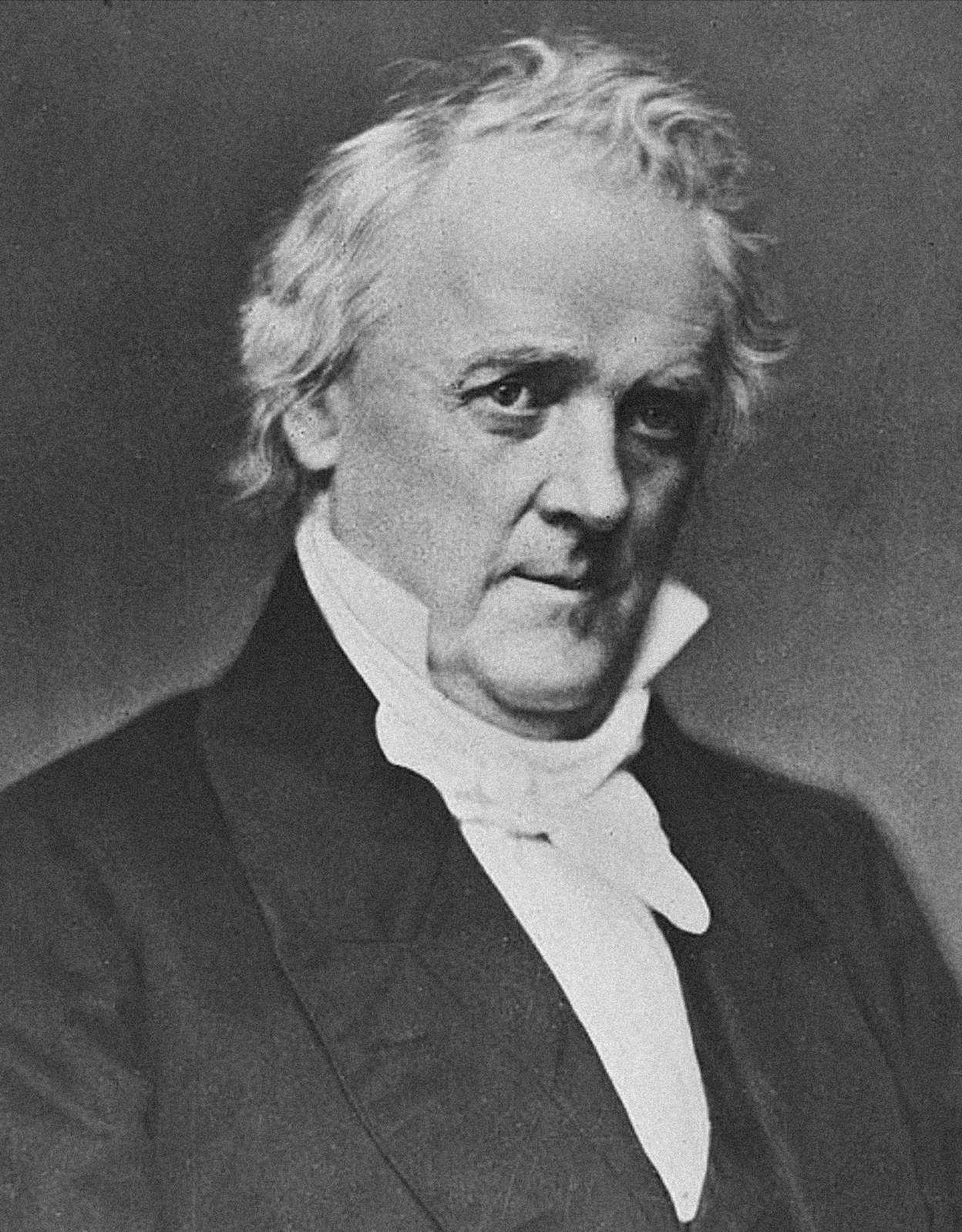

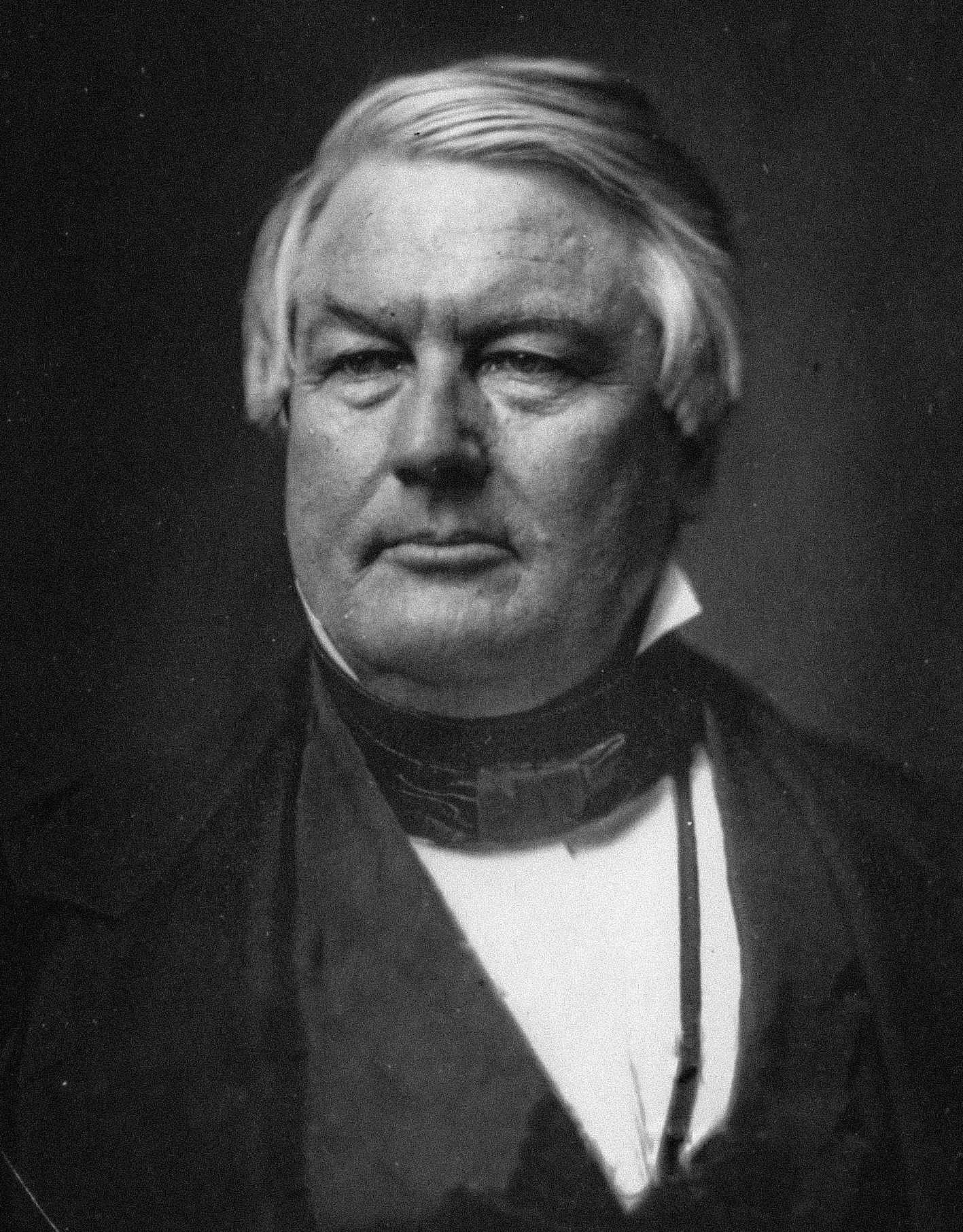
Nominee	James Buchanan	Millard Fillmore
Party	Democratic	Know Nothing
Home state	Pennsylvania	New York
Running mate	John C. Breckinridge	Andrew Jackson Donelson
Electoral vote	15	0
Popular vote	90,083	60,150
Percentage	59.96%	40.04%
County results
Buchanan
50–60%
60–70%
70–80%
80–90%
90–100%
Fillmore
50–60%
60–70%
70–80%
President before election
Franklin Pierce
Democratic
Elected President
James Buchanan
Democratic

The 1856 United States presidential election in Virginia took place on November 4, 1856, as part of the 1856 United States presidential election. Voters chose 15 representatives, or electors to the Electoral College, who voted for president and vice president.

Virginia voted for the Democratic candidate, former United States Minister to the United Kingdom James Buchanan over the American candidate, former President Millard Fillmore. Former U.S. Senator John C. Frémont was also the Republican candidate in this election, but he was not on the ballot in the state. Buchanan won Virginia with a margin of 19.92%.

== Campaign ==
John Curtiss Underwood, George Rye, and H. Carpenter were the state's delegates to the 1856 Republican National Convention. They wanted to cast forty-five votes, three per congressional district and six at-large, but the convention only allotted them nine votes. They refused to vote in protest on both ballots. The delegation initially supported David Wilmot for the vice-presidential nomination, but later supported William L. Dayton. The Republican Party of Virginia held its first state convention on September 18, 1856, while Underwood was in another state due to threats of violence. William E. Stevenson, a future governor of West Virginia, was indicted for distributing an anti-slavery pamphlet.

John C. Frémont received 291 votes in the state. 280 votes came from the northwest, 5 from Shenandoah County, 5 from Scott County, and one from Alexandria, Virginia.

Democrats would not win Preston County and Upshur County again until 1964 (as part of West Virginia).

== Results ==
1856 United States presidential election in Virginia
Party	Candidate	Votes	Percentage	Electoral votes
Democratic	James Buchanan	90,083	59.96%	15
American	Millard Fillmore	60,150	40.04%	0
Totals		150,233	100.00%	15

== See also ==
- United States presidential elections in Virginia

== Works cited ==
- Lowe, Richard (1973). "The Republican Party in Antebellum Virginia, 1856-1860". The Virginia Magazine of History and Biography. 81 (3). Virginia Historical Society: 259–79. doi:10.2307/4247810. JSTOR 4247810.
