= 1836 United States presidential election in Virginia =

- November 7, 1836
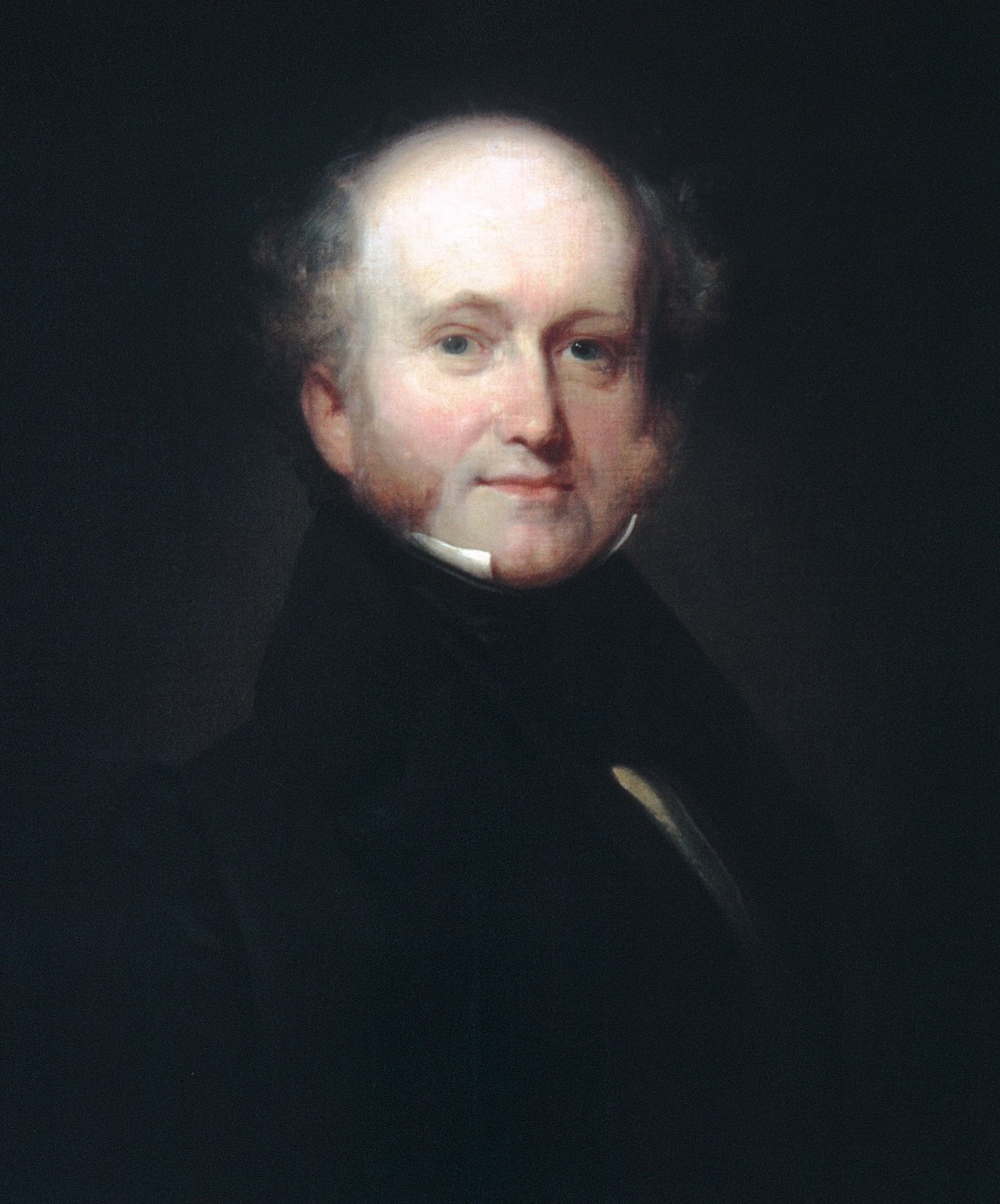

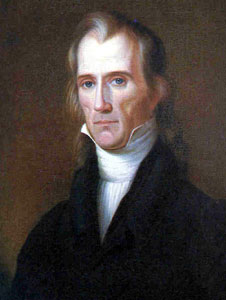
Nominee	Martin Van Buren	Hugh Lawson White
Party	Democratic	Whig
Home state	New York	Tennessee
Running mate	William Smith	John Tyler
Electoral vote	23	0
Popular vote	30,556	23,384
Percentage	56.64%	43.35%
County results
Van Buren
50–60%
60–70%
70–80%
80–90%
90–100%
White
50–60%
60–70%
70–80%
80–90%
90–100%
Unknown/No Vote
President before election
Andrew Jackson
Democratic
Elected President
Martin Van Buren
Democratic

A presidential election was held in Virginia on November 7, 1836 as part of the 1836 United States presidential election. Voters chose 23 representatives, or electors to the Electoral College, who voted for President and Vice President.

Virginia voted for the Democratic candidate, Martin Van Buren, over Whig candidate Hugh Lawson White. Van Buren won Virginia by a margin of 13.29%. While Van Buren's national running mate was Richard Mentor Johnson, the Virginia Democratic electors refused to support his candidacy and voted for William Smith of South Carolina.

== Results ==
1836 United States presidential election in Virginia
Party	Candidate	Votes	Percentage	Electoral votes
Democratic	Martin Van Buren	30,556	56.64%	23
Whig	Hugh Lawson White	23,384	43.35%	0
N/A	Others	5	0.01%	0
Totals		53,945	100.00%	23

== See also ==
- United States presidential elections in Virginia
