= 1840 United States presidential election in Virginia =

- November 2, 1840
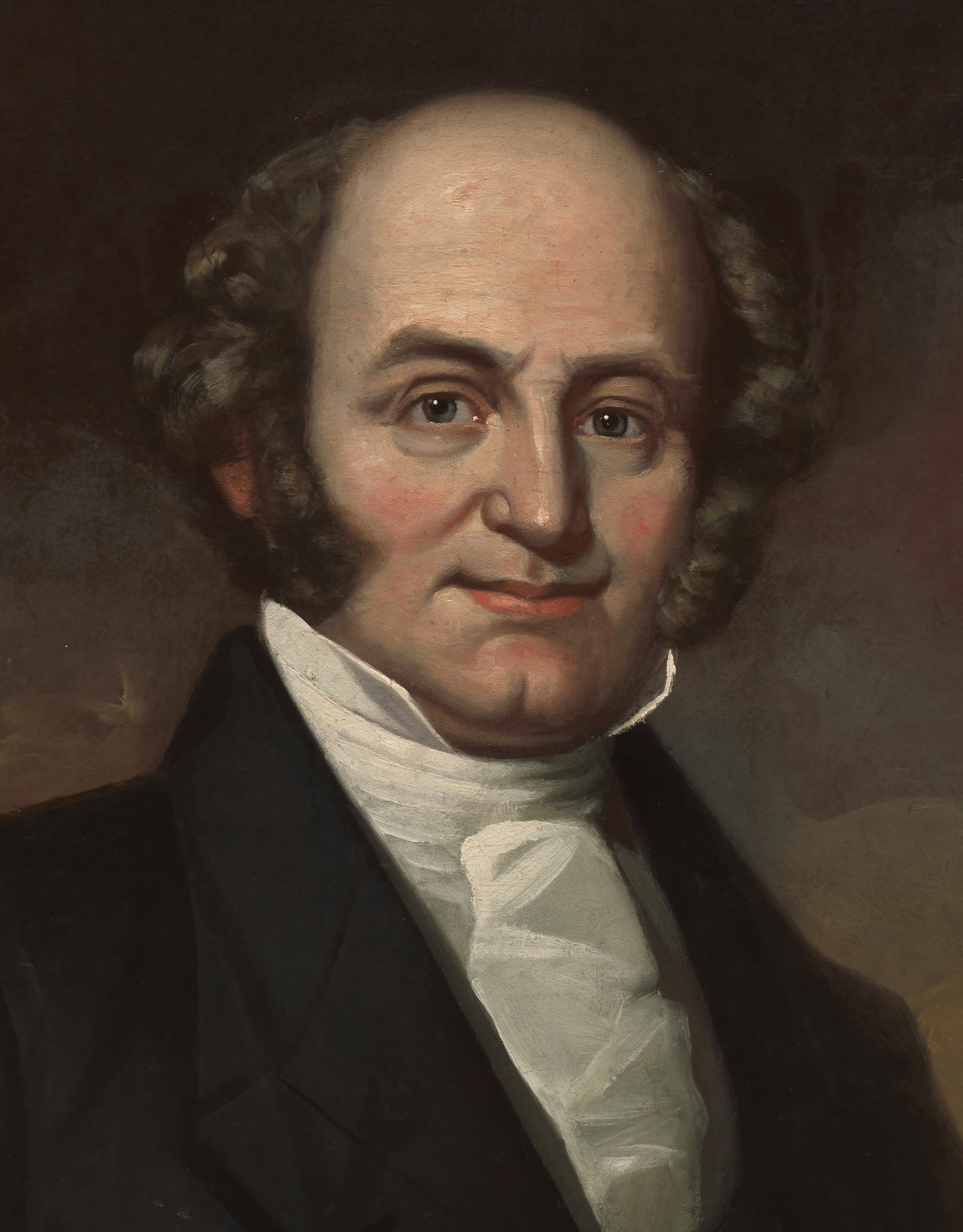

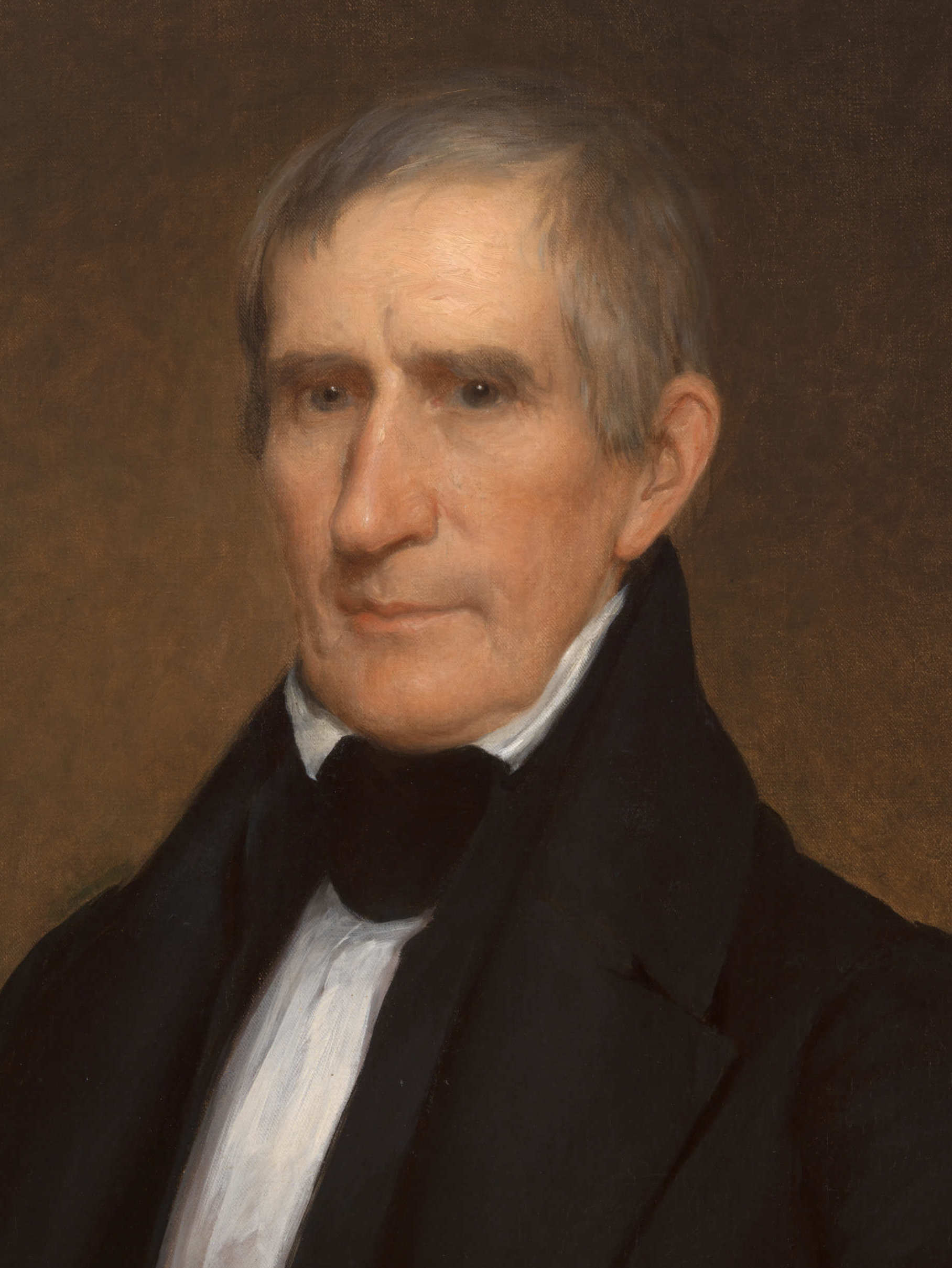
| Nominee | Martin Van Buren | William Henry Harrison |
| Party | Democratic | Whig |
| Home state | New York | Ohio |
| Running mate | Richard Mentor Johnson | John Tyler |
| Electoral vote | 23 | 0 |
| Popular vote | 43,757 | 42,637 |
| Percentage | 50.65% | 49.35% |
County results
Van Buren
50–60%
60–70%
70–80%
80–90%
90–100%
Harrison
50–60%
60–70%
70–80%
80–90%
90–100%
President before election
Martin Van Buren
Democratic
Elected President
William Henry Harrison
Whig

A presidential election was held in Virginia on November 2, 1840 as part of the 1840 United States presidential election. Voters chose 23 representatives, or electors to the Electoral College, who voted for President and Vice President.

Virginia voted for the Democratic candidate, incumbent President Martin Van Buren, over Whig candidate William Henry Harrison. Van Buren narrowly won Virginia by a margin of 1.3%, or 1,120 votes.

One Faithless elector from Virginia refused to support the current Vice President Richard Mentor Johnson, instead voting for James K. Polk of Tennessee for Vice President.

== Results ==
1840 United States presidential election in Virginia
| Party | Candidate | Votes | Percentage | Electoral votes |
|---|---|---|---|---|
| Democratic | Martin Van Buren (inc.) | 43,757 | 50.65% | 23 |
| Whig | William Henry Harrison | 42,637 | 49.35% | 0 |
| Totals | | 86,394 | 100.0% | 23 |

1840 United States vice presidential election in Virginia
| Party | Candidate | Electoral votes |
|---|---|---|
| Democratic | Richard Mentor Johnson (inc.) | 22 |
| Whig | John Tyler | 0 |
| Democratic | James K. Polk | 1 |
| Totals | | 23 |

== See also ==
- United States presidential elections in Virginia
