= 1832 United States presidential election in Virginia =

- November 2 – December 5, 1832
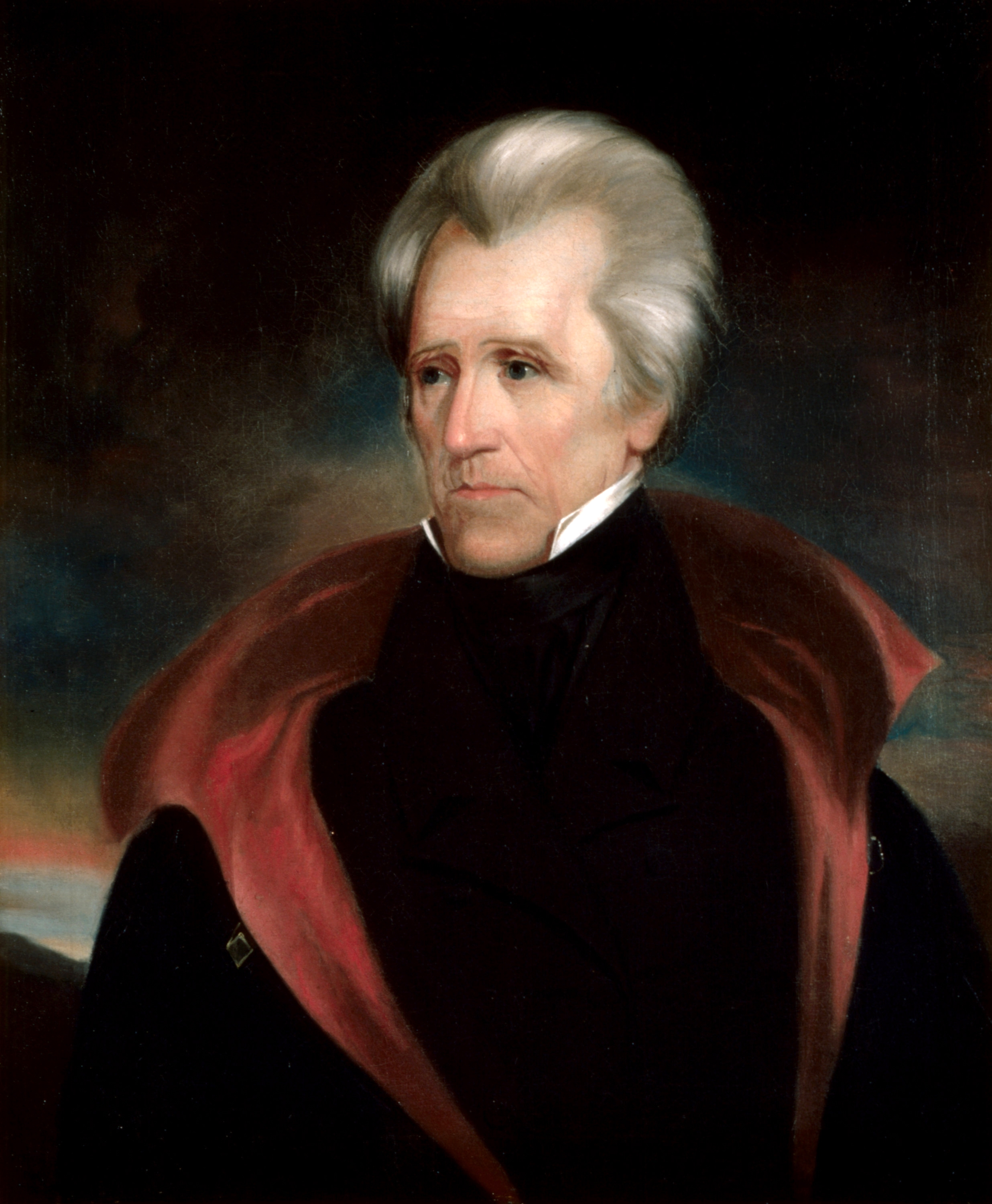

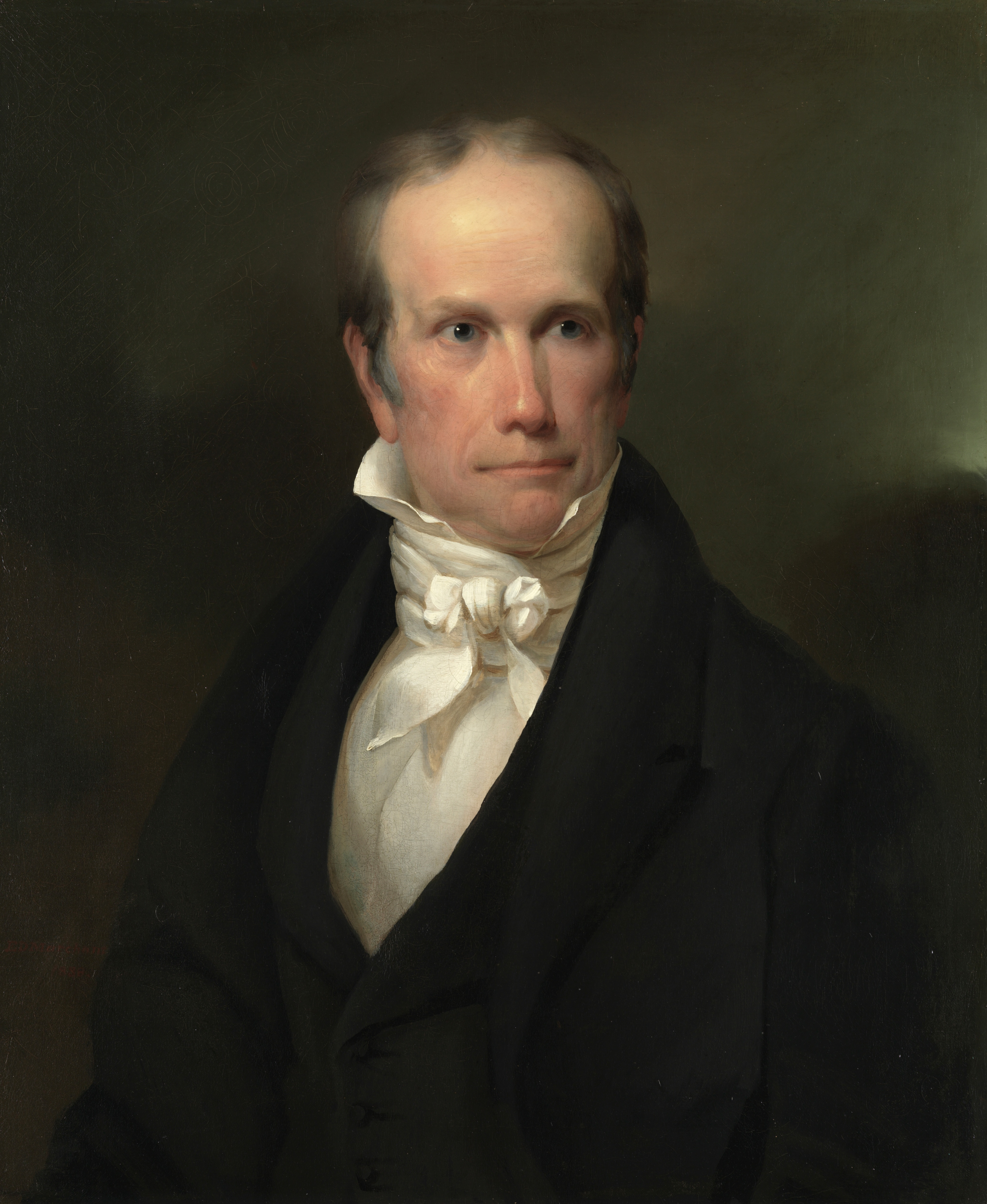
Nominee	Andrew Jackson	Henry Clay
Party	Democratic	National Republican
Home state	Tennessee	Kentucky
Running mate	Martin Van Buren	John Sergeant
Electoral vote	23	0
Popular vote	34,243	11,436
Percentage	74.96%	25.03%
County results
Jackson
50–60%
60–70%
70–80%
80–90%
90–100%
Clay
50–60%
60–70%
70–80%
No Data/Vote
President before election
Andrew Jackson
Democratic
Elected President
Andrew Jackson
Democratic

The 1832 United States presidential election in Virginia took place between November 2 and December 5, 1832, as part of the 1832 United States presidential election. Voters chose 23 representatives, or electors to the Electoral College, who voted for President and Vice President.

Virginia voted for the Democratic Party candidate, incumbent President Andrew Jackson, over the National Republican candidate, Henry Clay, and the Anti-Masonic Party candidate, William Wirt. Jackson won Virginia by a margin of 49.93%.

== Results ==
1832 United States presidential election in Virginia
Party	Candidate	Votes	Percentage	Electoral votes
Democratic	Andrew Jackson (inc.)	34,243	74.96%	23
National Republican	Henry Clay	11,436	25.03%	0
Anti-Masonic	William Wirt	3	0.01%	0
Totals		45,682	100.0%	23

== See also ==
- United States presidential elections in Virginia
