= 1796 United States presidential election in Virginia =

- November 4 – December 7, 1796
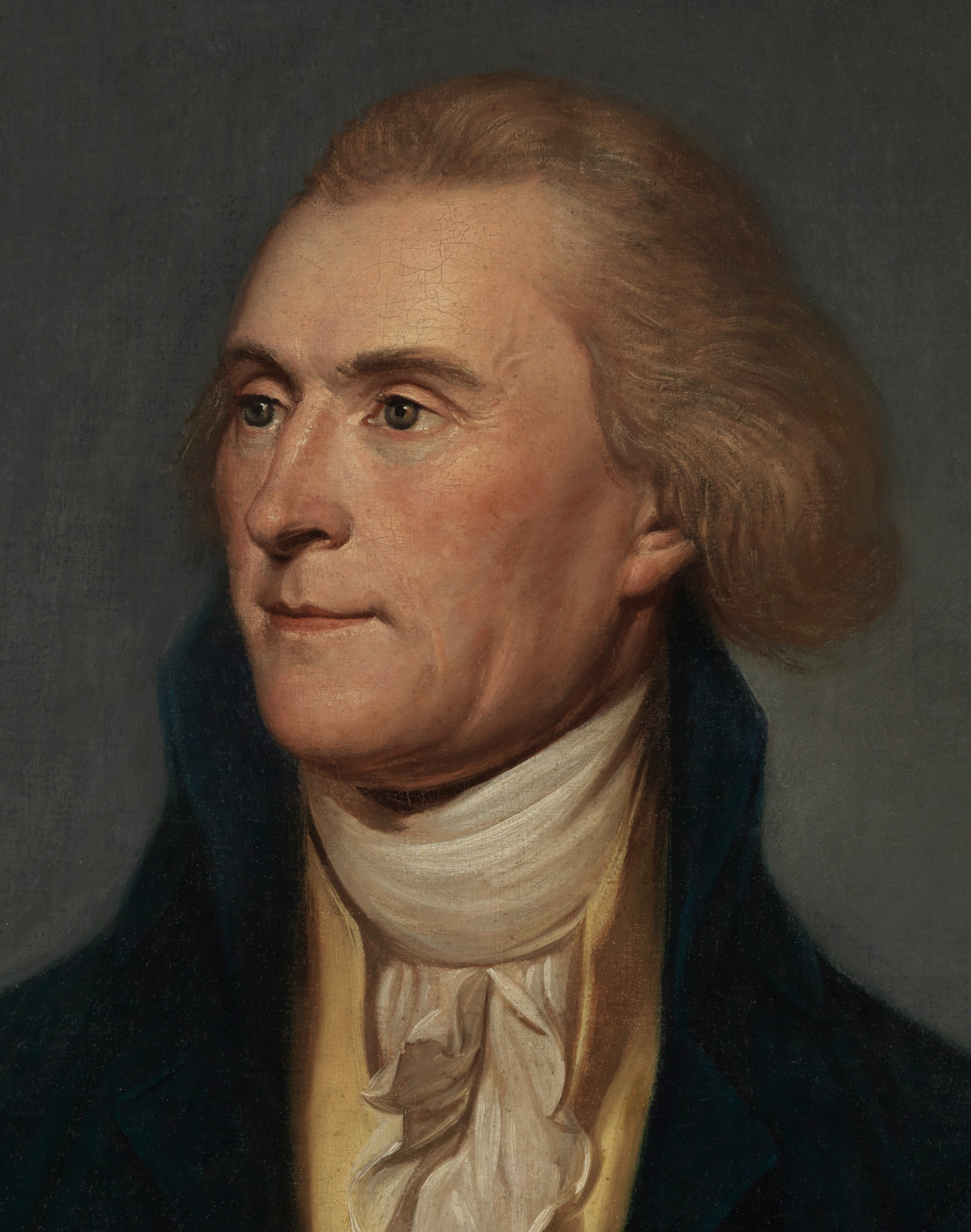

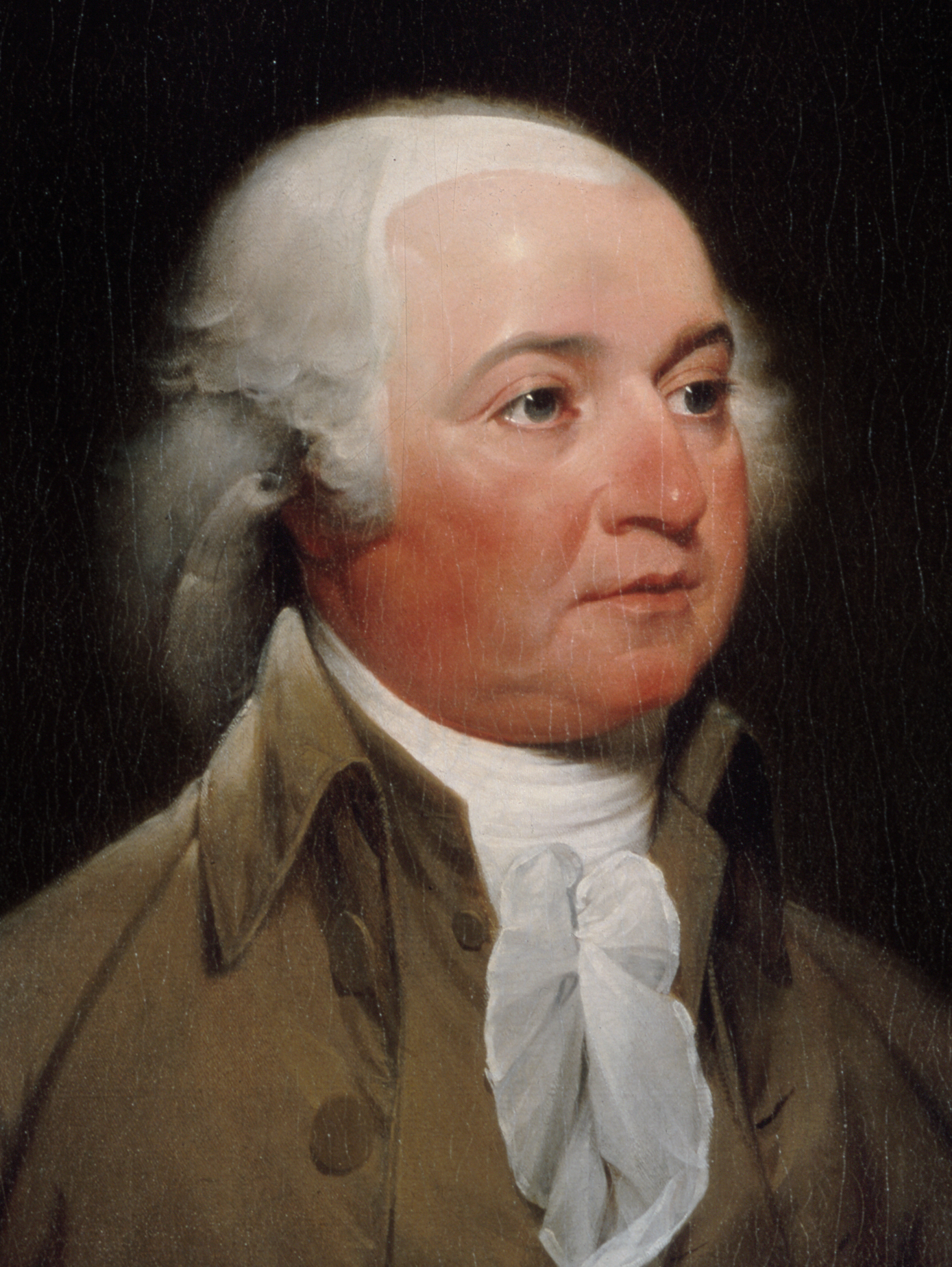
Nominee	Thomas Jefferson	John Adams
Party	Democratic-Republican	Federalist
Home state	Virginia	Massachusetts
Electoral vote	20	1
Popular vote	3,897	1,877
Percentage	67.49%	32.51%
County results
Jefferson
60–70%
70–80%
80–90%
90–100%
Adams
50–60%
60–70%
70–80%
80–90%
No Data/Vote
President before election
George Washington
Nonpartisan
Elected President
John Adams
Federalist

A presidential election was held in Virginia between November 4 to December 7, 1796, as part of the 1796 United States presidential election. Voters chose 21 representatives, or electors to the Electoral College, who voted for President and Vice President.

Virginia voted for the Democratic-Republican candidate and Virginia native, Thomas Jefferson, over the Federalist candidate, John Adams. Jefferson won Virginia by a margin of 36.72%. Virginia chose electors by popular vote per electoral district and as such granted 1 electoral vote to John Adams.

Prior to the 12th Amendment, electors cast two votes, making no distinction if they were voting for Vice President or President, as such: Thomas Pinckney received 1 electoral vote, Aaron Burr received 1 electoral vote, Samuel Adams received 15 electoral votes, George Clinton received 3 electoral votes and George Washington received 1 electoral vote. It was well-known in 1796 that Jefferson and Adams were intended to be elected as president and Burr and Pinckney for vice president.

== Results ==
1796 United States presidential election in Virginia
Party	Candidate	Votes	%
Democratic-Republican	Thomas Jefferson	3,897	67.49%
Federalist	John Adams	1,877	32.51%
Total votes		5,774	100.00%

=== Results by county ===
1796 United States presidential election in Virginia
County	Thomas Jefferson Democratic-Republican		John Adams Federalist		Margin		Total (Note: Direct results for Thomas Jefferson and John Adams are taken from all electors with either a formal ticket pledge, or a submitted electoral vote, for each county.) (Note: Some county results are missing or incomplete.)
County	#	%	#	%	#	%	Total
Accomack	No data		No data		No data		
Albemarle	-	100.00%	-	0.00%	-	100.00%	-
Amelia	No data		No data		No data		
Amherst	-	100.00%	-	0.00%	-	100.00%	-
Augusta	-	100.00%	-	0.00%	-	100.00%	-
Bath	120	100.00%	0	0.00%	120	100.00%	120
Bedford	-	100.00%	-	0.00%	-	100.00%	-
Berkeley	357	80.22%	88	19.78%	269	60.44%	445
Botetourt	-	100.00%	-	0.00%	-	100.00%	-
Brooke	-	100.00%	-	0.00%	-	100.00%	-
Brunswick	322	70.93%	132	29.07%	190	41.86%	454
Buckingham	145	100.00%	0	0.00%	145	100.00%	145
Campbell	-	100.00%	-	0.00%	-	100.00%	-
Caroline	-	100.00%	-	0.00%	-	100.00%	-
Charles City	35	21.60%	127	78.40%	-92	-56.80%	162
Charlotte	-	100.00%	-	0.00%	-	100.00%	-
Chesterfield	No data		No data		No data		
Culpeper	No data		No data		No data		
Cumberland	195	100.00%	0	0.00%	195	100.00%	195
Dinwiddie	317	98.14%	6	1.86%	311	96.28%	323
Elizabeth City	5	8.62%	53	91.38%	-48	-82.76%	58
Essex	217	90.79%	22	9.21%	-195	-81.58%	239
Fairfax	171	48.03%	185	51.97%	-14	-3.94%	356
Fauquier	142	44.79%	175	55.21%	-33	-10.42%	317
Fluvanna	-	100.00%	-	0.00%	-	100.00%	-
Franklin	-	100.00%	-	0.00%	-	100.00%	-
Frederick	51	27.13%	137	72.87%	-86	-45.74%	188
Gloucester	No data		No data		No data		
Goochland	-	100.00%	-	0.00%	-	100.00%	-
Grayson	-	100.00%	-	0.00%	-	100.00%	-
Greenbrier	-	100.00%	-	0.00%	-	100.00%	-
Greensville	No data		No data		No data		
Halifax	-	100.00%	-	0.00%	-	100.00%	-
Hampshire	-	100.00%	-	0.00%	-	100.00%	-
Hanover	-	100.00%	-	0.00%	-	100.00%	-
Hardy	-	100.00%	-	0.00%	-	100.00%	-
Harrison	-	100.00%	-	0.00%	-	100.00%	-
Henrico	150	48.39%	160	51.61%	-10	-3.22%	310
Henry	-	100.00%	-	0.00%	-	100.00%	-
Isle of Wight	-	100.00%	-	0.00%	-	100.00%	-
James City	77	81.91%	17	18.09%	60	63.82%	94
Kanawha	-	100.00%	-	0.00%	-	100.00%	-
King and Queen	No data		No data		No data		
King George	-	100.00%	-	0.00%	-	100.00%	-
King William	No data		No data		No data		
Lancaster	-	100.00%	-	0.00%	-	100.00%	-
Lee	-	100.00%	-	0.00%	-	100.00%	-
Loudoun	450	76.53%	138	23.47%	312	53.06%	588
Louisa	-	100.00%	-	0.00%	-	100.00%	-
Lunenburg	71	100.00%	0	0.00%	71	100.00%	71
Madison	No data		No data		No data		
Mathews	No data		No data		No data		
Mecklenburg	54	12.86%	366	87.14%	-312	-74.28%	420
Middlesex	No data		No data		No data		
Monongalia	-	100.00%	-	0.00%	-	100.00%	-
Montgomery	-	100.00%	-	0.00%	-	100.00%	-
Nansemond	-	100.00%	-	0.00%	-	100.00%	-
New Kent	60	42.86%	80	57.14%	-20	-14.28%	140
Norfolk	-	100.00%	-	0.00%	-	100.00%	-
Northampton	No data		No data		No data		
Northumberland	-	100.00%	-	0.00%	-	100.00%	-
Nottoway	No data		No data		No data		
Ohio	-	100.00%	-	0.00%	-	100.00%	-
Orange	90	100.00%	0	0.00%	90	100.00%	90
Patrick	-	100.00%	-	0.00%	-	100.00%	-
Pendleton	-	100.00%	-	0.00%	-	100.00%	-
Pittsylvania	-	100.00%	-	0.00%	-	100.00%	-
Powhatan	28	17.94%	128	82.06%	-100	-64.12%	156
Prince Edward	117	100.00%	0	0.00%	117	100.00%	117
Prince George	No data		No data		No data		
Prince William	217	99.54%	1	0.46%	216	99.08%	218
Princess Anne	No data		No data		No data		
Randolph	-	100.00%	-	0.00%	-	100.00%	-
Richmond	-	100.00%	-	0.00%	-	100.00%	-
Rockbridge	65	100.00%	0	0.00%	65	100.00%	65
Rockingham	-	100.00%	-	0.00%	-	100.00%	-
Russell	-	100.00%	-	0.00%	-	100.00%	-
Shenandoah	-	100.00%	-	0.00%	-	100.00%	-
Southampton	No data		No data		No data		
Spotsylvania	No data		No data		No data		
Stafford	183	97.34%	5	2.66%	178	94.68%	188
Surry	No data		No data		No data		
Sussex	118	100.00%	0	0.00%	118	100.00%	118
Warwick	56	100.00%	0	0.00%	56	100.00%	56
Washington	-	100.00%	-	0.00%	-	100.00%	-
Westmoreland	-	100.00%	-	0.00%	-	100.00%	-
Williamsburg	18	35.29%	33	64.71%	-15	-29.42%	51
Wythe	-	100.00%	-	0.00%	-	100.00%	-
York	66	73.33%	24	26.67%	42	46.66%	90
Total	3,897	67.49%	1,877	32.51%	2,020	34.98%	5,774

==== Results by county swing ====
Swing compared to the 1792 election
County	Party		Status
County	Democratic-Republican	Federalist	Status
County	± pp	± pp	Status
Accomack	No data	No data	N/A
Albemarle	0.00 pp	0.00 pp	Hold
Amelia	No data	No data	N/A
Amherst	No data	No data	N/A
Augusta	0.00 pp	0.00 pp	Hold
Bath	No data	No data	New
Bedford	0.00 pp	0.00 pp	Hold
Berkeley	▼19.78 pp	▲19.78 pp	Loss
Botetourt	No data	No data	N/A
Brooke	No data	No data	New
Brunswick	▼29.07 pp	▲29.07 pp	Loss
Buckingham	0.00 pp	0.00 pp	Hold
Campbell	0.00 pp	0.00 pp	Hold
Caroline	0.00 pp	0.00 pp	Hold
Charles City	▼78.40 pp	▲78.40 pp	Flip
Charlotte	0.00 pp	0.00 pp	Hold
Chesterfield	No data	No data	N/A
Culpeper	No data	No data	N/A
Cumberland	0.00 pp	0.00 pp	Hold
Dinwiddie	No data	No data	N/A
Elizabeth City	▼91.38 pp	▲91.38 pp	Flip
Essex	▲32.90 pp	▼32.90 pp	Gain
Fairfax	▼51.97 pp	▲51.97 pp	Flip
Fauquier	▼55.21 pp	▲55.21 pp	Flip
Fluvanna	No data	No data	N/A
Franklin	0.00 pp	0.00 pp	Hold
Frederick	▼72.87 pp	▲72.87 pp	Flip
Gloucester	No data	No data	N/A
Goochland	No data	No data	N/A
Grayson	No data	No data	New
Greenbrier	No data	No data	N/A
Greensville	No data	No data	N/A
Halifax	0.00 pp	0.00 pp	Hold
Hampshire	No data	No data	N/A
Hanover	0.00 pp	0.00 pp	Hold
Hardy	No data	No data	N/A
Harrison	No data	No data	N/A
Henrico	▼51.61 pp	▲51.61 pp	Flip
Henry	0.00 pp	0.00 pp	Hold
Isle of Wight	0.00 pp	0.00 pp	Hold
James City	▼18.09 pp	▲18.09 pp	Loss
King and Queen	No data	No data	N/A
King George	No data	No data	N/A
King William	No data	No data	N/A
Lancaster	0.00 pp	0.00 pp	Hold
Loudoun	No data	No data	N/A
Louisa	0.00 pp	0.00 pp	Hold
Lunenburg	0.00 pp	0.00 pp	Hold
Madison	No data	No data	New
Matthews	No data	No data	N/A
Mecklenburg	No data	No data	N/A
Middlesex	No data	No data	N/A
Monongalia	No data	No data	N/A
Montgomery	0.00 pp	0.00 pp	Hold
Nansemond	0.00 pp	0.00 pp	Hold
New Kent	▼57.14 pp	▲57.14 pp	Flip
Norfolk	0.00 pp	0.00 pp	Hold
Northampton	No data	No data	N/A
Northumberland	No data	No data	N/A
Nottoway	No data	No data	N/A
Ohio	No data	No data	N/A
Orange	No data	No data	N/A
Patrick	0.00 pp	0.00 pp	Hold
Pendleton	0.00 pp	0.00 pp	Hold
Pittsylvania	0.00 pp	0.00 pp	Hold
Powhatan	▼66.17 pp	▲66.17 pp	Flip
Prince Edward	0.00 pp	0.00 pp	Hold
Prince George	No data	No data	N/A
Prince William	▼0.46 pp	▲0.46 pp	Loss
Princess Anne	No data	No data	N/A
Randolph	No data	No data	N/A
Richmond	No data	No data	N/A
Rockbridge	No data	No data	N/A
Rockingham	0.00 pp	0.00 pp	Hold
Russell	0.00 pp	0.00 pp	Hold
Shenandoah	0.00 pp	0.00 pp	Hold
Southampton	No data	No data	N/A
Spotsylvania	No data	No data	N/A
Stafford	▼2.66 pp	▲2.66 pp	Loss
Surry	No data	No data	N/A
Sussex	0.00 pp	0.00 pp	Hold
Warwick	0.00 pp	0.00 pp	Hold
Washington	0.00 pp	0.00 pp	Hold
Westmoreland	0.00 pp	0.00 pp	Hold
Williamsburg	No data	No data	New
Wythe	0.00 pp	0.00 pp	Hold
York	▼26.67 pp	▲26.67 pp	Loss
Total	▼27.65 pp	▲27.65 pp	Loss

=== Results by district ===
1796 United States presidential election in Virginia
District	E.V.	Thomas Jefferson Democratic-Republican			John Adams Federalist			Margin		Total (Note: Direct results for Thomas Jefferson and John Adams are taken from all electors with either a formal ticket pledge, or a submitted electoral vote, for each district.) (Note: Some district results are missing or incomplete.)
District	E.V.	#	%	E.V.	#	%	E.V.	#	%	Total
1st	1	-	-	1	-	-	0	-	-	-
2nd	1	467	48.60%	1	494	51.40%	0	-27	-2.80%	961
3rd	1	-	100.00%	1	-	0.00%	0	-	100.00%	-
4th	1	217	90.79%	0	22	9.21%	1	195	81.58%	239
5th	1	-	100.00%	1	-	0.00%	0	-	100.00%	-
6th	1	90	100.00%	1	0	0.00%	0	90	100.00%	90
7th	1	-	100.00%	1	-	0.00%	0	-	100.00%	-
8th	1	118	100.00%	1	0	0.00%	0	118	100.00%	118
9th	1	693	57.89%	1	504	42.11%	0	189	15.78%	1,197
10th	1	28	17.95%	1	128	82.05%	0	-100	-64.10%	156
11th	1	528	100.00%	1	0	0.00%	0	528	100.00%	528
12th	1	-	100.00%	1	-	0.00%	0	-	100.00%	-
13th	1	-	100.00%	1	-	0.00%	0	-	100.00%	-
14th	1	-	100.00%	1	-	0.00%	0	-	100.00%	-
15th	1	571	74.93%	1	191	25.07%	0	380	49.86%	726
16th	1	408	64.45%	1	225	35.55%	0	183	28.90%	633
17th	1	-	100.00%	1	-	0.00%	0	-	100.00%	-
18th	1	185	100.00%	1	0	0.00%	0	185	100.00%	185
19th	1	-	100.00%	1	-	0.00%	0	-	100.00%	-
20th	1	-	100.00%	1	-	0.00%	0	-	100.00%	-
21st	1	592	65.41%	1	313	34.59%	0	279	30.82%	29
Total	21	3.897	67.49%	20	1,877	32.51%	1	2,020	34.98%	5,774

=== Results by elector ===
1796 United States presidential election in Virginia's 1st congressional district
Party	Candidate	Votes	%
Democratic-Republican	William Nimmo	—	—
Federalist	John Eyre	—	—
Total votes		—	—

1796 United States presidential election in Virginia's 2nd congressional district
Party	Candidate	Votes	%
Democratic-Republican	Nathaniel Wilkinson	467	48.60%
Federalist	John Mayo	339	35.28%
Federalist	Thomas Griffin	155	16.20%
Total votes		961	100.00%

1796 United States presidential election in Virginia's 3rd congressional district
Party	Candidate	Votes	%
Democratic-Republican	Wilson Cary Nicholas	—	100.00%
Total votes		—	100.00%

1796 United States presidential election in Virginia's 4th congressional district
Party	Candidate	Votes	%
Federalist	Benjamin Temple	17	7.11%
Democratic-Republican	James Upshaw	217	90.79%
Federalist	Ralph Wormeley	5	2.09%
Total votes		239	100.00%

1796 United States presidential election in Virginia's 5th congressional district
Party	Candidate	Votes	%
Democratic-Republican	John Taylor	—	100.00%
Total votes		—	100.00%

1796 United States presidential election in Virginia's 6th congressional district
Party	Candidate	Votes	%
Democratic-Republican	William Madison	90	100.00%
Democratic-Republican	Lewis Conner	—	—
Unknown	Buckner Thruston	—	—
Total votes		90	100.00%

1796 United States presidential election in Virginia's 7th congressional district
Party	Candidate	Votes	%
Democratic-Republican	Josiah Riddick	—	100.00%
Total votes		—	100.00%

1796 United States presidential election in Virginia's 8th congressional district
Party	Candidate	Votes	%
Democratic-Republican	John Mason	118	100.00%
Federalist	Samuel Butler	—	—
Total votes		118	100.00%

1796 United States presidential election in Virginia's 9th congressional district
Party	Candidate	Votes	%
Democratic-Republican	Robert Walker	517	43.19%
Federalist	William Munford	504	42.11%
Democratic-Republican	Alexander McRae	176	14.70%
Total votes		1,197	100.00%

1796 United States presidential election in Virginia's 10th congressional district
Party	Candidate	Votes	%
Democratic-Republican	George Markham	28	17.95%
Federalist	William Bentley	128	82.05%
Total votes		156	100.00%

1796 United States presidential election in Virginia's 11th congressional district
Party	Candidate	Votes	%
Democratic-Republican	Peter Johnson	319	59.07%
Democratic-Republican	Joseph Powell	209	38.70%
Democratic-Republican	Alexander Trent	10	1.85%
Democratic-Republican	Welles Wilson	1	0.19%
Democratic-Republican	John Woodson	1	0.19%
Total votes		540	100.00%

1796 United States presidential election in Virginia's 12th congressional district
Party	Candidate	Votes	%
Democratic-Republican	William Terry	—	100.00%
Total votes		—	100.00%

1796 United States presidential election in Virginia's 13th congressional district
Party	Candidate	Votes	%
Democratic-Republican	David Saunders	—	100.00%
Total votes		—	100.00%

1796 United States presidential election in Virginia's 14th congressional district
Party	Candidate	Votes	%
Democratic-Republican	Catesby Jones	—	100.00%
Total votes		—	100.00%

1796 United States presidential election in Virginia's 15th congressional district
Party	Candidate	Votes	%
Democratic-Republican	Daniel Carroll Brent	571	74.93%
Federalist	Charles Simms	191	25.07%
Total votes		762	100.00%

1796 United States presidential election in Virginia's 16th congressional district
Party	Candidate	Votes	%
Democratic-Republican	Moses Hunter	408	64.45%
Federalist	Richard K. Meade	225	35.55%
Total votes		633	100.00%

1796 United States presidential election in Virginia's 17th congressional district
Party	Candidate	Votes	%
Democratic-Republican	Archibald Stuart	—	100.00%
Total votes		—	100.00%

1796 United States presidential election in Virginia's 18th congressional district
Party	Candidate	Votes	%
Democratic-Republican	John Bowyer	185	100.00%
Total votes		185	100.00%

1796 United States presidential election in Virginia's 19th congressional district
Party	Candidate	Votes	%
Democratic-Republican	John Brown	—	100.00%
Total votes		—	100.00%

1796 United States presidential election in Virginia's 20th congressional district
Party	Candidate	Votes	%
Democratic-Republican	Robert Crockett	—	100.00%
Total votes		—	100.00%

1796 United States presidential election in Virginia's 21st congressional district
Party	Candidate	Votes	%
Democratic-Republican	Leven Powell	592	65.41%
Federalist	Albert Russell	313	34.59%
Total votes		905	100.00%

== See also ==
- United States presidential elections in Virginia
