= 1800 United States presidential election in Virginia =

- October 31 – December 3, 1800
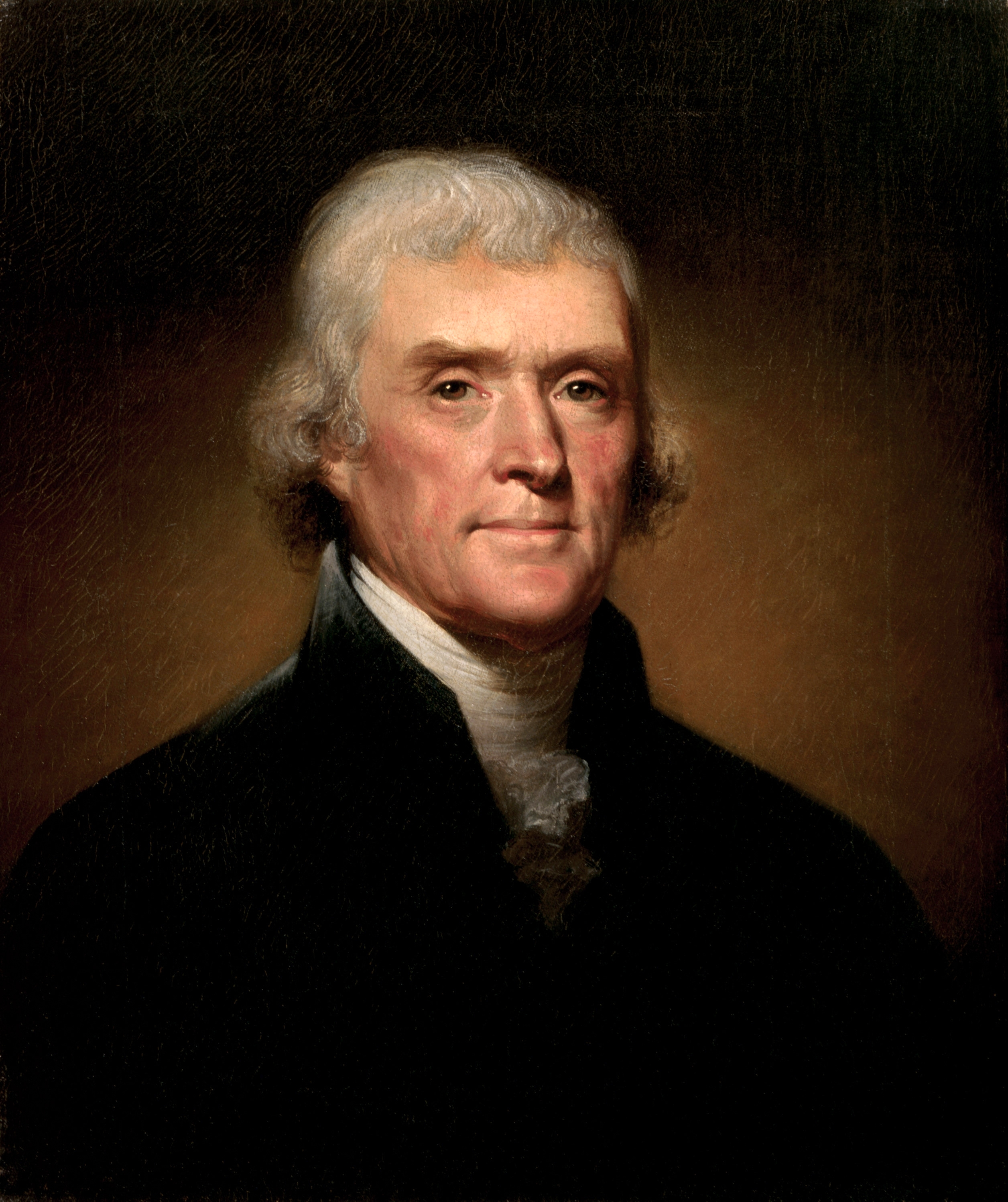

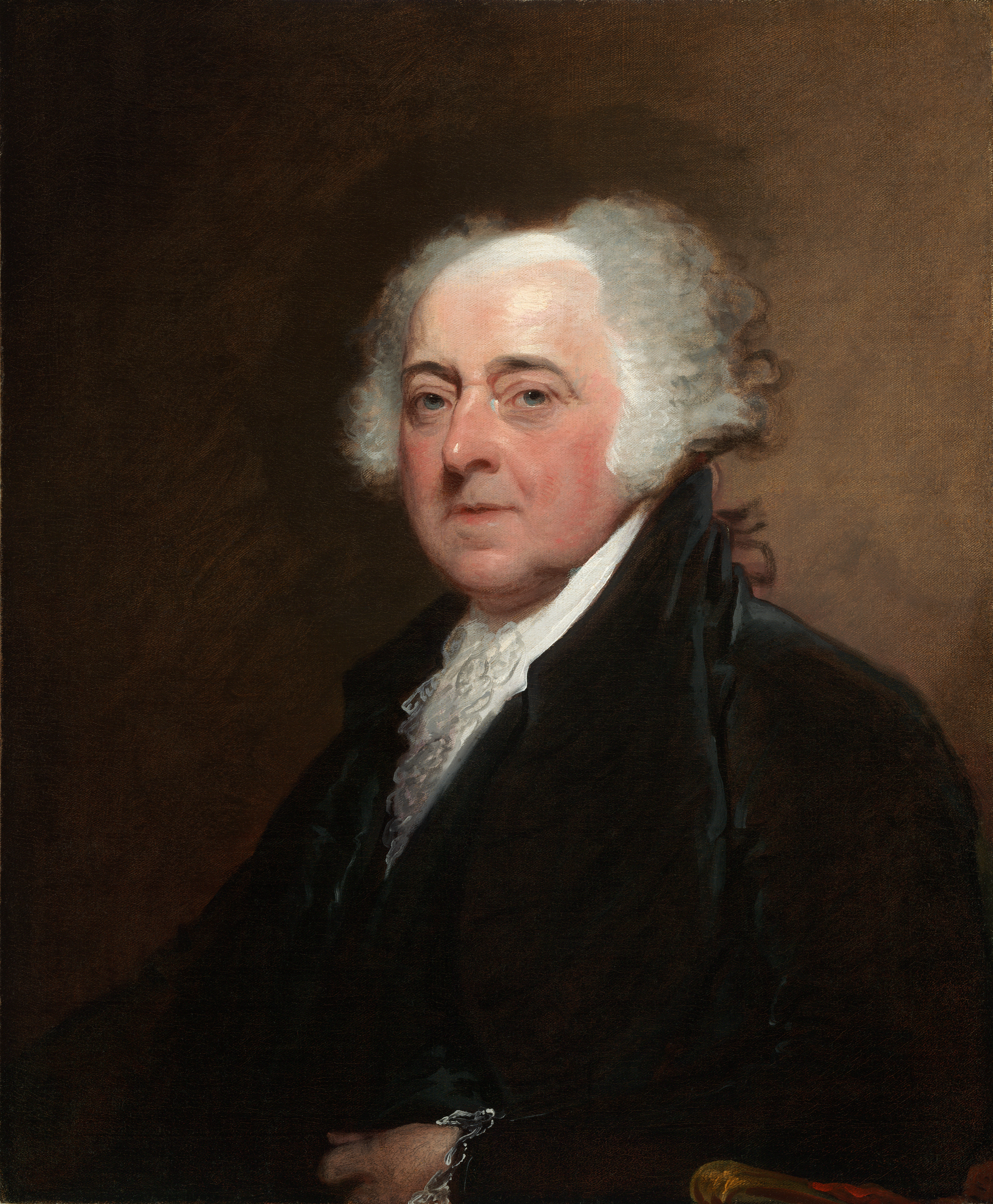
| Nominee | Thomas Jefferson | John Adams |
| Party | Democratic-Republican | Federalist |
| Home state | Virginia | Massachusetts |
| Electoral vote | 21 | 0 |
| Popular vote | 21,002 | 6,175 |
| Percentage | 77.28% | 22.72% |
County results
Jefferson
50–60%
60–70%
70–80%
80–90%
90–100%
Adams
50–60%
60–70%
70–80%
80–90%
90–100%
No data/vote
President before election
John Adams
Federalist
Elected President
Thomas Jefferson
Democratic-Republican

A presidential election was held in Virginia between October 31 and December 3, 1800. Virginia voters chose 21 representatives, or electors, to the Electoral College, who voted for president and vice president.

Democratic-Republican Vice President Thomas Jefferson carried the state by taking all 21 electoral votes and over 77.2% of the popular votes.

== Results ==
1800 United States presidential election in Virginia
| Party | Candidate | Votes | Percentage | Electoral votes |
|---|---|---|---|---|
| Democratic-Republican | Thomas Jefferson | 21,002 | 77.28% | 21 |
| Federalist | John Adams | 6,175 | 22.72% | 0 |
| Totals | | 27,177 | 100.00% | 21 |

=== Results by county ===
1800 United States presidential election in Virginia
| County | John Adams Federalist | | Thomas Jefferson Democratic-Republican | | Margin | | Total votes |
| County | # | % | # | % | # | % | Total votes |
|---|---|---|---|---|---|---|---|
| Accomack | 284 | 92.81% | 22 | 7.19% | 262 | 85.62% | 306 |
| Albemarle | 33 | 5.56% | 561 | 94.44% | -528 | -88.88% | 594 |
| Amelia | 0 | 0.00% | 243 | 100.00% | -243 | -100.00% | 243 |
| Amherst | 19 | 5.90% | 303 | 94.10% | -284 | -88.20% | 322 |
| Augusta | 462 | 66.09% | 237 | 33.91% | 225 | 32.18% | 699 |
| Bath | 55 | 32.93% | 112 | 67.07% | -57 | -34.14% | 167 |
| Bedford | 164 | 37.88% | 269 | 62.12% | -105 | -24.24% | 433 |
| Berkeley | 371 | 47.08% | 417 | 59.92% | -46 | -12.84% | 788 |
| Botetourt | 96 | 40.00% | 144 | 60.00% | -48 | -20.00% | 240 |
| Brooke | 32 | 12.70% | 220 | 87.30% | -188 | -74.60% | 252 |
| Brunswick | 25 | 6.10% | 385 | 93.90% | -360 | -87.80% | 410 |
| Buckingham | 0 | 0.00% | 501 | 100.00% | -501 | -100.00% | 501 |
| Campbell | 69 | 24.64% | 211 | 75.36% | -142 | -50.72% | 280 |
| Caroline | 6 | 1.60% | 369 | 98.40% | -363 | -96.80% | 375 |
| Charles City | 51 | 31.48% | 111 | 68.52% | -60 | -37.04% | 162 |
| Charlotte | 26 | 7.07% | 342 | 92.93% | -316 | -85.86% | 368 |
| Chesterfield | 6 | 1.29% | 460 | 98.71% | -454 | -97.42% | 466 |
| Culpeper | 100 | 21.19% | 372 | 78.81% | -272 | -57.62% | 472 |
| Cumberland | 11 | 3.67% | 289 | 96.33% | -278 | -92.66% | 300 |
| Dinwiddie | 10 | 3.05% | 318 | 96.95% | -308 | -93.90% | 328 |
| Elizabeth City | 20 | 19.61% | 82 | 80.39% | -62 | -60.78% | 102 |
| Essex | 46 | 18.04% | 209 | 81.96% | -163 | -63.92% | 255 |
| Fairfax | 218 | 47.60% | 240 | 52.40% | -22 | -4.80% | 458 |
| Fauquier | 131 | 29.84% | 308 | 70.16% | -177 | -40.32% | 439 |
| Fluvanna | 9 | 3.53% | 246 | 96.47% | -237 | -92.94% | 255 |
| Franklin | 29 | 5.18% | 531 | 94.82% | -502 | -89.64% | 560 |
| Frederick | 211 | 28.59% | 527 | 71.41% | -316 | -42.82% | 738 |
| Gloucester | 54 | 21.01% | 203 | 78.99% | -149 | -57.98% | 257 |
| Goochland | 13 | 4.18% | 298 | 95.82% | -285 | -91.64% | 311 |
| Grayson | 0 | 0.00% | 117 | 100.00% | -117 | -100.00% | 117 |
| Greenbrier | 279 | 90.88% | 28 | 9.12% | 201 | 81.76% | 307 |
| Greensville | 6 | 3.00% | 194 | 97.00% | -188 | -94.00% | 200 |
| Halifax | 15 | 1.93% | 764 | 98.07% | -749 | -96.14% | 779 |
| Hampshire | 200 | 52.63% | 180 | 47.37% | 20 | 5.26% | 380 |
| Hanover | 45 | 18.29% | 201 | 81.71% | -156 | -63.42% | 246 |
| Hardy | 140 | 60.87% | 90 | 39.13% | 50 | 21.74% | 230 |
| Harrison | 65 | 28.51% | 163 | 71.49% | -98 | -42.98% | 228 |
| Henrico | 112 | 27.32% | 298 | 72.68% | -186 | -45.36% | 410 |
| Henry | 31 | 14.42% | 184 | 85.58% | -153 | -71.16% | 215 |
| Isle of Wight | 26 | 9.29% | 254 | 90.71% | -228 | -81.42% | 280 |
| James City | 35 | 32.71% | 72 | 67.29% | -37 | -34.58% | 107 |
| Kanawha | - | 0.00% | - | 0.00% | - | 0.00% | - |
| King and Queen | 47 | 16.55% | 237 | 83.45% | -190 | -66.90% | 284 |
| King George | 48 | 34.53% | 91 | 65.47% | -43 | -30.94% | 139 |
| King William | 86 | 40.19% | 128 | 59.81% | -42 | -19.62% | 214 |
| Lancaster | 54 | 27.98% | 139 | 72.02% | -85 | -44.04% | 193 |
| Lee | 2 | 5.71% | 33 | 94.29% | -31 | -88.58% | 35 |
| Loudoun | 205 | 60.83% | 132 | 39.17% | 73 | 21.66% | 337 |
| Louisa | 27 | 5.78% | 440 | 94.22% | -413 | -88.44% | 467 |
| Lunenburg | 26 | 9.67% | 243 | 90.33% | -217 | -80.66% | 269 |
| Madison | 25 | 9.51% | 238 | 90.49% | -213 | -80.98% | 263 |
| Mathews | 29 | 14.50% | 171 | 85.50% | -142 | -71.00% | 200 |
| Mecklenburg | 109 | 27.18% | 292 | 72.82% | -183 | -45.64% | 401 |
| Middlesex | 32 | 21.33% | 118 | 78.67% | -86 | -57.34% | 150 |
| Monongalia | 185 | 42.14% | 254 | 57.86% | -69 | -15.72% | 439 |
| Monroe | 155 | 78.68% | 42 | 21.32% | 113 | 57.36% | 197 |
| Montgomery | 17 | 7.42% | 212 | 92.58% | -195 | -85.16% | 229 |
| Nansemond | 26 | 12.56% | 181 | 87.44% | -155 | -74.88% | 207 |
| New Kent | 87 | 45.31% | 105 | 54.69% | -18 | -9.38% | 192 |
| Norfolk | 148 | 29.60% | 352 | 70.40% | -204 | -40.80% | 500 |
| Northampton | 143 | 83.63% | 28 | 16.37% | 115 | 67.26% | 171 |
| Northumberland | 27 | 10.93% | 220 | 89.07% | -193 | -78.14% | 247 |
| Nottoway | 0 | 0.00% | 190 | 100.00% | -190 | -100.00% | 190 |
| Ohio | 61 | 27.11% | 164 | 72.89% | -103 | -45.78% | 225 |
| Orange | 7 | 2.03% | 337 | 97.97% | -330 | -95.94% | 344 |
| Patrick | 0 | 0.00% | 130 | 100.00% | -130 | -100.00% | 130 |
| Pendleton | 106 | 48.85% | 111 | 51.15% | -5 | -2.30% | 217 |
| Pittsylvania | 46 | 7.30% | 584 | 92.70% | -538 | -85.40% | 630 |
| Powhatan | 22 | 10.73% | 183 | 89.27% | -161 | -78.54% | 205 |
| Prince Edward | 3 | 0.86% | 344 | 99.14% | -341 | -98.28% | 347 |
| Prince George | 9 | 4.37% | 197 | 95.63% | -188 | -91.26% | 206 |
| Prince William | 42 | 20.00% | 168 | 80.00% | -126 | -40.00% | 210 |
| Princess Anne | 176 | 46.32% | 204 | 53.68% | -28 | -7.36% | 380 |
| Randolph | 21 | 40.38% | 31 | 59.62% | -10 | -19.24% | 52 |
| Richmond | 28 | 18.54% | 123 | 81.46% | -95 | -62.92% | 151 |
| Rockbridge | 164 | 42.82% | 219 | 57.18% | -55 | -14.36% | 383 |
| Rockingham | 78 | 11.78% | 584 | 88.22% | -506 | -76.44% | 662 |
| Russell | 0 | 0.00% | 31 | 100.00% | -31 | -100.00% | 31 |
| Shenandoah | 41 | 5.46% | 710 | 94.54% | -669 | -89.08% | 751 |
| Southampton | 94 | 30.52% | 214 | 69.48% | -120 | -38.96% | 308 |
| Spotsylvania | 13 | 4.48% | 277 | 95.52% | -264 | -91.04% | 290 |
| Stafford | 91 | 37.60% | 151 | 62.40% | -60 | -24.80% | 242 |
| Surry | 6 | 3.16% | 184 | 96.84% | -178 | -93.68% | 190 |
| Sussex | 5 | 1.30% | 379 | 98.70% | -374 | -97.40% | 384 |
| Tazewell | 6 | 6.82% | 82 | 93.18% | -76 | -86.36% | 88 |
| Warwick | 6 | 10.17% | 53 | 89.83% | -47 | -79.76% | 59 |
| Washington | 6 | 2.03% | 290 | 97.97% | -284 | -95.94% | 296 |
| Westmoreland | 89 | 54.94% | 73 | 45.06% | 16 | 9.88% | 162 |
| Williamsburg | 24 | 48.98% | 25 | 51.02% | -1 | -2.04% | 49 |
| Wood | 8 | 12.90% | 54 | 87.10% | -46 | -74.20% | 62 |
| Wythe | 13 | 10.32% | 113 | 89.68% | -100 | -79.36% | 126 |
| York | 24 | 24.49% | 74 | 75.51% | -50 | -51.02% | 98 |
| Total | 6,172 | 22.71% | 21,010 | 77.29% | -14,838 | -54.58% | 27,182 |

=== Results by district ===
Results by district
| District | Jefferson | | Adams | | Total |
| District | Votes | Pct. | Votes | Pct. | Total |
|---|---|---|---|---|---|
| One | 254 | 29.6% | 603 | 70.4% | 857 |
| Two | 812 | 69.2% | 362 | 30.8% | 1,174 |
| Three | 1,408 | 95.0% | 74 | 5.0% | 1,482 |
| Four | 1,066 | 78.4% | 294 | 21.6% | 1,360 |
| Five | 1,010 | 92.8% | 78 | 7.2% | 1,088 |
| Six | 1,224 | 89.4% | 145 | 10.6% | 1,369 |
| Seven | 787 | 79.7% | 200 | 20.3% | 987 |
| Eight | 1,168 | 90.7% | 120 | 9.3% | 1,288 |
| Nine | 995 | 87.4% | 144 | 12.6% | 1,139 |
| Ten | 1,076 | 97.5% | 28 | 2.5% | 1,104 |
| Eleven | 1,377 | 97.2% | 40 | 2.8% | 1,417 |
| Twelve | 1,690 | 97.7% | 40 | 2.3% | 1,730 |
| Thirteen | 1,325 | 81.9% | 293 | 18.1% | 1,618 |
| Fourteen | 646 | 72.4% | 246 | 27.6% | 892 |
| Fifteen | 559 | 61.4% | 351 | 38.6% | 910 |
| Sixteen | 944 | 61.9% | 582 | 38.1% | 1,526 |
| Seventeen | 1,531 | 72.5% | 581 | 27.5% | 2,112 |
| Eighteen | 545 | 42.1% | 749 | 57.9% | 1,294 |
| Nineteen | 1,213 | 60.0% | 810 | 40.0% | 2,023 |
| Twenty | 796 | 95.4% | 38 | 4.6% | 834 |
| Twenty-one | 576 | 62.2% | 350 | 37.8% | 926 |
| Unknown | 136 | 90.7% | 14 | 9.3% | 150 |

== See also ==
- United States presidential elections in Virginia
