= United States presidential elections in Virginia =

Presidential elections in Virginia
- Number of elections: 58
- Voted Democratic: 31
- Voted Republican: 16
- Voted Democratic-Republican: 8
- Voted other: 3 (Note: John Bell, 1860; George Washington, 1788-89, 1792.)
- Voted for winning candidate: 40
- Voted for losing candidate: 17

Following is a table of United States presidential elections in Virginia, ordered by year. Since its admission to statehood in 1788, Virginia has participated in every U.S. presidential election except the election of 1864 during the American Civil War, when the state had seceded to join the Confederacy, and the election of 1868, when the state was undergoing Reconstruction.

As of 2024, it is the only state of the former Confederacy to vote reliably Democratic, having done so in every election since 2008. It was carried by a Democratic nominee who lost the popular vote in 2024.

Winners of the state are in bold. The shading refers to the state winner, and not the national winner.

== Elections from 1864 to present ==
View source data.

Year	Winner (nationally)	Votes	Percent	Runner-up (nationally)	Votes	Percent	Other national candidates (Note: For purposes of these lists, other national candidates are defined as those who won at least one electoral vote, or won at least ten percent of the vote in multiple states.)	Votes	Percent	Electoral votes	Notes
2024	Donald Trump	2,075,085	46.05	**Kamala Harris**	2,335,395	51.83	—			13	
2020	**Joe Biden**	2,413,568	54.11	Donald Trump	1,962,430	44.00	—			13	
2016	Donald Trump (Note: Won the electoral college while losing the popular vote)	1,769,443	44.43	**Hillary Clinton**	1,981,473	49.75	—			13	
2012	**Barack Obama**	1,971,820	51.16	Mitt Romney	1,822,522	47.28	—			13	
2008	**Barack Obama**	1,959,532	52.63	John McCain	1,725,005	46.33	—			13	
2004	**George W. Bush**	1,716,959	53.68	John Kerry	1,454,742	45.48	—			13	
2000	**George W. Bush**	1,437,490	52.47	Al Gore	1,217,290	44.44	—			13	
1996	Bill Clinton	1,091,060	45.15	**Bob Dole**	1,138,350	47.1	Ross Perot	159,861	6.62	13	
1992	Bill Clinton	1,038,650	40.59	**George H. W. Bush**	1,150,517	44.97	Ross Perot	348,639	13.63	13	
1988	**George H. W. Bush**	1,309,162	59.74	Michael Dukakis	859,799	39.23	—			12	
1984	**Ronald Reagan**	1,337,078	62.29	Walter Mondale	796,250	37.09	—			12	
1980	**Ronald Reagan**	989,609	53.03	Jimmy Carter	752,174	40.31	John B. Anderson	95,418	5.11	12	
1976	Jimmy Carter	813,896	47.96	**Gerald Ford**	836,554	49.29	—			12	
1972	**Richard Nixon**	988,493	67.84	George McGovern	438,887	30.12	—			12	electoral vote split: 11 to Nixon, 1 to John Hospers (faithless elector)
1968	**Richard Nixon**	590,319	43.36	Hubert Humphrey	442,387	32.49	George Wallace	321,833	23.64	12	
1964	**Lyndon B. Johnson**	558,038	53.54	Barry Goldwater	481,334	46.18	—			12	
1960	John F. Kennedy	362,327	46.97	**Richard Nixon**	404,521	52.44	—			12	
1956	**Dwight D. Eisenhower**	386,459	55.37	Adlai Stevenson II	267,760	38.36	T. Coleman Andrews/ Unpledged Electors (Note: Was allied with a slate of unpledged electors in Louisiana, Mississippi and South Carolina)	42,964	6.16	12	
1952	**Dwight D. Eisenhower**	349,037	56.32	Adlai Stevenson II	268,677	43.36	—			12	
1948	**Harry S. Truman**	200,786	47.89	Thomas E. Dewey	172,070	41.04	Strom Thurmond	43,393	10.35	11	
1944	**Franklin D. Roosevelt**	242,276	62.36	Thomas E. Dewey	145,243	37.39	—			11	
1940	**Franklin D. Roosevelt**	235,961	68.08	Wendell Willkie	109,363	31.55	—			11	
1936	**Franklin D. Roosevelt**	234,980	70.23	Alf Landon	98,336	29.39	—			11	
1932	**Franklin D. Roosevelt**	203,979	68.46	Herbert Hoover	89,637	30.09	—			11	
1928	**Herbert Hoover**	164,609	53.91	Al Smith	140,146	45.90	—			12	
1924	Calvin Coolidge	73,312	32.79	**John W. Davis**	139,716	62.48	Robert M. La Follette	10,377	4.64	12	
1920	Warren G. Harding	87,456	37.85	**James M. Cox**	141,670	61.32	Parley P. Christensen	243	0.11	12	
1916	**Woodrow Wilson**	101,840	66.99	Charles E. Hughes	48,384	31.83	—			12	
1912	**Woodrow Wilson**	90,332	65.95	Theodore Roosevelt	21,776	15.90	William H. Taft	23,288	17.00	12	
1908	William H. Taft	52,572	38.36	**William Jennings Bryan**	82,946	60.52	—			12	
1904	Theodore Roosevelt	48,180	36.95	**Alton B. Parker**	80,649	61.84	—			12	
1900	William McKinley	115,769	43.82	**William Jennings Bryan**	146,079	55.29	—			12	
1896	William McKinley	135,379	45.94	**William Jennings Bryan**	154,708	52.50	—			12	
1892	**Grover Cleveland**	164,136	56.17	Benjamin Harrison	113,098	38.70	James B. Weaver	12,275	4.20	12	
1888	Benjamin Harrison	150,399	49.46	**Grover Cleveland**	152,004	49.99	—			12	
1884	**Grover Cleveland**	145,491	51.05	James G. Blaine	139,356	48.90	—			12	
1880	James A. Garfield	83,533	39.47	**Winfield S. Hancock**	128,083	60.53	James B. Weaver	—	—	11	
1876	Rutherford B. Hayes	95,518	40.42	**Samuel J. Tilden**	140,770	59.58	—			11	
1872	**Ulysses S. Grant**	93,463	50.47	Horace Greeley	91,647	49.49	—			11	
1868	Ulysses S. Grant			Horatio Seymour			—				No vote due to status of Reconstruction.
1864	Abraham Lincoln			George B. McClellan			—				No vote due to secession.

== Election of 1860 ==
The election of 1860 was a complex realigning election in which the breakdown of the previous two-party alignment culminated in four parties each competing for influence in different parts of the country. The victory by an ardent opponent of slavery spurred the secession of eleven states, including Virginia, and brought about the American Civil War.

Year	Winner (nationally)	Votes	Percent	Runner-up (nationally)	Votes	Percent	Runner-up (nationally)	Votes	Percent	Runner-up (nationally)	Votes	Percent	Electoral votes
1860	Abraham Lincoln	1,887	1.1	Stephen A. Douglas	16,198	9.7	John C. Breckinridge	74,325	44.5	**John Bell**	74,481	44.6	15

== Elections from 1828 to 1856 ==
Year	Winner (nationally)	Votes	Percent	Runner-up (nationally)	Votes	Percent	Other national candidates	Votes	Percent	Electoral votes	Notes
1856	**James Buchanan**	90,083	59.96	John C. Frémont	no ballots		Millard Fillmore	60,150	40.04	15	
1852	**Franklin Pierce**	73,872	55.71	Winfield Scott	58,732	44.29	John P. Hale	no ballots		15	
1848	Zachary Taylor	45,265	49.20	**Lewis Cass**	46,739	50.80	Martin Van Buren	no ballots		17	
1844	**James K. Polk**	50,679	53.05	Henry Clay	44,860	46.95	—			17	
1840	William Henry Harrison	42,637	49.35	**Martin Van Buren**	43,757	50.65	—			23	
1836	**Martin Van Buren**	30,556	56.64	Hugh Lawson White	23,384	43.35	various (Note: Three other candidates ran and received electoral votes nationally as part of the unsuccessful Whig strategy to defeat Martin Van Buren by running four candidates with local appeal in different regions of the country. The others were William Henry Harrison, Daniel Webster, and Willie Person Mangum. None of these candidates appeared on the ballot in Virginia.)			23	
1832	**Andrew Jackson**	34,243	74.96	Henry Clay	11,436	25.03	William Wirt	3	0.01	23	
1828	**Andrew Jackson**	26,854	68.99	John Quincy Adams	12,070	31.01	—			24	

== Election of 1824 ==
The election of 1824 was a complex realigning election following the collapse of the prevailing Democratic-Republican Party, resulting in four different candidates each claiming to carry the banner of the party, and competing for influence in different parts of the country. The election was the only one in history to be decided by the House of Representatives under the provisions of the Twelfth Amendment to the United States Constitution after no candidate secured a majority of the electoral vote. It was also the first presidential election in which the candidate who received a plurality of electoral votes (Andrew Jackson) did not become president, a source of great bitterness for Jackson and his supporters, who proclaimed the election of Adams a corrupt bargain.

Year	Winner (nationally)	Votes	Percent	Runner-up (nationally)	Votes	Percent	Runner-up (nationally)	Votes	Percent	Runner-up (nationally)	Votes	Percent	Electoral votes
1824	Andrew Jackson	2,975	19.35	John Quincy Adams	3,419	22.24	Henry Clay	419	2.73	**William H. Crawford**	8,558	55.68	24

== Elections from 1788-89 to 1820 ==
In the election of 1820, incumbent President James Monroe ran effectively unopposed, winning all 25 of Virginia's electoral votes, and all electoral votes nationwide except one vote in New Hampshire. To the extent that a popular vote was held, it was primarily directed to filling the office of vice president. In the 1788-89 election, Kentucky was a part of Virginia.

Year	Winner (nationally)	Runner-up (nationally)	Electoral votes	Notes
1820	**James Monroe**	—	25	Monroe effectively ran unopposed.
1816	**James Monroe**	Rufus King	25	
1812	**James Madison**	DeWitt Clinton	25	
1808	**James Madison**	Charles C. Pinckney	24	
1804	**Thomas Jefferson**	Charles C. Pinckney	24	
1800	**Thomas Jefferson**	John Adams	21	
1796	John Adams	**Thomas Jefferson**	21	Electoral vote split, twenty for Jefferson, one for Adams.
1792	**George Washington**	—	21	Washington effectively ran unopposed.
1788-89	**George Washington**	—	10	Washington effectively ran unopposed.

== See also ==
- Elections in Virginia
