= Mann Page (planter, born 1766) =

Mann Page (1766 – 24 August 1813) was an American planter.

Mann was the first born son of John Page and Frances Burwell (1745–1784). He was born in Gloucester County, Virginia, Mann Page was a member of the wealthy Page family, one of the First Families of Virginia. His father, John served as Governor of Virginia from 1802 to 1805. His uncle Mann Page III was a delegate to the Continental Congress in 1777. He was elected as a member to the American Philosophical Society in 1785.

In 1788, Page married Elizabeth Nelson, daughter of Declaration of Independence signer Thomas Nelson Jr and Lucy Grymes. Together they had fifteen children: John (1789–1817), Lucy (b. 1790), Frances (b. 1791), Thomas Nelson (b. 1792), Mann (b. 1794), Eliza (b. 1795), William Nelson (1797–1829), Mary Jane (b. 1798), Warner Lewis (1800-1822), Sally (1802–1869), Ann (b. 1803), Philip (1804–1821), Robert Nelson (1805–1824), Thomas Jefferson (b. 1807), Cornelia (1809–1890). Other than maintaining the family plantation at Rosewell, he worked for some time as a clerk for the Gloucester County Court and in 1793 built the Shelly residence on the North bank of the York River.

He died in Mount Airy, Hanover County, Virginia.
