= List of primary state highways in Virginia shorter than one mile =

The following is a list of primary state highways in Virginia shorter than one mile (1.6 km) in length. For a list of such highways serving Virginia state institutions, see State highways serving Virginia state institutions.

== SR 34 ==
State Route 34
- Location: South Boston
- Length: 0.54 mi (870 m)

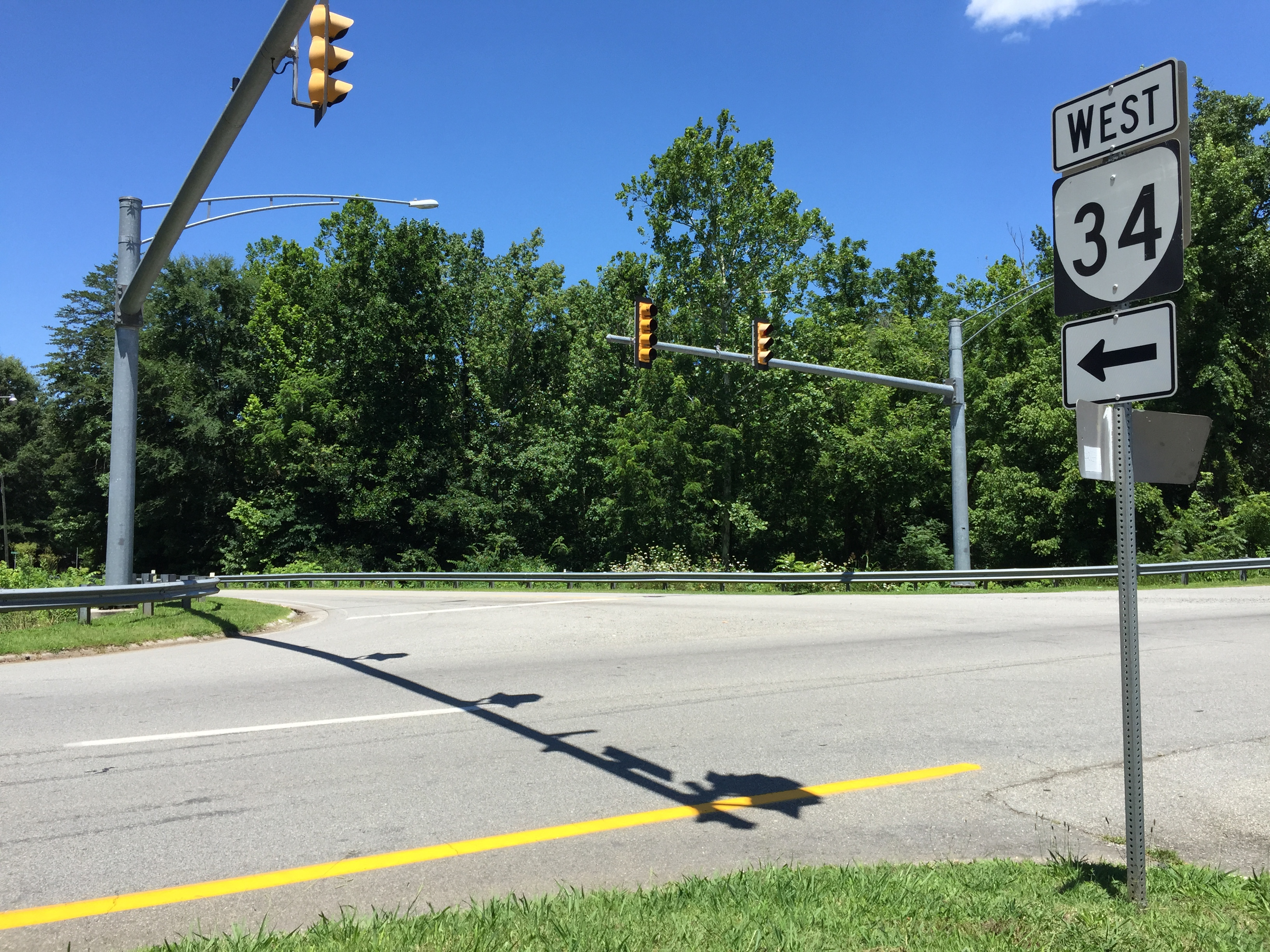
View west at the east end of SR 34 at US 360 in South Boston

State Route 34 is the designation for Hodges Street, which runs 0.54 miles (870 m) from SR 129 east to US 360 within the town of South Boston.

== SR 73 ==
State Route 73
- Location: Henrico
- Length: 0.78 mi (1,260 m)

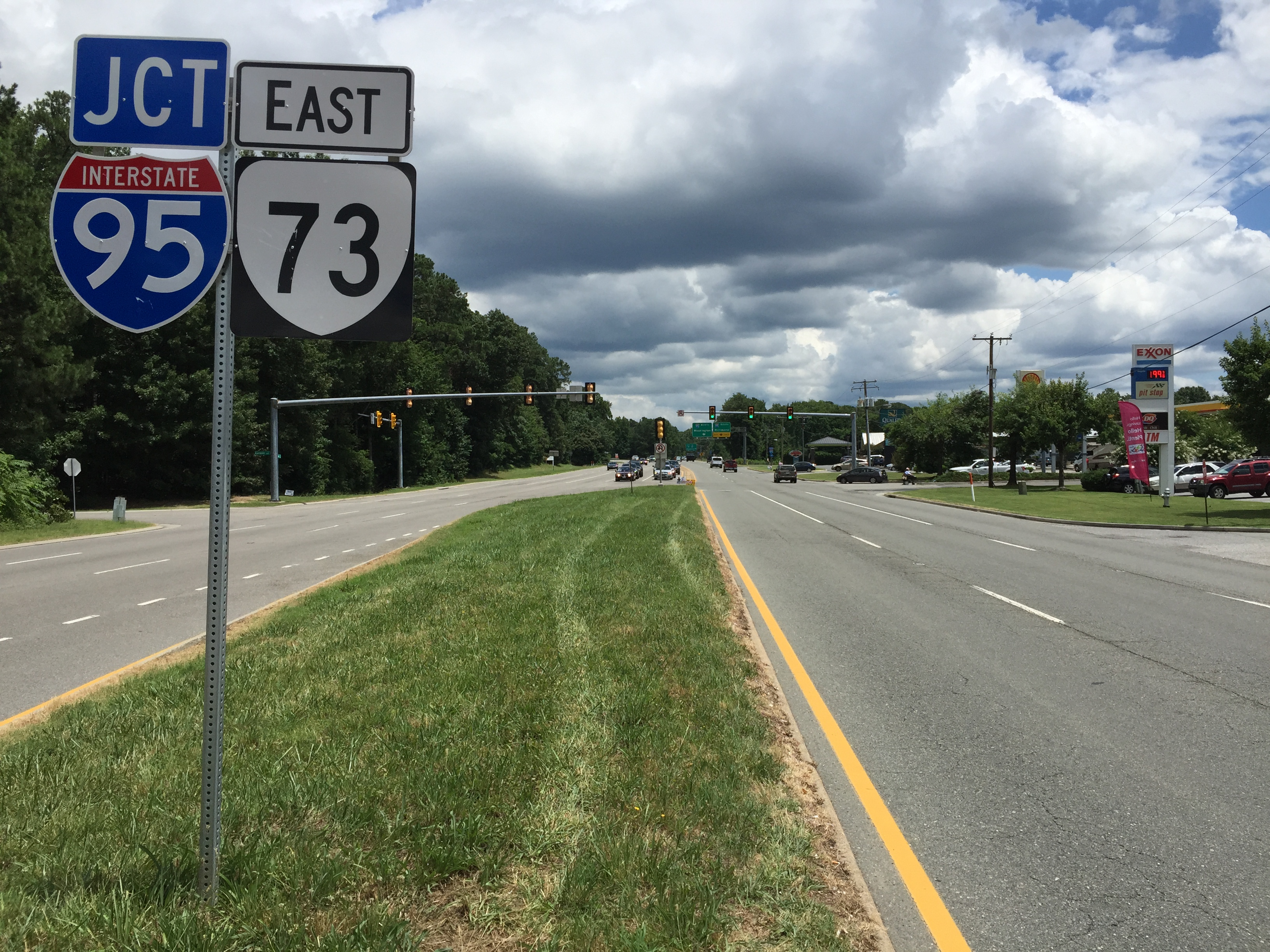
View east along SR 73 near Chamberlayne

State Route 73 is the designation for the portion of Parham Road between US 1 and I-95 near the Chamberlayne area of Henrico. Parham Road is a four-lane divided highway that passes along the west and north side of Richmond from SR 150 near the James River to US 301 just south of I-295. SR 73 was planned and built as a simple trumpet connection between I-95 and US 1; the number was assigned in 1958. The road was completed in 1962; the extension of Parham Road east from I-95 opened in 1978.

== SR 79 ==
State Route 79
- Location: Linden
- Length: 0.23 mi (370 m)

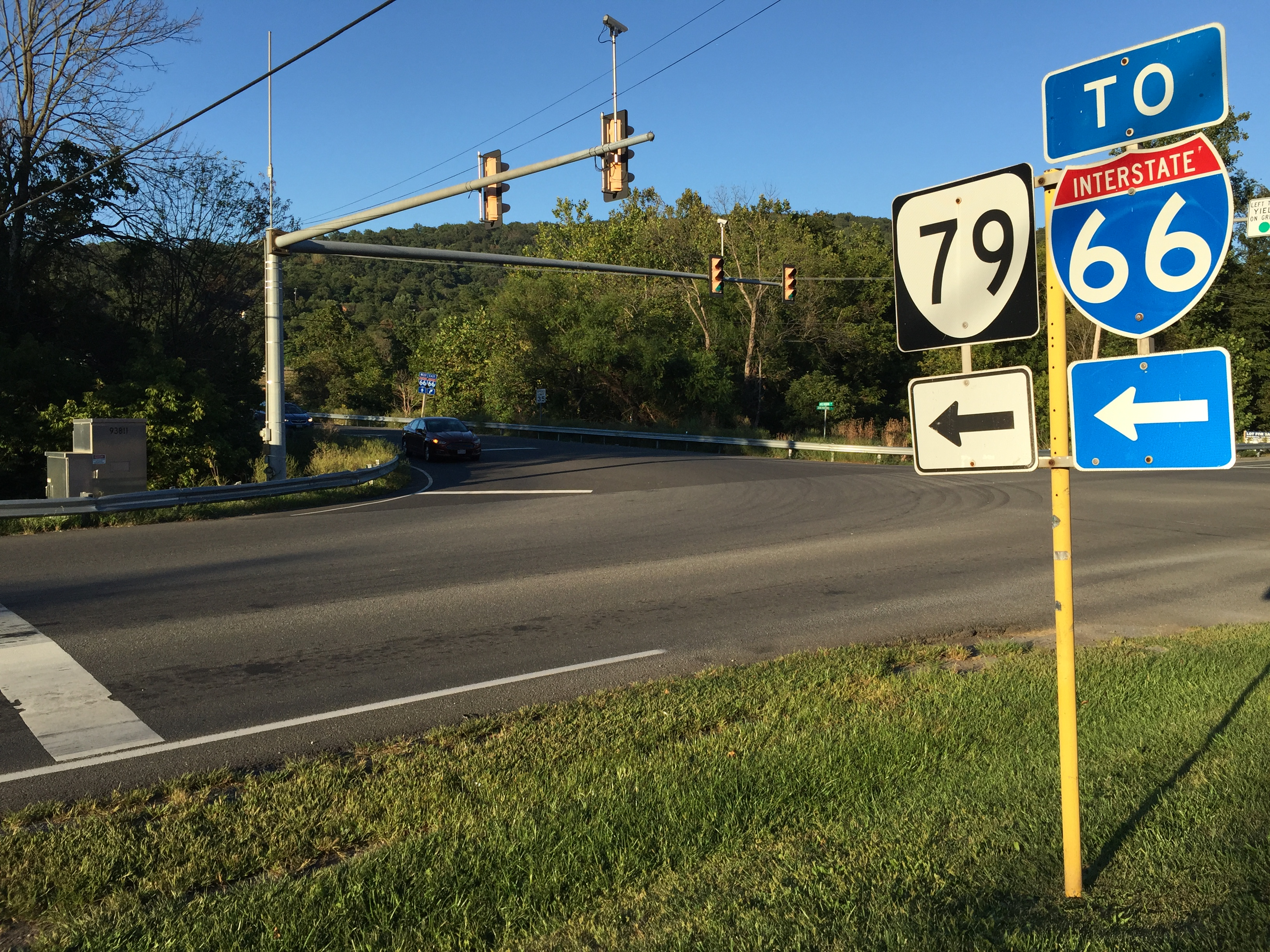
Sign for SR 79 along SR 55 in Linden

State Route 79 is the designation for Apple Mountain Road, a 0.23-mile (370 m) connector between SR 55 and a diamond interchange with I-66 in Linden.

== SR 93 ==
State Route 93
- Location: Mouth of Wilson
- Length: 0.92 mi (1,480 m)

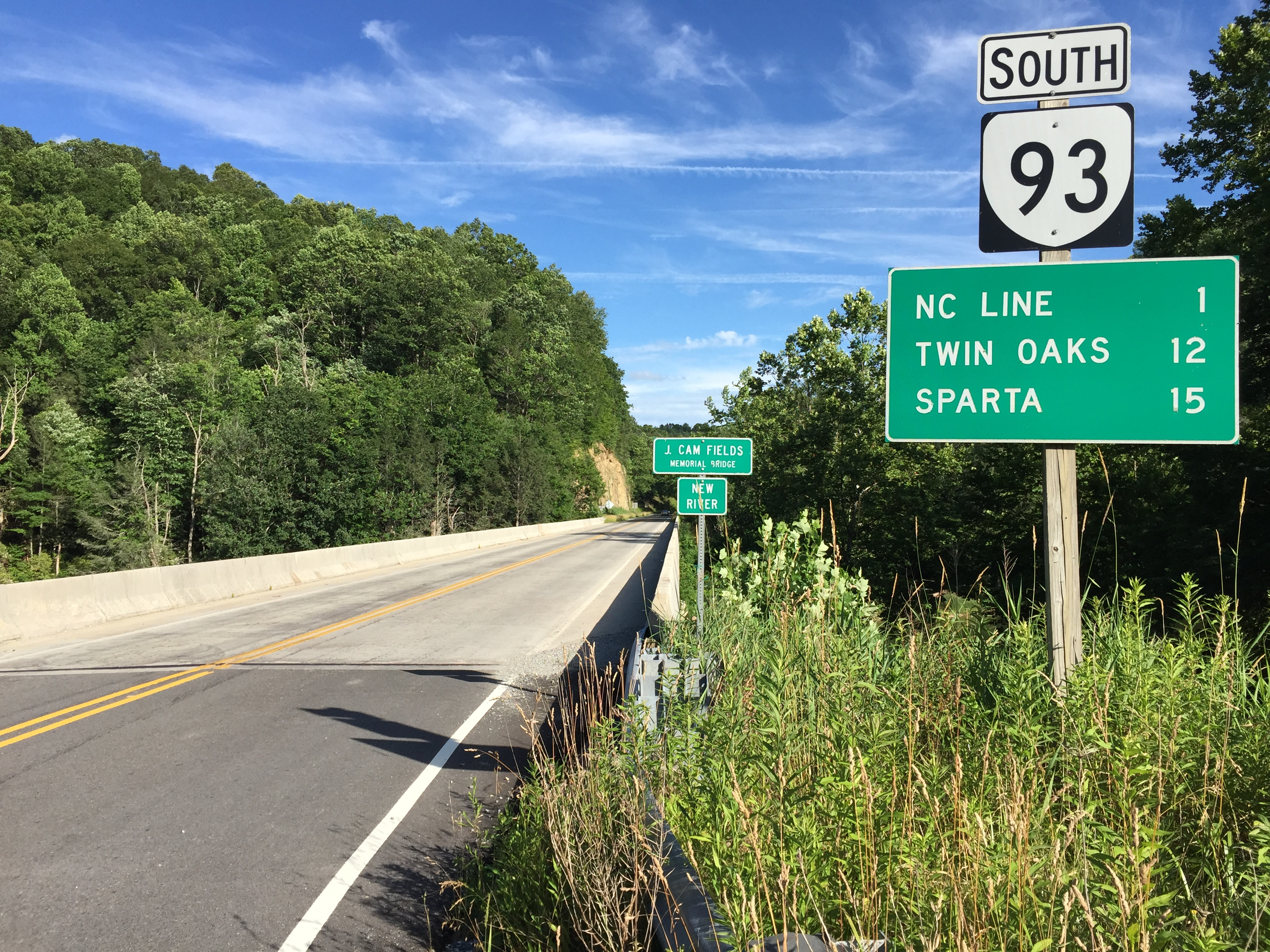
View south at the north end of SR 93 at US 58 in Mouth of Wilson

State Route 93 is the designation for the 0.92-mile (1,480 m) portion of Wilson Highway between US 58 near Mouth of Wilson and the North Carolina state line. The state highway crosses the New River just south of US 58 and continues south as North Carolina Highway 93.

== SR 98 ==
State Route 98
- Location: Bland
- Length: 0.50 mi (800 m)

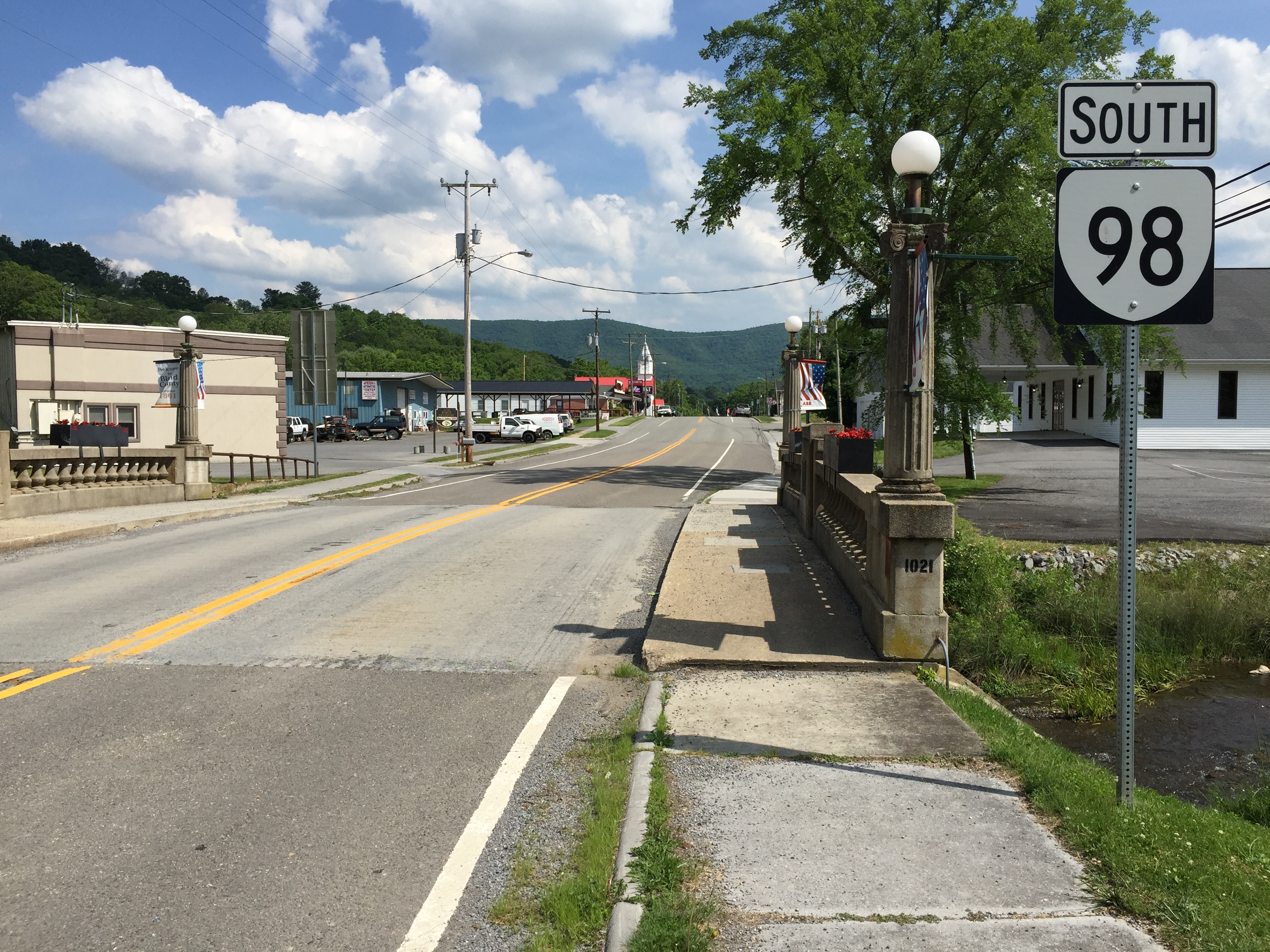
View south at the north end of SR 98 at US 52/SR 42 in Bland

State Route 98 is the designation for the 0.50-mile (800 m) portion of Main Street south of US 52 and SR 42 in Bland. Main Street continues south as SR 605.

== SR 109 ==
State Route 109
- Location: Petersburg
- Length: 0.91 mi (1,460 m)

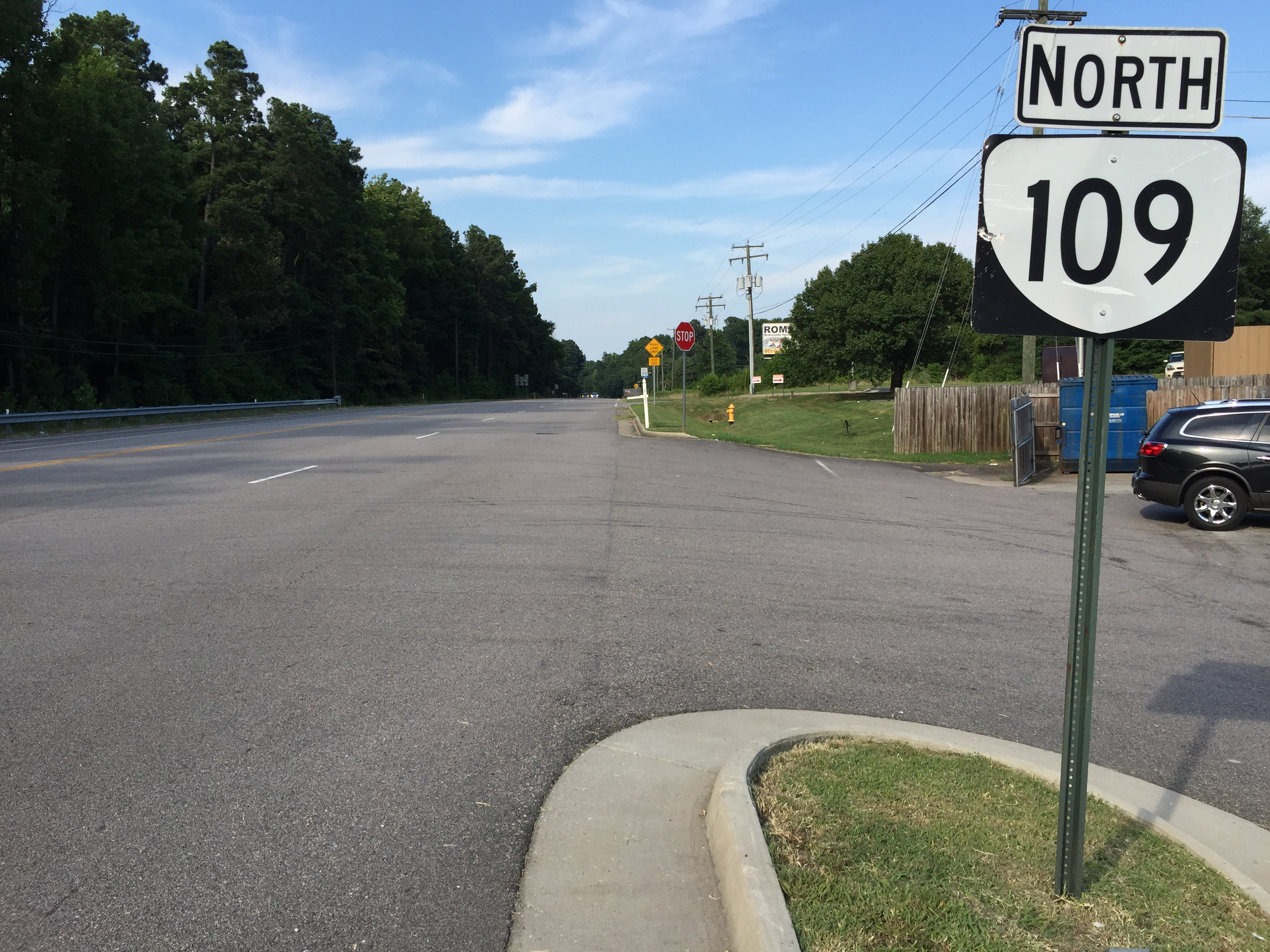
View north at the south end of SR 109 at US 460 in Petersburg

State Route 109 is the designation for Hickory Hill Road, which runs 0.91 miles (1,460 m) from US 460 east to an extrance to Fort Lee within the city of Petersburg.

== SR 112 ==
State Route 112
- Location: Salem
- Length: 0.65 mi (1,050 m)

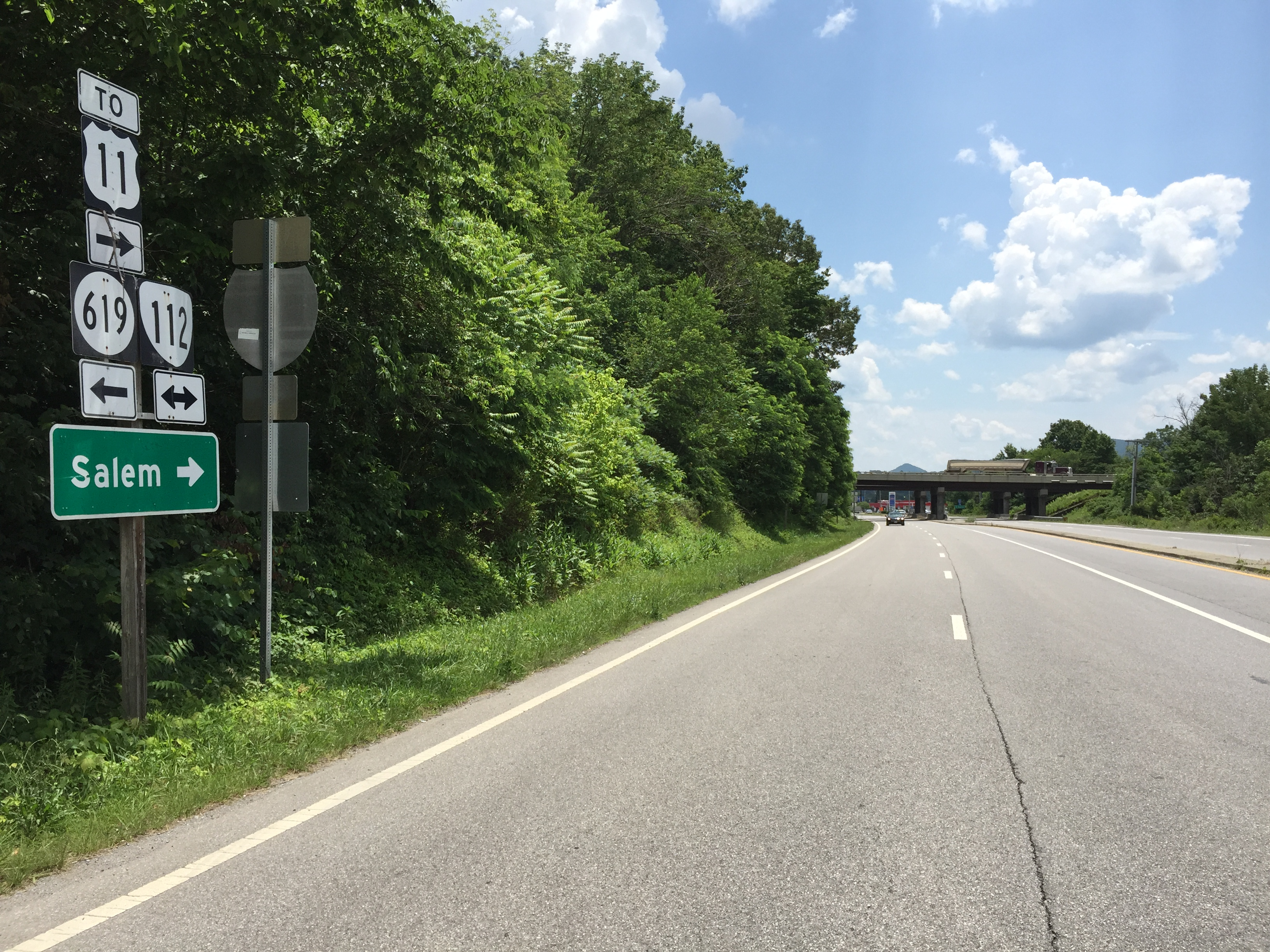
View south at the north end of SR 112 at I-81 in Salem

State Route 112 is the designation for the 0.65-mile (1,050 m) section of Wildwood Road from US 11 and US 460 in the city of Salem north to Skyview Road just north of the four-lane divided highway's interchange with I-81 north of the city limits in Roanoke County.

== SR 124 ==
State Route 124
- Location: Arlington
- Length: 0.87 mi (1,400 m)

State Route 124 is the designation for the 0.17-mile (900 ft; 270 m) state-maintained segment of Spout Run Parkway between US 29 and Lorcom Lane in Arlington. The highway continues south as Kirkwood Road to the Virginia Square neighborhood of Arlington. Spout Run Parkway continues east as a National Park Service highway parallel to the eponymous tributary of the Potomac River to a partial interchange with the George Washington Memorial Parkway.

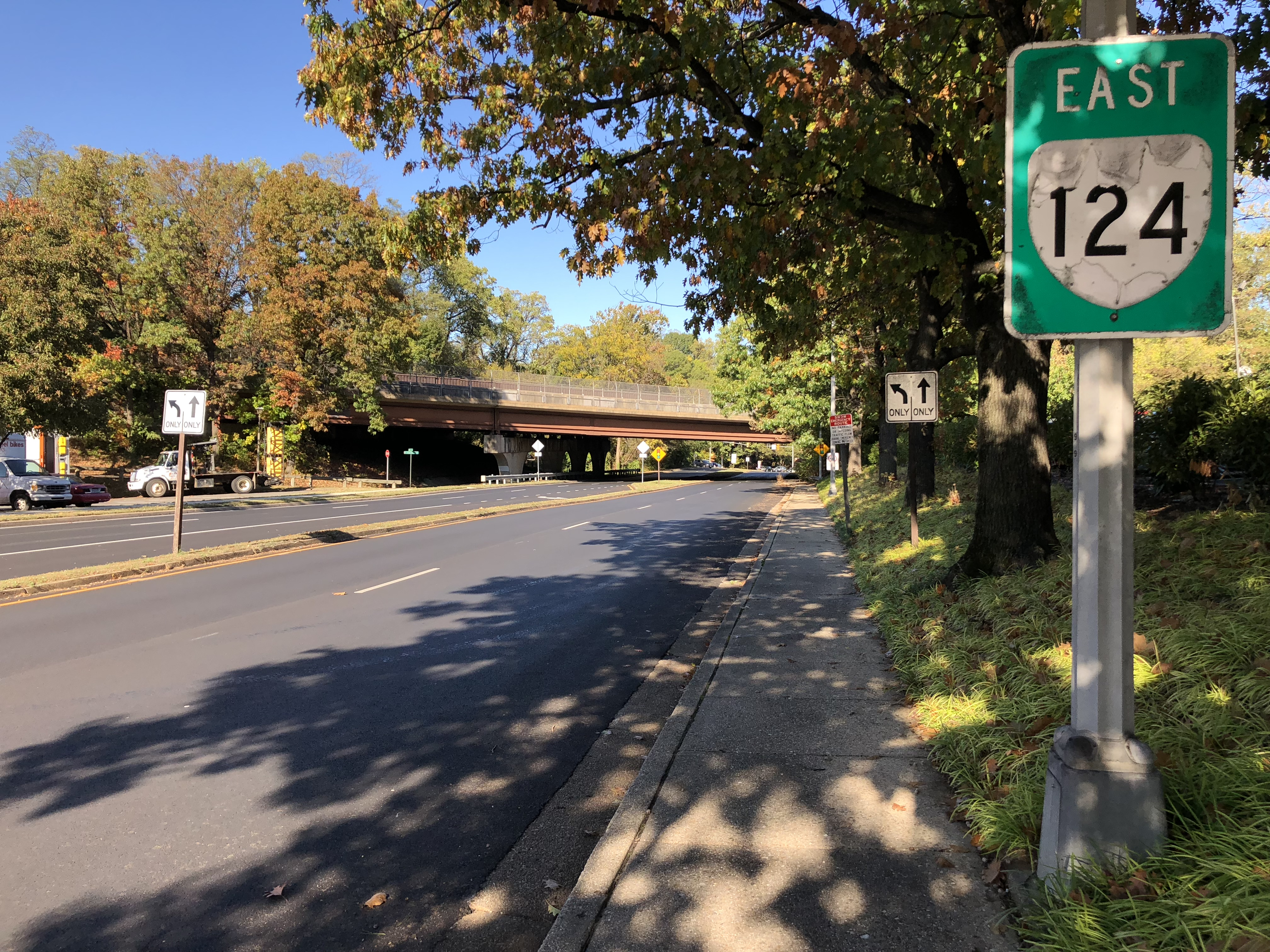
SR 124 just east of US 29 in Woodmont

Major intersections
The entire route is in Arlington County.

Location	mi	km	Destinations	Notes
Woodmont	0.00	0.00	US 29 (Lee Highway) to I-66 – Falls Church, Fairfax, Washington	Western terminus
Maywood	0.17	0.27	Lorcom Lane	Transition from state to NPS maintenance
Rosslyn	0.87	1.40	George Washington Parkway south – Key Bridge, Washington	Interchange; eastern terminus
1.000 mi = 1.609 km; 1.000 km = 0.621 mi

== SR 132Y ==
State Route 132Y
- Length: 0.29 mi (470 m)

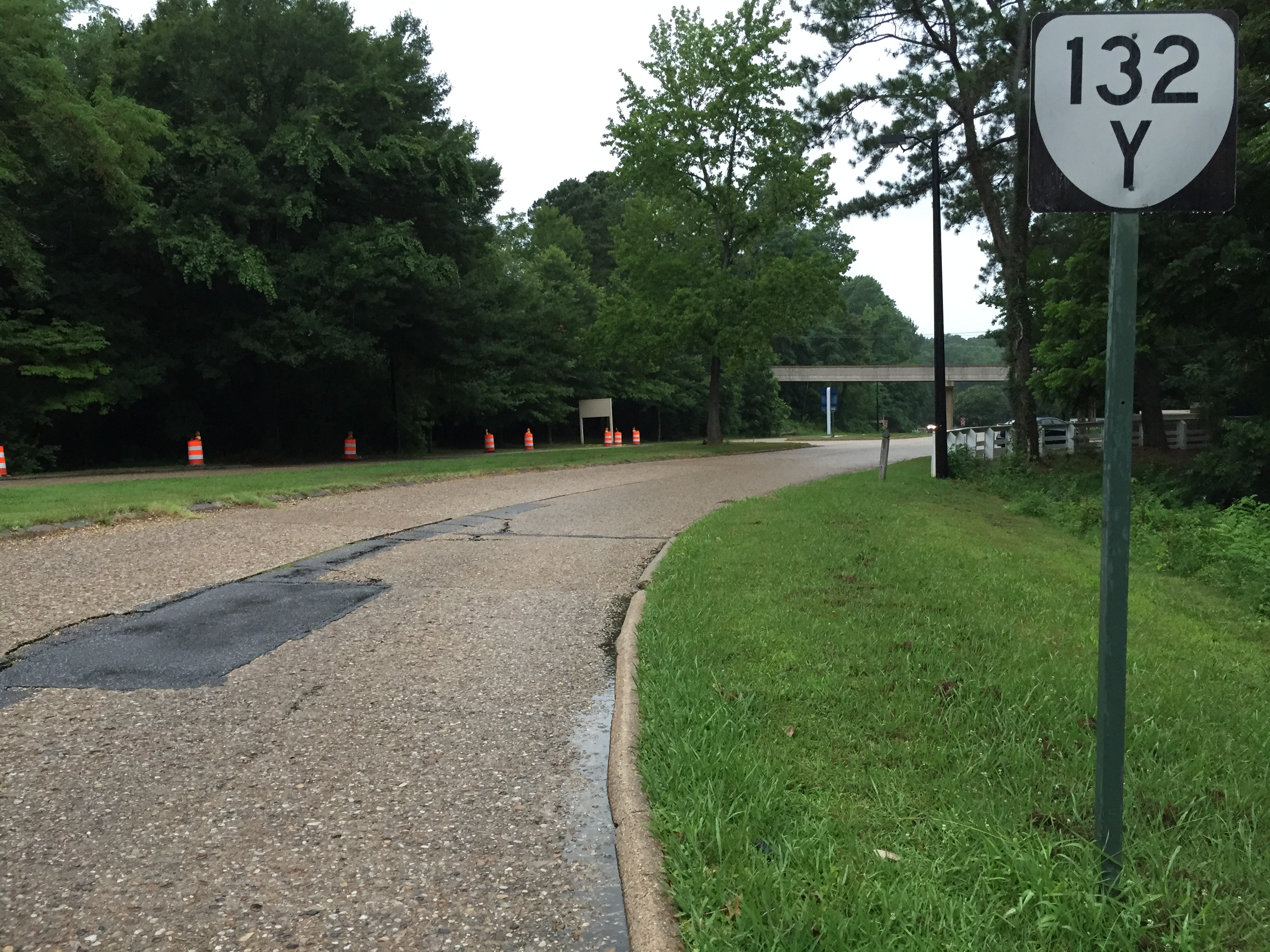
View north along SR 132Y at Colonial Parkway in Williamsburg

State Route 132Y is a 0.29-mile (470 m) spur in Williamsburg. It begins at a directional intersection with SR 132 just west of the Colonial Williamsburg Visitors Center. From there it continues to its end at another directional intersection with the Colonial Parkway.

== SR 140 ==
State Route 140
- Location: Abingdon
- Length: 0.38 mi (610 m)
- Existed: 1960–present

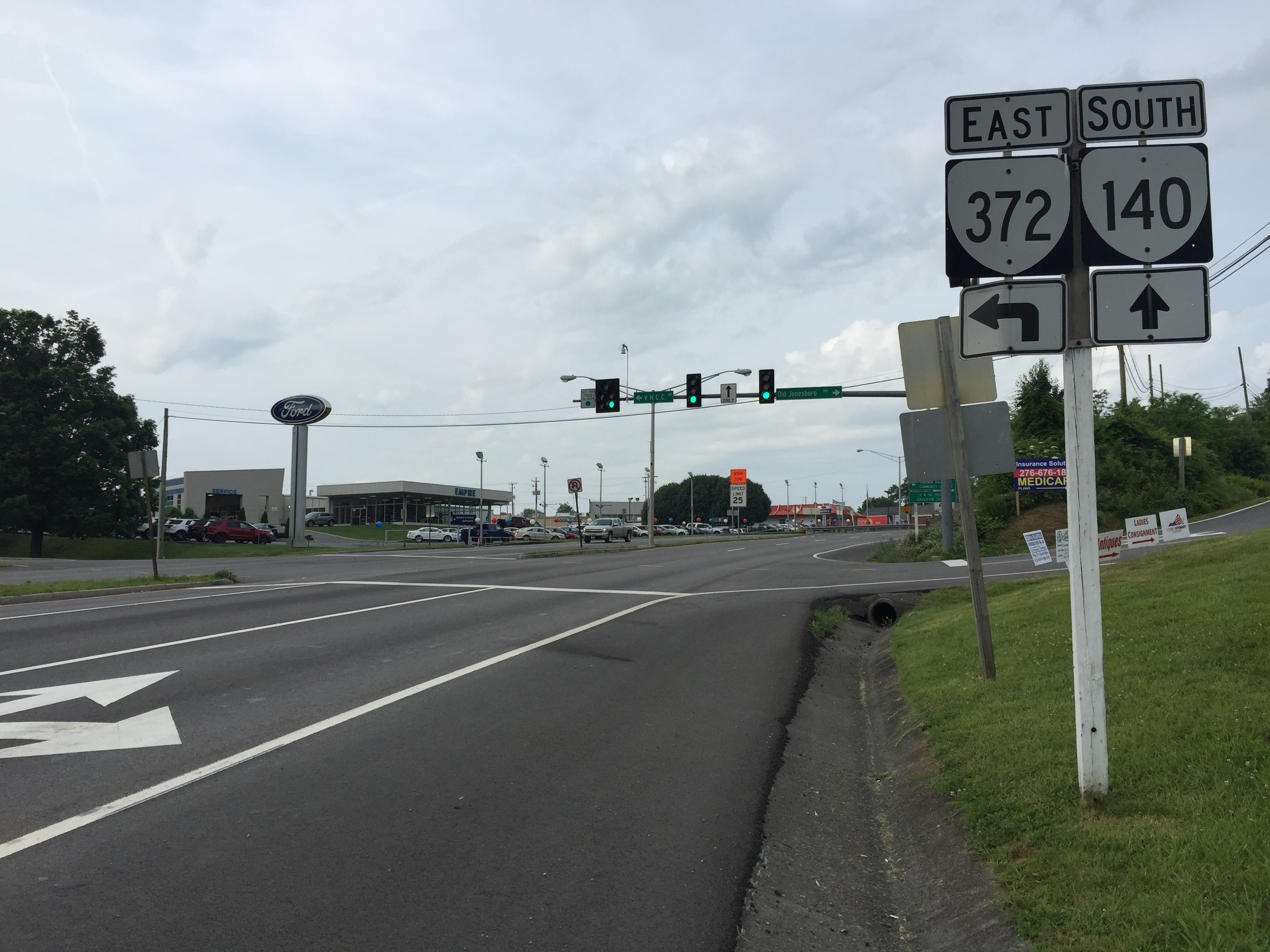
View south along SR 140 at SR 372 in Abingdon

State Route 140 is the designation for the 0.38-mile (610 m) state-maintained segment of Jonesboro Road from I-81 north to US 11/US 19 in Abingdon. SR 140 was added to the state highway system in 1960 as a connection between the Interstate and the U.S. Highways.

== SR 146 ==
State Route 146
- Location: Richmond
- Length: 0.86 mi (1,380 m)

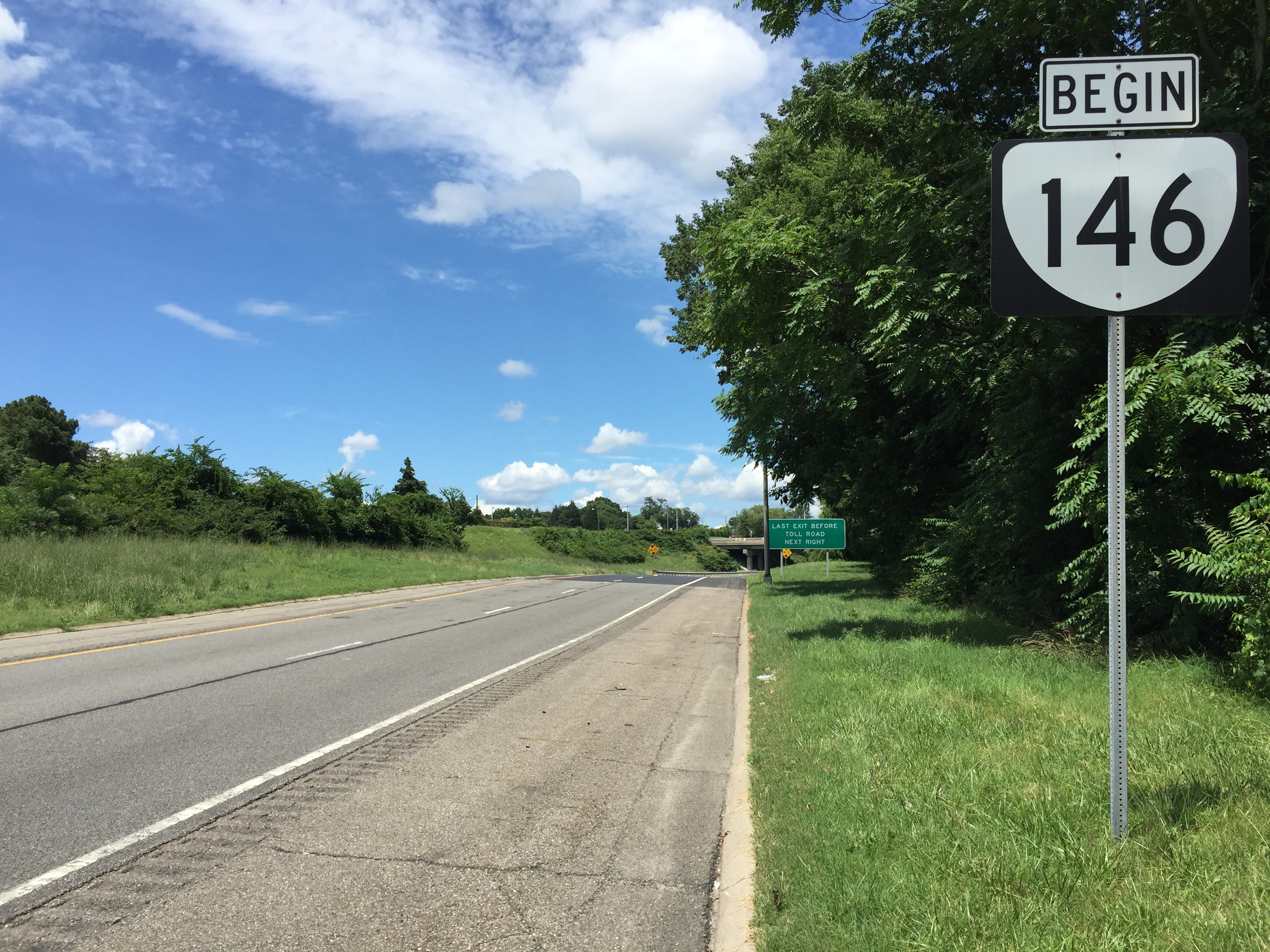
The west end of SR 146 at SR 76 in Richmond

State Route 146 is the designation for the 0.86-mile (1,380 m) freeway connection between SR 76 (Powhite Parkway) in the direction of Chesterfield County and SR 195 (Downtown Expressway) toward Downtown Richmond in the city of Richmond. The freeway forms the southeast side of the wye between SR 76, SR 195, and I-195 west of downtown Richmond. SR 146 has an interchange with Maplewood Avenue next to City Stadium.

== SR 148 ==
State Route 148
- Location: Fancy Gap
- Length: 0.87 mi (1,400 m)

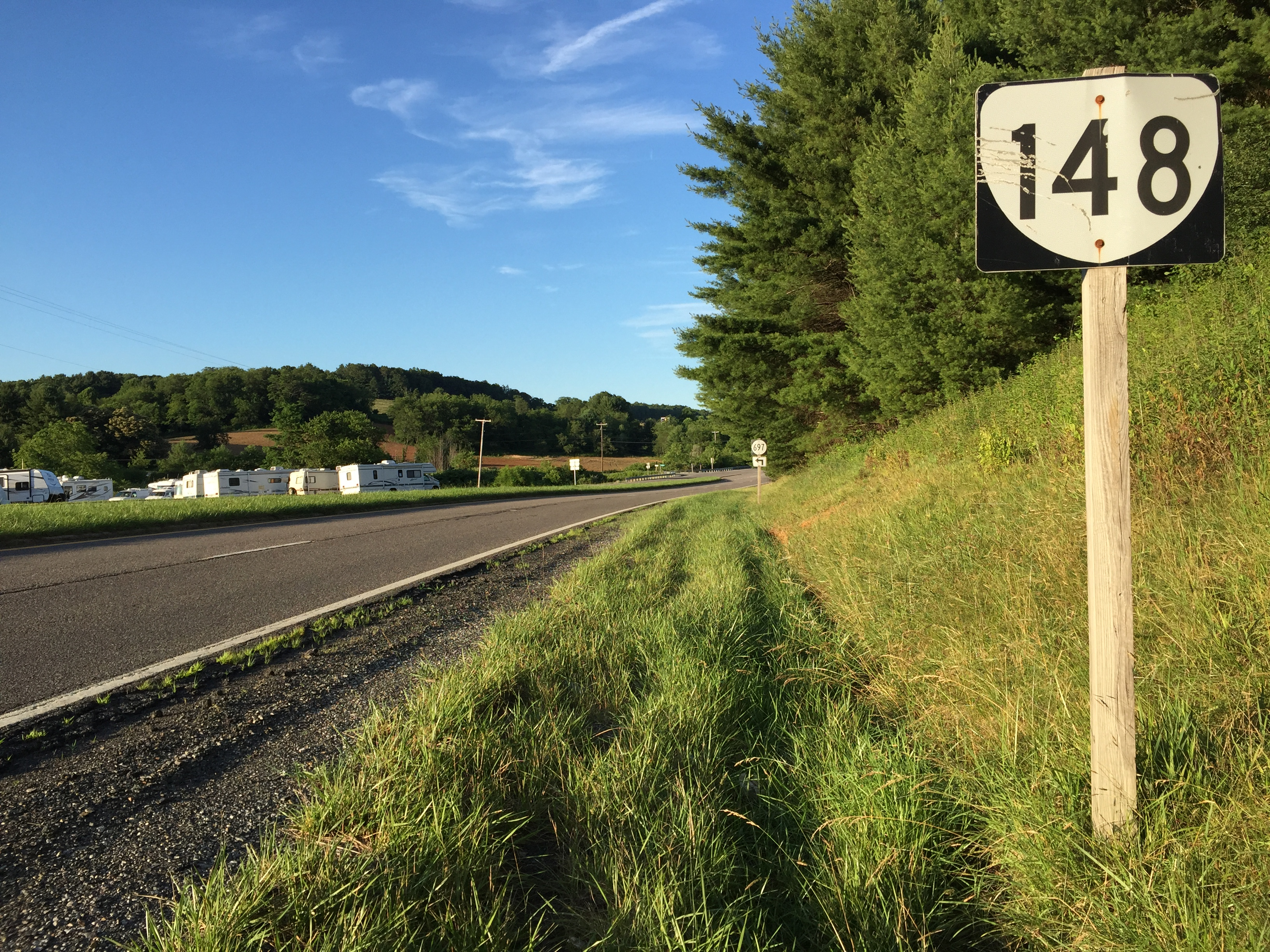
SR 148 east of I-77 in Fancy Gap

State Route 148 is the designation for the 0.87-mile (1,400 m) section of Chances Creek Road from I-77 east to US 52 near Fancy Gap. Via US 52, SR 148 connects I-77 with the Blue Ridge Parkway. The parkway has an interchange with US 52 in the hamlet of Fancy Gap, also the name of the mountain pass where US 52 summits the Blue Ridge Mountains.

== SR 162 ==
State Route 162
- Location: Williamsburg
- Length: 0.17 mi (270 m)

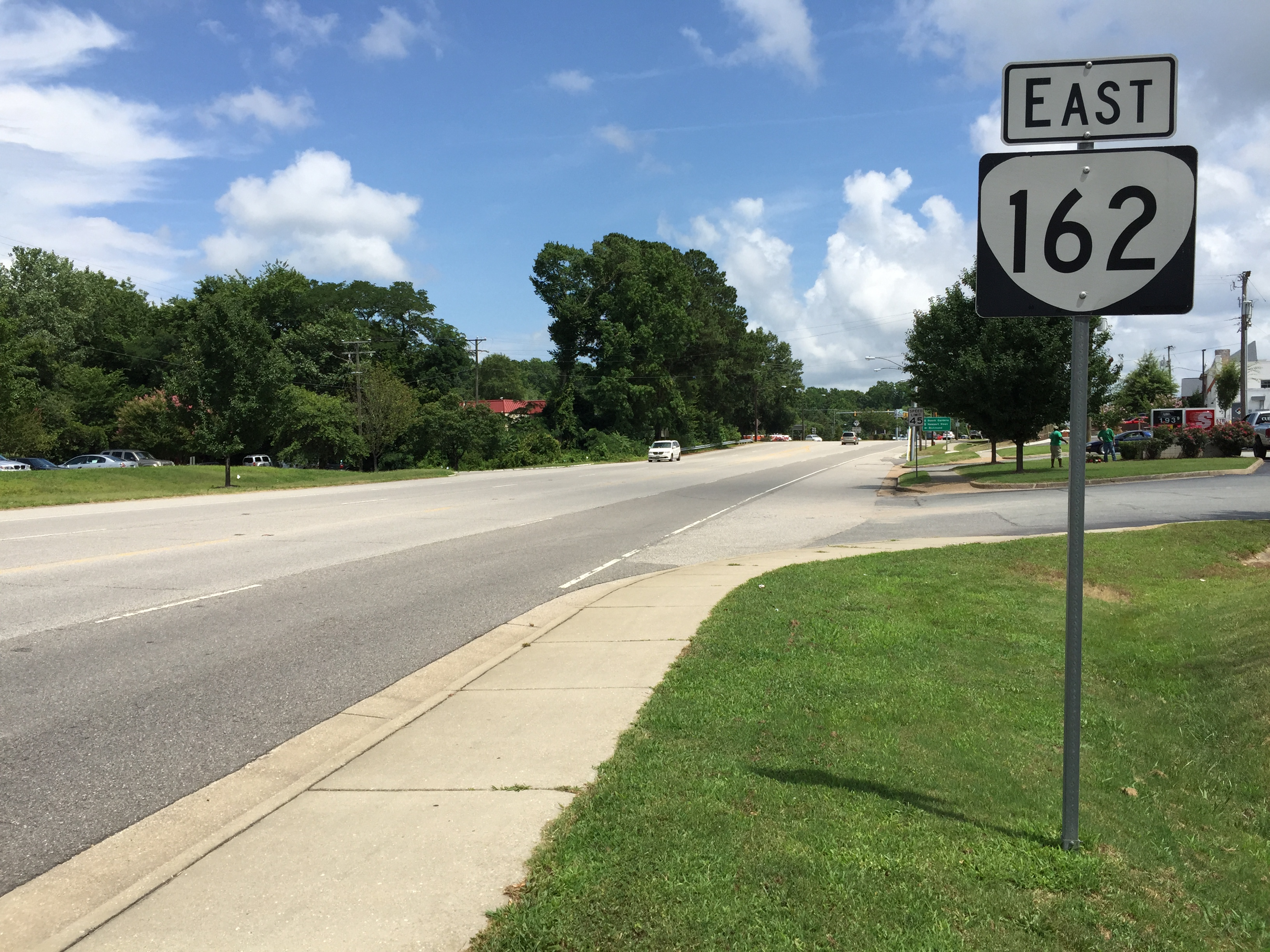
View east along SR 162 between Parkway Drive and SR 143 near Williamsburg

State Route 162 is the designation for the 0.17-mile (900 ft; 270 m) section of Second Street between the east city limit of Williamsburg and SR 143 in York County.

== SR 167 ==
State Route 167
- Location: Troutville

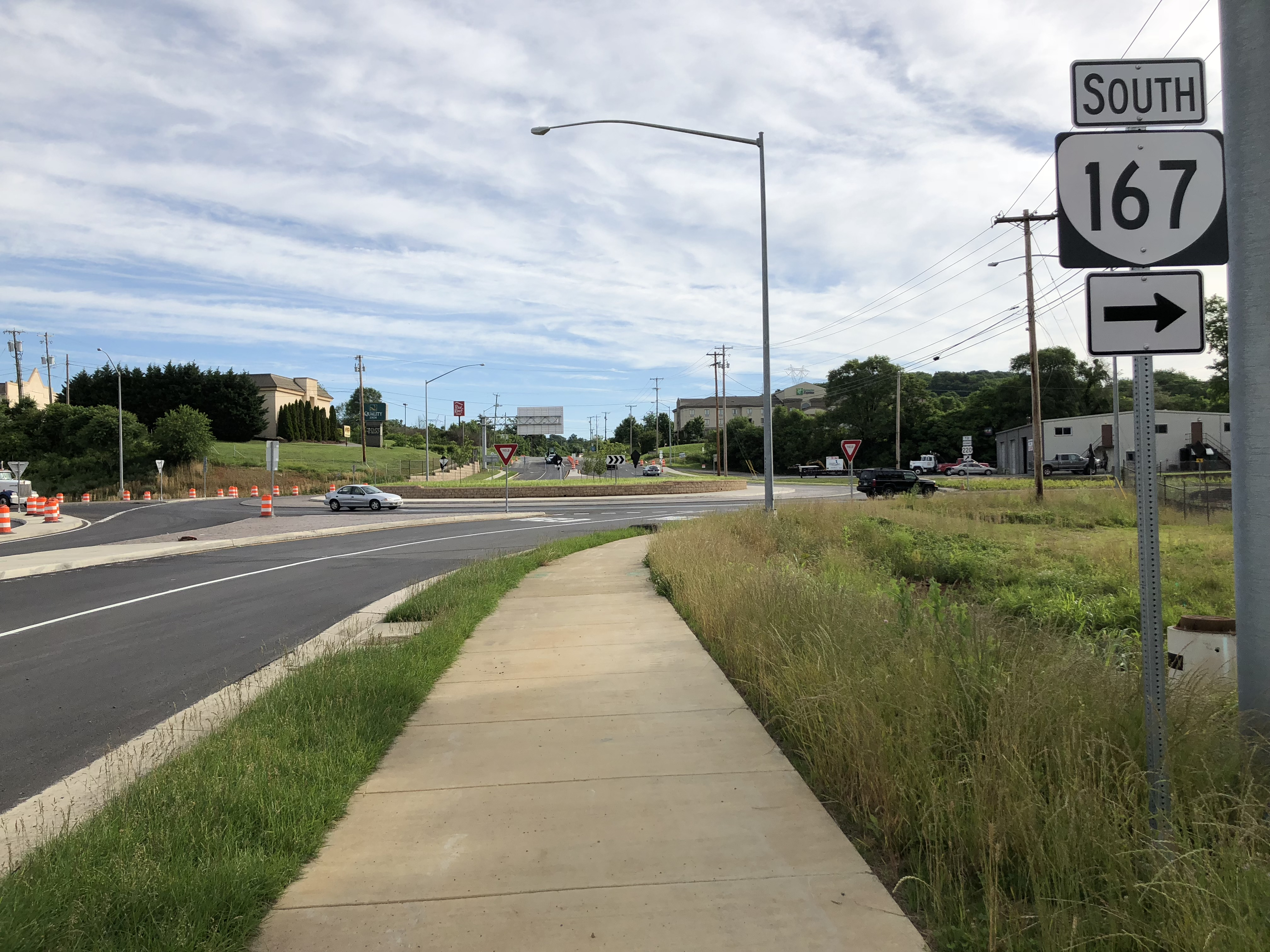
The north end of SR 167 at US 11 and I-81 in Botetourt County

Virginia State Route 167 (SR 167) is a state highway in Botetourt County, Virginia, in the United States. Known as Gateway Crossing, the road was completed in December 2016 as part of a project to ease congestion around the intersection of Interstate 81 (I-81), U.S. Route 220 Alternate (US 220 Alt.) and US 11 in southern Botetourt County.

== SR 181 ==
State Route 181
- Location: Belle Haven
- Length: 0.95 mi (1,530 m)

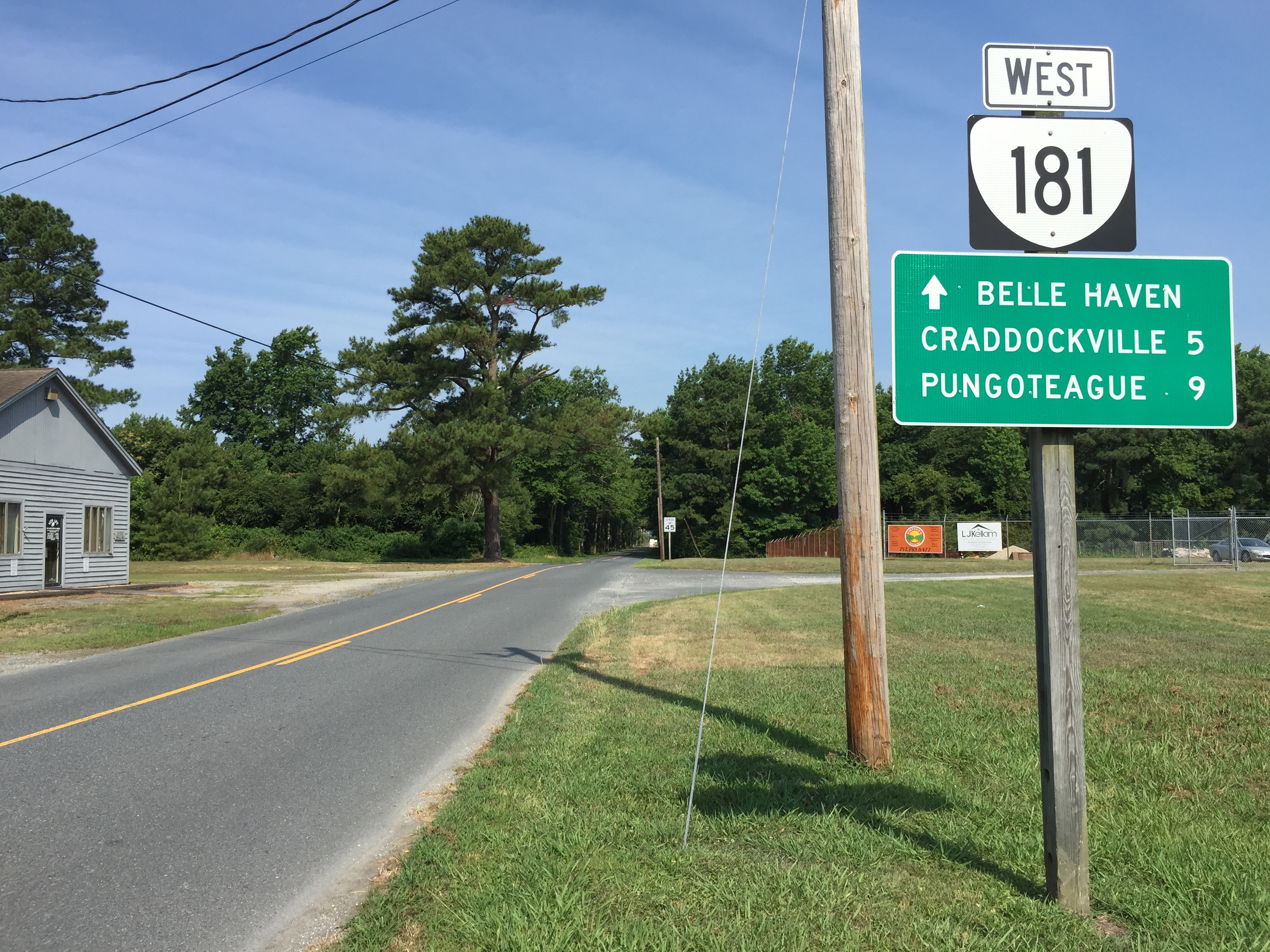
View west along SR 181 at US 13 near Belle Haven in Accomack County

State Route 181 is the designation for portions of Main Street and King Street in and near Belle Haven, Accomack County. The state highway begins at an indeterminate point in the town; the highway continues north as SR 609. Just north of Main Street's intersection with SR 178, which heads west as Shields Bridge Road and south as Belle Haven Road, SR 181 turns east onto King Street, which the highway follows to its eastern terminus at US 13.

== SR 188 ==
State Route 188
- Location: Clifton Forge
- Length: 0.91 mi (1,460 m)

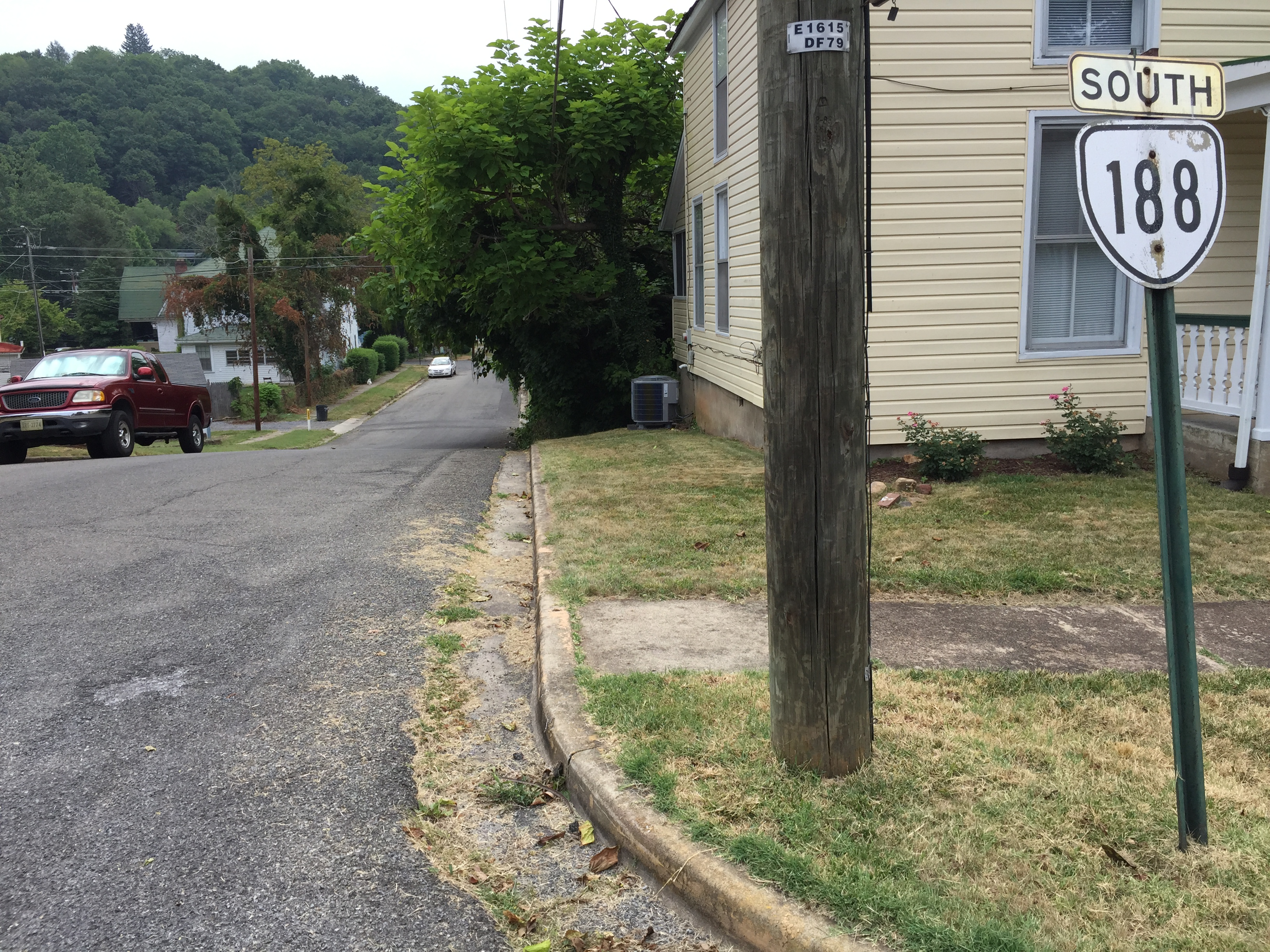
View south along SR 188 in Clifton Forge

State Route 188 runs 0.91 miles (1,460 m) through the city streets of Clifton Forge. The state highway begins at the intersection of westbound Main Street and eastbound Ridgeway Street, a one-way pair that carries US 60 Business and US 220 Business in the downtown area. SR 188 heads west on Main Street and turns north onto McCormick Boulevard. McCormick Boulevard is one-way northbound until Church Street; southbound SR 188 follows Church Street east and Commercial Street south to Main Street. SR 188 continues north on McCormick Boulevard to Lafayette Street, which the state highway follows one block west. The state highway turns north on Rose Avenue, west on Tremont Street, and north on Sioux Avenue to its northern terminus just south of the road's underpass of I-64, US 60, and US 220.

== SR 196 ==
State Route 196
- Location: Chesapeake
- Length: 0.96 mi (1,540 m)

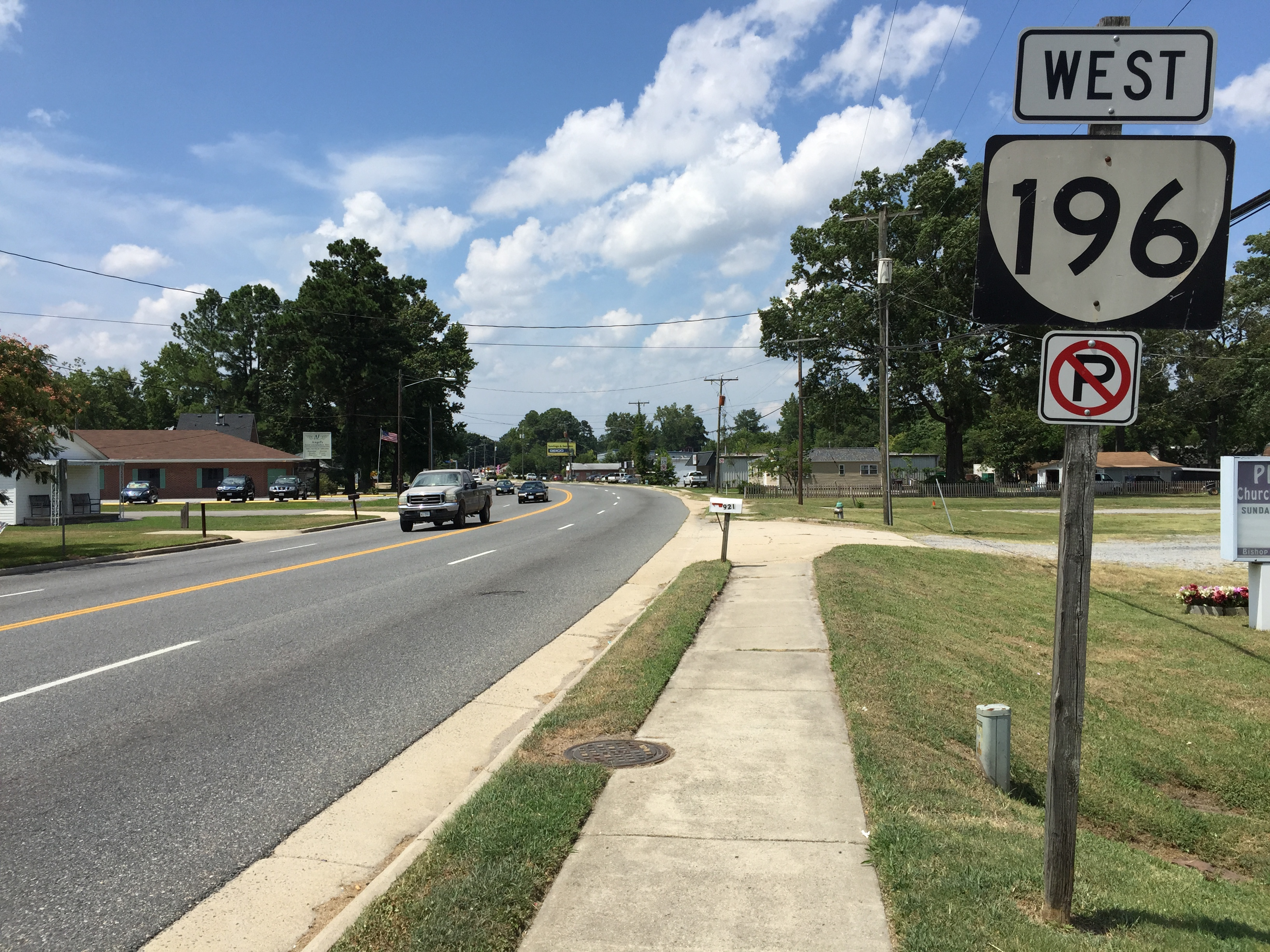
View west along SR 196 in Chesapeake

State Route 196 is the designation for the 0.96-mile (1,540 m) portion of Canal Drive from Military Highway, which carries US 13 and US 460, north to US 17 near the Deep Creek area of the city of Chesapeake.

== SR 209 ==
State Route 209
- Location: Herndon
- Length: 0.88 mi (1,420 m)

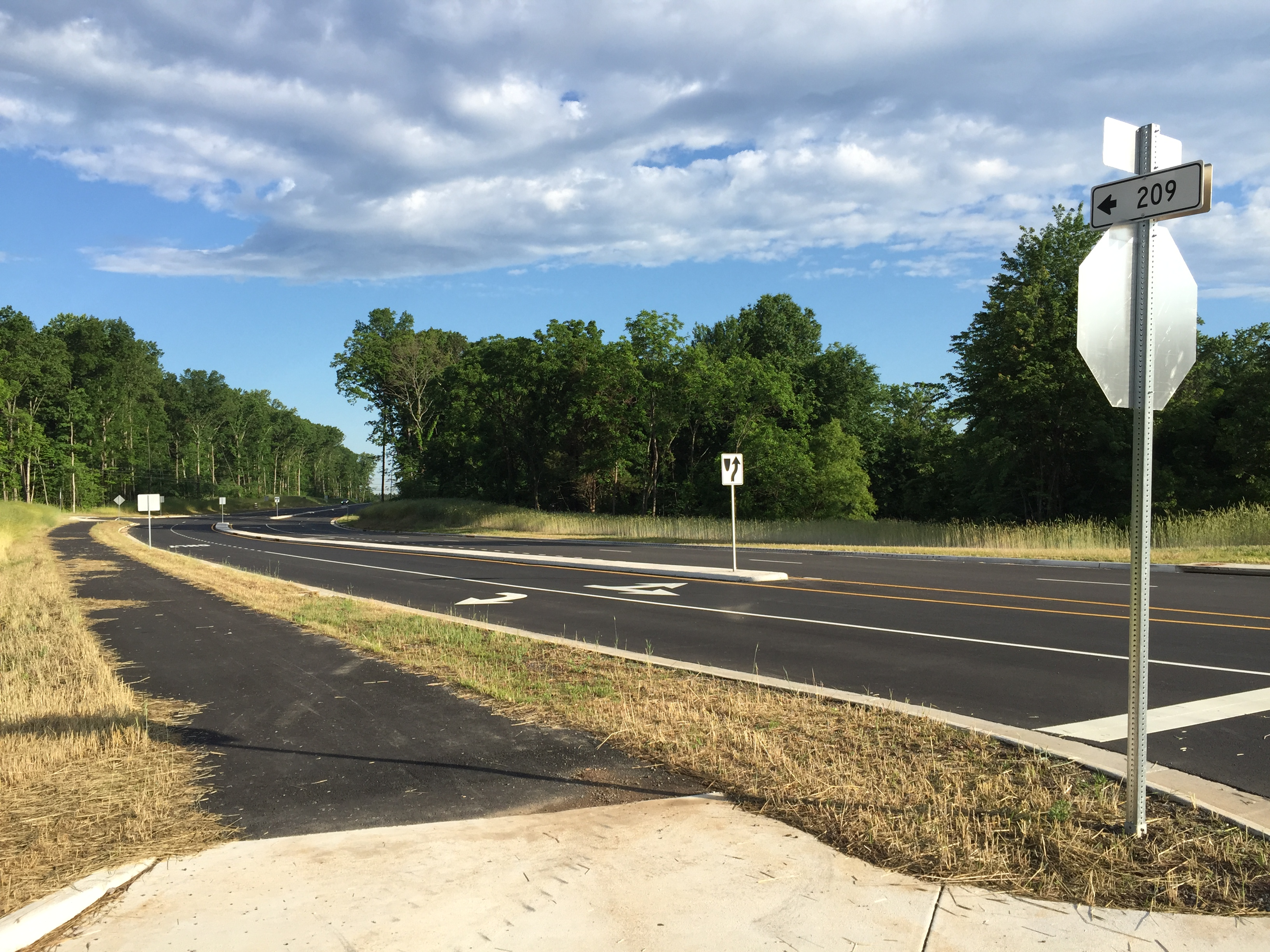
View west from the new eastern terminus of SR 209 at Rock Hill Road west of Herndon. The route was realigned at the end of 2016. The only signage indicating route number are the small white rectangular signs in this picture.

State Route 209 (SR 209) is the mostly unsigned designation for Innovation Avenue, which from 1990 to 2015 ran 0.88 miles (1,420 m) from an intersection with SR 28 (originally a signalized intersection, then from 2007 to 2015 a right-in/right-out interchange with northbound SR 28) east to the Center for Innovative Technology (CIT) on the eastern edge of Loudoun County near Herndon. At the east end of SR 209, at the line between Loudoun and Fairfax Counties, Innovation Avenue continued east and north as SR 847 to SR 605 (Rock Hill Road). In Fall 2011, construction began on expansion of the SR 28 interchange to a full interchange. In January 2016, the entire route (including the SR 28 interchange) was closed in order to complete the full trumpet interchange and to realign the entire highway to access the CIT on its north side, instead of the south. The project was completed in early 2017.

== SR 212 ==
State Route 212
- Location: Chatham Heights
- Length: 0.87 mi (1,400 m)

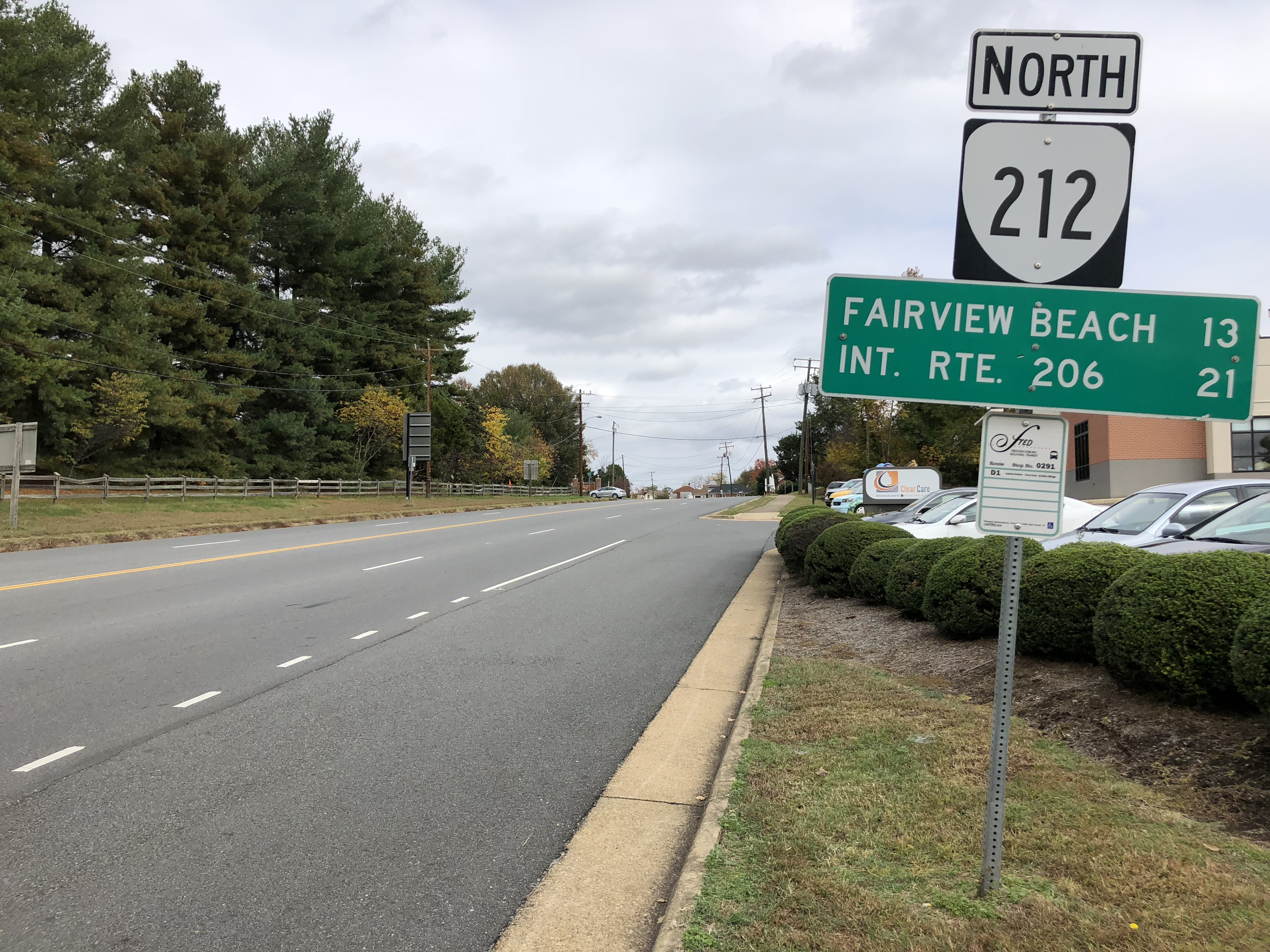
View north from the south end of SR 212 at SR 3 Bus. in Chatham Heights

State Route 212 is the designation for Chatham Heights Road, which runs 0.87 miles (1,400 m) from SR 3 Business north to SR 218 in the community of Chatham Heights just east of Fredericksburg. The entire route is part of U.S. Bicycle Route 1.

== SR 233 ==
State Route 233
- Location: Arlington
- Length: 0.36 mi (580 m)

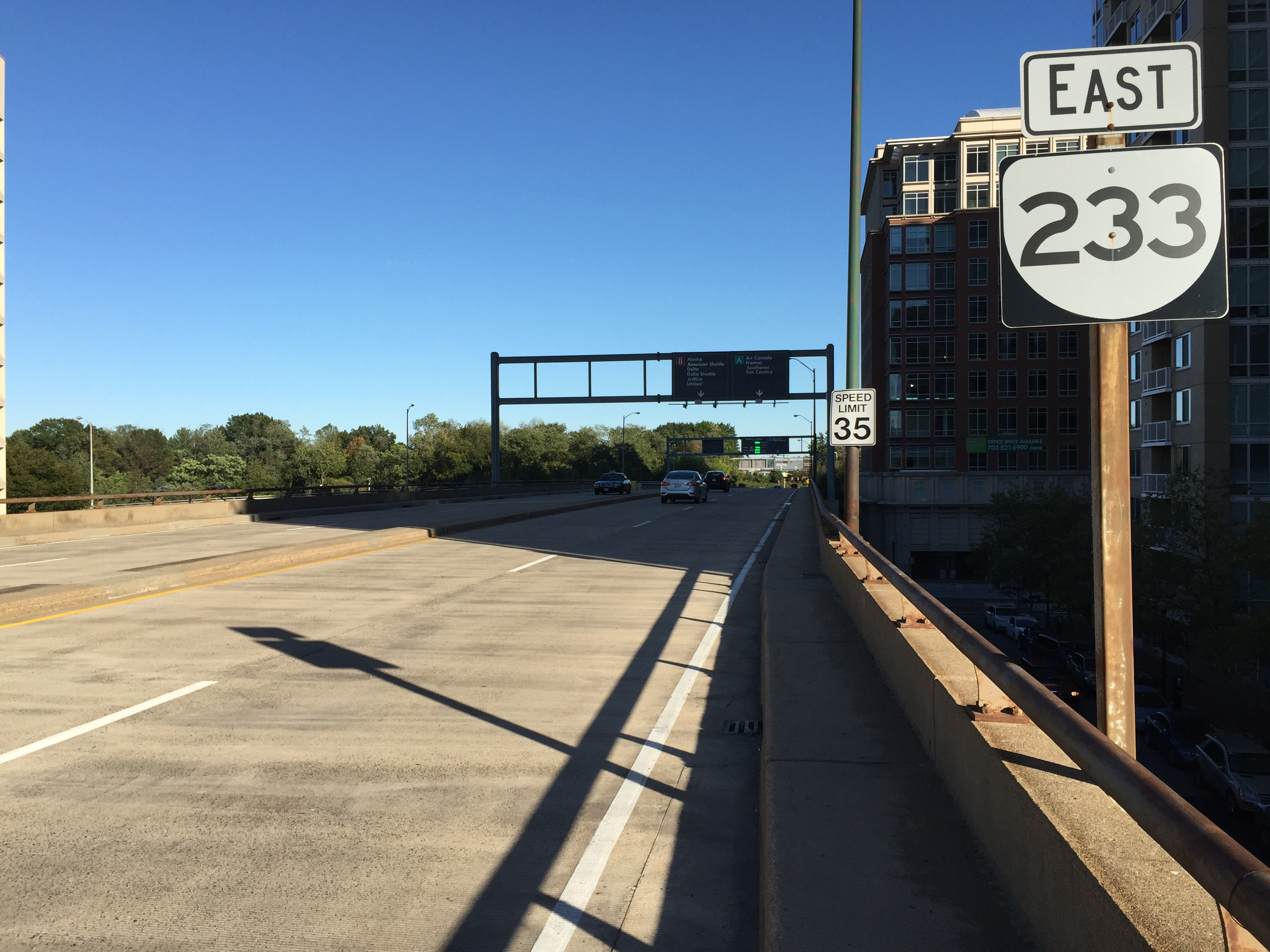
View east from the west end of SR 233 at US 1 in Crystal City in Arlington County

State Route 233 is the designation for the Airport Viaduct, a 0.36-mile (580 m) highway that runs east from a trumpet interchange with US 1 east to an entrance to Ronald Reagan Washington National Airport in the Crystal City section of Arlington. The state highway is entirely elevated from US 1 to its eastern terminus between CSX's RF&P Subdivision and the George Washington Memorial Parkway.

Major intersections
The entire route is in Arlington County. All exits are unnumbered.

Location	mi	km	Destinations	Notes
Crystal City	0.00	0.00	US 1 to I-395 / I-66 west – Alexandria, Crystal City, Washington	Trumpet interchange; western terminus
Crystal City	0.10	0.16	Crystal Drive	Westbound exit only
Reagan National Airport	0.36	0.58	George Washington Parkway south	Eastbound entrance only
Reagan National Airport	0.36	0.58	Ronald Reagan Washington National Airport	Eastern terminus; access roads continue east
1.000 mi = 1.609 km; 1.000 km = 0.621 mi

== SR 246 ==
State Route 246
- Location: Chesapeake
- Length: 0.76 mi (1,220 m)

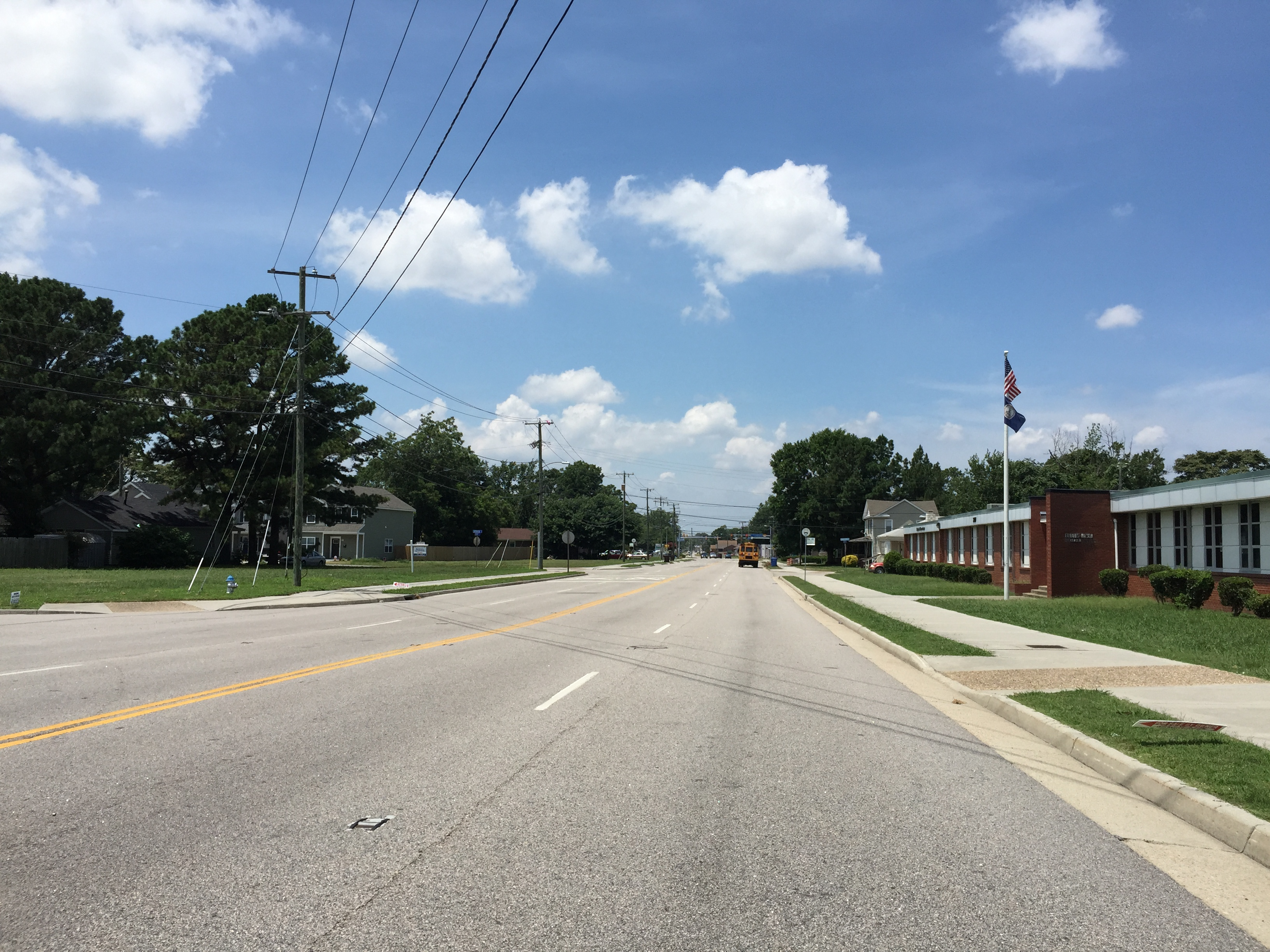
View west along SR 246 at Stonehurst Street in Chesapeake

State Route 246 is the designation for a 0.76-mile (1,220 m) section of Liberty Street in the South Norfolk section of the city of Chesapeake. The state highway starts at Poindexter Street, which carries US 460 and SR 166 south from the intersection; the two other highways head west on Liberty Street before turning north onto 22nd Street. SR 246's eastern terminus is at Campostella Road at the road's junction with SR 168.

== SR 270 ==
State Route 270
- Location: St. Paul
- Length: 0.26 mi (420 m)

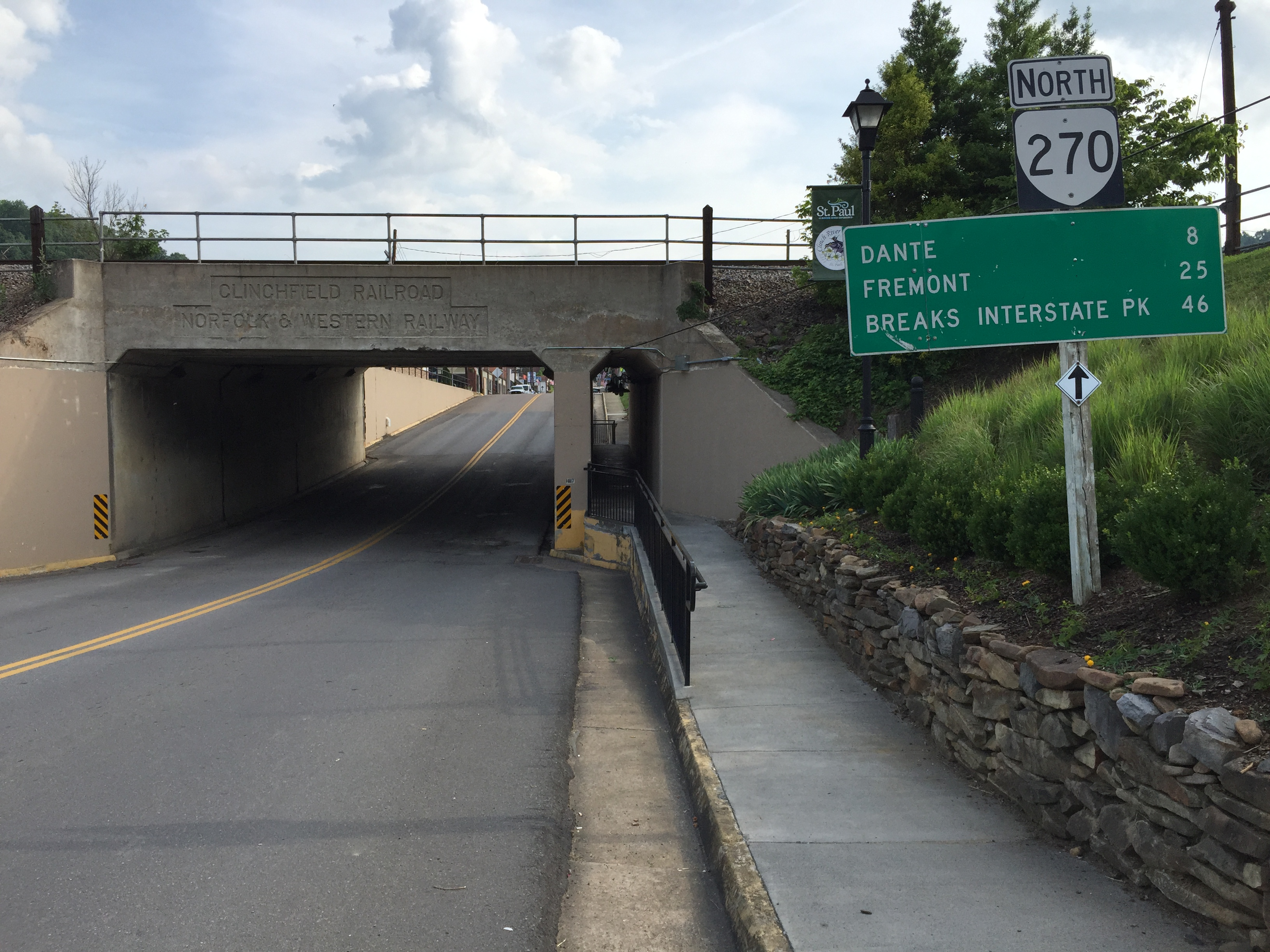
View north along SR 270 in St. Paul

State Route 270 is the designation for the 0.26-mile (420 m) portion of 4th Street between US 58 Alternate and SR 63 in the town of St. Paul.

== SR 283 ==
State Route 283
- Location: Norton
- Length: 0.36 mi (580 m)

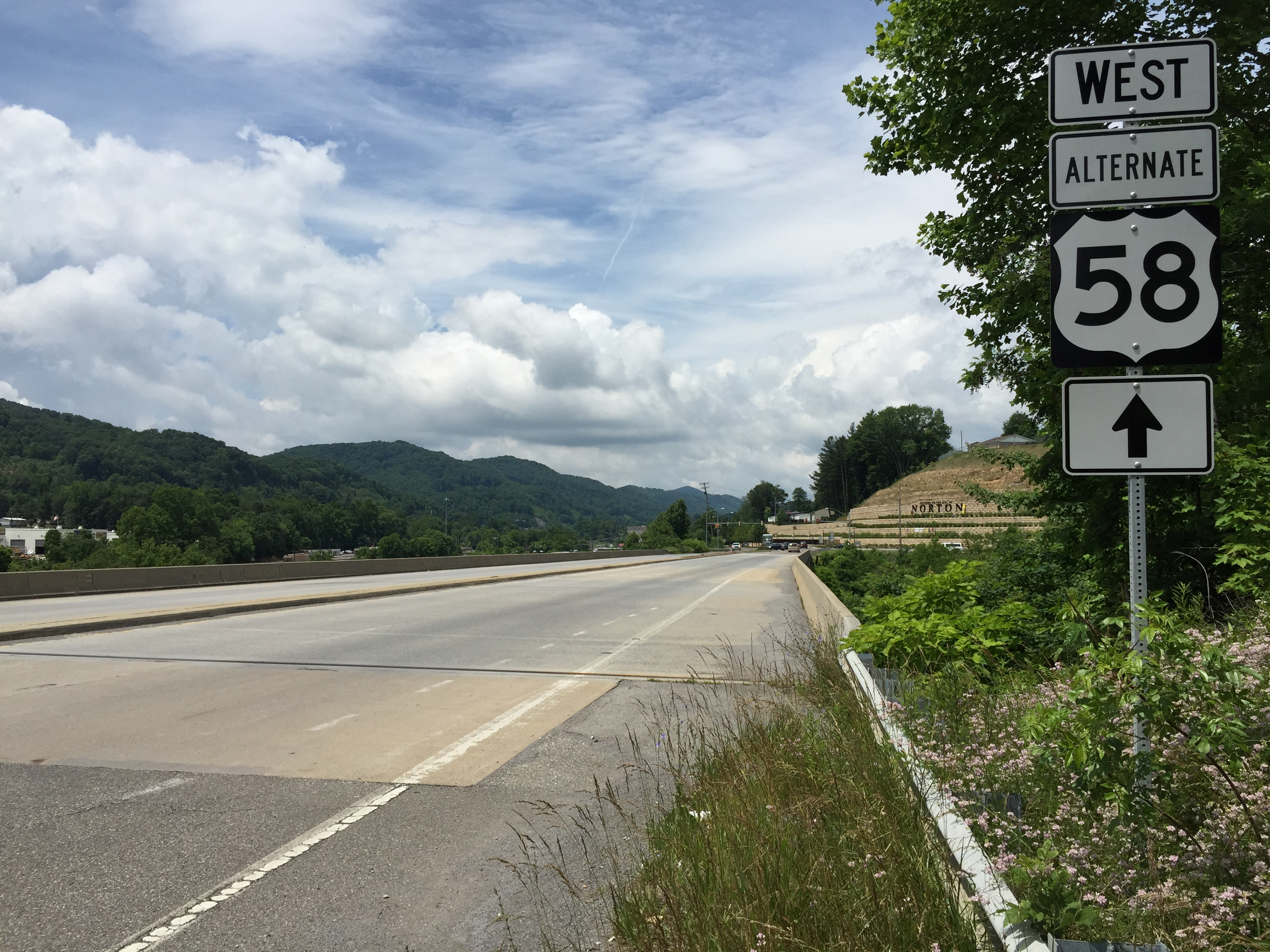
View west along unsigned SR 283 and US 58 Alt. Bus. in Norton

State Route 283 is the designation for a 0.36-mile (580 m) portion of the Trail of the Lonesome Pine in the city of Norton. The state highway begins at Park Avenue, which heads west and north as US 23 Business and US 58 Alternate Business. SR 283's eastern terminus is at an interchange with US 23 and US 58 Alternate. The entire road is also part of U.S. Route 58 Alternate Business.

== SR 290 ==
State Route 290
- Location: Dayton
- Length: 0.61 mi (980 m)

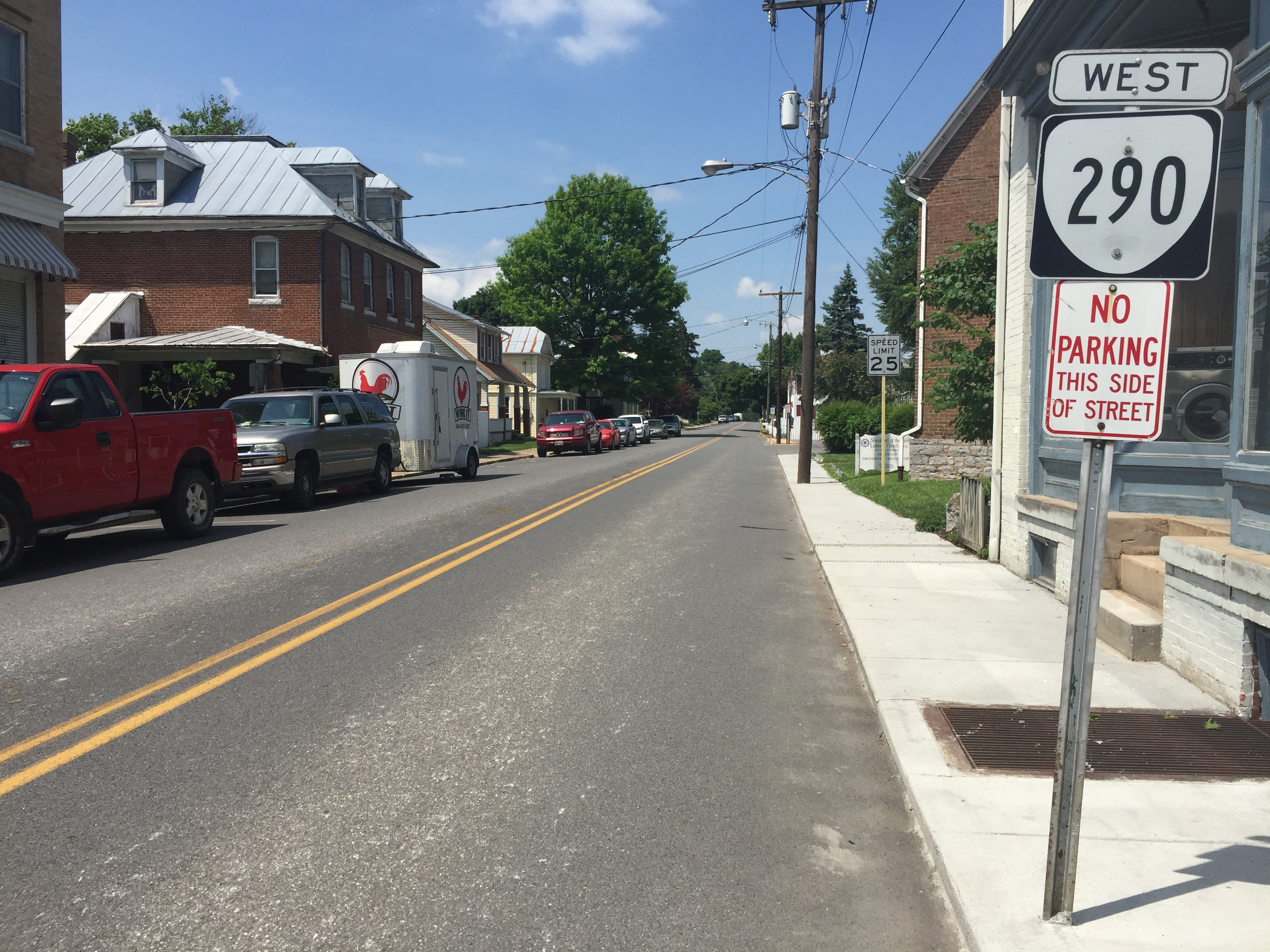
View west along SR 290 in Dayton

State Route 290 is the designation for College Street in the town of Dayton. The state highway, which has a length of 0.61 miles (980 m) between the east and north town limits of Dayton, also follows a small piece of Huffman Drive and has a short concurrency with SR 42 Business.

== SR 292 ==
State Route 292
- Location: Mount Jackson
- Length: 0.39 mi (630 m)

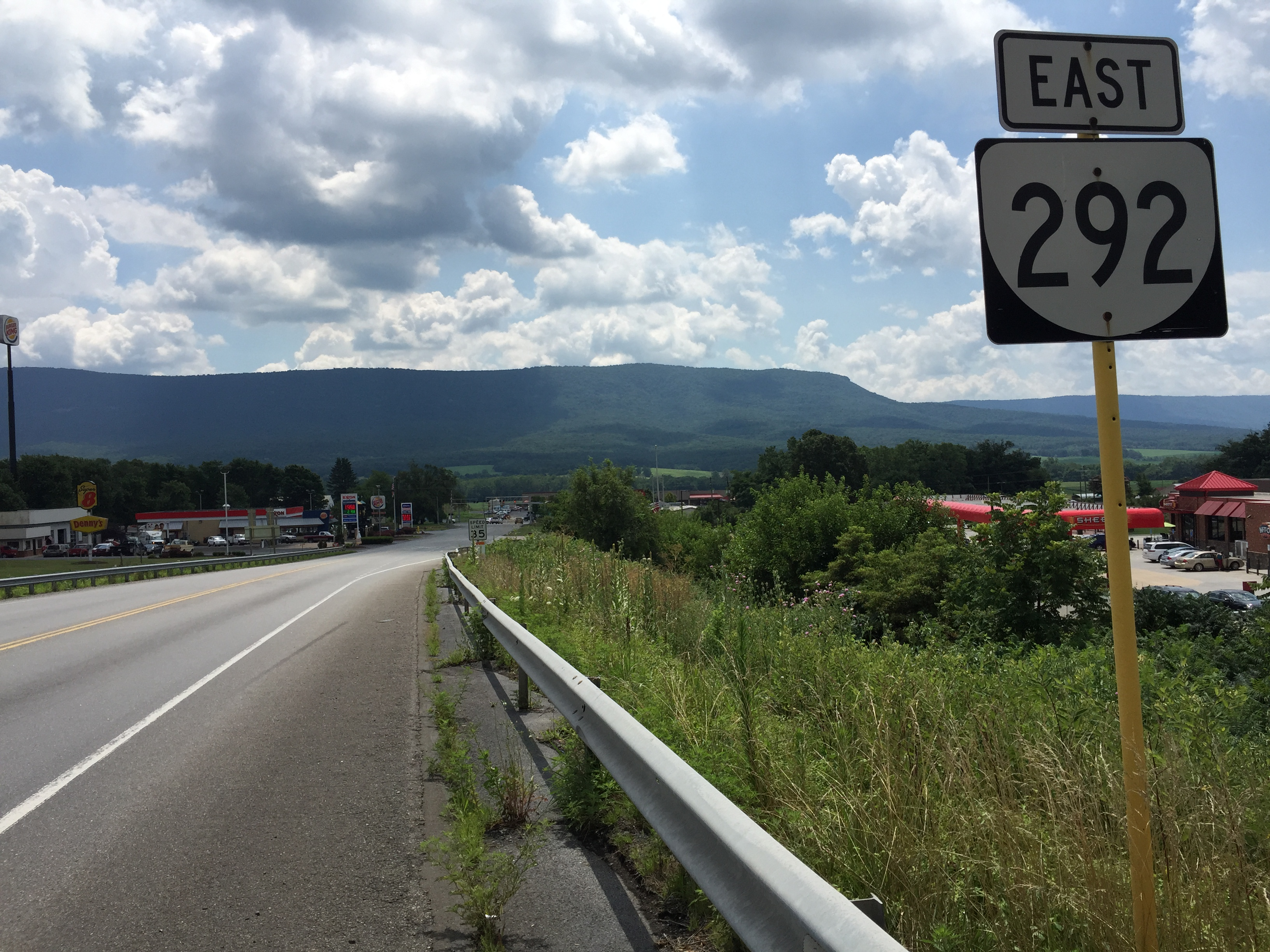
View east from the west end of SR 292 at I-81 in Mount Jackson

State Route 292 is the designation for Conicville Road, a 0.39-mile (630 m) connector between I-81 and US 11 in Mount Jackson.

== SR 296 ==
State Route 296
- Location: West Point
- Length: 0.39 mi (630 m)

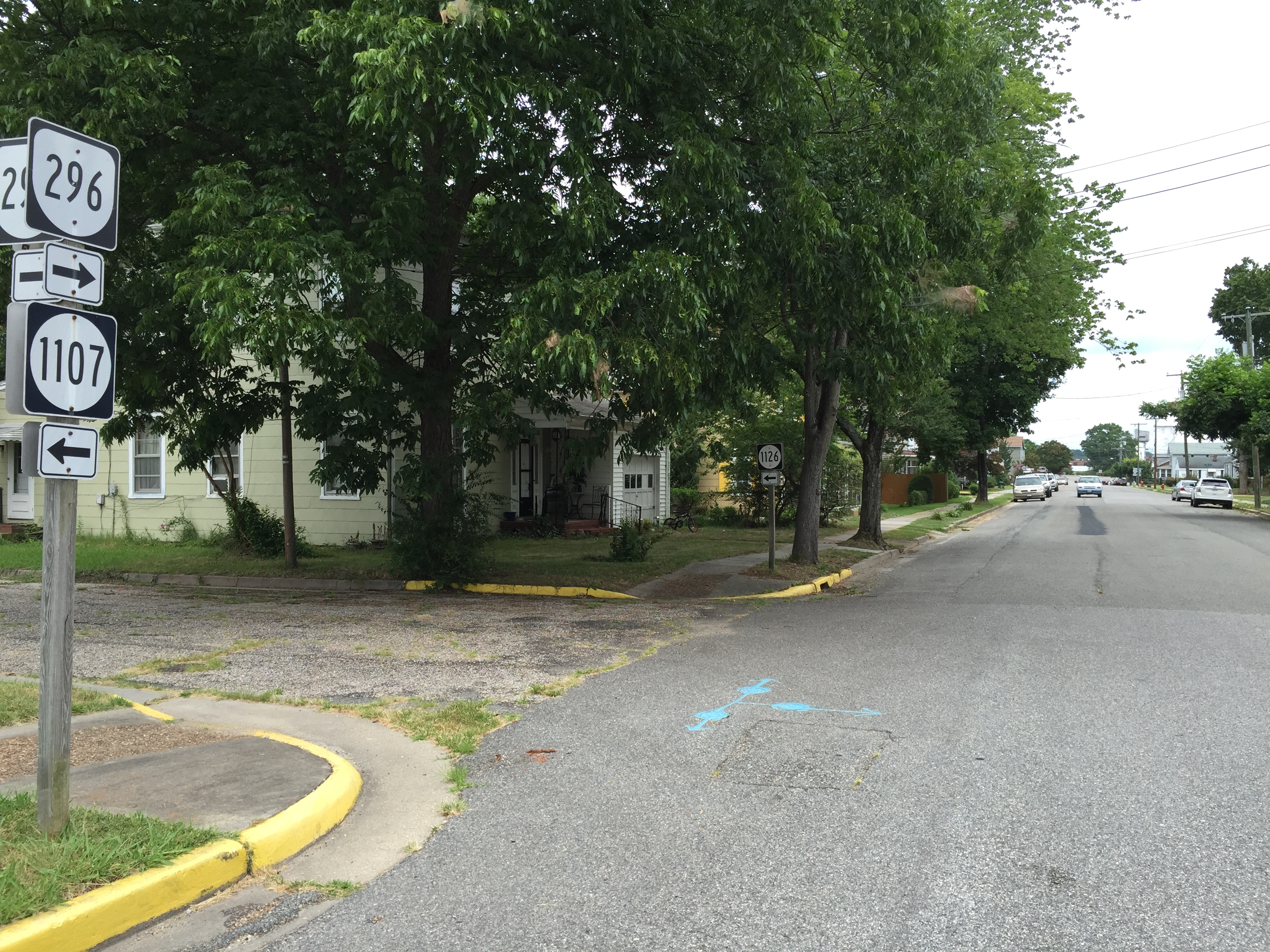
View northwest along SR 296 at 10th Street in West Point

State Route 296 is the designation for the cumulative 0.39-mile (630 m) portions of Kirby Street and 10th Street from SR 30 and SR 33 (14th Street) south and east to SR 298 (Lee Street) in the town of West Point.

== SR 298 ==
State Route 298
- Location: West Point
- Length: 0.75 mi (1,210 m)

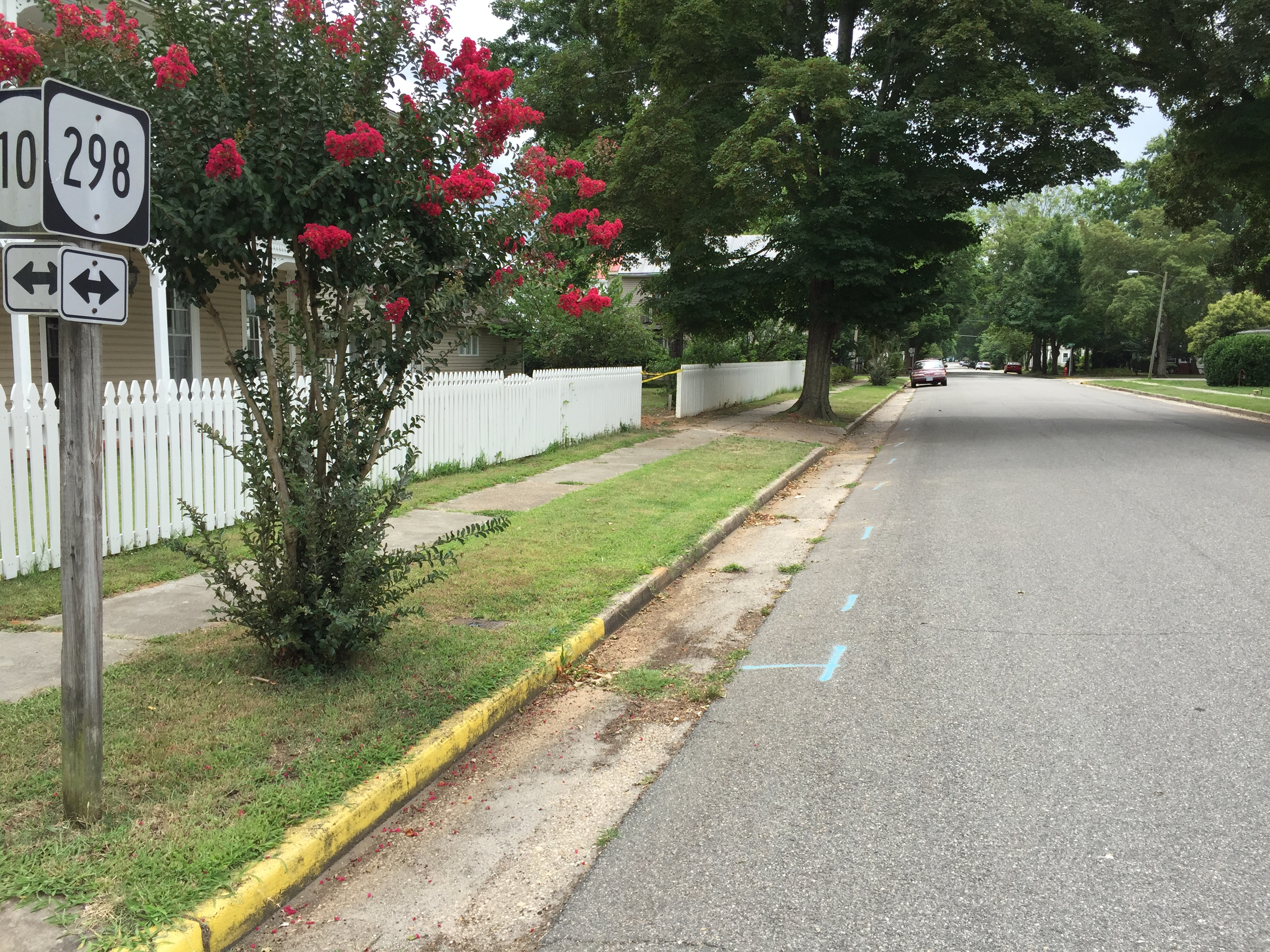
View southeast along SR 298 at 9th Street in West Point

State Route 298 is the designation for the cumulative 0.75-mile (1,210 m) portions of 5th Street and Lee Street from a dead end at the Pamunkey River east and north to SR 33 (14th Street) in the town of West Point.

== SR 299 ==
State Route 299
- Location: Culpeper
- Length: 0.79 mi (1,270 m)

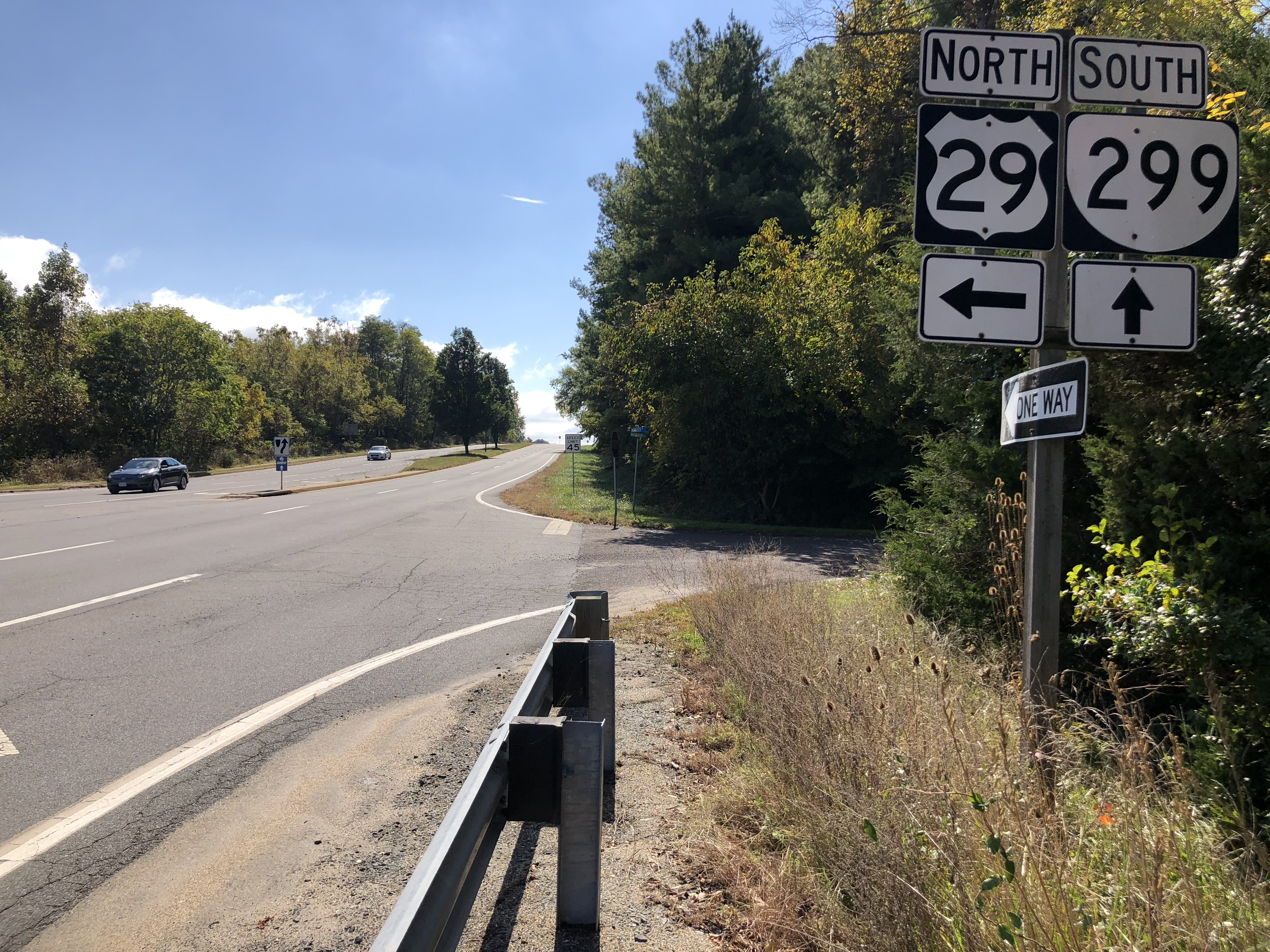
View south from the north end of SR 299 at US 29 southwest of Culpeper

State Route 299 is the designation for the 0.79-mile (1,270 m) section of Madison Road between US 15 and US 29 southwest of the town of Culpeper. Madison Road continues east into the town as US 29 Business.

== SR 300 ==
State Route 300
- Location: Powhatan
- Length: 0.64 mi (1,030 m)

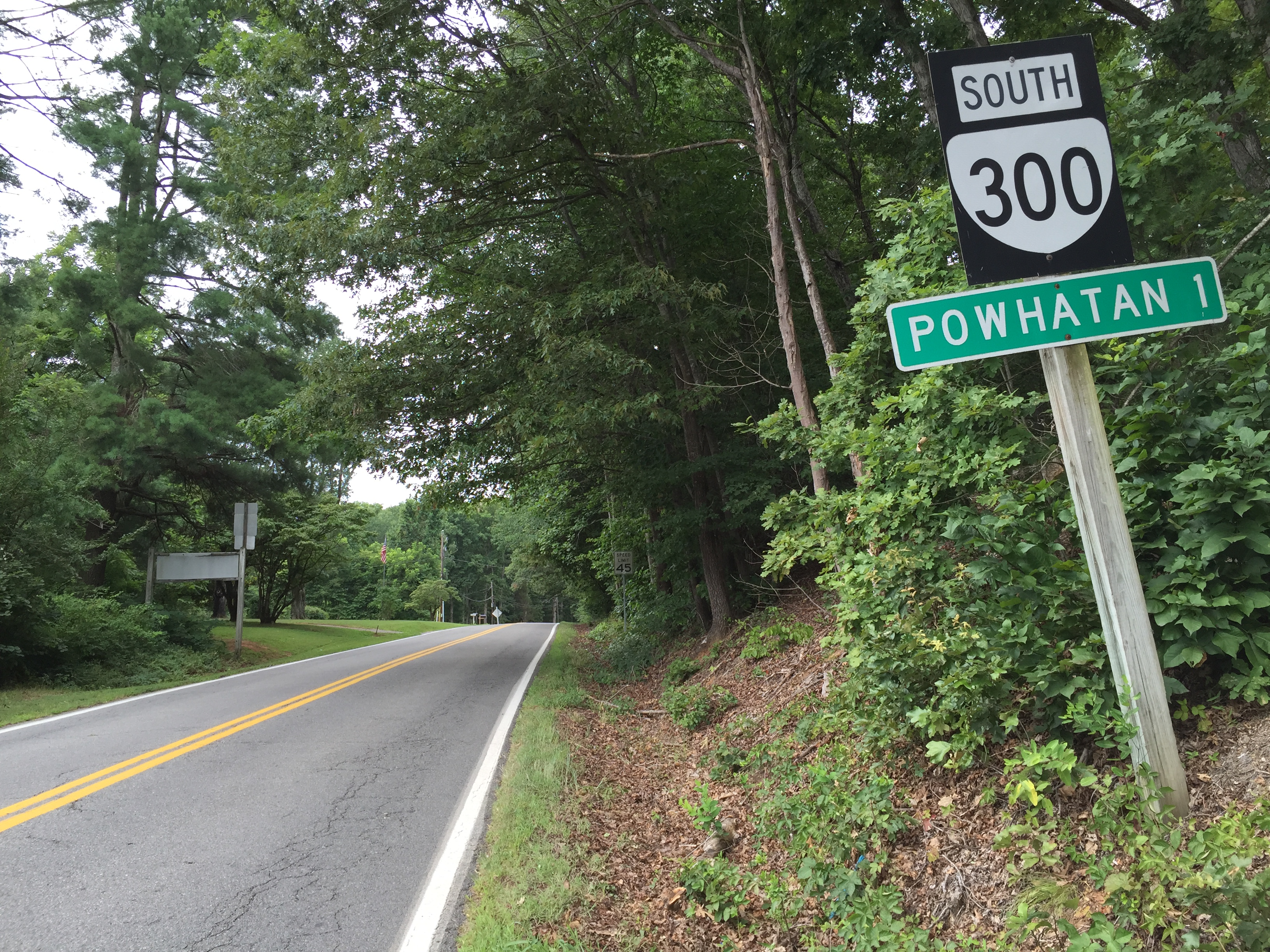
View south along SR 300 at US 60 in Powhatan

State Route 300 is a 0.64-mile (1,030 m) state highway in Powhatan. The state highway begins at SR 13 next to the Powhatan County courthouse. SR 300 heads east on Courthouse Tavern Lane, turns south onto Tilman Road, then turns east onto Scottsville Road to its eastern terminus at US 60. A wye route of SR 300, SR 300Y, runs 0.04 miles (210 ft; 64 m) along Tilman Road from Marion Harland Lane north to Scottsville Road on the southeast side of the courthouse property.

== SR 304 ==
State Route 304
- Location: South Boston
- Length: 0.71 mi (1,140 m)

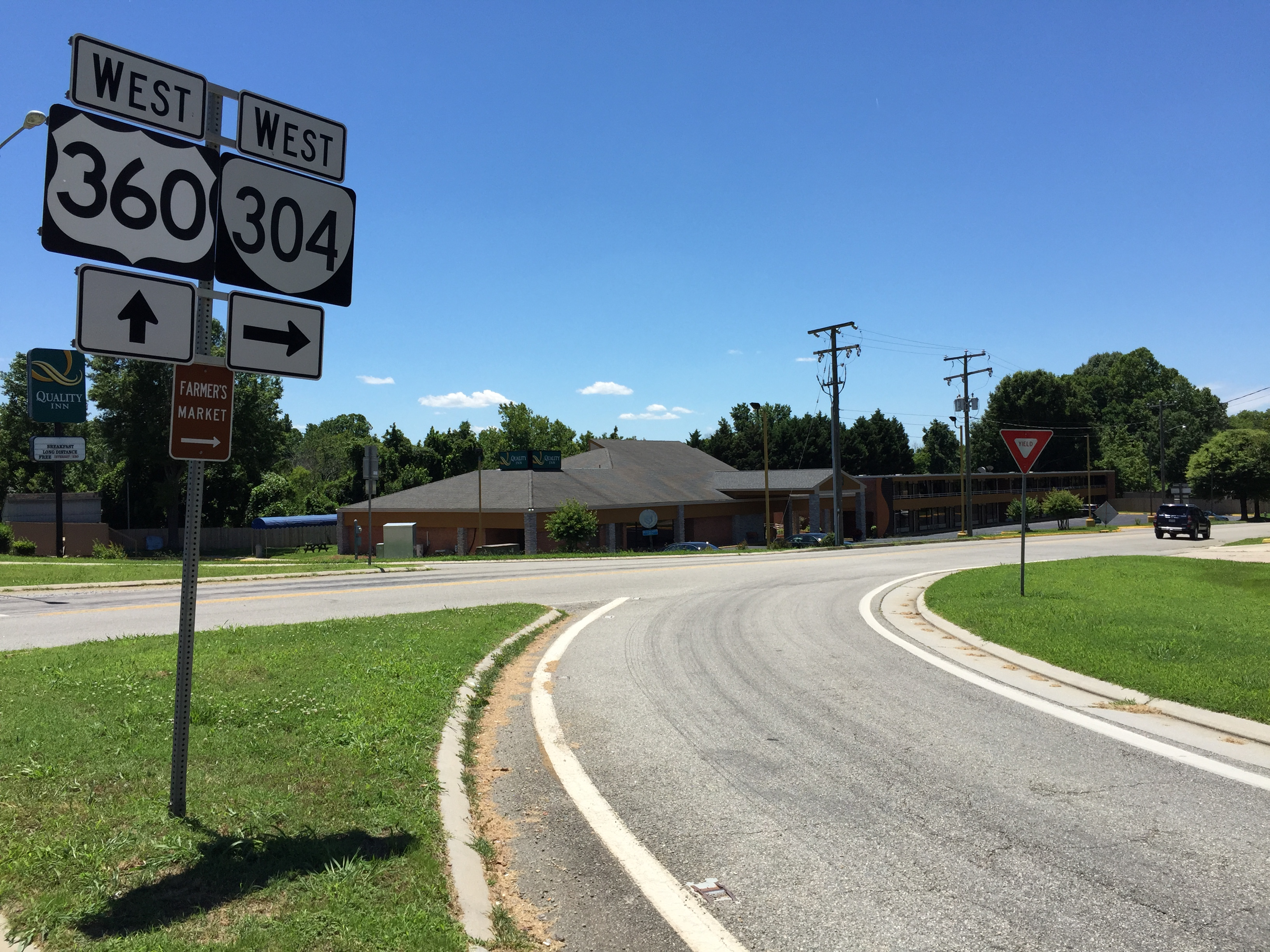
East end of SR 304 at US 360 in South Boston

State Route 304 is the designation for Seymour Drive, which runs 0.71 miles (1,140 m) from US 501 east to US 360 north of and parallel to the Dan River within the town of South Boston.

== SR 306 ==
State Route 306
- Location: Newport News
- Length: 0.88 mi (1,420 m)

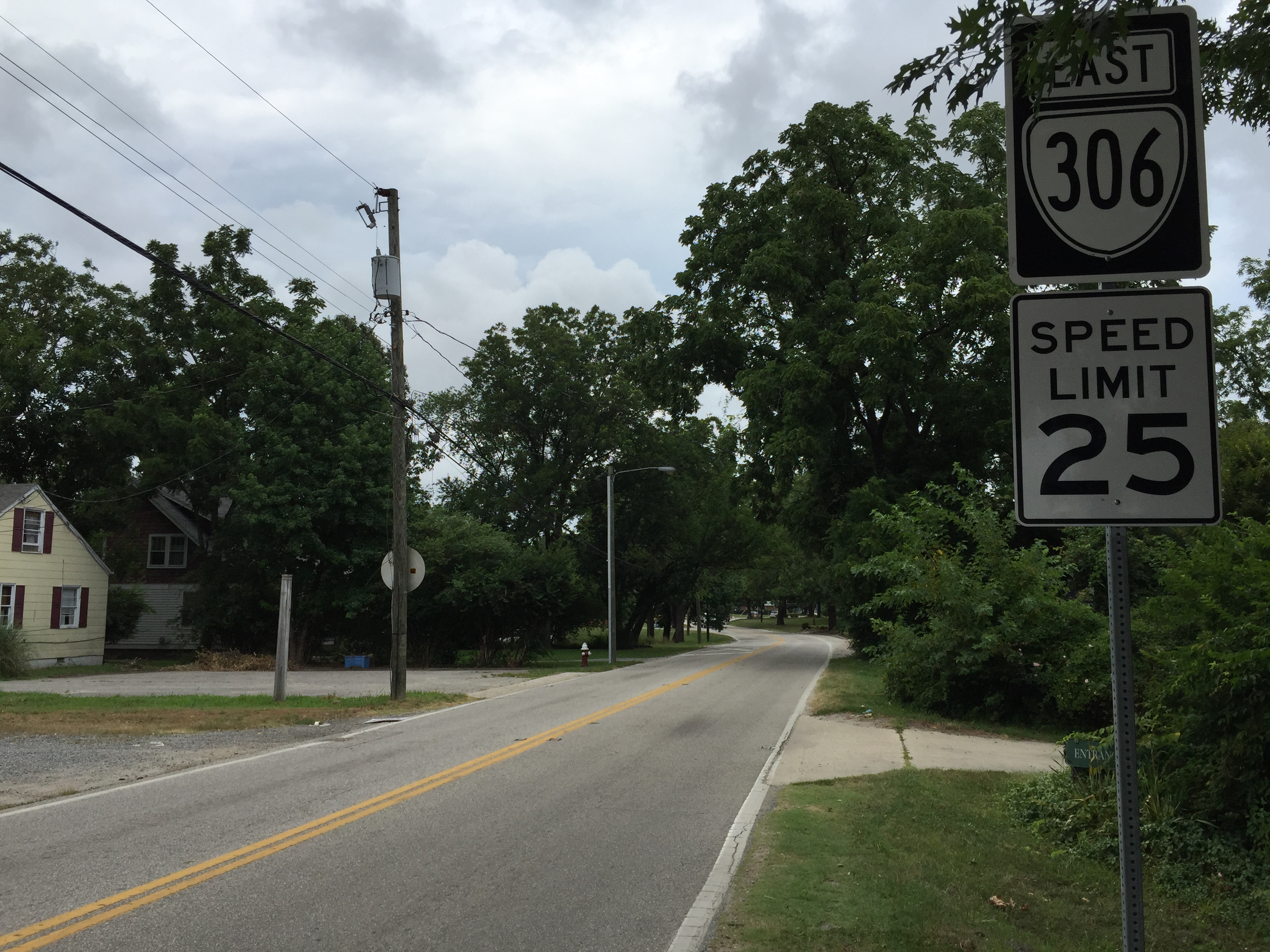
View east along SR 306 in Newport News

State Route 306 is the designation for the 0.88-mile (1,420 m) segment of Harpersville Road from US 60 east to US 17 and SR 143 within the city of Newport News.

== SR 349 ==
State Route 349
- Location: Halifax
- Length: 0.12 mi (190 m)

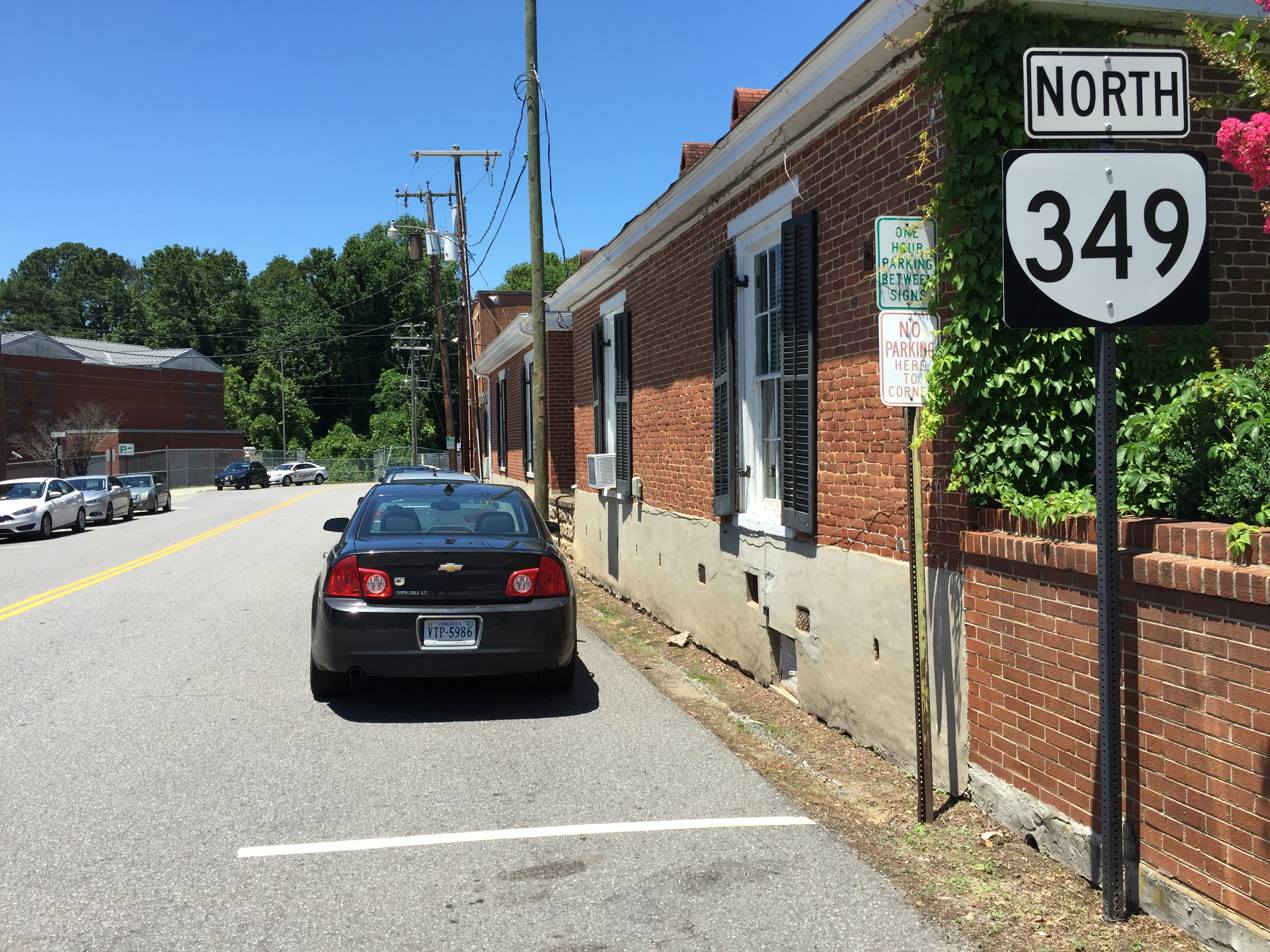
View north along SR 349 at US 501 in Halifax

State Route 349 is the unsigned designation for Edmunds Boulevard, a 0.12-mile (630 ft; 190 m) L-shaped highway that passes closely follows the west and south sides of the Halifax County Courthouse in the town of Halifax. The north and east sides of the courthouse are flanked by SR 360 and US 501, respectively.

== SR 359 ==
State Route 359
- Location: Jamestown
- Length: 0.34 mi (550 m)
- Tourist routes: Virginia Byway

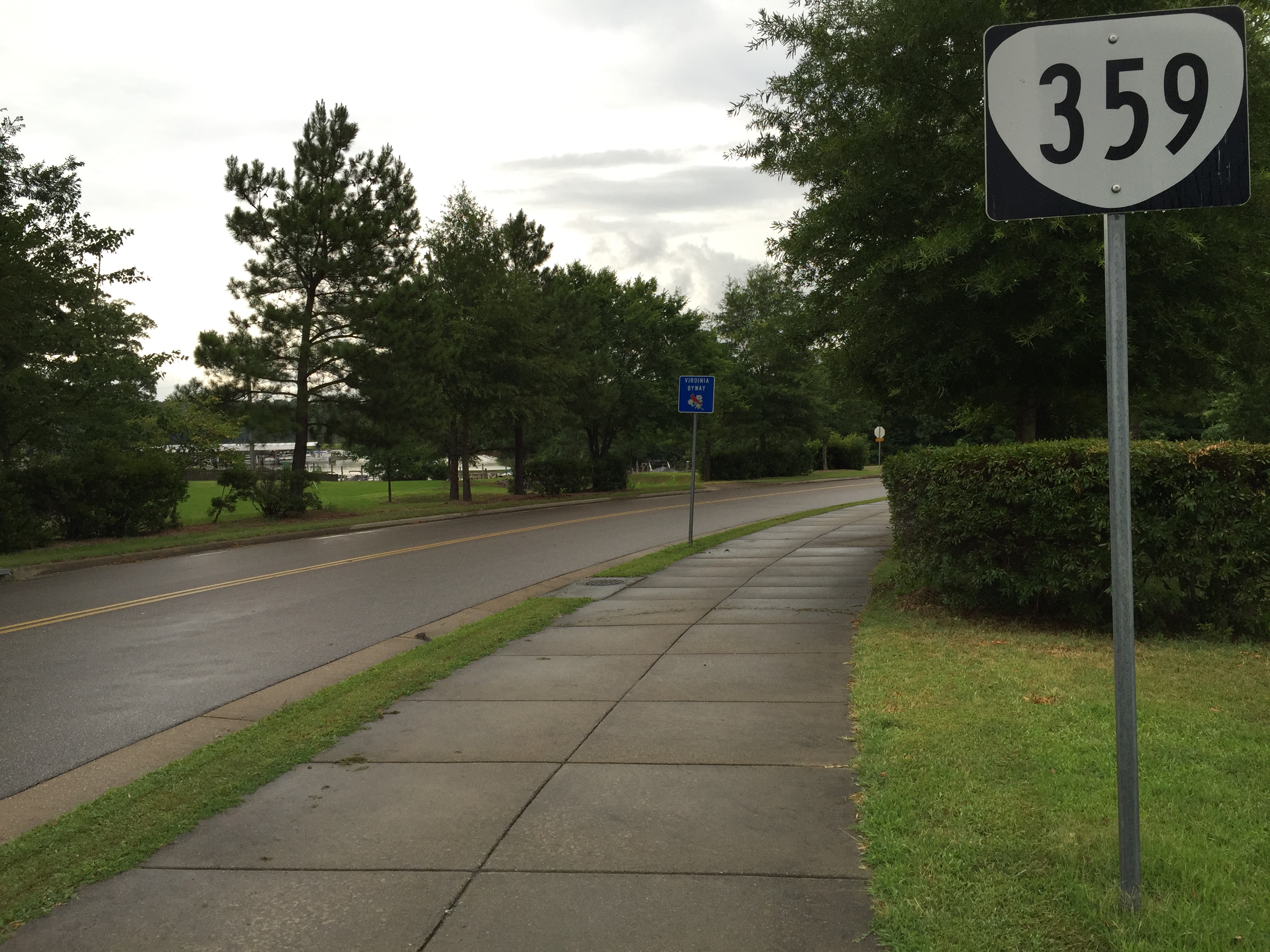
SR 359 southbound at SR 31 in Jamestown

State Route 359 is the designation for Jamestown Festival Parkway, a 0.34-mile (550 m) connector between Colonial Parkway and SR 31 near the site of the Jamestown settlement. The road was taken over by the state in 1959.

== SR 380 ==
State Route 380
- Location: Elko Tract
- Length: 0.8 mi (1,300 m)

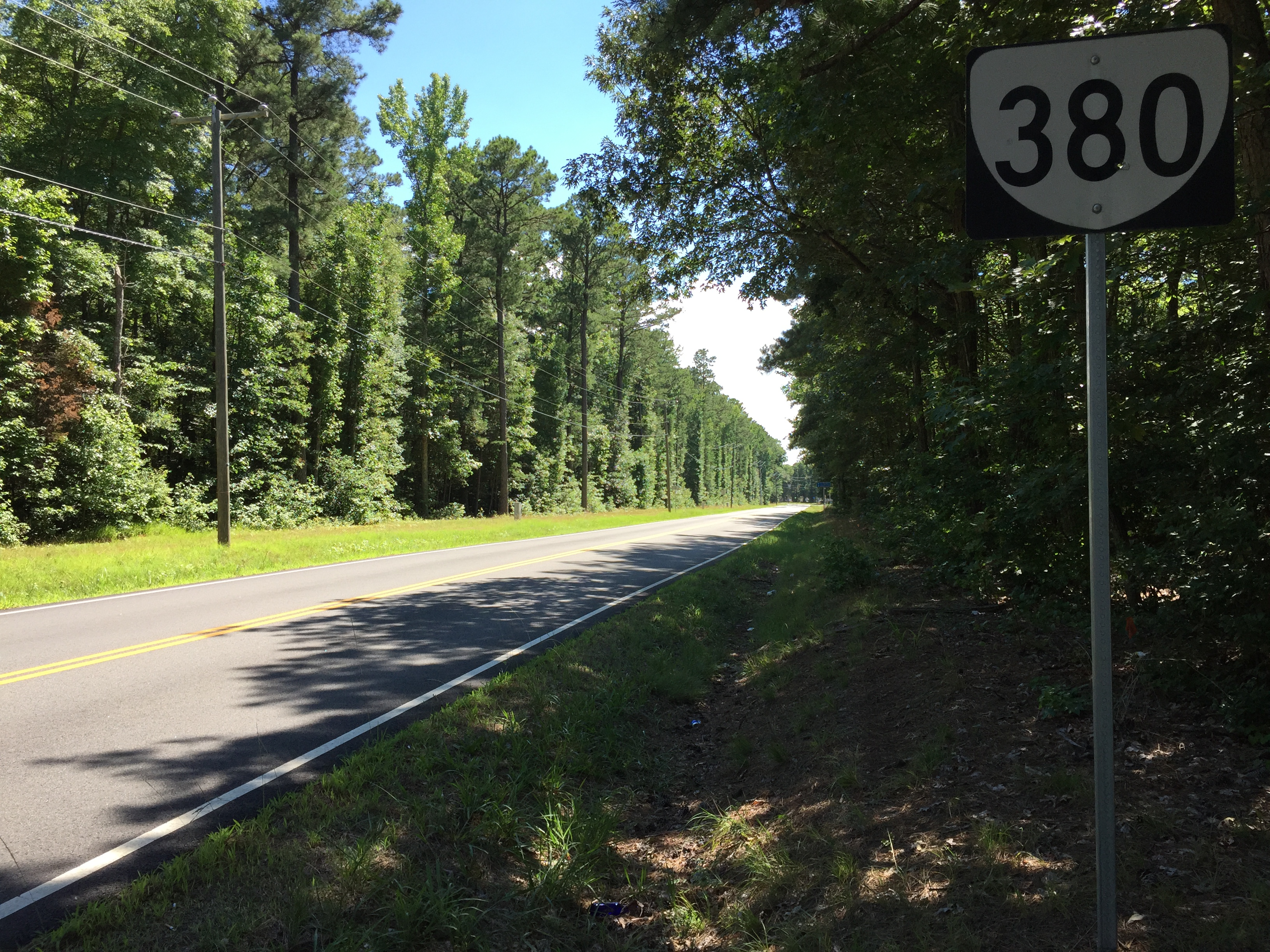
View south at the north end of SR 380 at SR 156 in Currituck Farms

State Route 380 is the designation for Elko Tract Road, a 0.34-mile-long (550 m) connector between Technology Boulevard and SR 156 in eastern Henrico County near Sandston. The route runs on the site of the Elko Tract, a former ghost town and World War II decoy city now being converted to an industrial park.

== SR 404 ==
State Route 404
- Location: Norfolk
- Length: 0.53 mi (850 m)

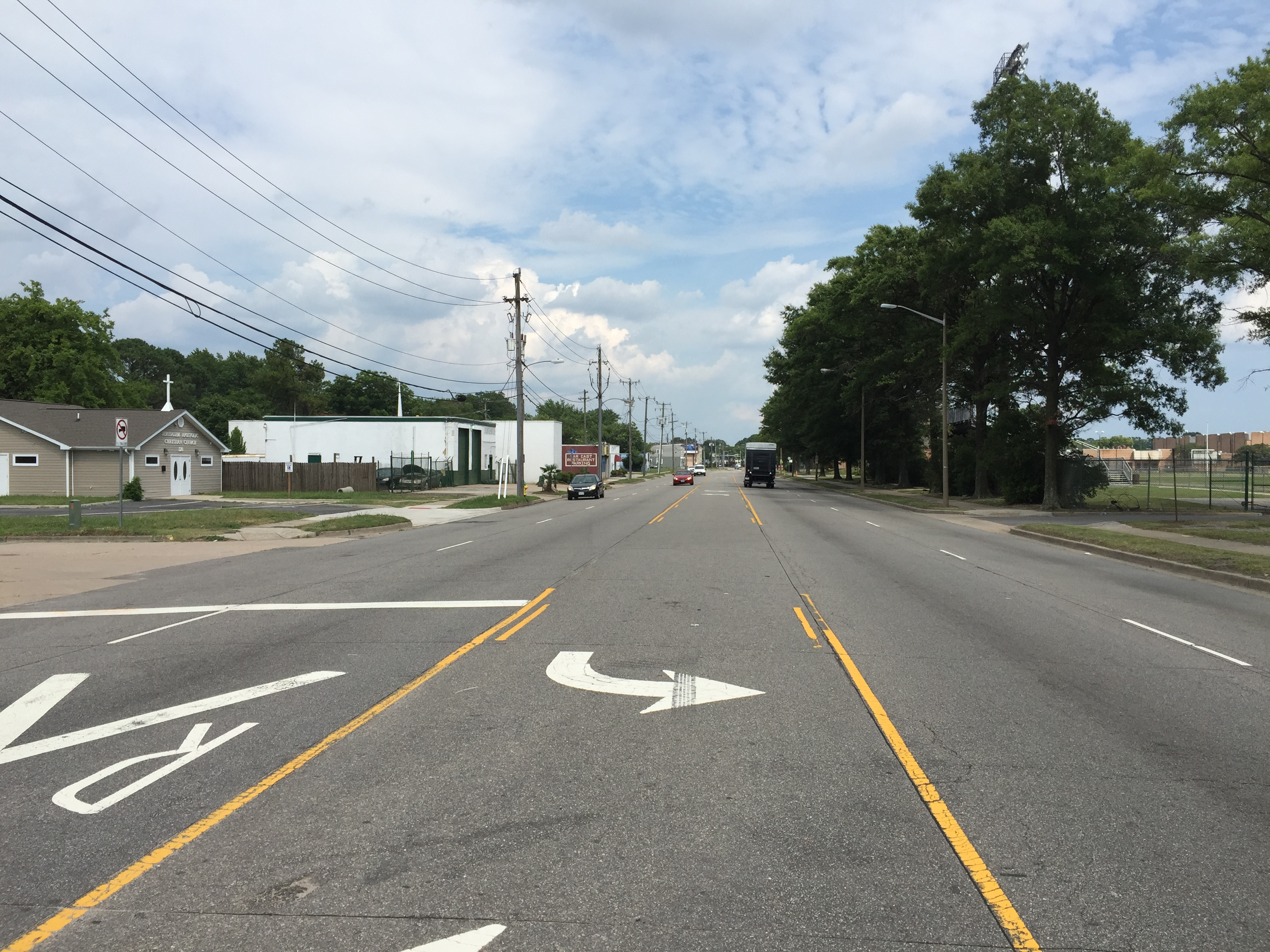
View east along SR 404 in Norfolk

State Route 404 is the designation for the 0.53-mile (850 m) segment of Princess Anne Road between SR 168 (Tidewater Drive) and SR 166 (Park Avenue) near the downtown area of Norfolk. Princess Anne Road continues west as a city street through the Ghent neighborhood and east as SR 166.

== SR 405 ==
State Route 405
- Location: Norfolk
- Length: 0.64 mi (1,030 m)

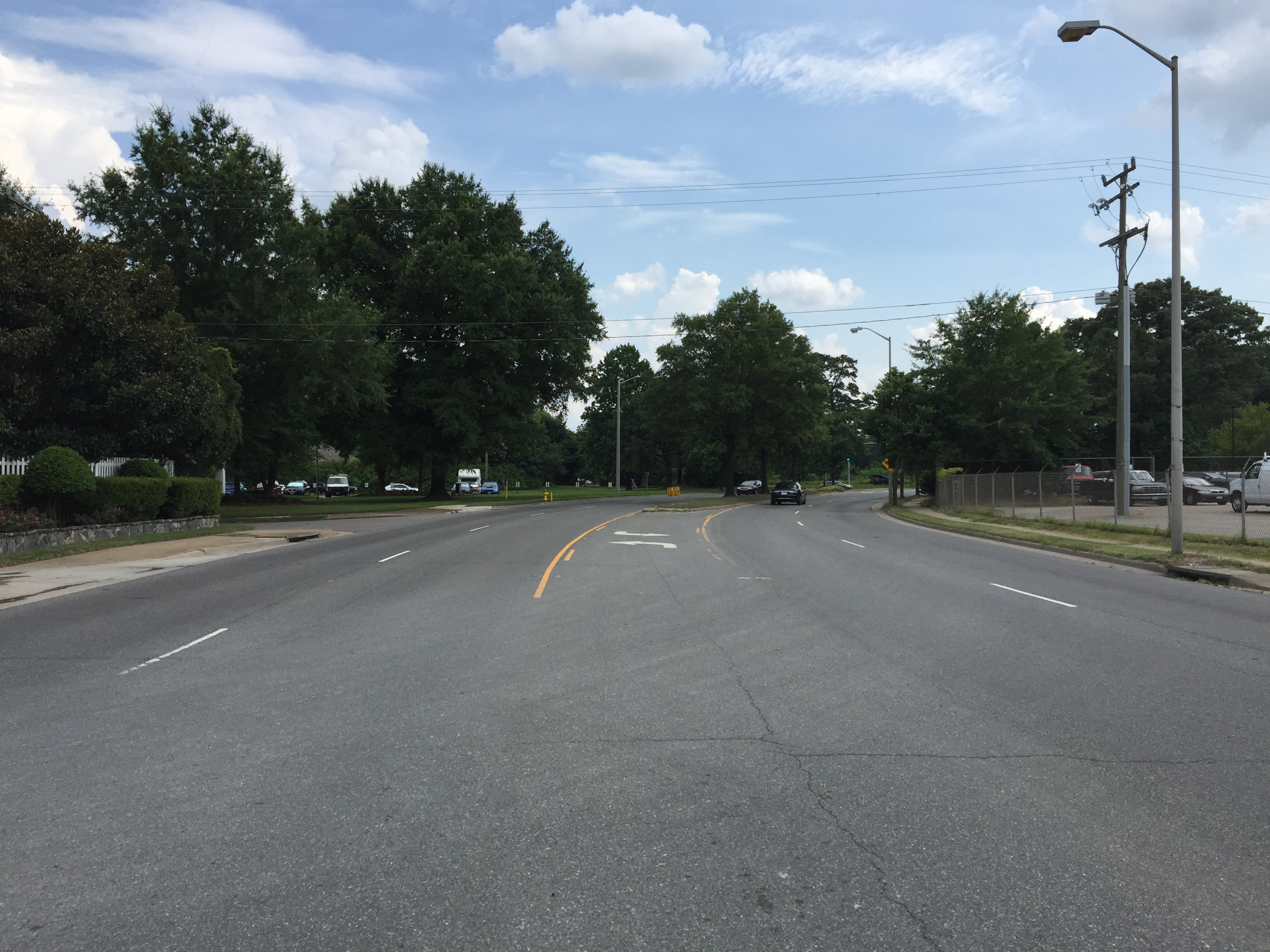
View south along SR 405 in Norfolk

State Route 405 is the designation for the 0.64-mile (1,030 m) segment of Ballentine Boulevard between I-264 and US 58 east of the downtown area of Norfolk.

== SR 409 ==
State Route 409
- Location: New Kent County
- Length: 0.2 mi (320 m)

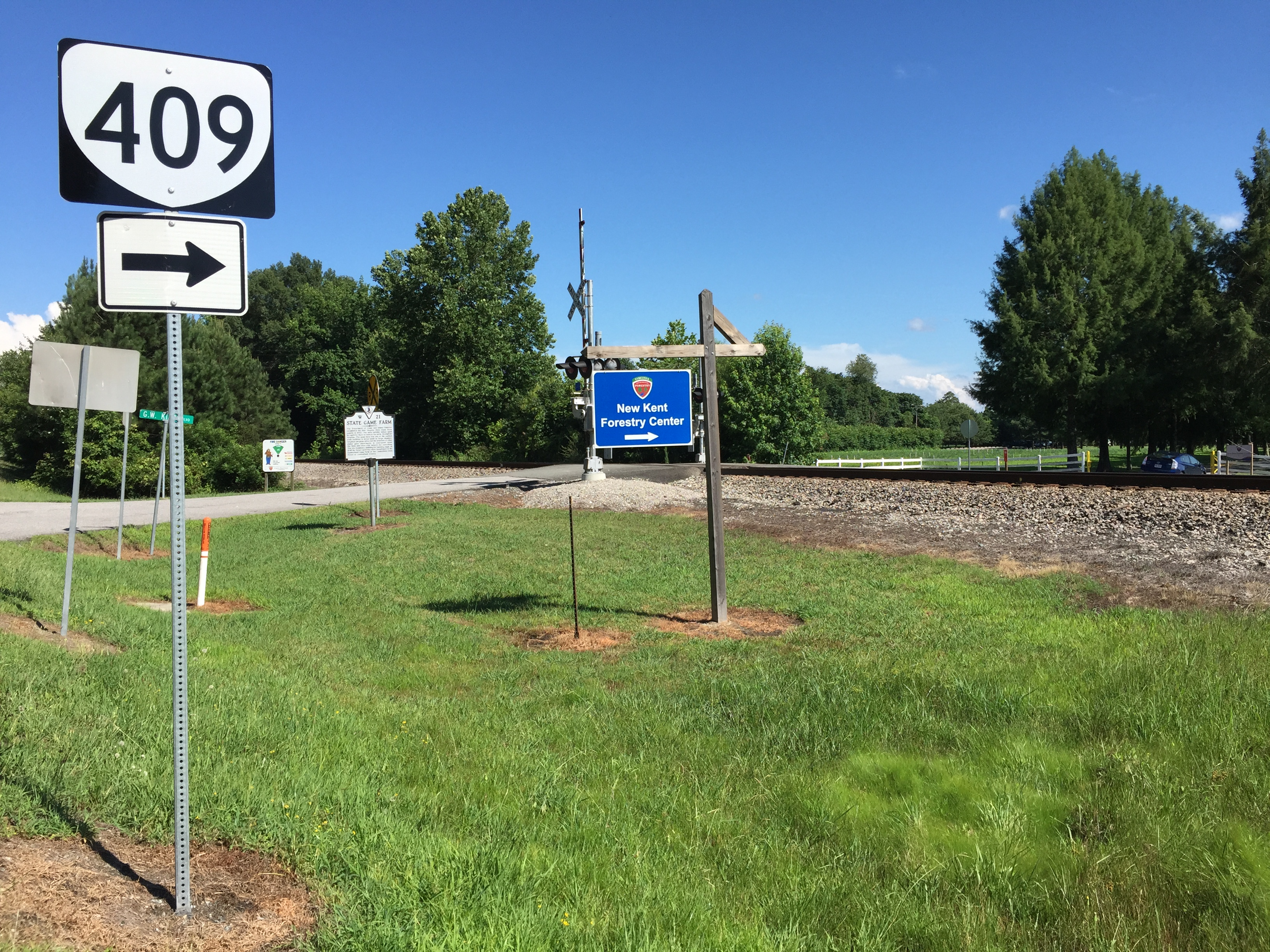
View south along SR 409 at US 60 at the Eastern Region, Virginia Forestry Service near Providence Forge

State Route 409 is the designation for the 0.2-mile (320 m) segment of G.W. King Boulevard from US 60 Pocahontas Trail to Eastern Region, Virginia Forestry Service near Providence Forge in New Kent County.
