= Virginia State Route 190 =

State highway in southeastern Virginia, US

State Route 190

Route information
- Maintained by VDOT
- Length: 15.43 mi (24.83 km)
- Existed: 1950s–present

Major junctions
- West end: SR 166 in Chesapeake
- US 17 in Chesapeake; SR 165 in Virginia Beach; I-264 in Virginia Beach; US 58 in Virginia Beach
- North end: SR 225 in Virginia Beach

Location
- Country: United States
- State: Virginia
- Counties: City of Chesapeake, City of Virginia Beach

Highway system
- Virginia Routes; Interstate; US; Primary; Secondary; Byways; History; HOT lanes
← SR 189	→ SR 191

State Route 190 (SR 190) is a primary state highway in the U.S. state of Virginia. The state highway runs 15.43 miles (24.83 km) from SR 166 in Chesapeake east and north to SR 225 in Virginia Beach. SR 190 is a J-shaped route that connects the central part of Chesapeake with the western part of Virginia Beach.

== Route description ==
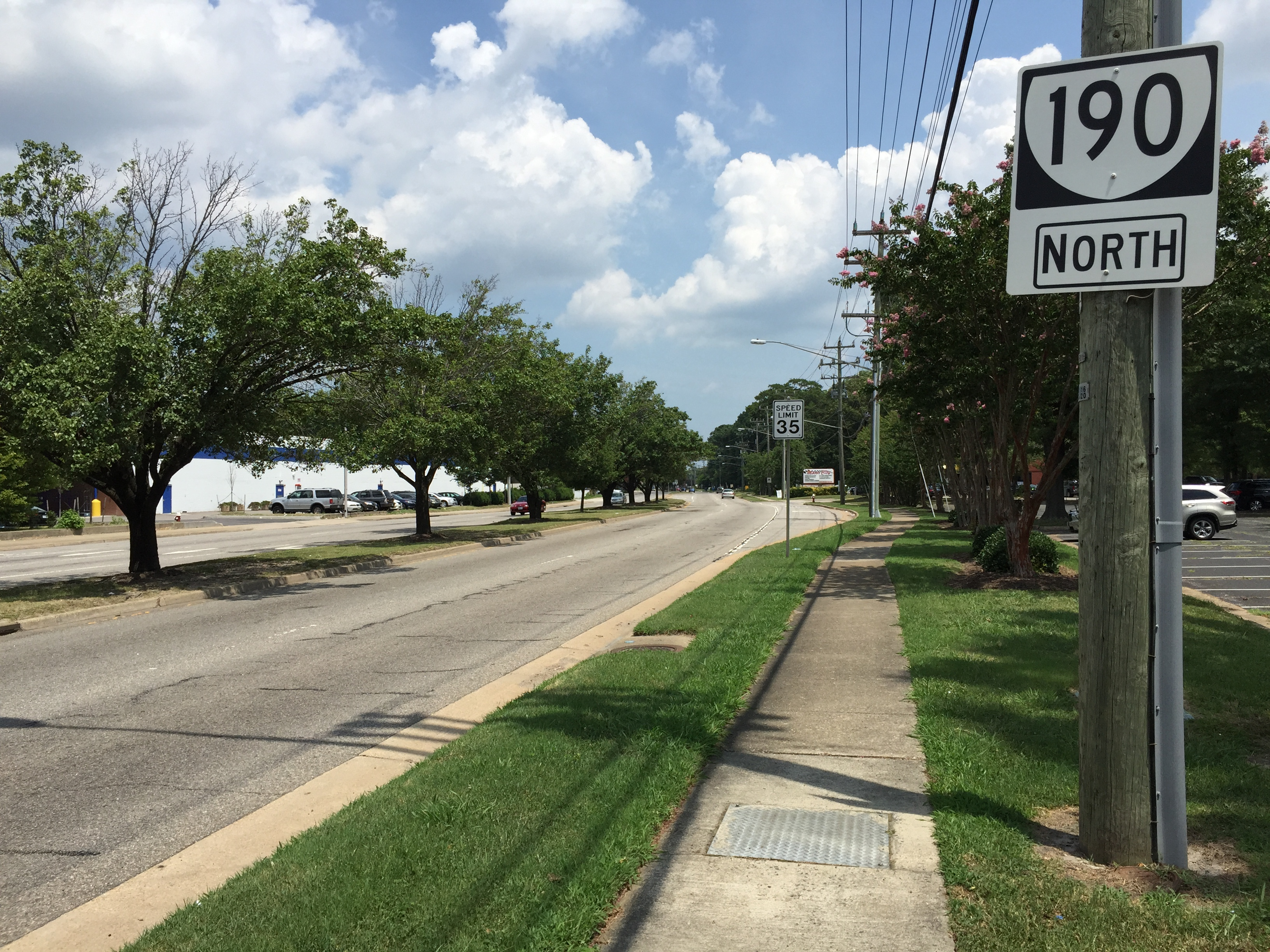
View north along SR 190 at US 58 in Virginia Beach

SR 190 begins at an intersection with SR 166 (Bainbridge Boulevard) in the Crestwood section of the independent city of Chesapeake. The state highway heads southeast as two-lane undivided Great Bridge Boulevard. SR 190 crosses over Interstate 64 (I-64) (Hampton Roads Beltway) and receives an exit ramp from I-64 heading east; this ramp is used to connect that direction of I-64 with U.S. Route 17 (US 17) (Dominion Boulevard), which the state highway intersects a short distance to the southeast. Access to I-64, I-464, and SR 168 is provided via US 17 just to the east of the SR 190–US 17 junction. SR 190 continues southeast to the Oak Grove section of Chesapeake. Just west of SR 168 Business (Battlefield Boulevard), the state highway receives an exit ramp from southbound SR 168 (Oak Grove Connector). Full access to the freeway is provided by heading north on SR 168 Business.

SR 190 continues northeast as Kempsville Road, a six-lane divided highway. The state highway passes under SR 168 (Great Bridge Bypass) and receives an exit ramp from northbound SR 168. SR 190 has a grade crossing of the Chesapeake and Albemarle Railroad just south of its intersection with Greenbrier Parkway and Butts Station Road. The state highway enters the city of Virginia Beach north of Volvo Parkway and becomes four lanes at Centerville Turnpike. SR 190 continues north through a densely populated suburban area and intersects Indian River Road and Providence Road before intersecting SR 165 (Princess Anne Road) in the Kempsville area of Virginia Beach. The state highway continues north as Witchduck Road, which is an undivided highway between SR 165 and the highway's partial cloverleaf interchange with I-264 (Virginia Beach Expressway). SR 190 intersects US 58 (Virginia Beach Boulevard) and begins to curve east as it bypasses the Pembroke Manor area of Virginia Beach to the northwest. The state highway's name changes to Pembroke Boulevard shortly before reaching its northern terminus at SR 225 (Independence Boulevard).

== Major intersections ==
County	Location	mi	km	Destinations	Notes
City of Chesapeake		0.00	0.00	SR 166 (Bainbridge Boulevard)	Western terminus
City of Chesapeake		1.39	2.24	US 17 (Martin Luther King Jr. Highway / Dominion Boulevard) to I-464 north / US 13 – Chesapeake Regional Airport, Tidewater Community College Chesapeake Campus	short overlap with US 17 south (eastbound only)
City of Chesapeake		3.73	6.00	SR 168 Bus. (Battlefield Boulevard)	
City of Virginia Beach				Indian River Road	former SR 407 west
City of Virginia Beach				Providence Road	former SR 409 west
City of Virginia Beach		12.11	19.49	SR 165 (Princess Anne Road)	
City of Virginia Beach		12.83	20.65	I-264 – Norfolk, Ocean Front	Exit 16 (I-264)
City of Virginia Beach		13.43	21.61	US 58 (Virginia Beach Boulevard)	
City of Virginia Beach		15.43	24.83	SR 225 (Independence Boulevard)	Northern terminus
1.000 mi = 1.609 km; 1.000 km = 0.621 mi: Concurrency terminus
