= Virginia State Route 165 =

State highway in southeastern Virginia, US

State Route 165

Route information
- Maintained by VDOT
- Length: 39.75 mi (63.97 km)
- Existed: 1933–present

Major junctions
- South end: US 17 Bus. in Chesapeake
- US 17 in Chesapeake; SR 168 in Chesapeake; US 58 in Norfolk; US 13 / SR 166 in Norfolk; I-64 in Norfolk; US 460 in Norfolk
- North end: SR 337 in Norfolk

Location
- Country: United States
- State: Virginia
- Counties: City of Chesapeake, City of Virginia Beach, City of Norfolk

Highway system
- Virginia Routes; Interstate; US; Primary; Secondary; Byways; History; HOT lanes
← SR 164	→ SR 166

State Route 165 (SR 165) is a primary state highway in the U.S. state of Virginia. The state highway runs 39.75 miles (63.97 km) from U.S. Route 17 Business (US 17 Business) in Chesapeake north to SR 337 in Norfolk. SR 165 is a C-shaped route that connects Chesapeake and Norfolk in the Hampton Roads metropolitan area indirectly via Virginia Beach. The highway's east–west segment connects the Chesapeake communities of Deep Creek and Great Bridge with the Princess Anne part of Virginia Beach. SR 165's northwest–southeast portion connects the Princess Anne area with Virginia Beach's Salem and Kempsville communities and with Norfolk. Within Norfolk, the state highway parallels Interstate 64 (I-64) while passing through the eastern and northern areas of the city near Norfolk International Airport and Naval Station Norfolk. Much of SR 165 is a multi-lane divided highway, but there are significant two-lane stretches in all three of the independent cities the highway serves.

== Route description ==
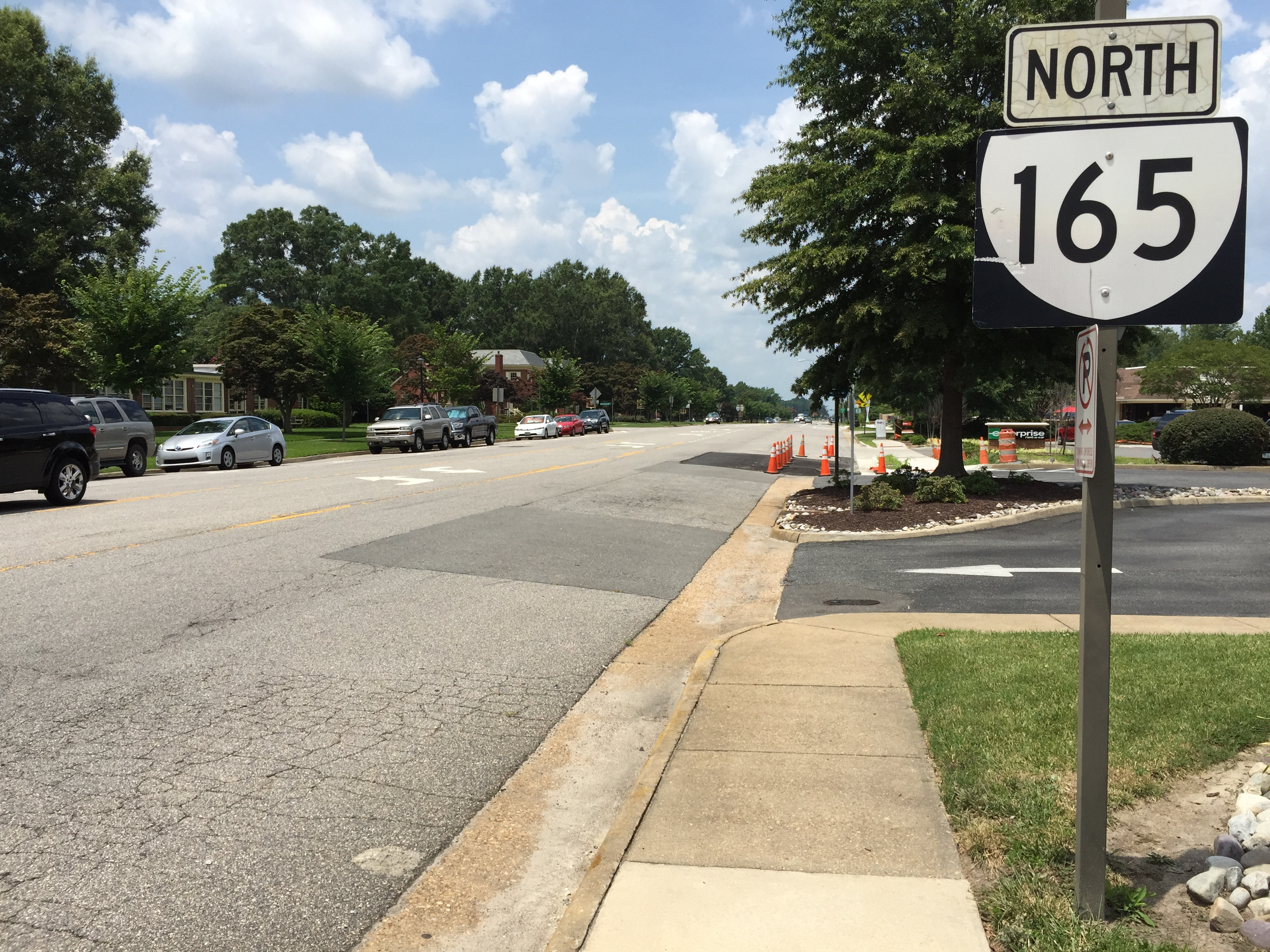
View north along SR 165 near SR 149 in Virginia Beach

=== Chesapeake and Virginia Beach ===
SR 165 begins at an intersection with US 17 Business (George Washington Highway) next to the business route's crossing of the Dismal Swamp Canal in the Deep Creek section of the independent city of Chesapeake. The state highway heads east as Moses Grandy Trail, which begins as a two-lane undivided road but expands to a four-lane divided highway one block east of US 17 Business. SR 165 heads east through a forested area and crosses New Mill Creek before intersecting the eastern end of its old alignment, Cedar Road. The state highway's name changes to Cedar Road at its intersection with US 17 (Dominion Boulevard). SR 165 continues east through a densely populated suburban area toward the Great Bridge area of Chesapeake. Just west of the Chesapeake municipal complex, the state highway reduces to three lanes—two lanes heading east and one lane toward the west—for the last segment of the highway east to SR 168 Business (Battlefield Boulevard), a five-lane road with center turn lane.

After a short concurrency with SR 168 Business, SR 165 turns east onto Mt. Pleasant Road, which is a four-lane divided highway until just east of its partial cloverleaf interchange with SR 168 (Great Bridge Bypass). The state highway reduces to two lanes and crosses a creek and has a grade crossing of the Chesapeake and Albemarle Railroad. East of Centerville Turnpike, SR 165 enters a rural area in which it passes to the north of Naval Auxiliary Landing Field Fentress. The state highway curves north through a swamp, within which the highway enters the city of Virginia Beach by crossing the Chesapeake and Albemarle Canal at its eastern end at the North Landing River. SR 165 heads northeast through farmland to the Virginia Beach municipal center in the Princess Anne area of Virginia Beach, within which the highway meets the western end of SR 149 (Princess Anne Road), which heads northeast toward the Virginia Beach Oceanfront.

SR 165 continues northwest on two-lane Princess Anne Road through a rural area. The state highway enters a suburban area with scattered farmland and expands to an eight-lane divided highway just east of Dam Neck Road, which leads to the Virginia Beach Sportsplex and Veterans United Home Loans Amphitheater. SR 165 continues past the Virginia Beach campus of Tidewater Community College and passes through the Salem area of the city, where the highway intersects Independence Boulevard and Lynnhaven Parkway. A short distance west of Lynnhaven Parkway, two lanes in each direction split off to the west as Ferrell Parkway at a partial interchange; the missing movements are made via Salem Road. SR 165 continues northwest as a four-lane divided highway to the Kempsville are of Virginia Beach. There, the state highway intersects SR 190, which heads south as Kempsville Road and north as Witchduck Road.

=== Norfolk ===
SR 165 crosses the upper reaches of the Eastern Branch Elizabeth River before entering the city of Norfolk at its intersection with SR 403 (Newtown Road), which connects SR 165 with I-64 (Hampton Roads Beltway) and I-264 (Virginia Beach Expressway) and provides access to the Newtown Road station of Hampton Roads Transit's Tide Light Rail. The state highway continues north as Kempsville Road, which passes under I-264 just east of its interchange with I-64. SR 165 reduces to two lanes between its intersection with US 58 (Virginia Beach Boulevard) and its underpass of I-64. SR 165 crosses Lake Taylor and turns west onto six-lane Northampton Boulevard for a brief concurrency with US 13 and SR 166. At the next intersection with Military Highway, SR 166 continues west as Princess Anne Road toward Downtown Norfolk, US 13 turns south onto Military Highway toward Chesapeake, and SR 165 turns north onto Military Highway toward Naval Station Norfolk.

SR 165 has a grade crossing of a rail line just south of another underpass of I-64 and intersection with Robin Hood Road, where the highway becomes a five-lane road with a center left-turn lane. Robin Hood Road is used for ramps with westbound I-64; there is also a direct ramp from eastbound I-64 to southbound SR 165 and a ramp from eastbound I-64 to Robin Hood Road. Robin Hood Road and the next two major streets SR 165 intersects, SR 192 (Azalea Garden Road) and SR 247 (Norview Avenue), are used to reach Norfolk International Airport to the east. North of the airport area, SR 165 follows Military Highway to its conclusion at SR 170 (Little Creek Road). SR 170 heads east toward Naval Amphibious Base Little Creek; SR 165 turns west onto Little Creek Road, another five-lane road. Just to the west, the state highway intersects SR 194 (Chesapeake Boulevard).

SR 165 becomes a divided highway again at Sewells Point Road, just east of its single-point urban interchange with SR 168 (Tidewater Drive). In the Wards Corner area of Norfolk, the state highway has a partial interchange with I-64 that allows access to points to and from the direction of Virginia Beach. SR 165 becomes a four-lane undivided highway at its grade crossing of Norfolk Southern Railway's rail line to Sewell's Point. West of the rail crossing, the state highway intersects US 460 (Granby Street), which to the north provides access to westbound I-64 and I-564 (Admiral Taussig Boulevard), the main highway onto Naval Station Norfolk. SR 165 continues west through a densely populated residential area to its northern terminus at SR 337 (Hampton Boulevard) south of Naval Station Norfolk and Norfolk International Terminal.

== Major intersections ==
County	Location	mi	km	Destinations	Notes
City of Chesapeake	Deep Creek	0.00	0.00	US 17 Bus. (George Washington Highway)	Southern terminus
City of Chesapeake	Herberts Corner	2.70	4.35	US 17 (Dominion Boulevard) – Chesapeake Regional Airport	
City of Chesapeake	Great Bridge	6.72	10.81	SR 168 Bus. north (South Battlefield Boulevard)	South end of concurrency with SR 168 Business
City of Chesapeake	Great Bridge	6.98	11.23	SR 168 Bus. south (South Battlefield Boulevard)	North end of concurrency with SR 168 Business
City of Chesapeake	Great Bridge	7.73	12.44	SR 168 – Virginia Beach, Suffolk, Nags Head	Exit 11 (SR 168)
City of Chesapeake				Fentress Airfield Road	former SR 190 south
City of Chesapeake	North Landing			North Landing Bridge over Albemarle and Chesapeake Canal (Atlantic Intracoastal Waterway)	
City of Virginia Beach	Princess Anne	19.87	31.98	SR 149 east (Princess Anne Road)	
City of Virginia Beach	Gallops Corner			Ferrell Parkway	interchange; northbound exit and southbound entrance
City of Virginia Beach	Kempsville	27.84	44.80	SR 190 (Kempsville Road / South Witchduck Road)	
City of Norfolk	Greenwich	29.77	47.91	North Newtown Road (SR 403 north) to I-264 / I-64	
City of Norfolk	Glen Rock	30.77	49.52	US 58 (Virginia Beach Boulevard)	
City of Norfolk	Lansdale	32.34	52.05	US 13 north / SR 166 north (Northampton Boulevard) to I-64 east – Virginia Beach, Chesapeake Bay Bridge-Tunnel	South end of concurrency with US 13 and SR 166
City of Norfolk	Lansdale	32.60	52.46	US 13 south (North Military Highway) / SR 166 south (East Princess Anne Road) – Downtown Norfolk	North end of concurrency with US 13 and SR 166
City of Norfolk	Lansdale	33.22	53.46	I-64 west / Robin Hood Road – Richmond	I-64 exit 281; former SR 192 north
City of Norfolk	Azalea Acres	33.82	54.43	SR 192 north (Azalea Garden Road)	
City of Norfolk	Bromley	34.21	55.06	SR 247 west (Norview Avenue) to I-64 – Botanical Garden, Airport	
City of Norfolk	Oakwood	35.86	57.71	SR 170 east (East Little Creek Road) to US 60 – Little Creek	
City of Norfolk	Oakwood	35.98	57.90	SR 194 (Chesapeake Boulevard) to I-64 east	
City of Norfolk	Oakwood	36.56	58.84	SR 168 (Tidewater Drive)	interchange
City of Norfolk	Denby Park	37.42	60.22	I-64 east / Tidewater Drive	I-64 exit 276
City of Norfolk	Denby Park			Taussig Boulevard to I-64 / I-564	former SR 170 west
City of Norfolk	Wards Corner	37.78	60.80	US 460 (Granby Street) to I-564 – Virginia Zoo, Naval Station Norfolk, Downtown Norfolk, TCC	
City of Norfolk	Meadowbrook	39.75	63.97	SR 337 (Hampton Boulevard)	Northern terminus
1.000 mi = 1.609 km; 1.000 km = 0.621 mi: Concurrency terminus; Incomplete access

< SR 1011	Spurs of SR 10; 1923–1928	none
< SR 501	District 5 State Routes; 1928–1933	SR 503 >
