= Virginia State Route 166 =

State highway in southeastern Virginia, US

State Route 166

Route information
- Maintained by cities of Chesapeake, Norfolk, and Virginia Beach
- Length: 15.47 mi (24.90 km)
- Existed: 1933–present

Major junctions
- South end: US 17 in Chesapeake
- US 13 / US 460 in Chesapeake; I-264 in Norfolk; US 460 / SR 168 in Norfolk; US 58 in Norfolk; I-64 in Norfolk; US 13 in Virginia Beach
- North end: US 60 in Virginia Beach

Location
- Country: United States
- State: Virginia
- Counties: City of Chesapeake, City of Norfolk, City of Virginia Beach

Highway system
- Virginia Routes; Interstate; US; Primary; Secondary; Byways; History; HOT lanes
← SR 165	→ SR 167

State Route 166 (SR 166) is a primary state highway in the U.S. state of Virginia. The state highway runs 15.47 miles (24.90 km) from U.S. Route 17 (US 17) in Chesapeake north to US 60 in Virginia Beach.

== Route description ==
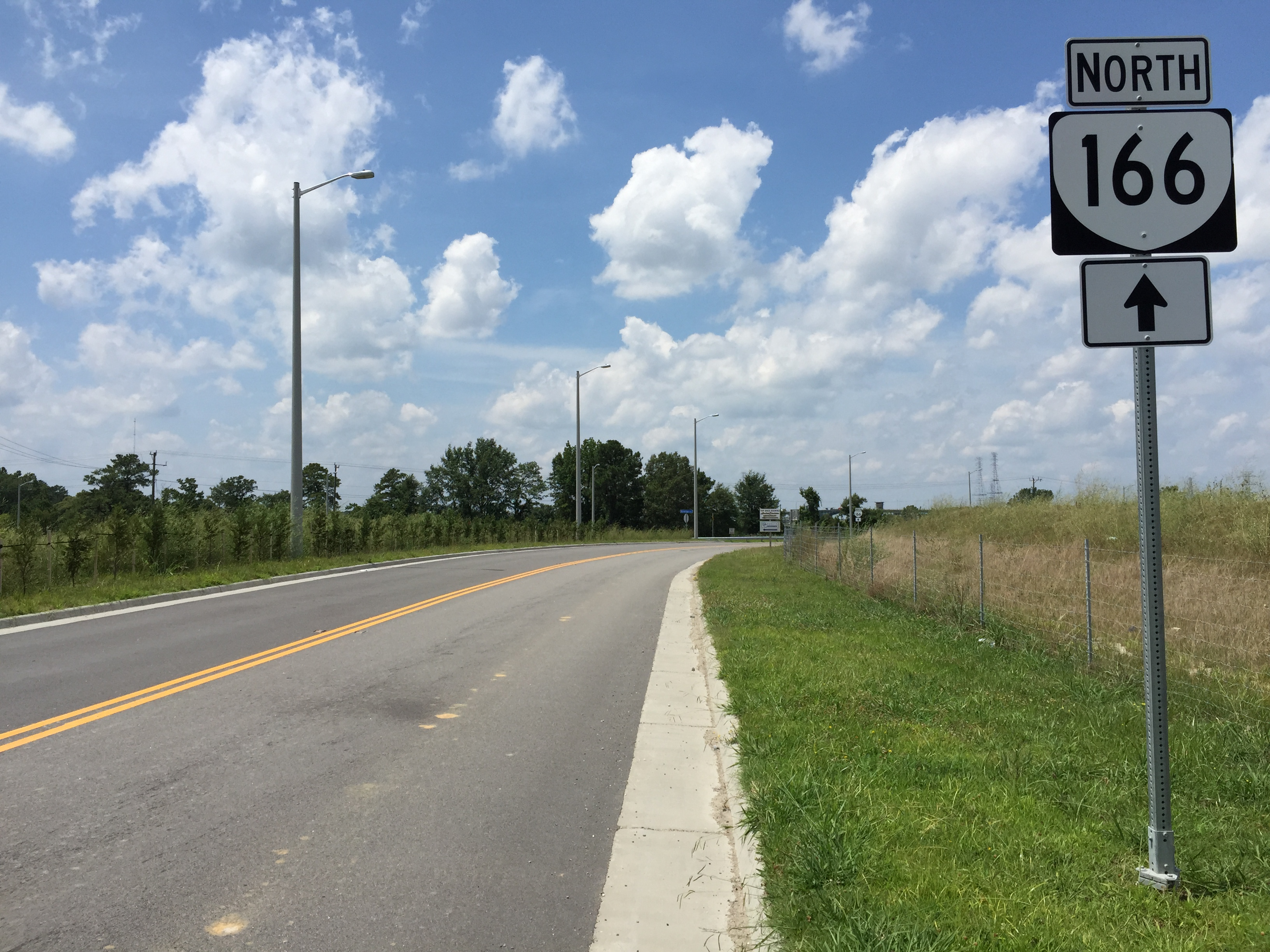
View north at the south end of SR 166 at US 17 in Chesapeake

SR 166 begins at an intersection with US 17 (Dominion Boulevard) just north of the Veterans Bridge (Chesapeake, Virginia) over the Southern Branch Elizabeth River in the independent city of Chesapeake. The state highway heads north as Bainbridge Boulevard, a two-lane undivided road that parallels the river through an industrial area. SR 166 passes under Interstate 64 (I-64) with no access, meets the western end of SR 190 (Great Bridge Boulevard), and crosses Newton Creek. The state highway has a partial cloverleaf interchange with US 13 and US 460 (Military Highway); within the interchange, SR 166 descends to pass under Military Highway and Norfolk Southern Railway's Norfolk District. SR 166 heads north concurrent with US 460. The highways pass under I-464 and cross Milldam Creek, and continues north as a four-lane undivided highway into the South Norfolk area of Chesapeake.

SR 166 and US 460 pass under another Norfolk Southern rail line and meet SR 337 at the junction of Bainbridge Boulevard and Poindexter Street. SR 337 heads north on Bainbridge Boulevard and west on Poindexter Street toward an interchange with I-464 and the Jordan Bridge across the Southern Branch Elizabeth River to Portsmouth; SR 166 and US 460 head northeast on two-lane Poindexter Avenue. At SR 246 (Liberty Street), the two highways turn west for one block before continuing northeast on four-lane 22nd Street, which crosses over the Norfolk District rail line and another rail line. SR 166 and US 460 veer onto two-lane Wilson Road at Berkley Street, where the road enters the city of Norfolk. SR 166 and US 460 expand to a four-lane divided highway just south of Indian River Road, north of which the highways meet SR 168 (Campostella Road) at an acute intersection that does not allow access from northbound SR 168 to southbound SR 166.

SR 166, US 460, and SR 168 head north as a six-lane divided highway across the Eastern Branch Elizabeth River on the Campostella Bridge. The boulevard's name changes from Campostella Road to Brambleton Avenue at its partial cloverleaf interchange with I-264. There is no access from eastbound I-264 to northbound SR 166 or to westbound I-264 from either direction of SR 166. Just north of the interchange, the three highways pass under Hampton Roads Transit's Tide Light Rail next to the NSU station and SR 166 turns northeast onto Park Avenue while US 460 and SR 168 continue northwest toward Downtown Norfolk. SR 166 follows the four-lane divided street along the western edge of the Norfolk State University campus and intersects US 58 (Virginia Beach Boulevard) before turning onto four-lane undivided Princess Anne Road, which heads west as SR 404. SR 168 has a grade crossing of Norfolk Southern's rail line to Sewell's Point and expands to a divided highway as it passes along the northern edge of an industrial area, where the highway meets the southern end of SR 194 (Sewells Point Road).

SR 166 follows Princess Anne Road to its eastern end at Military Highway, which is US 13 heading south and SR 165 heading north. The three highways continue east on six-lane Northampton Boulevard. At the next intersection, SR 165 splits south onto Kempsville Road. SR 166 and US 13 continue east across Lake Wright and meet I-64 (Hampton Roads Beltway) at a partial cloverleaf interchange. The interchange includes a flyover ramp from southbound SR 166 to eastbound I-64 but does not include ramps from northbound SR 166 to westbound I-64 or from eastbound I-64 to southbound SR 166; those movements are made via Military Highway to the north. SR 166 and US 13 enter the city of Virginia Beach at Wesleyan Drive, which leads south to Virginia Wesleyan College. SR 166 diverges from US 13, which continues to the Chesapeake Bay Bridge-Tunnel, onto Diamond Springs Road. The state highway follows that four-lane divided highway north between an industrial area and a residential area to its northern terminus at US 60 (Shore Drive) adjacent to Naval Amphibious Base Little Creek.

== Major intersections ==
County	Location	mi	km	Destinations	Notes
City of Chesapeake		0.00	0.00	US 17 (Dominion Boulevard)	Southern terminus
City of Chesapeake		2.05	3.30	SR 190 east (Great Bridge Boulevard) – Great Bridge	
City of Chesapeake		2.74	4.41	US 13 / US 460 west to I-64 – Suffolk, Virginia Beach	interchange; south end of concurrency with US 460
City of Chesapeake		5.54	8.92	SR 337 (Poindexter Street / Bainbridge Boulevard)	south end of SR 337 Alt. overlap
City of Chesapeake		6.10	9.82	SR 246 east (Liberty Street)	
City of Norfolk				SR 407 (Indian River Road)	
City of Norfolk		7.14	11.49	SR 168 south (Campostella Road)	South end of concurrency with SR 168
City of Norfolk				Campostella Bridge over Eastern Branch Elizabeth River	
City of Norfolk		7.87	12.67	I-264 east to I-64 / Chesapeake Bay Bridge-Tunnel – Virginia Beach, Airport	I-264 exit 11
City of Norfolk		8.17	13.15	US 460 east / SR 168 north (Brambleton Avenue / SR 337 Alt. north)	north end of US 460 / SR 168 / SR 337 Alt. overlap
City of Norfolk		8.62	13.87	US 58 (Virginia Beach Boulevard) – Downtown Norfolk, Virginia Zoo	
City of Norfolk		8.76	14.10	East Princess Anne Road (SR 404 west)	
City of Norfolk				SR 194 north (Sewell's Point Road)	
City of Norfolk		12.12	19.51	US 13 south / SR 165 north (North Military Highway) to I-64 – Airport, Botanical Garden	South end of concurrencies with US 13 and SR 165
City of Norfolk		12.38	19.92	SR 165 south (Kempsville Road)	North end of concurrency with SR 165
City of Norfolk		13.00	20.92	I-64 (Hampton Roads Beltway) – Hampton, Richmond, Downtown Norfolk, Chesapeake, Suffolk	I-64 exit 282; no access from SR 166 north to I-64 west or I-64 east to SR 166 south
City of Virginia Beach		14.15	22.77	US 13 north (Northampton Boulevard) – Chesapeake Bay Bridge-Tunnel	North end of concurrency with US 13
City of Virginia Beach		15.47	24.90	US 60 (Shore Drive)	Northern terminus
1.000 mi = 1.609 km; 1.000 km = 0.621 mi: Concurrency terminus; Incomplete access

< SR 503	District 5 State Routes; 1928–1933	SR 505 >
