= Virginia Beach Convention Center =

Coordinates: 36.846252°N 75.987272°W

- Interactive map of Virginia Beach Convention Center
- Address: 1000 19th Street, Virginia Beach, VA 23451
- Location: Virginia Beach, Virginia
- Owner: City of Virginia Beach
- Operator: Virginia Beach Convention and Visitors Bureau

Construction
- Opened: July 2005 (Phase One) January 2007 (Phase Two)
- Cost: $207 million
- Architects: Skidmore, Owings and Merrill

Website
- https://www.visitvirginiabeach.com/conventioncenter/

The Virginia Beach Convention Center is a large convention center located in Virginia Beach, Virginia. It opened in 2005, and is the largest building in the city of Virginia Beach by its total site area.

== Location ==
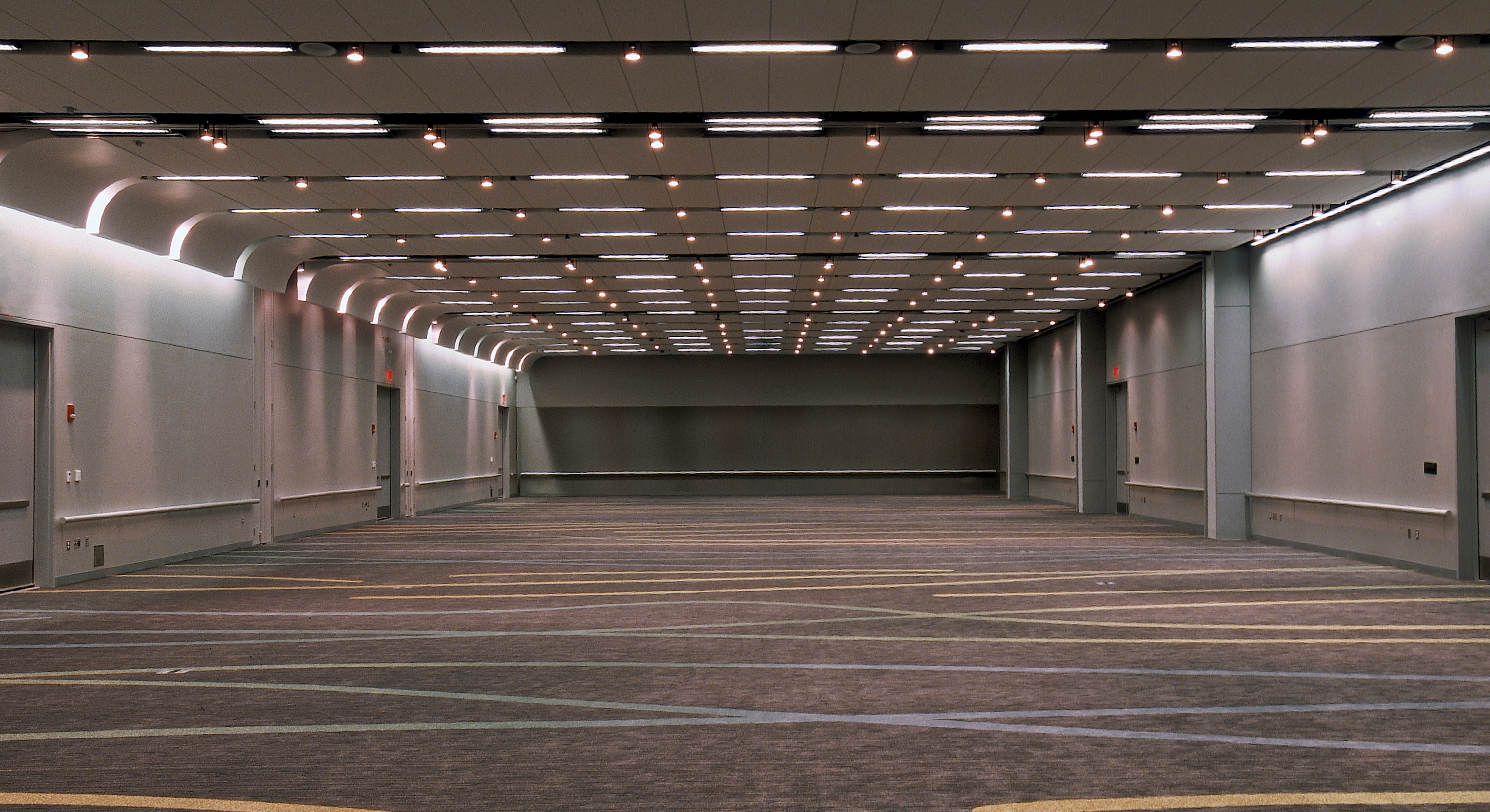
Conference rooms inside the convention center featuring retractable walls to divide the single room into three

The Virginia Beach Convention Center is located at 1000 19th Street in Virginia Beach, just off the Virginia Beach Expressway and across the street from the Virginia Beach Sports Center. The Convention Center is part of the Vibe Creation District near the Virginia Beach Oceanfront.

== Facilities ==
It has over 529,000 square feet of exhibit space and its exhibit hall can seat up to 11,840 people with theater seating. It has over 31,029 square feet of ballroom space, spread across three rooms, which can seat up to 2,000 people with banquet seating and 3,108 with theater seating. In addition to the ballrooms, the convention center also has 26 meeting rooms with 28,929 square feet of meeting space between its two stories. The convention center also has a large 150-foot tower on its east side that has four floors with a large board room, VIP lounge, coffee bar and observation deck. Outside, the building features reflecting pools and a "front porch" that provides a shaded outdoor space.

== Construction and awards ==
The convention center was designed by Skidmore, Owings & Merrill LLP and built by Turner Construction Company, with a construction cost of $207 million. Construction first began in the early 2000s, and was built in two stages. Stage 1 was completed in July 2005, and Phase 2 was completed in January 2007.

The convention center has won many awards including:

- Innovative Design in Engineering and Architecture with Structural Steel National Award from the American Institute of Steel Construction (2008)
- Virginia Green Certification from the Virginia Department of Environmental Quality (2007)
- Prime Site Award from Facilities & Destinations Magazine (2007)
- Public Works Project of the Year Award from the American Public Works Association (2008)
- Virginia Beach Planning Commission Honor Award, Exceptional Public Facility (2005)
- Best Institutional Public Building: First Honor Award from the Hampton Roads Association for Commercial Real Estate (2006)
- LEED Gold Certification (2010)

== Events ==
All of Virginia Beach's high schools under Virginia Beach City Public Schools have held their graduations each year at the Virginia Beach Convention Center since 2008, with the exception of the 2020 class due to covid restrictions. Related to this, academy information nights for rising high schoolers are held in the convention center each November, with booths for each high school and special program.

Then-presidential candidate Barack Obama held a 2008 campaign rally titled "Stand for Change" at the convention center.

== See also ==
- List of convention centers in the United States
- List of convention and exhibition centers
- Virginia Beach, Virginia
