= Interstate 264 (Virginia) =

Interstate Highway in southeastern Virginia, US

Interstate 264
- I-264 highlighted in red

Route information
- Auxiliary route of I-64
- Maintained by VDOT
- Length: 25.07 mi (40.35 km)
- Existed: 1960–present
- NHS: Entire route

Major junctions
- West end: I-64 / I-664 in Chesapeake
- US 17 in Portsmouth; I-464 in Norfolk; US 460 in Norfolk; US 13 in Norfolk; I-64 in Norfolk; US 58 in Virginia Beach
- East end: Parks Avenue / 21st & 22nd Streets in Virginia Beach

Location
- Country: United States
- State: Virginia
- Counties: City of Chesapeake, City of Portsmouth, City of Norfolk, City of Virginia Beach

Highway system
- Interstate Highway System; Main; Auxiliary; Suffixed; Business; Future; Virginia Routes; Interstate; US; Primary; Secondary; Byways; History; HOT lanes
← SR 263	→ SR 267

Interstate 264 (I-264) is an Interstate Highway in the US state of Virginia. It serves as the primary east–west highway through the South Hampton Roads region in southeastern Virginia. The route connects the central business districts of Chesapeake, Portsmouth, Norfolk, and Virginia Beach and serves as the most direct link between those cities and the resort beaches along Virginia's Atlantic coast.

It runs from a junction with I-64 and I-664 (Hampton Roads Beltway) near Bower's Hill in Chesapeake east into Portsmouth and through the Downtown Tunnel under the Southern Branch Elizabeth River into Norfolk. At the I-464 interchange in the Berkley section of Norfolk, I-264 turns north, crossing the Eastern Branch Elizabeth River into Downtown Norfolk on the Berkley Bridge, one of a small number of drawbridges on the Interstate Highway System. I-264 then heads east through Norfolk, crossing I-64 at the east side of the Hampton Roads Beltway and into Virginia Beach, where it ends at Parks Avenue just short of the Atlantic Ocean. From this point, 21st and 22nd streets continue as a oneway pair with no route designation to U.S. Route 60 (US 60, Pacific Avenue).

The original section of I-264, designated in the late 1950s, lies between the two I-64 junctions. The piece east to the Virginia Beach waterfront was built as the Virginia Beach–Norfolk Expressway (a toll road until 1995) and carried State Route 44 (SR 44) until I-264 was extended over it in 1999.

When I-64 was augmented in the 1990s with reversible HOV lanes, I-264 toward Virginia Beach (then SR 44) was designated as the eastern terminus of the reversible lanes and one of the few direct exits from/entrances to the HOV lanes.

I-264 is a part of the National Highway System for its entire length. A toll for use of the Downtown Tunnel began 2014, with tolls collected electronically.

== Route description ==
Timelapse video of an eastbound trip on I-264

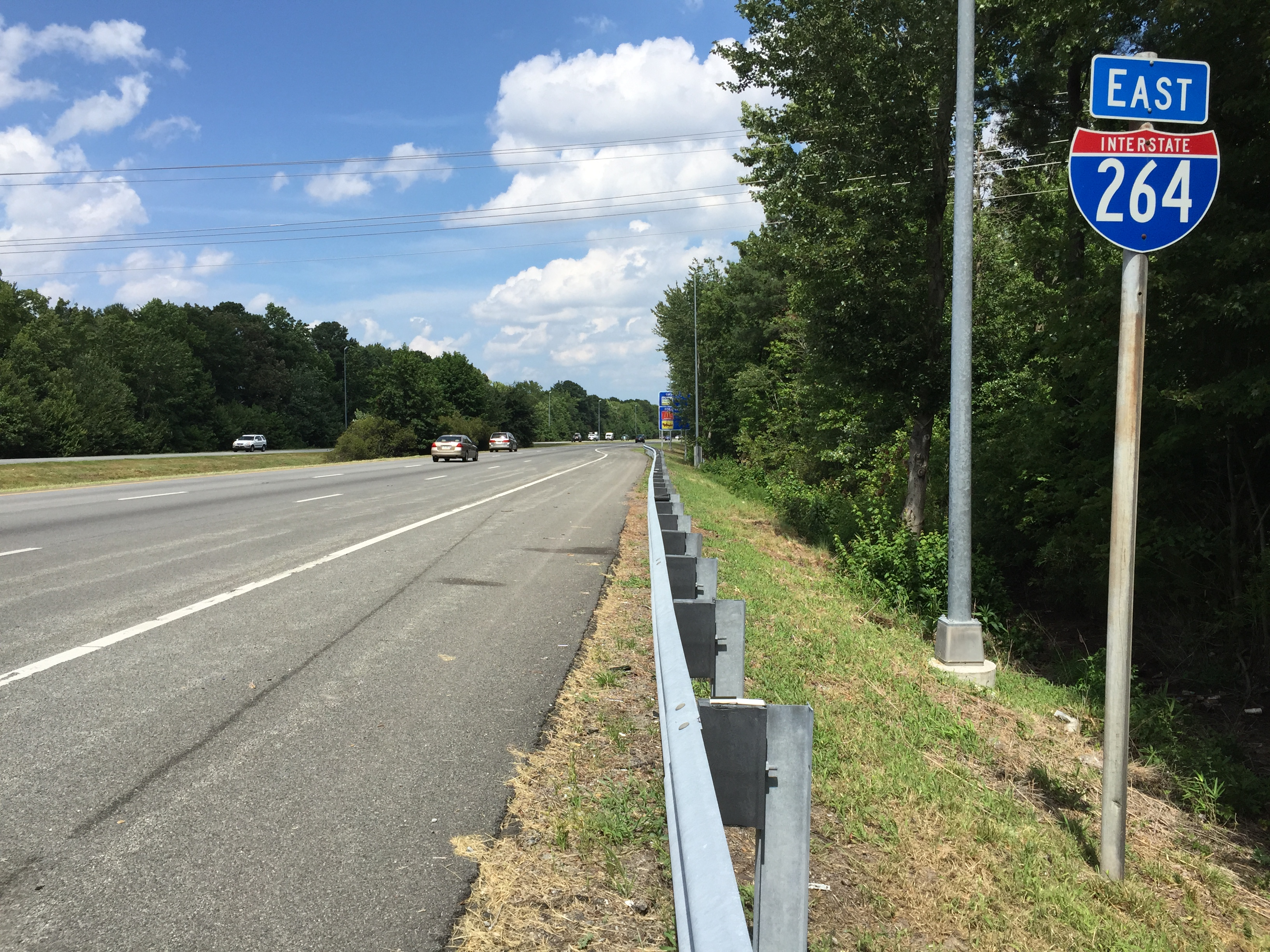
View east along I-264 east of the Greenwood Drive interchange in Portsmouth

I-264 begins at a full Y interchange in the Bower's Hill area of the city of Chesapeake. This interchange also serves as the eastern terminus of I-64 and the southern terminus of I-664, which together comprise the Hampton Roads Beltway. I-664 is used to access US 13, US 58, and US 460, which all head west toward Suffolk. I-264 heads northeast as a four-lane freeway into the city of Portsmouth, where the highway meets Greenwood Drive at a cloverleaf interchange and SR 239 (Victory Boulevard) at a diamond interchange where the Interstate expands to six lanes. The Interstate Highway begins an unsigned concurrency with U.S. Route 460 Alternate (US 460 Alt.) at a partial interchange with SR 337 (Portsmouth Boulevard), which allows access between I-264 toward Chesapeake and SR 337 toward Norfolk and between SR 337 toward Chesapeake and I-264 toward Norfolk. I-264 continues east through a partial cloverleaf interchange with US 17 (Frederick Boulevard). A partial junction with Des Moines Avenue allowed access to and from the west, but, since November 2013, access to Des Moines Avenue has been permanently closed for construction of the Martin Luther King Freeway interchange. (As of January 2014, traffic can still reach westbound I-264 from this junction, but that is expected to close later in the year.)

I-264's final interchange in Portsmouth provides access to SR 141 (Effingham Street) in downtown Portsmouth; westbound I-264 traffic has ramps to and from Bart Street. This interchange, which also serves the Norfolk Naval Shipyard, is where the Interstate reduces to four lanes and descends into the Downtown Tunnel under the Southern Branch Elizabeth River. I-264 surfaces in the city of Norfolk and immediately has an interchange with I-464, which heads south toward Chesapeake. The I-464 interchange also provides access to Berkley Avenue in the Berkley section of Norfolk. I-264 curves north as an eight-lane highway that crosses the Eastern Branch Elizabeth River on a drawbridge. At the north end of the drawbridge, the two directions of the Interstate temporarily split and have a series of ramps to Waterside Drive, St. Paul's Boulevard, City Hall Avenue, and Tidewater Drive at the eastern end of Downtown Norfolk. These streets provide access to Harbor Park, a baseball stadium that is home to the Norfolk Tides, and the Norfolk station for Amtrak service to routes along the northern I-95 corridor.

I-264 continues east as an eight-lane freeway between the Eastern Branch Elizabeth River to the south and Hampton Roads Transit's Tide Light Rail tracks to the north. The Interstate has an interchange with US 460, SR 166, and SR 168, which head northwest toward Downtown Norfolk as Brambleton Avenue and south across the river as Campostella Road. There is no access between Brambleton Avenue and I-264 toward downtown. East of US 460, the freeway passes to the south of Norfolk State University and has a diamond interchange with SR 405 (Ballentine Boulevard). I-264 crosses Broad Creek and gains collector–distributor lanes for the next three, closely-spaced interchanges. These junctions include a cloverleaf interchange with US 13 (Military Highway), a cloverleaf interchange with several flyover ramps at I-64 (Hampton Roads Beltway), and a partial cloverleaf interchange with SR 403 (Newtown Road). The middle carriageway of I-64 headed north, which has two HOV lanes, merges with both directions of I-264 heading east. I-264 enters the city of Virginia Beach at the Newtown Road interchange.

I-264 continues east as the Virginia Beach Expressway, an eight-lane freeway where the innermost lane in each direction is an HOV lane. The first two interchanges in Virginia Beach, a partial cloverleaf junction with SR 190 (Witchduck Road) and a cloverleaf interchange with SR 225 (Independence Boulevard), serve the Pembroke Manor area, which is the central business district of the city. Independence Boulevard also leads southeast toward Mount Trashmore Park, a reused landfill that is visible from the freeway, and further on toward the Virginia Beach Amphitheater and eventually the city's government center at Princess Anne. I-264 next has a partial cloverleaf interchange with Rosemont Road and a cloverleaf interchange with Lynnhaven Parkway, which leads to the Lynnhaven Mall. The Interstate crosses London Bridge Creek, a tributary of the Lynnhaven River, ahead of a partial interchange with London Bridge Road (also providing access to Great Neck Road) and then a crossover interchange that connects the freeway toward Norfolk with US 58 (Laskin Road) and U.S. Route 58 Business (US 58 Bus., Virginia Beach Boulevard) toward the oceanfront. I-264's HOV lanes end and the highway reduces to six lanes ahead of the interchange with First Colonial Road north of Naval Air Station Oceana. The Interstate crosses Great Neck Creek and has its final interchange, a partial interchange with Bird Neck Road that provides an alternative route to the oceanfront, before approaching its eastern terminus at Parks Avenue just north of the Virginia Beach Convention Center. The carriageways continue east as a oneway pair, 21st Street eastbound and 22nd Street westbound, east to US 60 (Pacific Avenue) and Atlantic Avenue at the Virginia Beach Oceanfront.

== History ==
=== Original I-264 ===
Originally, in 1960, I-264 was planned as an Interstate Highway through Downtown Norfolk.

=== Virginia Beach Expressway ===
State Route 44
- Location: Norfolk-Virginia Beach
- Length: 12.19 mi (19.62 km)
- Existed: 1967–1999

The Virginia Beach Expressway (also known as the Virginia Beach–Norfolk Expressway) was a 12-mile (19 km) limited-access highway built to Interstate Highway standards extending between the independent cities of Norfolk and Virginia Beach, Virginia. Until 1999, it was signed as State Route 44 (SR 44).

Built and funded with toll revenue bonds, it opened on December 1, 1967, as SR 44. The expressway ran from an interchange with I-64 and I-264 in Norfolk almost due east to the oceanfront area of Virginia Beach. The original road had four lanes (two each way). It was widened to six lanes in the 1980s and to eight lanes in the early 1990s.

A two-tier toll structure existed, with lower tolls for those who passed the main toll barrier between Rosemont Road and Independence Boulevard. Technical errors were common; alarms installed to alert police of a nonpaying motorist would often be activated by the machine's failure to detect the insertion of the proper toll.

Vehicle type	Main toll barrier	Exit before/enter after barrier
Cars and other two-axle vehicles	$0.25	$0.10
Other vehicles	$0.25 + $0.10/axle over two	$0.05/axle

On June 1, 1995, the bonds were retired, and tolls and toll booths were removed in 1996. In July 1999, the former Virginia Beach Expressway was renumbered to I-264, effectively creating an eastward continuation of the original I-264, which ran through the downtown areas of Portsmouth and Norfolk and ended at I-64 (where the expressway began). This is now the point where I-264 intersects and crosses the I-64 portion of the Hampton Roads Beltway near Military Circle Mall in Norfolk.

== Exit list ==
County	Location	mi	km	Old exit	New exit	Destinations	Notes
City of Chesapeake		0.00	0.00			I-64 west (Hampton Roads Beltway) – Chesapeake, Virginia Beach I-664 north (Hampton Roads Beltway) to US 13 / US 58 / US 460 – Bowers Hill, Suffolk, Richmond	Western terminus; eastern terminus and exit 299A on I-64; southern terminus and exit 15A on I-664
City of Portsmouth		1.33	2.14		2	Greenwood Drive	Signed as exits 2A (east) and 2B (west)
City of Portsmouth		2.62	4.22		3	Victory Boulevard (SR 239)	
City of Portsmouth		3.56	5.73		4	SR 337 east (Portsmouth Boulevard)	Eastbound exit and westbound entrance
City of Portsmouth		3.56	5.73		4	SR 337 west (Portsmouth Boulevard / US 460 Alt. west)	Westbound exit and eastbound entrance; west end of US 460 Alt. overlap
City of Portsmouth		4.28	6.89		5	US 17 (Frederick Boulevard)	
City of Portsmouth					6	SR 164 (Martin Luther King Freeway) – Norfolk	
City of Portsmouth		5.27	8.48		6	Des Moines Avenue	Former eastbound exit and westbound entrance, closed April 14, 2014 to make way for new Midtown Tunnel interchange
City of Portsmouth		5.94	9.56		7	SR 141 (Effingham Street) / Crawford Street	Signed as exits 7A (south) and 7B (north) eastbound
City of Portsmouth		6.50	10.46	Toll gantry			
Southern Branch Elizabeth River		6.81	10.96	Downtown Tunnel			
City of Norfolk		7.36	11.84		8	I-464 south / Berkley Avenue (SR 337 south) – Chesapeake	West end of SR 337 overlap
City of Norfolk				Berkley Bridge over Eastern Branch Elizabeth River			
City of Norfolk		7.52	12.10		9	Waterside Drive (SR 337 Alt. east) / St. Paul's Boulevard (US 460 Alt. east)	East end of US 460 Alt. overlap
City of Norfolk		7.77	12.50		10	Tidewater Drive (SR 337 north)	Eastbound exit and westbound entrance; east end of SR 337 overlap
City of Norfolk		7.77	12.50		10	City Hall Avenue	No direct eastbound exit
City of Norfolk		8.68	13.97		11A	US 460 west / SR 166 west / SR 168 south (Campostella Road) / Claiborne Avenue	Signed as exit 11 eastbound; no westbound entrance
City of Norfolk		8.68	13.97		11B	US 460 east / SR 166 east / SR 168 north (Brambleton Avenue)	Westbound exit and eastbound entrance
City of Norfolk		9.49	15.27		12	Ballentine Boulevard (SR 405)	
City of Norfolk					13	US 13 (Military Highway)	Signed as exits 13A (south) and 13B (north)
City of Norfolk		12.88	20.73		14	I-64 (Hampton Roads Beltway) to I-664 north – Hampton, Richmond, Chesapeake, Suffolk, Norfolk International Airport	Signed as exits 14A (east), 14B (west), and 14C (left exits I-264 east to I-64 west and I-264 west to I-64 east)
City of Virginia Beach		13.62	21.92	1	15	Newtown Road (SR 403)	Signed as exit 15A (north/south) eastbound, upon completion of replacement exit 15B, will be resigned southbound-only/Greenwich Rd.
City of Virginia Beach					15B	Newtown Road (SR 403) north	Closed; former eastbound exit, closed July 15, 2018 to make way for improvements to exit 14 and Newtown Rd/Greenwich Rd intersection, including a roundabout that includes eastbound onramp Exit currently being rebuilt; once complete, eastbound exit 15A will become southbound-only/Greenwich Rd.
City of Virginia Beach		15.02	24.17	2	16	Witchduck Road (SR 190)	Eastbound exit being redesigned from parclo to diamond interchange
City of Virginia Beach		16.3	26.2	3	17	Independence Boulevard (SR 225 north) - Pembroke Area, Princess Anne	Signed as exits 17A (south) and 17B (north); former SR 410 south
City of Virginia Beach		18.64	30.00	4	18	Rosemont Road	Former SR 411
City of Virginia Beach		20.48	32.96	5	19	Lynnhaven Parkway	Signed as exits 19A (south) and 19B (north); former SR 414 south
City of Virginia Beach					19C	London Bridge Road	Eastbound exit and westbound entrance; to SR 279
City of Virginia Beach		21.65	34.84	6	20	US 58 east (Laskin Road) / Virginia Beach Boulevard (US 58 Bus. east)	Eastbound exit and westbound entrance
City of Virginia Beach		23.07	37.13	7	21	First Colonial Road – Oceana Naval Air Station	Signed as exits 21A (south) and 21B (north) eastbound; former SR 408
City of Virginia Beach		24.43	39.32	8	22	Birdneck Road - Oceanfront alternate route	Eastbound exit and westbound entrance
City of Virginia Beach		25.07	40.35			Parks Avenue / 21st Street – Virginia Beach Oceanfront	Eastern terminus
1.000 mi = 1.609 km; 1.000 km = 0.621 mi: Closed/former; Concurrency terminus; Electronic toll collection; Incomplete access; Unopened

== See also ==
- Norfolk-Portsmouth Bridge-Tunnel
  - Berkley Bridge
  - Downtown Tunnel
