= Virginia State Route 168 =

State highway in southeastern Virginia, US

State Route 168

Route information
- Maintained by VDOT
- Length: 30.11 mi (48.46 km)
- Existed: 1933–present

Major junctions
- South end: NC 168 near Moyock, NC
- I-64 / I-464 in Chesapeake; I-264 in Norfolk
- North end: I-64 / US 60 in Norfolk

Location
- Country: United States
- State: Virginia

Highway system
- Virginia Routes; Interstate; US; Primary; Secondary; Byways; History; HOT lanes
← SR 167	→ SR 169

State Route 168 is a primary state highway in the South Hampton Roads region of the U.S. state of Virginia. It runs from the border with North Carolina (where it continues as North Carolina Highway 168 towards the Outer Banks) through the independent cities of Chesapeake and Norfolk where it ends in the Ocean View area near the Hampton Roads Bridge-Tunnel.

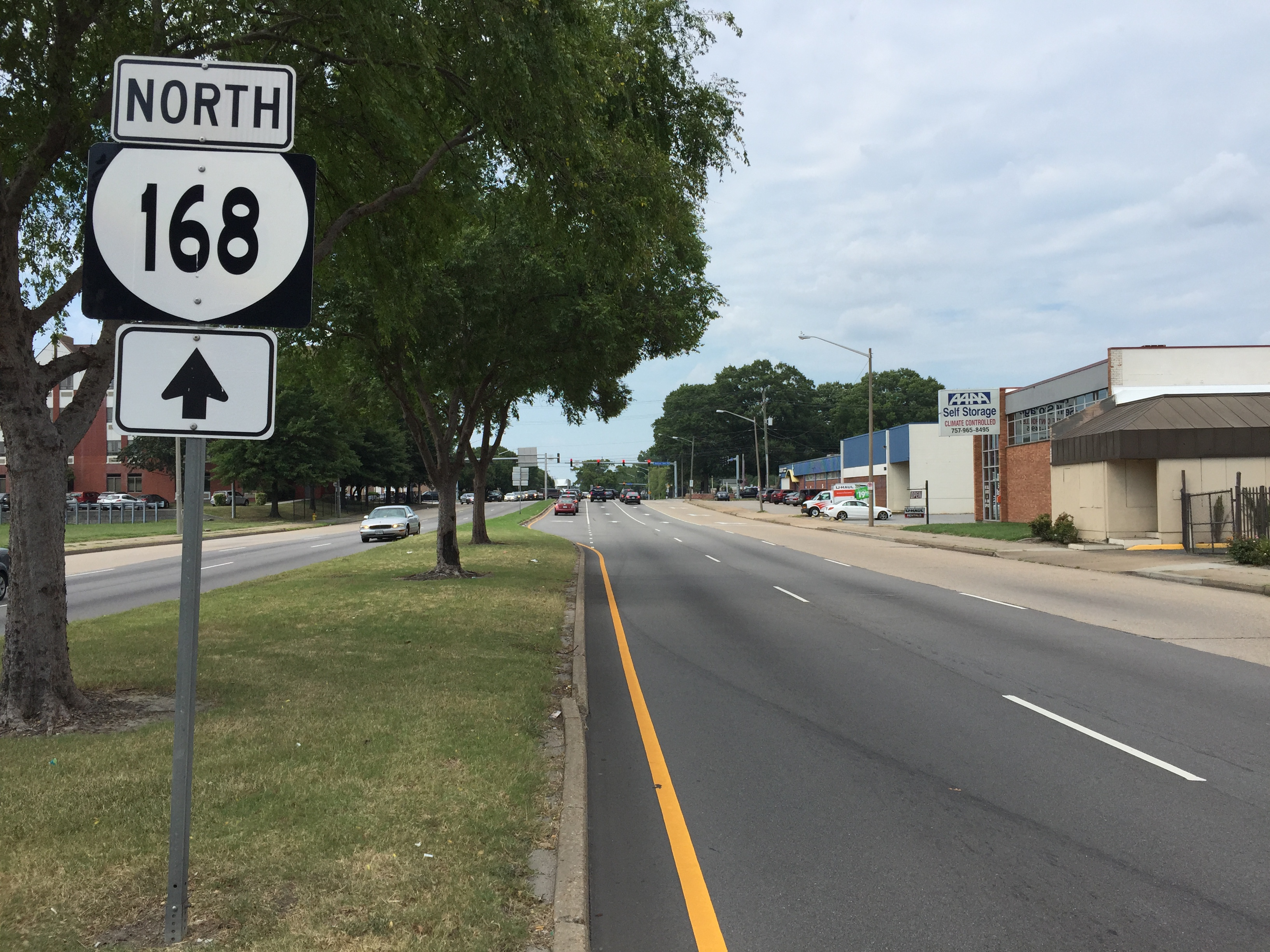
View north along SR 168 at US 58 in Norfolk

SR 168 consists of three sections with different characteristics. From North Carolina to the junction with Interstate 64 and Interstate 464, SR 168 is mostly built to freeway standards as a major road into North Carolina; nearly all of this section — the Chesapeake Expressway — is a toll road, starting within a few miles of the state line. From I-64 north into downtown Norfolk, SR 168 is a local road; I-464 carries most through traffic. The rest of SR 168, from downtown Norfolk north to Ocean View, is Tidewater Drive, an arterial road with some interchanges, built to carry traffic to the Hampton Roads Bridge-Tunnel before Interstate 64 opened.

SR 168 was originally constructed in the 1930s on the north side of Hampton Roads as Merrimack Trail, mainly as a bypass of U.S. Route 60 from Newport News past Williamsburg (now State Route 143). It was extended across Hampton Roads (via the Newport News-Pine Beach (Norfolk) Ferry) in the mid-1940s, but did not move onto its current alignment to North Carolina until 1957, when the Hampton Roads Bridge-Tunnel opened. As the new freeway (Interstate 64) opened past Williamsburg, SR 168 was shifted to it; it was truncated to its current extent around 1980.

== History ==
The SR 168 designation was applied in the 1933 renumbering to three individual roadways: State Route 529 (northwest from Newport News towards Lee Hall), State Route 532 (Newport News to Hampton via Shell Road), and State Route 533 (King Street from Rip Rap Road — then State Route 513 — south into Hampton). Another piece, from Hampton east on Pembroke Avenue towards Buckroe Beach, was added to the state highway system in 1932, and was extended to Buckroe Beach in 1936. In the 1930s, SR 168 was extended northwest to State Route 53 (now State Route 30) near Barhamsville. It used Jefferson Avenue and 35th Street in Newport News and Shell Road, Newport News Avenue, Back River Road, Rip Rap Road, King Street, and Pembroke Avenue in Hampton; see State Route 143 (Barhamsville to Hampton) and State Route 351 (Hampton to Buckroe Beach) for more history. It intersected U.S. Route 60 at Anderson's Corner, near Toano in James City County.

Route 168 was part of a system of state-funded highway improvements after World War II which preceded the federally funded Interstate Highway System in Virginia. It provided substantial traffic relief to a number of heavily traveled older U.S. highways, notably including U.S. Route 60 on the Virginia Peninsula and U.S. Route 460 in the Cities of Norfolk and South Norfolk and U.S. Route 17 in Norfolk County (now City of Chesapeake) in South Hampton Roads.

=== North Carolina to Willoughby Spit ===
In Chesapeake, the route originally ran along New Green Sea Road, now known as Battlefield Boulevard, due to its proximity from the Battle of Great Bridge. This arterial is now bypassed by several roads: the Chesapeake Expressway (a toll road completed in 2001), the Great Bridge Bypass (a bypass route constructed in 1980 and improved through the 1990s), and the Oak Grove Connector (a link from the Great Bridge Bypass to Interstate 464 completed in 1999). From the north end of the Oak Grove Connector, Route 168 overlaps Interstate 64 until it rejoins Battlefield Boulevard. The sections of the boulevard bypassed by the mentioned roads are now designated State Route 168 Business.

From I-64 in Chesapeake, Route 168 follows several roads until it crosses into the City of Norfolk and eventually runs along Tidewater Drive (following the path of the earlier Cottage Toll Road) until reaching its terminus at West Ocean View Avenue (U.S. Route 60) near Fourth View Street in the Willoughby Spit area.

=== Crossing the mouth of Hampton Roads ===
The Route 168 designation formerly continued northwesterly along West Ocean View Avenue and crossed the Hampton Roads Ferry System from Willoughby Bay to Old Point Comfort in the Town of Phoebus in Elizabeth City County (communities which were consolidated into the newly enlarged City of Hampton in 1952).

When it first opened to traffic on November 1, 1957, the Hampton Roads Bridge-Tunnel originally carried the VA-168 designation (as a toll facility). The Route 168 signage and tolls were both removed when the crossing was expanded in 1976 as part of the federally funded Interstate 64 improvements, which included four-laning the crossing.

=== On the Virginia Peninsula ===
The SR 168 designation also formerly applied to a routing on the Virginia Peninsula from Anderson's Corner near Toano west of Williamsburg to the Hampton Roads Ferry landing at Old Point Comfort near Fort Monroe. Known as the Merrimack Trail, the road was a major additional highway which was built in the years prior to the creation of the Interstate Highway System, and was replaced as a major through route by Interstate 64, in segments as that new road was completed.

Small portions of the roadway on the Peninsula originally signed as SR 168 became portions of State Route 30 (from Anderson's Corner to Croaker) and Interstate 64 (Exit 231 to Exit 238). However, most of it from Exit 238 on I-64 east was redesignated as State Route 143, which continues to serve as an alternative to U.S. Route 60 most of its length. After Interstate 64 was completed on the Peninsula, both Routes 60 and 143 with many at-grade intersections and businesses became more major conduits for local traffic than through-traffic routes.

== Major intersections ==
County	Location	mi	km	Exit	Destinations	Notes
City of Chesapeake		0.00	0.00		NC 168 south (Caratoke Highway) – Nags Head	North Carolina state line; southern terminus
City of Chesapeake		1	1.6		Old Battlefield Road to Ballahack Road	former SR 193 west
City of Chesapeake		1.79	2.88		SR 168 Bus. north (Battlefield Boulevard) / Gallbush Road	Southern end of freeway; southern terminus of SR 168 Bus.
City of Chesapeake				Toll Plaza - Cars $4 ($10 on summer weekends)		
City of Chesapeake		4.71	7.58	5	SR 168 Bus. (Battlefield Boulevard)	Northbound exit and southbound entrance
City of Chesapeake		7.65	12.31	8	Hillcrest Parkway	signed as exits 8A (west) and 8B (east) southbound
City of Chesapeake		9.86	15.87	10	Hanbury Road	signed as exits 10A (west) and 10B (east)
City of Chesapeake		11.36	18.28	11	SR 165 (Mt. Pleasant Road) – Great Bridge	signed as exits 11A (south) and 11B (north) southbound
City of Chesapeake				12	SR 190 east (Kempsville Road)	Northbound exit only (other access is at exit 13)
City of Chesapeake		13.85	22.29	13A–B	SR 168 Bus. (Battlefield Boulevard) / SR 190 – Great Bridge	signed as exits 13A (north) and 13B (south)
City of Chesapeake				15B	US 17 south – Elizabeth City	
City of Chesapeake		15.67	25.22		I-64 / US 17 north (Hampton Roads Beltway inner loop) / I-464 north to I-664 north – Portsmouth, Suffolk, Richmond, Norfolk	south end of I-64 overlap; SR 168 north follows exit 15A; SR 168 south follows exit 291B; I-464 exit 1
City of Chesapeake		16.49	26.54		I-64 (Hampton Roads Beltway outer loop) / SR 168 Bus. south (Battlefield Boulevard) – Virginia Beach, Great Bridge	north end of I-64 overlap; SR 168 north follows exit 290A
City of Chesapeake		17.31	27.86		US 13 (Military Highway)	Interchange
City of Chesapeake		19.75	31.78		Campostella Road / to Liberty Street (SR 246) / to Border Road	interchange; southbound exit and northbound entrance
City of Norfolk		20.62	33.18		SR 407 (Indian River Road)	
City of Norfolk		20.88	33.60		US 460 west / SR 166 south / SR 337 Alt. south (Wilson Road)	Southern end of US 460 / SR 166 / SR 337 Alt. concurrency; no left turn northbound
City of Norfolk				Campostella Bridge over Eastern Branch Elizabeth River		
City of Norfolk		21.61	34.78		I-264 east to I-64 / Chesapeake Bay Bridge-Tunnel – Virginia Beach, Airport	I-264 exit 11
City of Norfolk		21.91	35.26		SR 166 north (Park Avenue)	Northern end of SR 166 concurrency
City of Norfolk		22.31	35.90		US 460 east (Brambleton Avenue / SR 337 east) to I-264 west / Tidewater Drive (SR 337 west) – Portsmouth, Berkley	Northern end of US 460 / SR 337 Alt. concurrency
City of Norfolk		22.62	36.40		US 58 (Virginia Beach Boulevard)	
City of Norfolk					Princess Anne Road (SR 404 east)	Western terminus of SR 404
City of Norfolk					SR 247 (Lafayette Boulevard)	
City of Norfolk		26.50	42.65		I-64 (Hampton Roads Beltway) / Terminal Boulevard / Chesapeake Boulevard – Hampton, Richmond, Naval Base, Virginia Beach	Exit 277 (I-64)
City of Norfolk		27.06	43.55		SR 165 (Little Creek Road)	interchange
City of Norfolk		29.36	47.25		US 460 (Granby Street) to I-64 – Ocean View, Willoughby	interchange; south end of US 60 Alt. overlap (northbound only)
City of Norfolk					Peach Tree Street	interchange; southbound exit and northbound entrance
City of Norfolk					Mason Creek Road to US 60 east – Ocean View, Willoughby	north end of US 60 Alt. overlap (northbound only); south end of US 60 west overlap (northbound only)
City of Norfolk		30.11	48.46		US 60 west (4th View Street) to I-64 (Hampton Roads Tunnel)	Northern terminus; north end of US 60 west overlap (northbound only)
1.000 mi = 1.609 km; 1.000 km = 0.621 mi: Concurrency terminus; Incomplete access; Tolled

== Chesapeake Expressway ==
Chesapeake Expressway
- Location: Chesapeake, Virginia
- Length: 12.06 mi (19.41 km)

The Chesapeake Expressway is the name of the portion of SR 168 that is mostly a toll road in Chesapeake built chiefly to facilitate tourist traffic from the Hampton Roads cities en route to the Outer Banks of North Carolina. Built to freeway standards, the expressway travels from the US 17, I-64, and I-464 interchange in northern Chesapeake southward to near the North Carolina border in the far southern part of the city. The one toll plaza is located near Indian Creek Road with the freeway portion ending at Battlefield Boulevard (SR 168 Bus.) a short distance south of there. SR 168 then continues southward as an expressway until it meets NC 168 at the state line.

Construction began in 1999 and the road fully opened in 2001. As of 2026, tolls for a 2-axle passenger vehicle are $10.00 during weekends between Memorial Day and Labor Day, and $4.00 at all other times (tolls were previously $2.00 and then $3.00 at all times). E-ZPass is accepted.

== State Route 168 Business ==
State Route 168 Business
- Location: Chesapeake, Virginia
- Length: 14.40 mi (23.17 km)

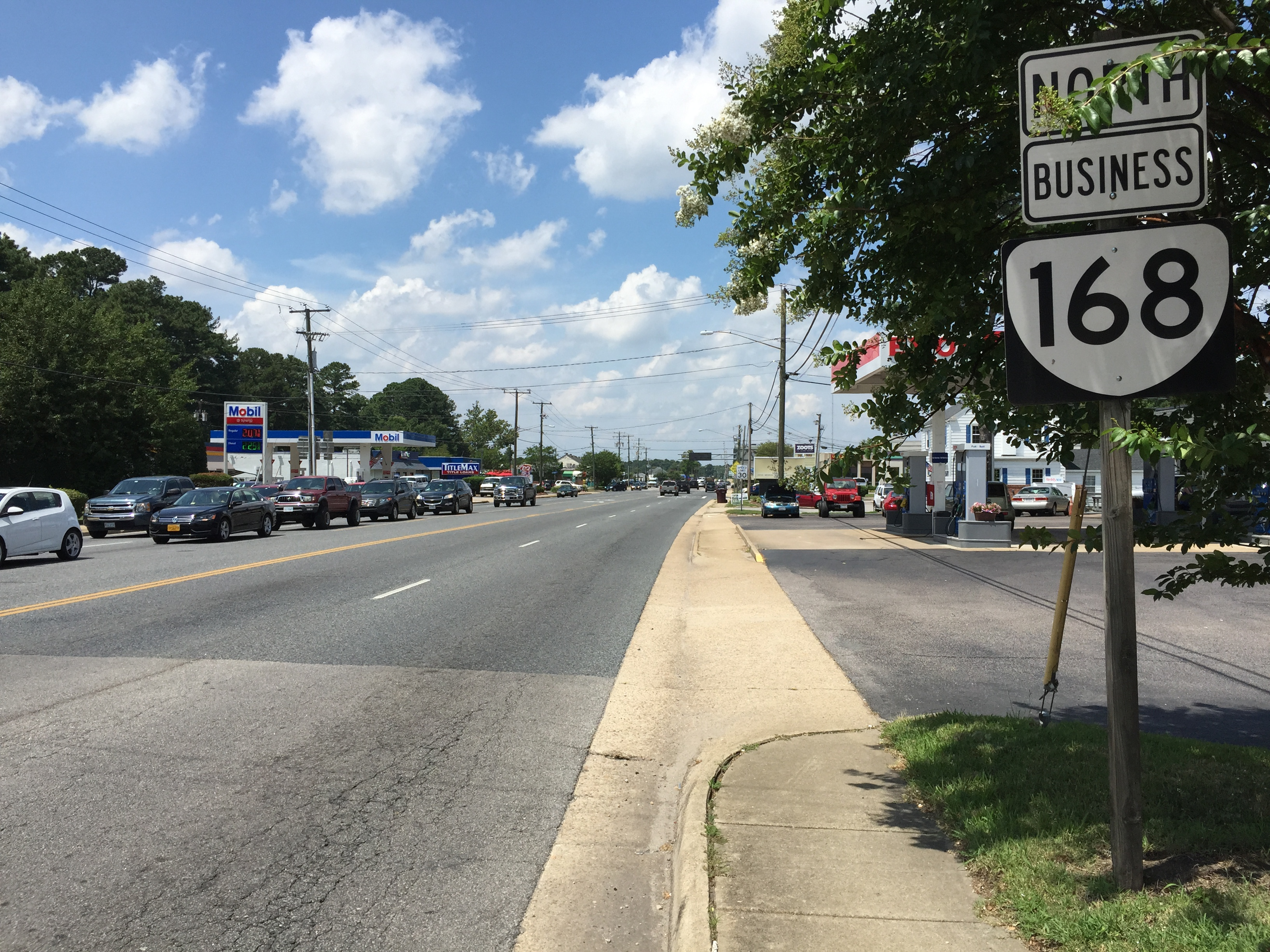
View north along SR 168 Bus. at SR 165 in Chesapeake

State Route 168 Business is a 14.40-mile (23.17 km) business route of SR 168. The entire length is also known as Battlefield Boulevard. This was originally a part of SR 168 before the Chesapeake Expressway was completed. This highway is often used to avoid the toll on the main expressway—drivers travelling North make a left turn at VA 168 Business, then enter the expressway at Hillcrest Parkway.

=== Great Bridge Bridge ===
The Great Bridge Bridge is a double-leaf rolling bascule drawbridge that carries Battlefield Blvd (SR 168 Bus.) and spans the Atlantic Intracoastal Waterway in Chesapeake, Virginia. It was constructed in 2004 by the Army Corps of Engineers and is operated by the City of Chesapeake. It has a mean daily traffic of 35,000 vehicles.

=== Major intersections ===
The entire route is in the independent city of Chesapeake.

County	Location	mi	km	Destinations	Notes
City of Chesapeake		0.00	0.00	SR 168 (Battlefield Boulevard / Chesapeake Expressway) – Norfolk, Nags Head	Southern terminus
City of Chesapeake				SR 168 south (Chesapeake Expressway)	Access from SR 168 northbound / to SR 168 southbound only, exit 5 (SR 168)
City of Chesapeake		8.13	13.08	SR 168 south (Chesapeake Expressway)	Only access to southbound SR 168 from SR 168 Bus. southbound
City of Chesapeake		8.41	13.53	Hanbury Road to SR 168	
City of Chesapeake		10.11	16.27	SR 165 north (Mt. Pleasant Road)	Southern end of SR 165 concurrency
City of Chesapeake		10.37	16.69	SR 165 south (Cedar Road)	Northern end of SR 165 concurrency
City of Chesapeake		11.61	18.68	SR 190 (Great Bridge Boulevard / Kempsville Road)	
City of Chesapeake				Great Bridge Bridge over the Atlantic Intracoastal Waterway	
City of Chesapeake		11.78	18.96	SR 168 (Great Bridge Bypass) – Nags Head, Norfolk, Suffolk	Exit 13 (SR 168)
City of Chesapeake		14.40	23.17	I-64 (Hampton Roads Beltway) / SR 168 north – Virginia Beach, Suffolk, Richmond	Exit 290 (I-64) & 1 (I-464); northern terminus
1.000 mi = 1.609 km; 1.000 km = 0.621 mi: Concurrency terminus; Incomplete access

== Campostella Bridge ==
Campostella Bridge
- Carries: US 460 / SR 168 / SR 166 Vehicles, Pedestrians
- Crosses: Elizabeth River
- Locale: Norfolk, Virginia
- Owner: City of Norfolk
- ID number: 0020936

Characteristics
- Total length: 2,482 feet (757 m)
- Width: 94.2 feet (28.7 m)

History
- Opened: 1986

Statistics
- Daily traffic: 34,000

References
- "Virginia Bridge Information".

The part of SR 168 that crosses the Elizabeth River utilizes the six-lane Campostella Bridge. The bridge is also the route carrier for US 460. Owned and operated by the city of Norfolk, it serves as an alternate route to the Berkley Bridge, which also crosses the same span of water on Interstate 264.

< SR 26	Two‑digit State Routes; 1923-1933	SR 28 >
