= Virginia State Route 407 =

State highway in southeastern Virginia, US

State Route 407
- Indian River Road

Route information
- Maintained by VDOT
- Length: 2.32 mi (3.73 km)
- Existed: early 1980s–present

Major junctions
- West end: SR 168 in Norfolk
- East end: Indian River Road at Chesapeake – Virginia Beach city line

Location
- Country: United States
- State: Virginia
- Counties: City of Norfolk, City of Chesapeake

Highway system
- Virginia Routes; Interstate; US; Primary; Secondary; Byways; History; HOT lanes
← SR 406	→ SR 409

State Route 407 (SR 407) is a primary state highway in the U.S. state of Virginia. Known as Indian River Road, the state highway runs 2.32 miles (3.73 km) from SR 168 in Norfolk east to a continuation of Indian River Road at the boundary between the independent cities of Chesapeake and Virginia Beach. SR 407 connects U.S. Route 460 (US 460) and US 13 on the south side of the Eastern Branch Elizabeth River.

== Route description ==
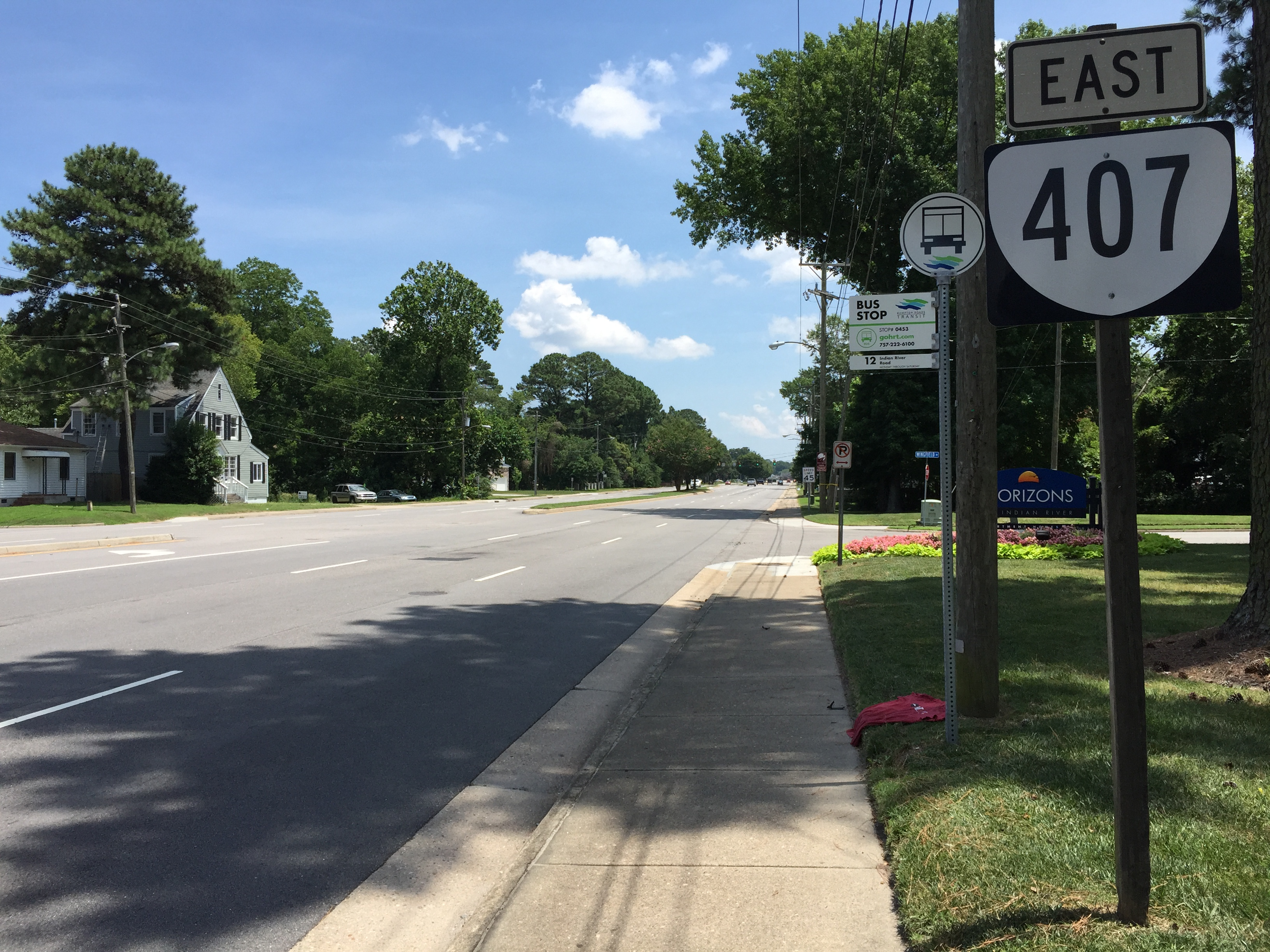
View east along SR 407 in Chesapeake

SR 407 begins at an intersection with SR 168 (Campostella Road) in the city of Norfolk. Indian River Road continues west toward the Berkley neighborhood of the city and intersects Wilson Road, which carries US 460 and SR 168. Access to westbound US 460 and southbound SR 166 toward Chesapeake is via continuing west to Wilson Road; access to eastbound US 460 and northbound SR 166 to cross the Campostella Bridge over the Eastern Branch Elizabeth River toward Downtown Norfolk is via SR 168. Though not designated as such by the Virginia Department of Transportation (VDOT) as such, Indian River Road west of here and Berkley Avenue to the SR 337 intersection is signed as a part of SR 407. SR 407 heads east as a six-lane divided highway that crosses over Steamboat Creek and passes the former Ford assembly plant before entering the city of Chesapeake by crossing over a Norfolk Southern Railway line. The state highway passes through residential neighborhoods and crosses the Indian River before reaching its eastern terminus at MacDonald Road, which follows the boundary between Chesapeake and the city of Virginia Beach. Indian River Road continues east as an unnumbered highway through an intersection with US 13 (Military Highway).

== Major intersections ==
County	Location	mi	km	Destinations	Notes
City of Norfolk		0.00	0.00	SR 168 (Campostella Road) to US 460 / SR 166 / Indian River Road west	Western terminus
City of Chesapeake		2.32	3.73	Indian River Road east / MacDonald Road to US 13	Chesapeake – Virginia Beach city boundary; eastern terminus
1.000 mi = 1.609 km; 1.000 km = 0.621 mi
