= Virginia State Route 149 =

State highway in the City of Virginia Beach, Virginia, US

State Route 149
- Princess Anne Road

Route information
- Maintained by VDOT
- Length: 1.92 mi (3.09 km)
- Existed: 1940s–present

Major junctions
- West end: SR 165 in Virginia Beach
- East end: Princess Anne Road in Virginia Beach

Location
- Country: United States
- State: Virginia
- Counties: City of Virginia Beach

Highway system
- Virginia Routes; Interstate; US; Primary; Secondary; Byways; History; HOT lanes
← SR 148	→ SR 150

State Route 149 (SR 149) is a primary state highway in the U.S. state of Virginia. Known as Princess Anne Road, the highway runs 1.92 miles (3.09 km) from SR 165 east to a point near the intersection of Princess Anne Road and General Booth Boulevard in the independent city of Virginia Beach.

== Route description ==
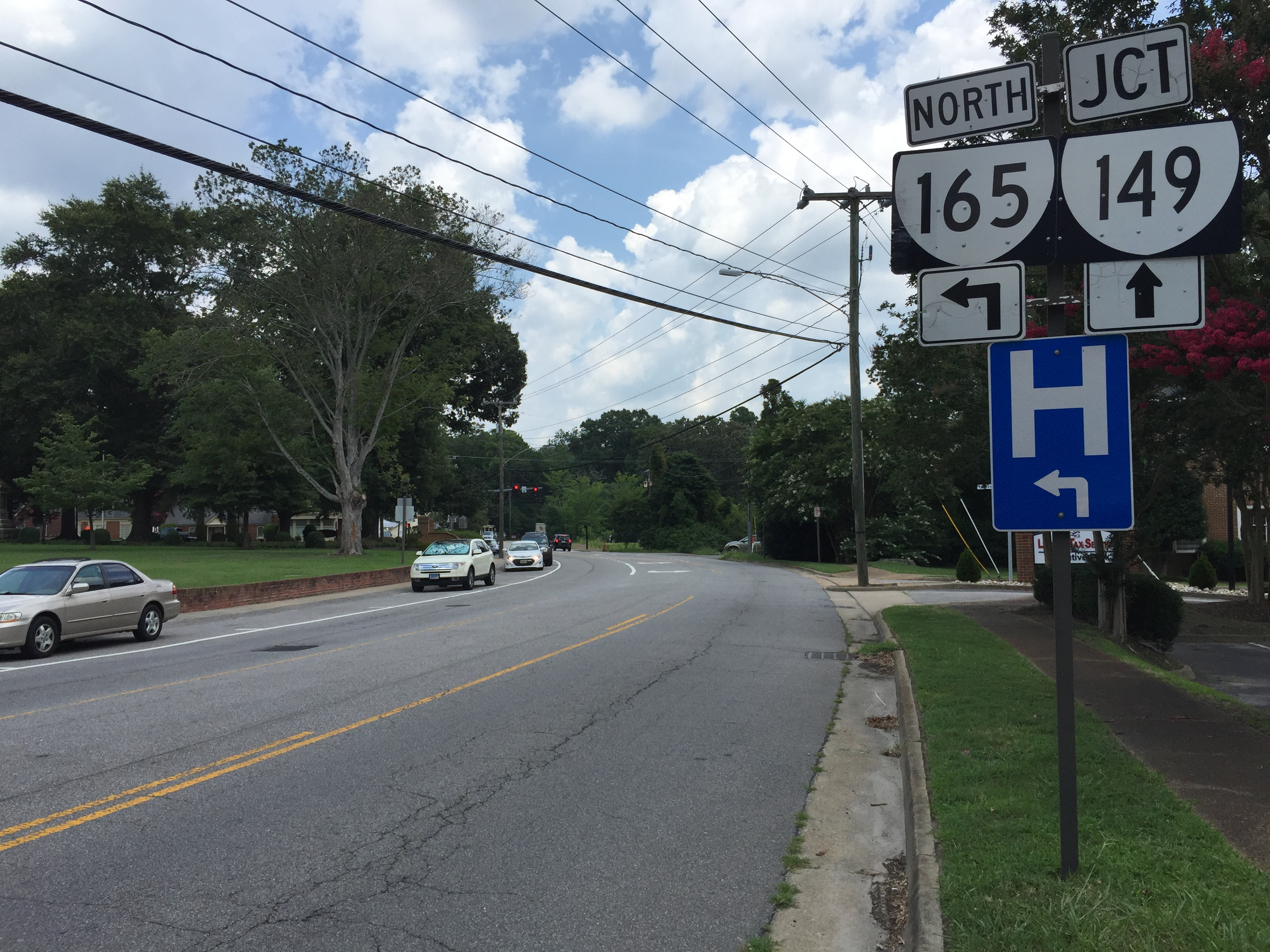
The junction of SR 165 and SR 149 in Virginia Beach

SR 149 begins in the Princess Anne section of the city of Virginia Beach, which contains the city offices and courthouse, a vestige of when the community was the county seat of Princess Anne County. SR 165 heads northwest as Princess Anne Road toward the city of Norfolk and southwest as North Landing Road toward the city of Chesapeake. SR 149 heads east as a two-lane undivided road that passes by a residential subdivision and through a swampy area where the highway crosses West Neck Creek. The state highway enters a suburban residential area shortly before reaching its terminus at an indeterminate point just west of where Princess Anne Road expands to a four-lane divided highway. Princess Anne Road turns south toward Knotts Island, North Carolina at the following intersection with General Booth Boulevard in the community of Nimmo. General Booth Boulevard heads northeast toward the Virginia Beach Oceanfront.

== Major intersections ==
The entire route is in Virginia Beach.

mi	km	Destinations	Notes
0.00	0.00	SR 165 (Princess Anne Road / North Landing Road)	Western terminus
		Holland Road	former SR 410 north
1.92	3.09	Princess Anne Road / General Booth Boulevard – Oceanfront, Pungo, Munden Point, Knotts Island	Eastern terminus; former SR 615
1.000 mi = 1.609 km; 1.000 km = 0.621 mi
