= KCPK =

KCPK may refer to:

- Chesapeake Regional Airport (ICAO code KCPK)
- KCPK-LP, a low-power radio station (106.9 FM) licensed to serve Pine Mountain Club, California, United States
