= Virginia State Route 403 =

State highway in southeastern Virginia, US

State Route 403
- Newtown Road

Route information
- Maintained by VDOT
- Length: 1.02 mi (1.64 km)
- Existed: early 1980s–present

Major junctions
- South end: SR 165 on Norfolk-Virginia Beach border
- I-264 on Norfolk-Virginia Beach border
- North end: US 58 on Norfolk-Virginia Beach border

Location
- Country: United States
- State: Virginia
- Counties: Norfolk and Virginia Beach (independent cities)

Highway system
- Virginia Routes; Interstate; US; Primary; Secondary; Byways; History; HOT lanes
← SR 402	→ SR 404

State Route 403 (SR 403 / Newtown Road) is a 1.02-mile (1.64 km) primary state highway that runs along the border of the independent cities of Norfolk and Virginia Beach in Virginia, United States, that connects Virginia State Route 165 (SR 165) with U.S. Route 58 (US 58). It also connects with Interstate 264 (I‑264).

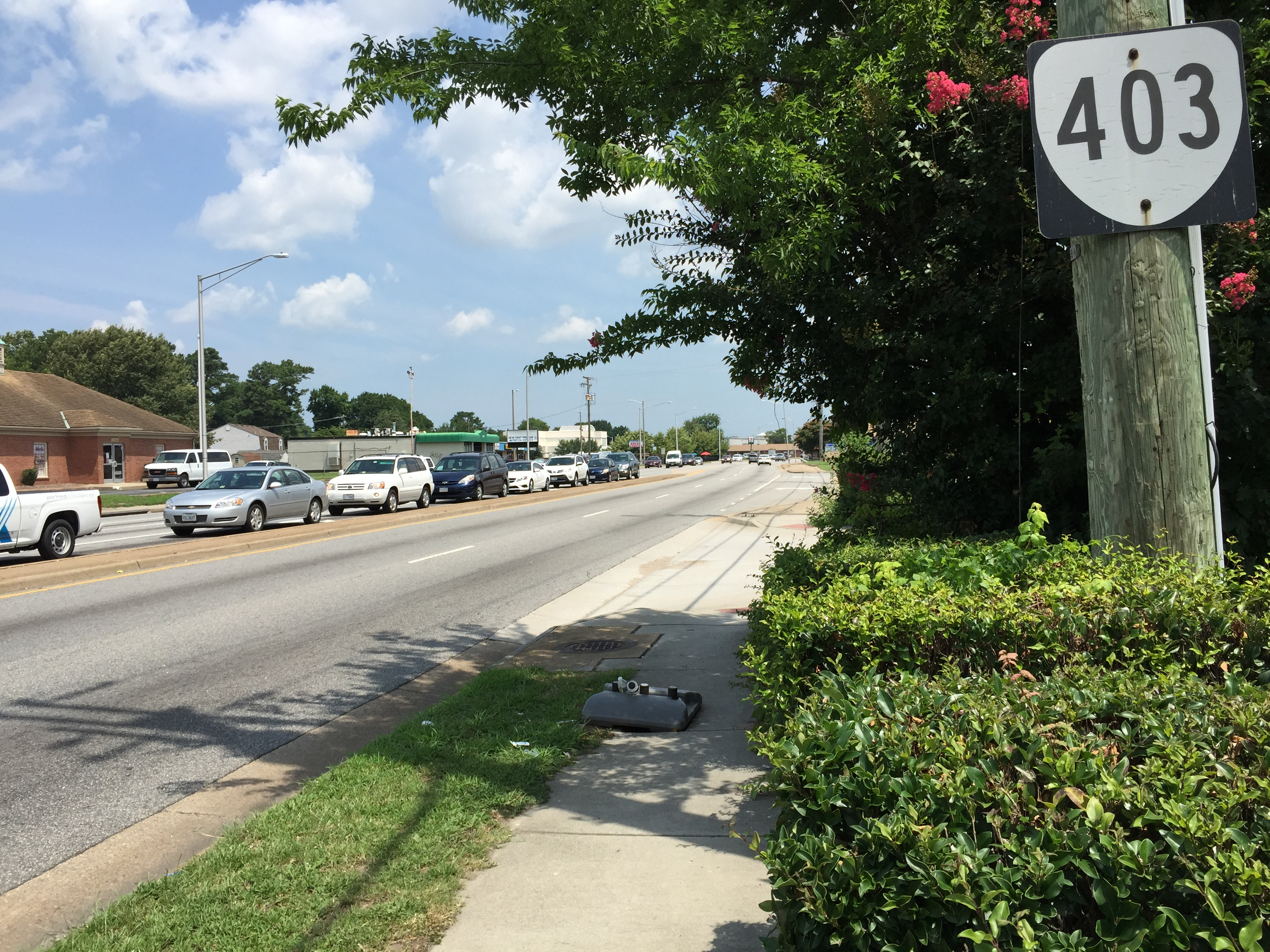
View north along SR 403 at US 58 on the border of Norfolk and Virginia Beach, July 2017

== Route description ==
SR 403 begins at an intersection with SR 165 (Kempsville Road/Princess Anne Road), just northeast of the Newtown Road station (the eastern terminus of Hampton Roads Transit's Tide Light Rail). The roadway continues southerly as South Newtown Road (an unnumbered street). From its southern terminus SR 403 heads north-northeasterly through commercial area as Newton Road, a four-lane divided highway that closely parallels the boundary between the cities of Norfolk and Virginia Beach.

Just short of a third of a mile (1/2 km) along its route, SR 403 has a partial cloverleaf interchange with I‑264 (Virginia Beach Expressway), with provides access to I-64 (Hampton Roads Beltway)--at the interchange of the Interstate Highways just to the west of the SR 403 interchange. After connecting with multiple minor side streets (Ethan Allen Lane/Cleveland Street, Coliss Avenue, Hawk Street, Elam Avenue, Taft Street, and Seal Street), SR 403 reaches its northern terminus at an intersection with US 58 (Virginia Beach Boulevard). Beyond the intersection Newtown Road continues as an unnumbered highway that enters the city of Virginia Beach.

== Major intersections ==
The entire route is on the Norfolk / Virginia Beach line.

mi	km	Destinations	Notes
0.00	0.00	SR 165 (Princess Anne Road / Kempsville Road) / Newtown Road (south)	Southern terminus
0.31	0.50	I-264 (Virginia Beach Expressway) – I-64 (Hampton Roads Beltway), Chesapeake	Exit 15 on I-264
1.02	1.64	US 58 (Virginia Beach Boulevard) / Newtown Road (north)	Northern terminus
1.000 mi = 1.609 km; 1.000 km = 0.621 mi

== See also ==
- List of state highways in Virginia
- List of highways numbered 403
