= Virginia State Route 337 =

State highway in Virginia, United States

State Route 337

Route information
- Maintained by VDOT
- Length: 35.83 mi (57.66 km)
- Existed: by 1939–present

Major junctions
- West end: US 58 Bus. in Suffolk
- I-664 in Chesapeake; I-264 / US 460 Alt. in Portsmouth; US 17 in Portsmouth; I-264 / I-464 / US 460 Alt. in Norfolk; US 58 / US 460 in Norfolk
- East end: I-564 in Norfolk

Location
- Country: United States
- State: Virginia

Highway system
- Virginia Routes; Interstate; US; Primary; Secondary; Byways; History; HOT lanes
← SR 336	→ SR 338

State Route 337 (SR 337) is a primary state highway in the South Hampton Roads area of the U.S. state of Virginia. It runs east from Suffolk to Portsmouth, where it crosses Jordan Bridge. It continues on the east side of the Southern Branch Elizabeth River in the South Norfolk neighborhood of Chesapeake. There it turns north, through Norfolk, crossing the Berkley Bridge into downtown, and ending at the Naval Station Norfolk at Sewell's Point. Most of its length was formed when other highways were rerouted: U.S. Route 460 from Suffolk to South Norfolk, SR 170 (now SR 168) from South Norfolk to downtown Norfolk, and US 17 from downtown Norfolk to Sewell's Point (the former location of the Newport News Ferry). SR 337 is the only numbered highway to cross all three Branches of the Elizabeth River. It crosses the Western Branch as Portsmouth Boulevard at the Hodges Ferry Bridge, the Southern Branch on the Jordan Bridge, and the Eastern Branch on the Berkley Bridge. The Berkley Bridge is a drawbridge. SR 337 also crosses the Lafayette River in the city of Norfolk.

== Route description ==
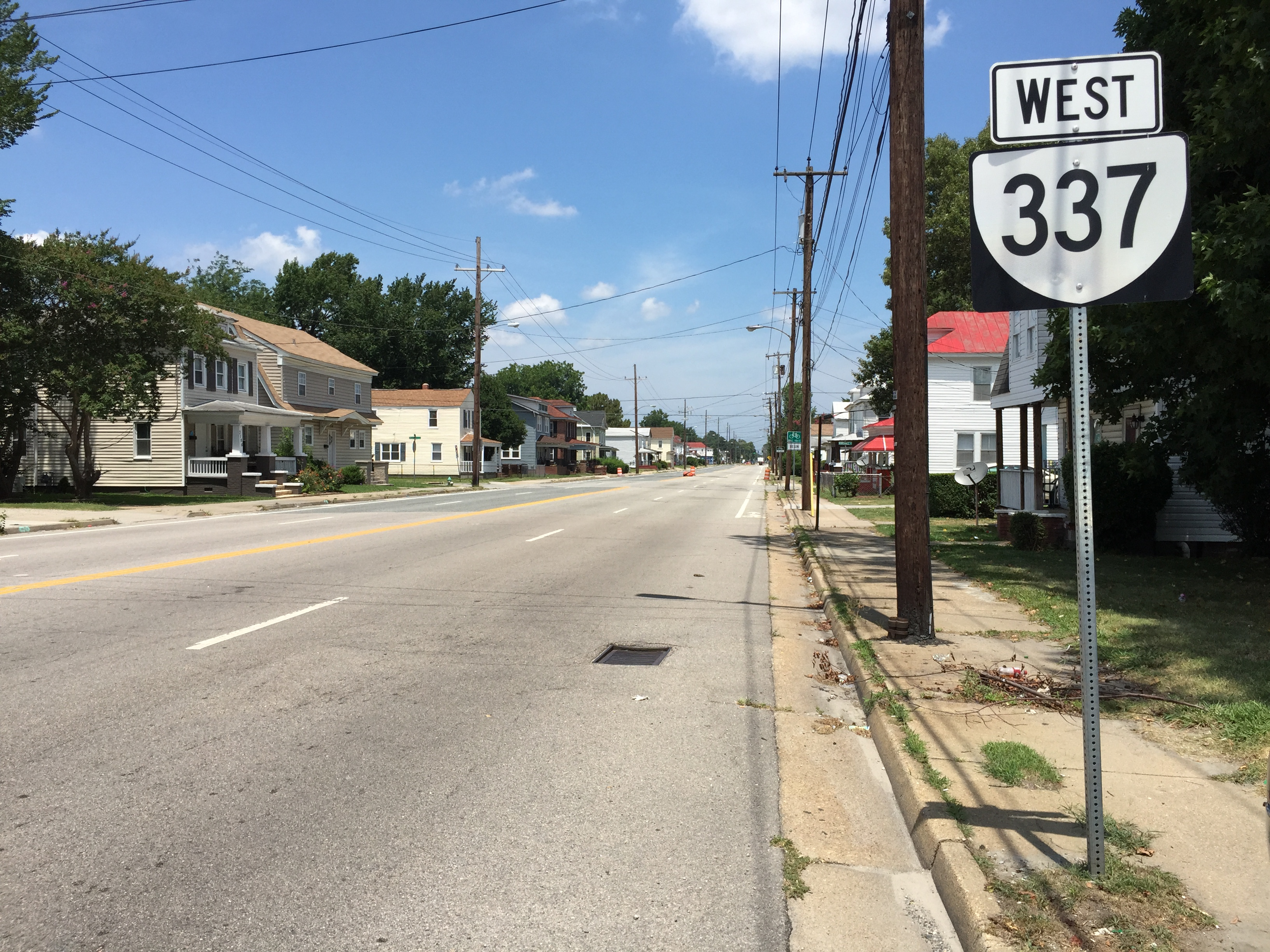
View west along SR 337 (Elm Avenue) in Portsmouth

SR 337 begins at U.S. Route 58 Business west of downtown Suffolk and ends at the north end of Interstate 564 at Naval Station Norfolk. It uses a number of different streets to get there. Through downtown Suffolk, SR 337 is Washington Street. This becomes Nansemond Parkway after crossing US 58 Bus. at Magnolia, and becomes Portsmouth Boulevard as it enters Chesapeake. The name remains after it enters Portsmouth via the Hodges Ferry Bridge, including a short concurrency with US 460 Alt. between US 58 and I-264, until the Elm Avenue intersection. There SR 337 turns south on Elm Avenue, which turns east to reach the Jordan Bridge. At the Jordan Bridge, SR 337 again enters Chesapeake, heading east on Poindexter Street across I-464 and north on Bainbridge Boulevard. (US 460 and SR 166 use the other two legs of the Poindexter-Bainbridge intersection.)

Bainbridge Boulevard takes SR 337 into Norfolk, where it makes several turns onto Main Street, Liberty Street, State Street, and Berkeley Avenue to join I-464, quickly merging into I-464 (and US 460 Alt.) over the Berkley Bridge. SR 337 leaves I-264 in downtown Norfolk to head north on Tidewater Drive. (US 460 Alt. also leaves there, but onto St. Pauls Boulevard.) SR 337 turns west at Brambleton Avenue, joining US 460 for a short while before it turns onto St. Pauls Boulevard. Between Boush Street and the Midtown Tunnel interchange, SR 337 is concurrent with US 58; US 58 runs into the tunnel while SR 337 turns north there onto Hampton Boulevard. Inside the Naval Station Norfolk, SR 337 turns east on Admiral Taussig Boulevard to end at the beginning of I-564, where Taussig Boulevard becomes a freeway.

=== Alternate routes ===
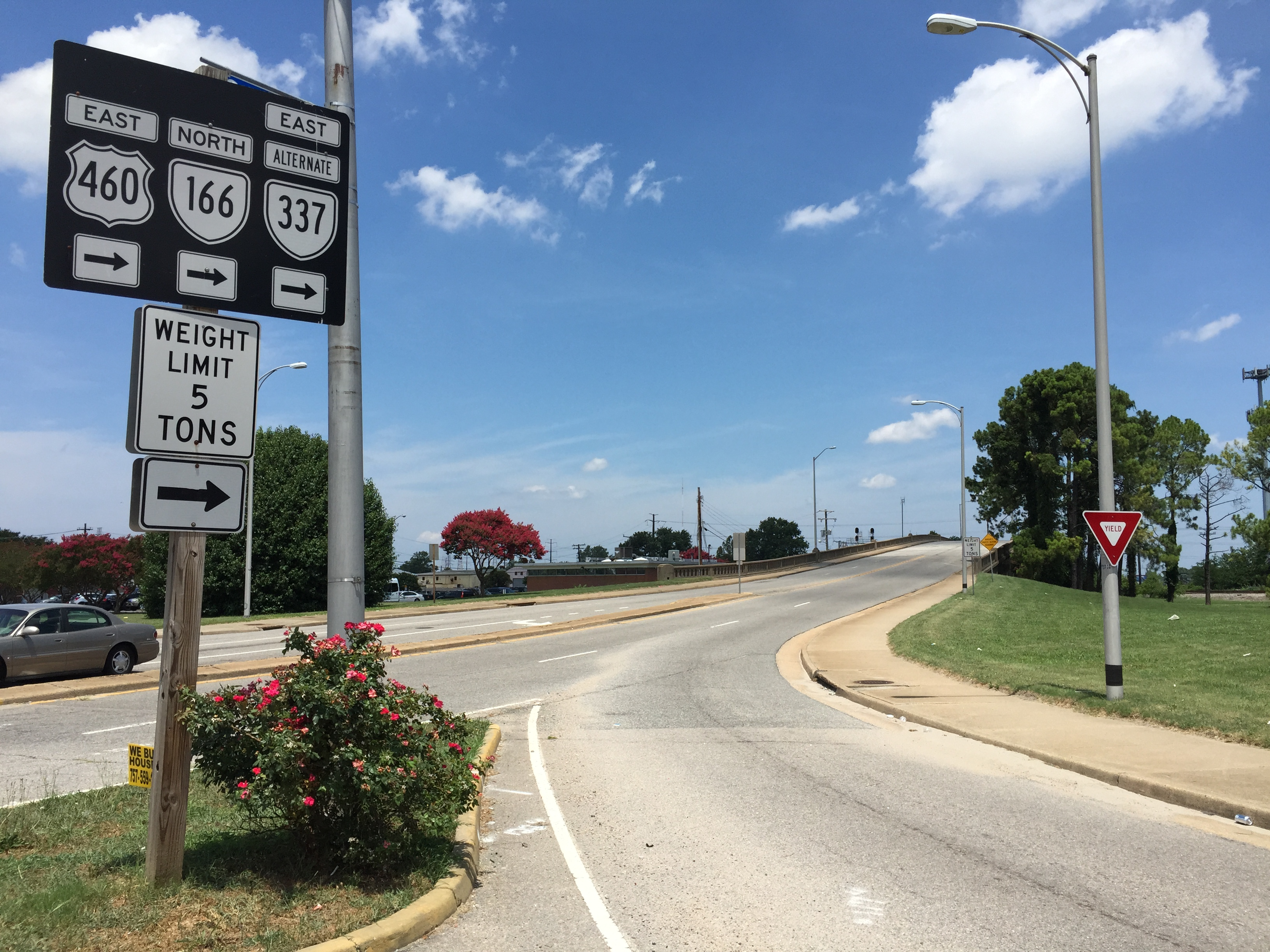
SR 337 Alt. concurrent with US 460 and SR 166 in South Norfolk

There are three routes known as State Route 337 Alternate, one in Portsmouth, one in downtown Norfolk, and one along US 460 in South Norfolk and Norfolk. The Portsmouth route does not return to SR 337 at its east end.

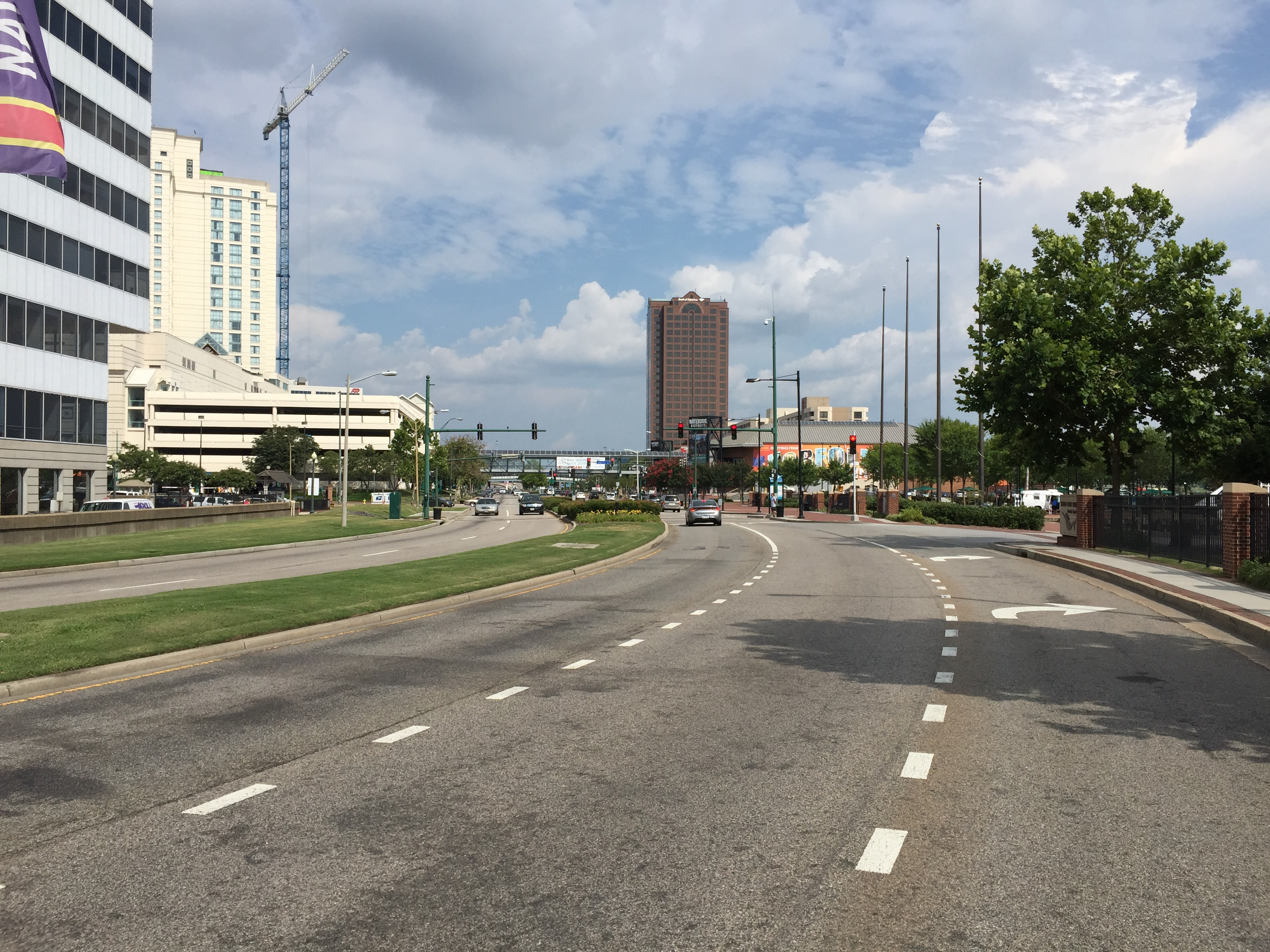
View south along SR 337 Alt. in downtown Norfolk

The 1.09 miles (1.75 km) downtown Norfolk route uses Waterside Drive and Boush Street between the Berkley Bridge (SR 337/I-264/US 460 Alt.) and Brambleton Avenue (SR 337/US 58). The route runs by major attractions such as Waterside Marketplace, Town Point Park, and Nauticus. Waterside Drive was built in order to revive the Downtown area. According to the traffic counts, southbound traffic uses Duke Street from Brambleton Avenue south to Tazewell Street, but the one-way pair no longer exists, as Norfolk has made Boush Street two-way.

== History ==
By 1939, SR 337 existed along 21st Street and Hampton Boulevard from Granby Street (part of State Route 27, State Route 170 after 1940) near downtown Norfolk north to the Newport News Ferry at Sewell's Point. This route and its extension to downtown, using Hampton Boulevard, 21st Street, Granby Street, Princess Anne Road, Bank Street, Main Street, and Commercial Place to the Portsmouth Ferry in downtown Norfolk, had been designated as a state highway in 1932, to be maintained by Norfolk with aid from Virginia under Chapter 415, Acts of 1932. It was initially part of US 17, but in the early 1930s US 17 was rerouted west of Norfolk via the James River Bridge, bypassing both ferries. The part south of 21st Street and Granby Street was still SR 27, but the rest became SR 337 (or was unnumbered for several years).

In 1942 or 1943, US 460 was moved onto its current alignment between downtown Suffolk and South Norfolk, using US 58, the Norfolk Bypass (State Route 13, now US 13), and former SR 170 (moved then to a more easterly alignment between Great Bridge and downtown Norfolk). The part of former US 460 from Main Street and Washington Street in downtown Suffolk to Park Avenue and Bainbridge Boulevard in South Norfolk became an extension of SR 337 (this was State Route 287 from July 1933 to 1934). In South Norfolk, SR 337 then followed US 460 and former SR 170 north on Bainbridge Boulevard and northeast on Poindexter Street. US 460 continued northeast on Wilson Road, but SR 337 replaced SR 170 northwest on Liberty Street into Norfolk and north on Main Street over the old Berkley Bridge. In downtown Norfolk, it continued along former SR 170 on Main Street and Bank Street, merging with SR 170 at Brambleton Avenue. The routes continued together along Bank Street, Princess Anne Road, and Granby Street to the former south end of SR 337 (21st Street).

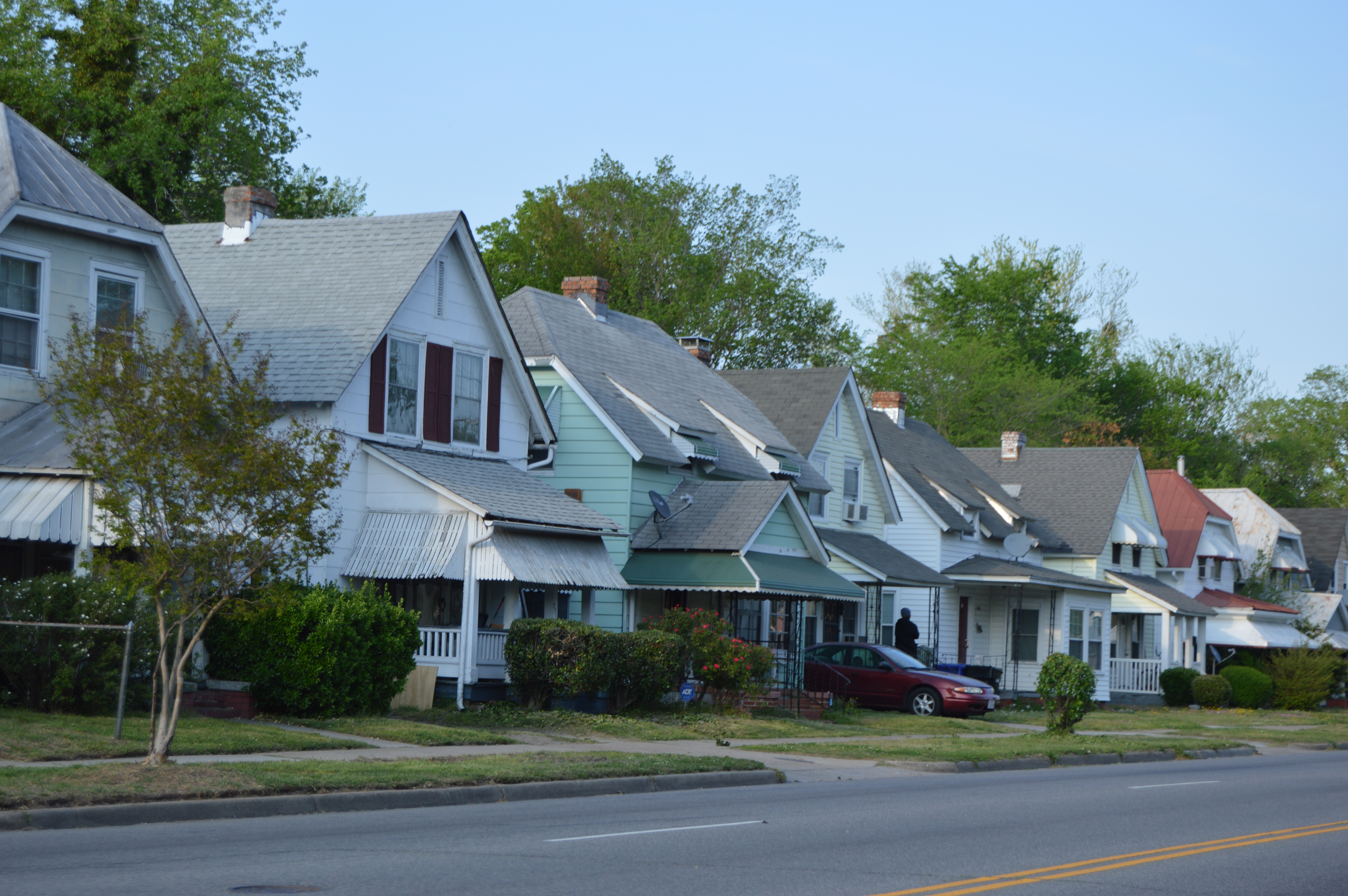
SR 337 in Portsmouth's Truxtun neighborhood

An alternate route was formed in 1947 in South Norfolk and Norfolk by request of those two cities. The route was completely locally maintained, receiving none of the state funds that were typically assigned to numbered routes in cities. It began at the intersection of Bainbridge Boulevard and Poindexter Street, and traveled north on Bainbridge Boulevard and northeast on Main Street to end at Liberty Street. This alternate became the main route in 1953, with a corresponding transfer in state funding. The portion of Liberty Street between Poindexter Street and Main Street thus became unnumbered, while the piece of Poindexter Street that had carried SR 337 continued to carry US 460. However, at the same time, a new alternate route was created, entirely concurrent with US 460 (Poindexter Street, Wilson Road, Campostella Road, and Brambleton Avenue) between Bainbridge Boulevard in South Norfolk and Bank Street in downtown Norfolk. It was eliminated by 1957.

When the Berkley Bridge replacement was being planned, it was temporarily assigned the State Route 337 Alternate designation in 1951, pending the completion of the "Norfolk Traffic Study". The bridge opened in 1952, and in 1953 SR 337 was rerouted to use it. The new alignment began at the intersection of Main and Liberty Streets and used Liberty and State Streets to reach the bridge. On the downtown side it exited onto City Hall Avenue, rejoining the former SR 337 at Bank Street. Part of the former SR 337 was deleted, but US 58 continued to use Main Street between Commercial Place (the Portsmouth Ferry approach) and the north end of the old Berkley Bridge until the Downtown Tunnel opened. Southbound traffic, at least after the tunnel opened, used Liberty Street from the south end of the bridge to State Street.

Also in 1953, the new US 58 bypass of downtown Suffolk (now US 58 Bus.) was completed. US 58 was rerouted onto the bypass, and SR 337 was extended west from Main Street in downtown Suffolk (where US 58 had previously turned) along Washington Street to the west end of the bypass, where it continues to end today.

In 1957, once the relocation of Bank Street (now St. Pauls Boulevard) and reconstruction of Monticello Avenue north of Brambleton Avenue was completed, the numbered routes in Norfolk were modified. Coming off the bridge into downtown Norfolk, SR 337 instead turned east at City Hall Avenue, running onto Tidewater Drive along with US 58. At Virginia Beach Boulevard, where US 58 turned east, SR 337 turned west, turning north on Monticello Avenue (US 460) and west on 21st Street to rejoin its former route.

In 1962, SR 337 was rerouted off 21st Street to use the rebuilt Brambleton Avenue. It turned off Tidewater Drive at Brambleton (there US 460), running west and northwest to the new Midtown Tunnel interchange. It turned north there onto Hampton Boulevard, rejoining the old route at 21st Street. 21st Street was dropped from the state highway system; the piece of Virginia Beach Boulevard that had been used by SR 337 was reassigned to US 58, which ran concurrently with the new SR 337 between Bank Street (St. Pauls Boulevard) and the Midtown Tunnel.

The final changes in the alignment of SR 337 were caused by Interstate Highways. I-564 replaced part of SR 170, which had shared a terminus with SR 337 at the Naval Air Station Norfolk, in 1979. The northern section, from the end of I-564 along Admiral Taussig Boulevard to SR 337, became an extension of SR 337. In the late 1980s, I-464 was completed to I-264 between the Downtown Tunnel and Berkley Bridge, resulting in a reconfiguration of the interchange where SR 337 had joined I-264 to cross the bridge. Both bridge ramps now serve Berkley Avenue, which SR 337 now uses to get between the bridge and State Street. A direct connection was also built at that time from the Jordan Bridge to the intersection of Bainbridge Boulevard and Poindexter Street, in conjunction with a full interchange at I-464. The section on Park Avenue was removed, along with the concurrency with US 460 and SR 166, in favor of the direct connection.

The original Jordan Bridge closed on November 8, 2008, and was reopened as the South Norfolk Jordan Bridge in October 2012.

Hodges Ferry Bridge
- Carries: State Route 337
- Crosses: Western Branch of the Elizabeth River
- Locale: Chesapeake

== Hodges Ferry Bridge ==
Hodges Ferry Bridge is the named bridge that carries State Route 337 across the Western Branch of the Elizabeth River in the Independent city of Chesapeake in the South Hampton Roads region of southeastern Virginia.

At the point it crosses the Western Branch, Route 337 is also named Portsmouth Boulevard.

== Major intersections ==
County	Location	mi	km	Destinations	Notes
City of Suffolk		0.00	0.00	US 58 Bus. (West Constance Road / West Washington Street)	Western terminus
City of Suffolk		0.93	1.50	US 13 Bus. / SR 10 west / SR 32 (Main Street)	Eastern terminus of SR 10
City of Suffolk		4.00	6.44	US 13 Bus. / US 58 Bus. / US 460 Bus. (Portsmouth Boulevard) – Downtown Suffolk, Portsmouth, Norfolk	
City of Suffolk		10.44	16.80	SR 125 west (Kings Highway) – Driver	Eastern terminus of SR 125
City of Chesapeake		13.68	22.02	SR 191 south (Jolliff Road)	Northern terminus of SR 191
City of Chesapeake		14.36	23.11	I-664 – Newport News, Chesapeake	Exit 11 (I-664)
Western Branch Elizabeth River				Hodges Ferry Bridge	
City of Portsmouth		18.47	29.72	SR 239 east (Victory Boulevard) – truck route to I-264	
City of Portsmouth		18.70	30.09	US 58 / US 460 Alt. west (Airline Boulevard)	Western end of US 460 Alt. concurrency
City of Portsmouth		18.80	30.26	SR 337 Alt. east (Turnpike Road)	Western terminus of SR 337 Alt.
City of Portsmouth		18.95	30.50	I-264 east / US 460 Alt. east	I-264 exit 4; eastbound exit and westbound entrance; east end of US 460 Alt. overlap
City of Portsmouth		18.95	30.50	I-264 west	I-264 exit 4; westbound exit and westbound entrance
City of Portsmouth		20.40	32.83	US 17 (Frederick Boulevard)	
City of Portsmouth		21.51	34.62	SR 141 (George Washington Highway) – Tidewater Community College	
City of Portsmouth		22.23	35.78	SR 239 west (Victory Boulevard)	Eastern terminus of SR 239
Southern Branch Elizabeth River				Jordan Bridge	
City of Chesapeake		23.38	37.63	I-464 – Norfolk, Virginia Beach	Exit 4 (I-464)
City of Chesapeake		23.84	38.37	US 460 / SR 166 / SR 337 Alt. east (Bainbridge Boulevard / Poindexter Street)	
City of Norfolk		25.64	41.26	I-264 west (Downtown Tunnel / US 460 Alt. west) / I-464 south – Portsmouth, Chesapeake	Western end of I-264 / US 460 Alt. concurrency; SR 337 west follows exit 8
City of Norfolk				Berkley Bridge over Eastern Branch Elizabeth River	
City of Norfolk				Waterside Drive (SR 337 Alt. east) / St. Paul's Boulevard (US 460 Alt. east) / City Hall Avenue	I-264 exit 9; east end of US 460 Alt. overlap
City of Norfolk		25.89	41.67	I-264 east – Virginia Beach, Norfolk International Airport	east end of I-264 overlap; eastbound exit and westbound entrance; SR 337 east follows exit 10
City of Norfolk		26.91	43.31	US 460 west / SR 168 (Brambleton Avenue / Tidewater Drive / SR 337 Alt. west) to I-264 east	Western end of US 460 concurrency
City of Norfolk		27.01	43.47	US 460 east (Church Street)	east end of US 460 overlap; west end of US 460 Alt. overlap
City of Norfolk				US 460 Alt. west (St. Paul's Boulevard)	east end of US 460 Alt. overlap
City of Norfolk		27.52	44.29	Boush Street (SR 337 Alt. west)	no left turn eastbound
City of Norfolk		27.59	44.40	US 58 east (Duke Street) – Chrysler Museum	Western end of US 58 concurrency
City of Norfolk		28.68– 28.90	46.16– 46.51	US 58 west (Midtown Tunnel) to I-264 west – Portsmouth, Suffolk, Chelsea, NS Railway Lambert's Point Docks	Eastern end of US 58 concurrency; interchange
City of Norfolk		30.02	48.31	SR 247 east (West 26th Street)	Western terminus of SR 247
City of Norfolk				Hampton Boulevard Bridge over Lafayette River	
City of Norfolk		32.80	52.79	SR 165 east (West Little Creek Road) – Airport, Botanical Garden	Western terminus of SR 165
City of Norfolk		32.98	53.08	SR 406 east (Terminal Boulevard) to I-564 / I-64 – NIT, Virginia Beach	Western terminus of SR 406
City of Norfolk		35.83	57.66	I-564 east	Eastern terminus; western terminus of I-564
1.000 mi = 1.609 km; 1.000 km = 0.621 mi: Concurrency terminus; Tolled
