= Interstate 464 =

Highway in Virginia

Interstate 464
- I-464 highlighted in red

Route information
- Auxiliary route of I-64
- Maintained by VDOT
- Length: 5.67 mi (9.12 km)
- NHS: Entire route

Major junctions
- South end: US 17 / SR 168 in Chesapeake
- I-64 in Chesapeake; US 13 in Chesapeake; SR 337 in Chesapeake
- North end: I-264 / US 460 / SR 337 in Norfolk

Location
- Country: United States
- State: Virginia
- Counties: City of Chesapeake, City of Norfolk

Highway system
- Interstate Highway System; Main; Auxiliary; Suffixed; Business; Future; Virginia Routes; Interstate; US; Primary; Secondary; Byways; History; HOT lanes
← US 460	→ I-495

Interstate 464 (I-464) is an Interstate Highway in the US state of Virginia. The highway runs 5.67 miles (9.12 km) from U.S. Route 17 (US 17) and State Route 168 (SR 168) in Chesapeake north to I-264 in Norfolk. I-464 connects two major highway junctions in the South Hampton Roads region. At its southern end, the Interstate meets two major highways that head toward North Carolina, US 17 and SR 168, and I-64, which follows the southern side of the Hampton Roads Beltway. At its northern terminus, I-464 has connections with Downtown Norfolk and Portsmouth via I-264.

== Route description ==
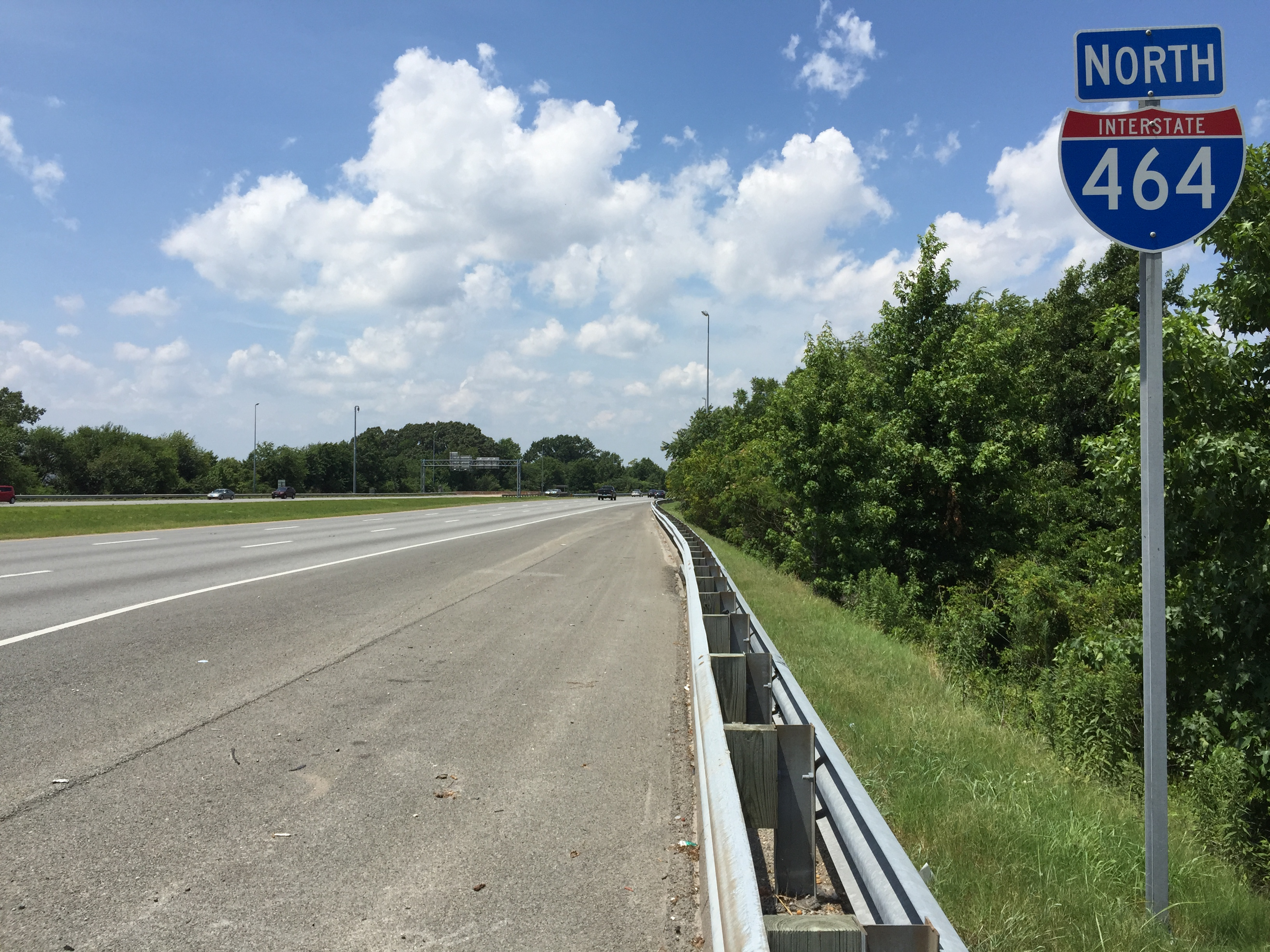
View north along I-464 between US 13 and Freeman Avenue in Chesapeake

I-464 begins in the city of Chesapeake at the northern end of the directional interchange between US 17 (Dominion Boulevard) and SR 168 (Oak Grove Connector). US 17 heads south toward the Inner Banks community of Elizabeth City. SR 168 heads south toward the Outer Banks, including Nags Head and Manteo. Just north of I-464's terminus is a cloverleaf interchange with I-64 (Hampton Roads Beltway), between which US 17 and SR 168 run concurrently with northbound and southbound I-464, respectively. US 17 and SR 168 join I-64 for their own short concurrencies, with US 17 heading west toward Suffolk and SR 168 heading east toward Virginia Beach. I-464 heads north as a six-lane freeway that meets US 13 (Military Highway) at a diamond interchange and crosses over Norfolk Southern Railway's Norfolk District.

I-464 passes over US 460 and SR 166 (Bainbridge Boulevard) with no access; the connection is made indirectly through a diamond interchange with Freeman Avenue, which serves one of the industrial areas along the Southern Branch Elizabeth River. The Interstate parallels Bainbridge Boulevard north to a cloverleaf interchange with SR 337 (Poindexter Street), which leads to the recently replaced South Norfolk Jordan Bridge which provides alternate access to Portsmouth. I-464 crosses over another Norfolk Southern rail line at the boundary between Chesapeake and Norfolk and has a partial interchange with South Main Street before reaching its northern terminus at a directional interchange with I-264 in the Berkley neighborhood of Norfolk. The ramp from northbound I-464 to westbound I-264, which passes through a trench, also provides access to State Street and Berkley Avenue. Eastbound I-264 crosses the Eastern Branch Elizabeth River on the Berkley Bridge into Downtown Norfolk. Westbound I-264 passes under the Southern Branch via the Downtown Tunnel into the city of Portsmouth.

== History ==
Under the Fixing America's Surface Transportation Act (FAST Act), the US 17 corridor past the southern terminus is now designated part of the route of a Future I-87, which will eventually continue the freeway south into North Carolina, then follow the route of US 64 west to connect to I-95 in Rocky Mount and eventually to I-40 in Raleigh. This project will provide a critical southern freeway link between the Hampton Roads metropolitan area and North Carolina's Research Triangle. It could lead to this highway's future decommission.

== Exit list ==
County	Location	mi	km	Exit	Destinations	Notes
City of Chesapeake		0.00	0.00	15B	US 17 south / SR 168 south – Outer Banks, Elizabeth City	Southbound exit and northbound entrance; southern terminus; exit 15B is for US 17 south; uses SR 168's mileposts; future I-87
City of Chesapeake		0.15	0.24	1	I-64 / US 17 north – Virginia Beach, Suffolk, Richmond	I-64 exit 291; signed as exits 1A (Virginia Beach) and 1B (Suffolk/Richmond) southbound; cloverleaf interchange.
City of Chesapeake		0.79	1.27	2	US 13 (Military Highway)	
City of Chesapeake		1.85	2.98	3	To Freeman Avenue / US 460 / SR 166	
City of Chesapeake		3.47	5.58	4	SR 337 (Poindexter Street)	Signed as exits 4A (east) and 4B (west) northbound
City of Norfolk		4.91	7.90	5	South Main Street	Northbound exit and southbound entrance
City of Norfolk		5.67	9.12	6	I-264 – Downtown Norfolk, Downtown Tunnel, Portsmouth	Northern terminus; I-264 exit 8; signed as exits 6A (west) and 6B (east); tri-stack interchange.
1.000 mi = 1.609 km; 1.000 km = 0.621 mi
