= Chesapeake Regional Airport =

- IATA: QQP; ICAO: KCPK; FAA LID: CPK

Summary
- Airport type: Public
- Owner: Chesapeake Airport Authority
- Location: Chesapeake, Virginia
- Elevation AMSL: 19 ft (5.8 m)
- Coordinates: 36°39′56″N 076°19′14″W
- Website: ChesapeakeAirport.com

Map
- Location of airport in Virginia

Runways
| Direction | Length | | Surface |
| Direction | ft | m | Surface |
|---|---|---|---|
| 5/23 | 5,500 | 1,676 | Asphalt |

Statistics (2012)
- Aircraft operations: 35,361
- Based aircraft: 94
- Source: Federal Aviation Administration

Chesapeake Regional Airport (ICAO: KCPK, FAA LID: CPK) is a public use airport located in the city of Chesapeake, Virginia and serving the Hampton Roads area. The airport is 12 nautical miles (22 km) south of the central business district of Norfolk, Virginia. It is owned by the Chesapeake Airport Authority. Horizon Aviation is the FBO. Epix Aviation is also located on site.

Although most U.S. airports use the same three-letter location identifier for the FAA and IATA, this airport is assigned CPK by the FAA and QQP by the IATA.

== Facilities and aircraft ==
Chesapeake Regional Airport covers an area of 430 acres (170 ha) at an elevation of 19 feet (6 m) above mean sea level. It has one asphalt paved runway designated 5/23 which measures 5,500 by 100 feet (1,676 x 30 m).

For the 12-month period ending March 30, 2012, the airport had 35,361 aircraft operations, an average of 97 per day: 96% general aviation, 3% air taxi and 1% military. At that time there were 94 aircraft based at this airport: 84% single-engine, 9% multi-engine, 4% jet, 2% ultralight and 1% helicopter.
