= Virginia Beach Oceanfront =

Boardwalk in Virginia Beach, Virginia, United States

Coordinates: 36.8425°N 75.9725°W

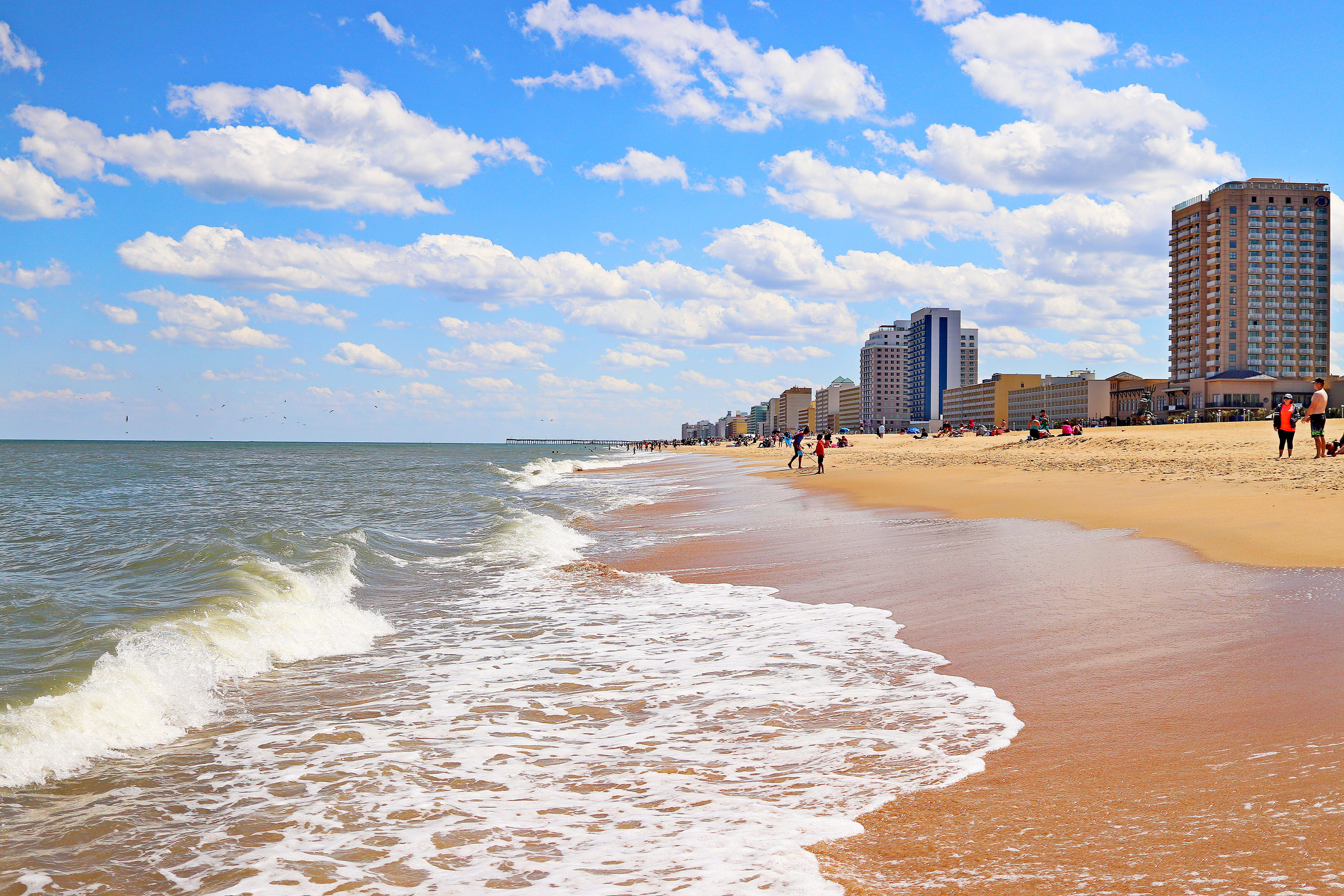
Virginia Beach Oceanfront

Virginia Beach Oceanfront refers to the three mile (4.8 km) long (8.2 m [27 ft] wide) boardwalk and North End residential areas in eastern Virginia Beach on the Atlantic Coast. It is located North of the Rudee Inlet Bridge and directly southeast of First Landing State Park, which includes pathways of the boardwalk itself, Atlantic Avenue, and Pacific Avenue. Virginia Beach is a resort city, and the Oceanfront is a primary tourist attraction. The boardwalk, substantially updated in 1988, is a concrete path linking forty hotels and other attractions via pedestrian walkway and separated bike path -- which in turn connects to nearby trails and surface streets.

== History ==
With the construction of a rail system in 1883 tourism in Virginia Beach began to grow. Soon after the Virginia Beach Hotel opened, offering the first overnight accommodations. More tourists began to spend their summers in Virginia Beach along the shore, and construction began on the boardwalk in 1888. First constructed of wooden planks, the walk extended five blocks. During the Gilded Age the boardwalk was run next to Peacock Ballroom, where artists including Duke Ellington, Cab Calloway, and Tommy Dorsey performed. By the early 1900s, Virginia Beach had become a well-known vacation destination. In 1927, The Cavalier opened, as Virginia Beach’s first grand hotel. The Cavalier eventually hosted to 7 US Presidents: Calvin Coolidge, Herbert Hoover, Harry Truman, Dwight Eisenhower, John F. Kennedy, Lyndon Johnson and Richard Nixon. The hotel attracted celebrities including, F. Scott Fitzgerald, Bette Davis, Jean Harlow, Judy Garland, Will Rogers and Fatty Arbuckle. During the 1930s through the 1950s the Cavalier hosted widely popular big bands including Frank Sinatra, Bing Crosby, Benny Goodman, Tommy Dorsey, Glenn Miller, Xavier Cugat, Cab Calloway and Lawrence Welk.

== Features ==
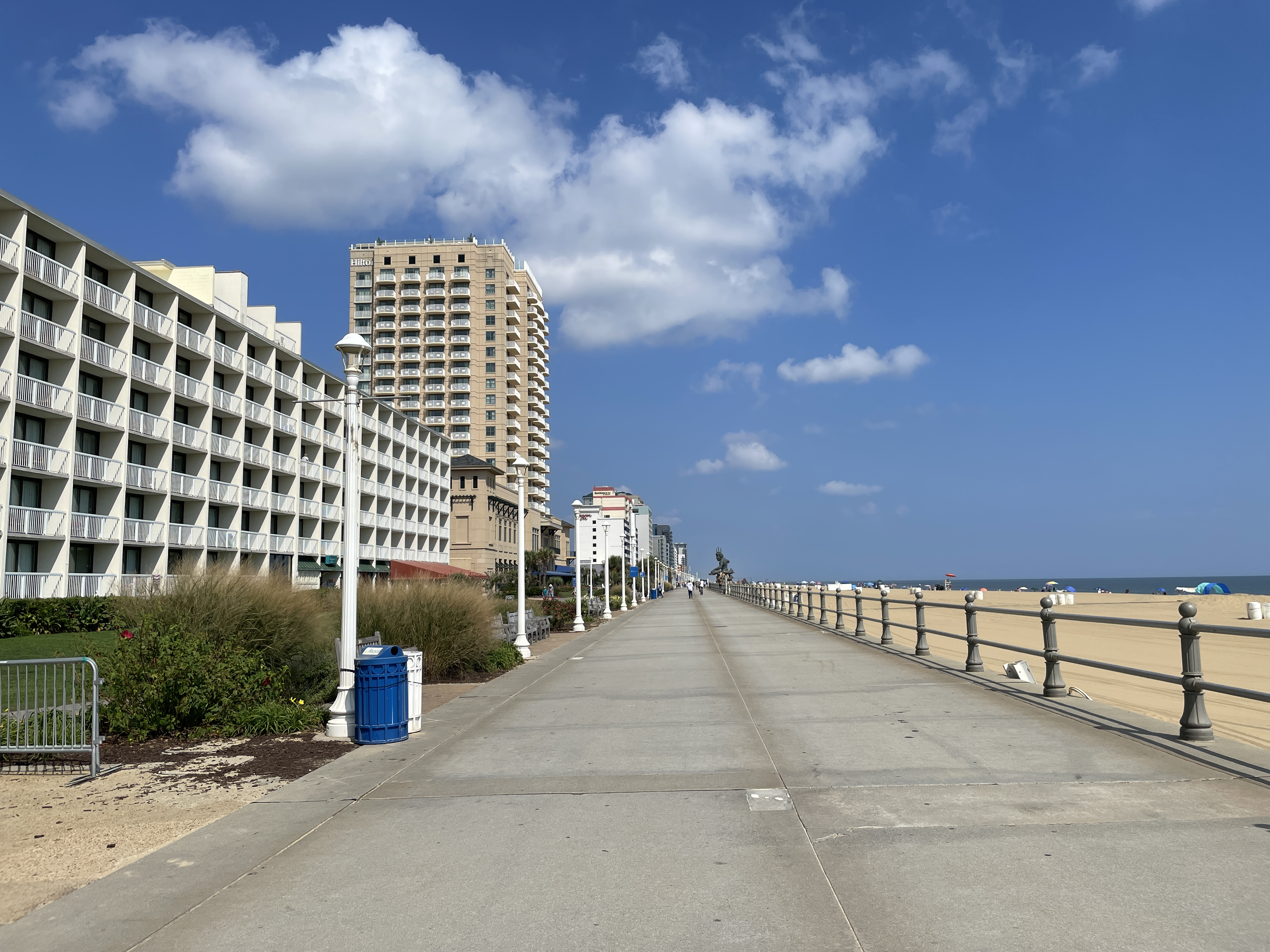
Boardwalk in Virginia Beach

The oceanfront features many monuments to Virginians who have impacted the history of the state. Some of the monuments are located at the Naval Aviation Monument Park which was formally dedicated on May 6, 2006, by the Hampton Roads Squadron of the Naval Aviation Foundation Association. Planned since 1997 in partnership with the City of Virginia Beach, the park features heroic-scale statuary and reliefs to tell the history of Naval Aviation. The Virginia Legends Walk features famous historical Virginians such as Pocahontas, Edgar Allan Poe and George Washington. Many other monuments are scattered between hotels. A main monument is the statue of King Neptune - a colossal 34-foot-high bronze statue that rises from the sand at 31st Street & Atlantic Avenue, overlooking Neptune Park. Other attractions include various forms of artwork between hotels and other buildings. Many are sculptures including different starfish, dolphins, and sea turtles painted in many colors for people's viewing pleasure.

Public path leading to the North End beach.

North of the boardwalk begins North End neighborhood from 43rd - 89th streets. The North End beach is accessible from the ends of numbered streets by walkways, some of which provide stairs across the dunes and handicapped-accessible ramps.

== Entertainment ==
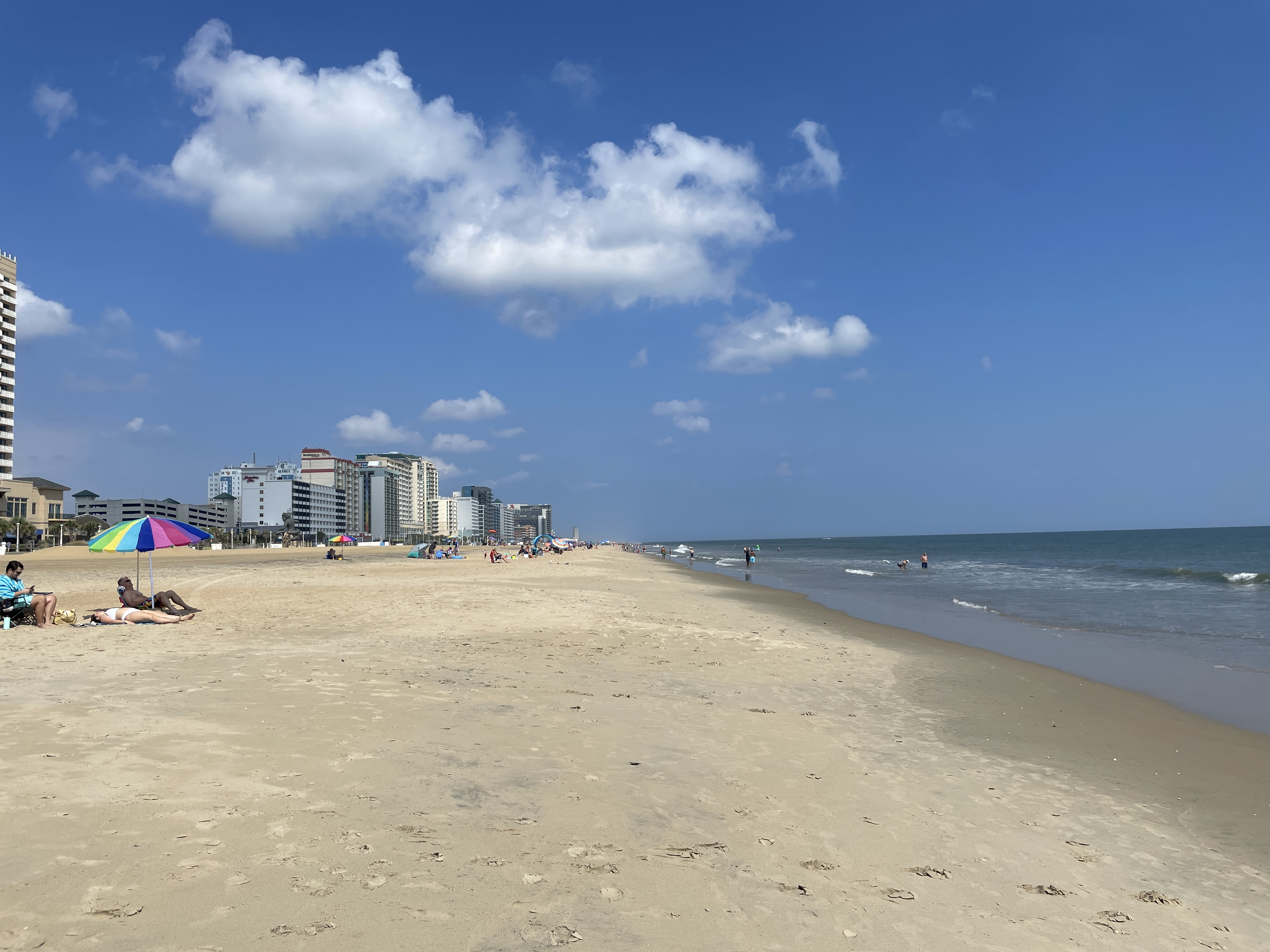
A view of the beach at 29th Street

The Virginia Beach Oceanfront is home to Beach Street USA which lines up entertainment events during the summer months for tourists. Most events are free and include local and visiting performers from magic shows and musical talents, to psychics and palm readers. Some events do cost money, though. One of the most well known events at the ocean front hosted by Beach Street USA is McDonald's Holiday Lights at the Beach where guests can sit in their car and drive along the boardwalk to view many different holiday light setups. There are bikes for individuals and families for rent all summer which are accommodated on a bike path that stretches the entirety of the boardwalk. There are over forty hotels which are interspersed between small restaurants, photo studios, and other random shops. Night clubs are also in abundance on both Atlantic and Pacific Avenue. Another big tourist attraction at the Oceanfront is the 14th Street Fishing Pier. It is one of many fishing piers located in the state of Virginia, and the only pier accessible from the boardwalk.

== Awards ==
The Virginia Beach Boardwalk was noted as one of America's favorite boardwalks by the Discovery Channel and as a destination by magazines such as Coastal Living, Southern Living, and National Geographic Traveler.
