= Eastern Branch Elizabeth River =

Coordinates: 36°50′20″N 76°15′38″W

Location
- Country: United States

Physical characteristics
- Source
  - location: Virginia

The Eastern Branch Elizabeth River is a 9.0-mile-long (14.5 km) tidal river in the Hampton Roads area of the U.S. state of Virginia. The river flows from east to west, starting in Virginia Beach. At its crossing by Interstate 64 it becomes the boundary between Virginia Beach and the city of Norfolk, and farther west it is the boundary between Norfolk and the city of Chesapeake. For its final 3 miles (5 km) it is entirely within the city of Norfolk.

== See also ==
- List of rivers of Virginia
