= Virginia State Route 192 =

State highway in the City of Norfolk, Virginia, US

State Route 192
- Azalea Garden Road

Route information
- Maintained by VDOT
- Length: 2.02 mi (3.25 km)
- Existed: 1952–present

Major junctions
- South end: SR 165 in Norfolk
- North end: SR 170 in Norfolk

Location
- Country: United States
- State: Virginia
- Counties: City of Norfolk

Highway system
- Virginia Routes; Interstate; US; Primary; Secondary; Byways; History; HOT lanes
| ← SR 191 | → SR 193 |

State Route 192 (SR 192) is an unsigned primary state highway in the U.S. state of Virginia. Known as Azalea Garden Road, the state highway runs 2.02 miles (3.25 km) from SR 165 north to SR 170 within the independent city of Norfolk. SR 192 provides access to the Norfolk Botanical Garden.

== Route description ==
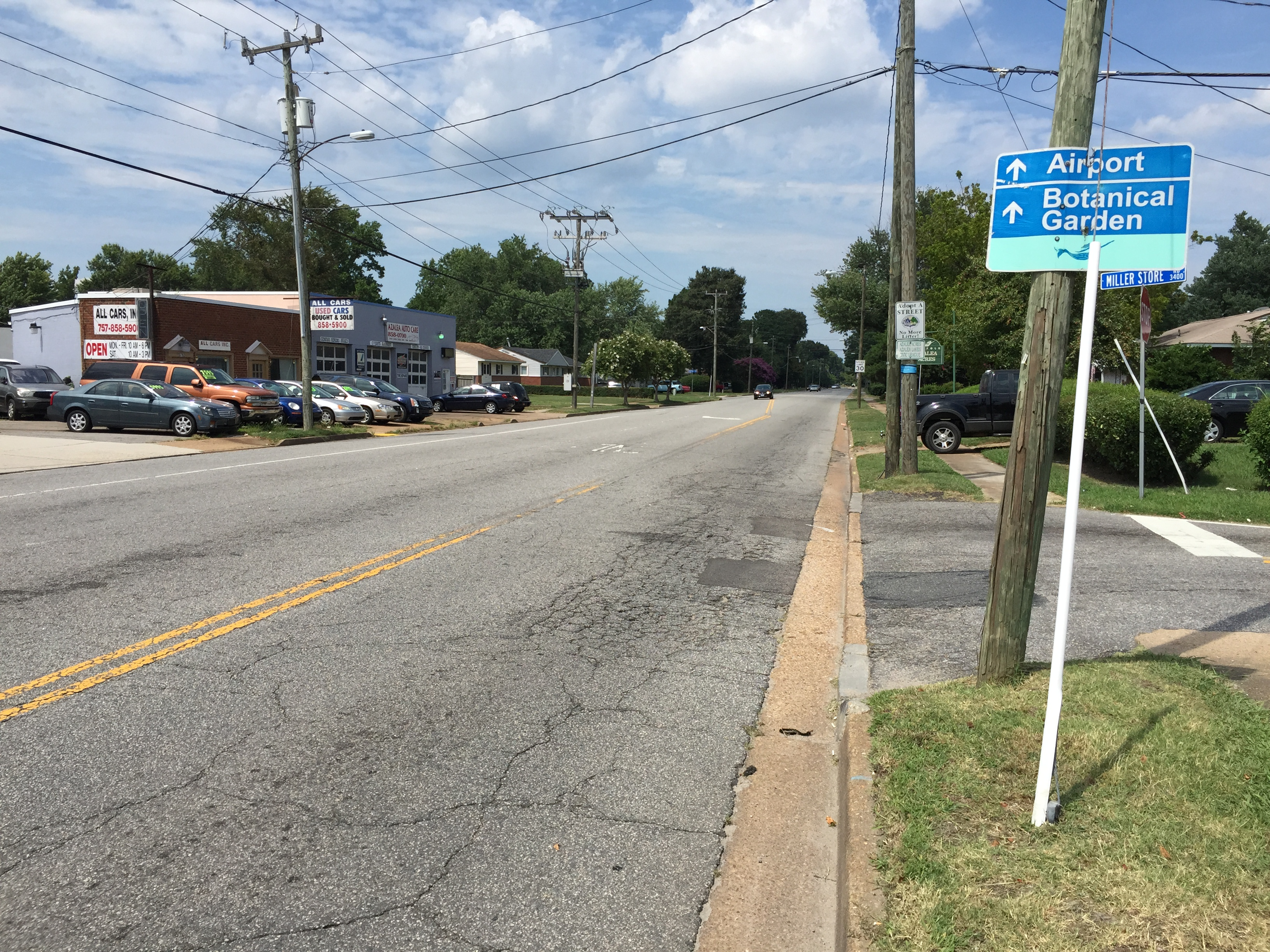
View north along SR 192 at SR 165 in Norfolk

SR 192 begins at an intersection with SR 165 (Military Highway) in the northeastern part of Norfolk. Azalea Garden Road continues southwest as an unnumbered street toward Downtown Norfolk, east of which the highway intersects SR 194, SR 166, and U.S. Route 58. SR 192 heads northeast as a four-lane undivided street through a densely populated residential area. The state highway crosses an arm of Lake Whitehurst before intersecting Norview Avenue, which heads east as the main entrance to Norfolk International Airport. SR 192 passes the entrance to the Norfolk Botanical Garden just before crossing another arm of the lake and veering north. The state highway reaches its northern terminus at SR 170 (Little Creek Road) west of Naval Amphibious Base Little Creek.

== Major intersections ==
The entire route is in Norfolk.

| mi | km | Destinations | Notes |
|---|---|---|---|
| 0.00 | 0.00 | SR 165 (North Military Highway) | Southern terminus |
| | | Norview Avenue to I-64 – Airport | |
| 2.02 | 3.25 | SR 170 (East Little Creek Road) | Northern terminus |
1.000 mi = 1.609 km; 1.000 km = 0.621 mi
