= Virginia Beach Boulevard =

Arterial road in southeastern Virginia

Virginia Beach Boulevard

Route information
- Maintained by Cities of Virginia Beach and Norfolk
- Length: 18.51 mi (29.79 km)
- Component highways: US 58; US 58 Bus.

Major junctions
- West end: W. Olney Rd., Norfolk
- US 460 (Church Street); US 13 (Military Highway); I-64 (Hampton Roads Beltway); SR 165 (Kempsville Rd.); SR 190 (Witchduck Rd.); SR 225 (Independence Blvd.); SR 279 (Great Neck Road); I-264
- East end: 17th Street & Baltic Ave., Virginia Beach Oceanfront

Location
- Country: United States

Highway system
- United States Numbered Highway System; List; Special; Divided

Virginia Beach Boulevard is a major connector highway which carries U.S. Route 58 most of its length and extends from the downtown area of Norfolk to the Oceanfront area of Virginia Beach, passing through the newly developed New Urbanist Town Center development of the latter as it links the two independent cities in the South Hampton Roads subregion of the Hampton Roads region in southeastern Virginia.

The first hard-surfaced road from Norfolk to Virginia Beach, Virginia Beach Boulevard opened in July 1921. "the Boulevard" as it became widely known locally, was a major factor in the growth of the Oceanfront town and adjacent portions of the former Princess Anne County (consolidated with Virginia Beach in 1963) as automobiles replaced streetcars and trains as a preferred mode of travel.

In the late 1950s, a former airfield near the intersection with Norfolk's semi-circumferential Military Highway became the site of JANAF, the largest shopping center in the eastern United States at the time. When indoor shopping malls became the newest trend a few decades later, Military Circle Mall was built in another quadrant of this major intersection. As traffic continued to grow, Virginia Beach Boulevard was largely paralleled by the Virginia Beach Expressway, a toll road which was completed in 1967. Originally designated Virginia State Route 44, after the toll revenue bonds were retired, it became toll-free and was re-designated as part of Interstate 264. However, "the Boulevard" continues to serve in many ways as Virginia Beach's equivalent of "Main Street" in the early 21st century.

== History ==
Prior to the late 19th century, the Atlantic Ocean frontage of Princess Anne County from Cape Henry south to North Carolina was isolated, subject to severe weather, and largely uninhabited. When the resort development of the resort area near Seatack (now known commonly as the "Oceanfront") area of Princess Anne County began in the 1880s, travelers were largely dependent upon steam-powered railroad and later electric trolley service from Norfolk to reach the new Princess Anne Hotel and the others which soon followed, provided by Norfolk Southern Railway and its predecessor companies. A line parallel to the beach extended north to Cape Henry, and Pullman car service was offered to the original landmark brick Cavalier Hotel, which attracted many affluent tourists.

In the early 20th century, rubber-tired motor vehicles emerged as preferred mode of travel for Americans, offering more personalized transportation for vacationers. Virginia Beach Boulevard was established in 1922 as a concrete roadway extending from the eastern outskirts of the City of Norfolk through formerly rural sections of Norfolk County and Princess Anne County to the reach the developing Oceanfront area. The new roadway provided a major avenue of access by automobiles, buses, and trucks to the resort strip, and the areas along the route.

Over the years, Virginia Beach Boulevard was extended further into Norfolk, and widened. Service roads were built along both sides. After World War II, huge shopping complexes, JANAF Shopping Center, and Military Circle Mall were established near the junction with Military Highway. Further east, Pembroke Mall was built. Gradually, the former farmlands of the two counties gave way to development, and eventually expansion of the independent cities through annexations and consolidations brought the borders of the cities of Virginia Beach and Norfolk together on Virginia Beach Boulevard, near Newtown Road.

Along with a more circuitous route along U.S. Route 60 which, as Ocean View Avenue and Shore Drive, looped along from Willoughby Spit along the south shore of the Chesapeake Bay past Cape Henry to reach the Oceanfront area, Virginia Beach Boulevard (designated as U.S. Route 58) served as the primary access route to the Oceanfront area until the largely parallel Virginia Beach Expressway (now I-264) was opened as a toll road in 1967.

== Route ==
In modern times, Virginia Beach Boulevard remains one of the major traffic arteries and commercial corridors of the City of Virginia Beach, passing through the New Urbanist Town Center development in the Pembroke area at Independence Boulevard. Today, almost the entire length of the Boulevard is signed U.S. Route 58. The exception is its easternmost section, just east of Great Neck Road (State Route 279). Here, Laskin Road splits from the Boulevard and takes the Route 58 designation while Virginia Beach Boulevard becomes Business U.S. Route 58, a designation it holds until Virginia Beach Boulevard ends at Atlantic Avenue. The Virginia Beach Boulevard designation once ended several blocks before the oceanfront and the road continued as 17th Street until its physical terminus at Atlantic Avenue, but the Virginia Beach Boulevard designation has now been extended for the entire length, replacing 17th Street. (The iconic 17th Street Surf Shop has an address on Pacific Avenue.)

The only Hampton Roads Transit bus route serving Virginia Beach Boulevard is Route 20, one of the busiest routes and longest route in the region which runs from Downtown Norfolk to Virginia Beach Oceanfront. It serves Military Circle Mall, Newtown Road, Virginia Beach Town Center, Pembroke Mall, Thalia, Lynnhaven, London Bridge, Oceana, Laskin Road, and the Virginia Beach Oceanfront, terminating at Arctic Avenue and 19th Street.

== Major intersections ==
County	Location	mi	km	Destinations	Notes
City of Virginia Beach		0.0	0.0	US 60 (Pacific Avenue)	Eastern terminus of US 58 Bus.
City of Virginia Beach		2.30	3.70	SR 615 (First Colonial Road)	
City of Virginia Beach		3.97	6.39	US 58 west / I-264 west (Virginia Beach/Norfolk Expressway) – Norfolk	Westbound access only; western terminus of US 58 west
City of Virginia Beach		3.97	6.39	US 58 Bus. (Virginia Beach Boulevard) / US 58 east (Laskin Road)	Virginia Beach Boulevard continues as US 58 Bus.; US 58 turns onto Laskin Road
City of Virginia Beach		4.11	6.61	SR 279 (North Great Neck Road)	
City of Virginia Beach		4.19	6.74	Lynnhaven Parkway South	Formerly SR 414, designation removed January 2001
City of Virginia Beach		6.19	9.96	South Rosemont Road	Formerly SR 411; designation removed January 2001
City of Virginia Beach		9.13	14.69	SR 225 (Independence Boulevard)	
City of Virginia Beach		10.24	16.48	SR 190 (Witchduck Road)	
City of Virginia Beach		11.57	18.62	SR 403 south (Newtown Road)	
City of Norfolk		12.50	20.12	SR 165 (Kempsville Road)	
City of Norfolk		13.29	21.39	US 13 (Military Highway)	Single-point urban interchange
City of Norfolk		15.52	24.98	SR 405 south (Ballentine Boulevard)	
City of Norfolk		16.48	26.52	SR 166 (Park Avenue)	
City of Norfolk		17.01	27.37	SR 168 (Tidewater Drive)	Semi-roundabout interchange
City of Norfolk		17.71	28.50	US 58 east / US 460 (Church Street)	Western end of US 58 concurrency; US 58 continues south on Church Street
City of Norfolk		17.90	28.81	West Olney Road	Western terminus
1.000 mi = 1.609 km; 1.000 km = 0.621 mi: Incomplete access; Route transition
