= JANAF Shopping Center =

Coordinates: 36°51′31″N 76°12′21.2″W

JANAF Shopping Yard
- Location: Norfolk, Virginia
- Address: Intersection of Virginia Beach Boulevard & Military Highway
- Opened: 1959
- Manager: Wheeler Real Estate Company; Leasing managed by Wheeler Real Estate Company
- Owner: WHLR Real Estate Investment Trust
- Num. of stores: 147
- Num. of anchor tenants: 5
- Floor area: 1,000,000 square feet (93,000 m^{2})
- Public transit: Virginia Beach & Military; HRT Bus Route 20
- Website: http://janafshopping.com/

The JANAF Shopping Yard, commonly known as JANAF, is a suburban shopping center located in Norfolk, Virginia. Opening in 1959, it was one of the first large suburban shopping centers in the United States. The name is an acronym for Joint Army Navy Air Force, which refers to the original investment group that was composed of retired and active duty military personnel.

JANAF was built at the north-east corner of Military Highway and Virginia Beach Boulevard on property which had formerly been used as an airfield. It occupies more than 80 acres and encompasses more than 880,000 SF. It is across Virginia Beach Boulevard from Military Circle Mall, an indoor mall built in 1970.

On July 19, 2016, it was announced that the owner of the McKinley, Inc was placing the shopping center up for sale. CBRE Hampton Roads will represent the owner in sales negotiations.

Wheeler Real Estate Investment Trust Inc., a company with a primary focus on grocery-anchored centers, said January 22, 2018, that WHLR-JANAF LLC, a wholly owned subsidiary of the firm, has purchased JANAF Shopping Yard shopping center in Norfolk for $85.6 million. At 887,917 square-feet, JANAF is the largest open-air shopping center in the region. According to CBRE broker Ryan Sciullo who, along with Bill Kent, handled the sale, the transaction represents the largest non-mall retail sale in Hampton Roads in the past five years.
