= Virginia State Route 406 =

State highway in Norfolk, Virginia, US

State Route 406
- International Terminal Boulevard

Route information
- Maintained by VDOT and City of Norfolk
- Length: 1.61 mi (2.59 km)
- Existed: early 1980s–present

Major junctions
- West end: SR 337 in Norfolk
- East end: I-564 in Norfolk

Location
- Country: United States
- State: Virginia
- Counties: City of Norfolk

Highway system
- Virginia Routes; Interstate; US; Primary; Secondary; Byways; History; HOT lanes
← SR 405	→ SR 407

State Route 406 (SR 406) is a primary state highway in the U.S. state of Virginia. Known as International Terminal Boulevard, the state highway runs 1.61 miles (2.59 km) from SR 337 east to Interstate 564 (I-564) within the city of Norfolk. SR 406 provides a direct connection from the Interstate Highway System to Norfolk International Terminals, an international port facility owned by the Virginia Port Authority that is accessed at the highway's western terminus. The state highway also provides access to portions of the Norfolk Naval Station, whose reservation's southern boundary follows the highway. SR 406 is part of the National Highway System for its entire length due to its role as a facilitator of intermodal freight transport.

== Route description ==
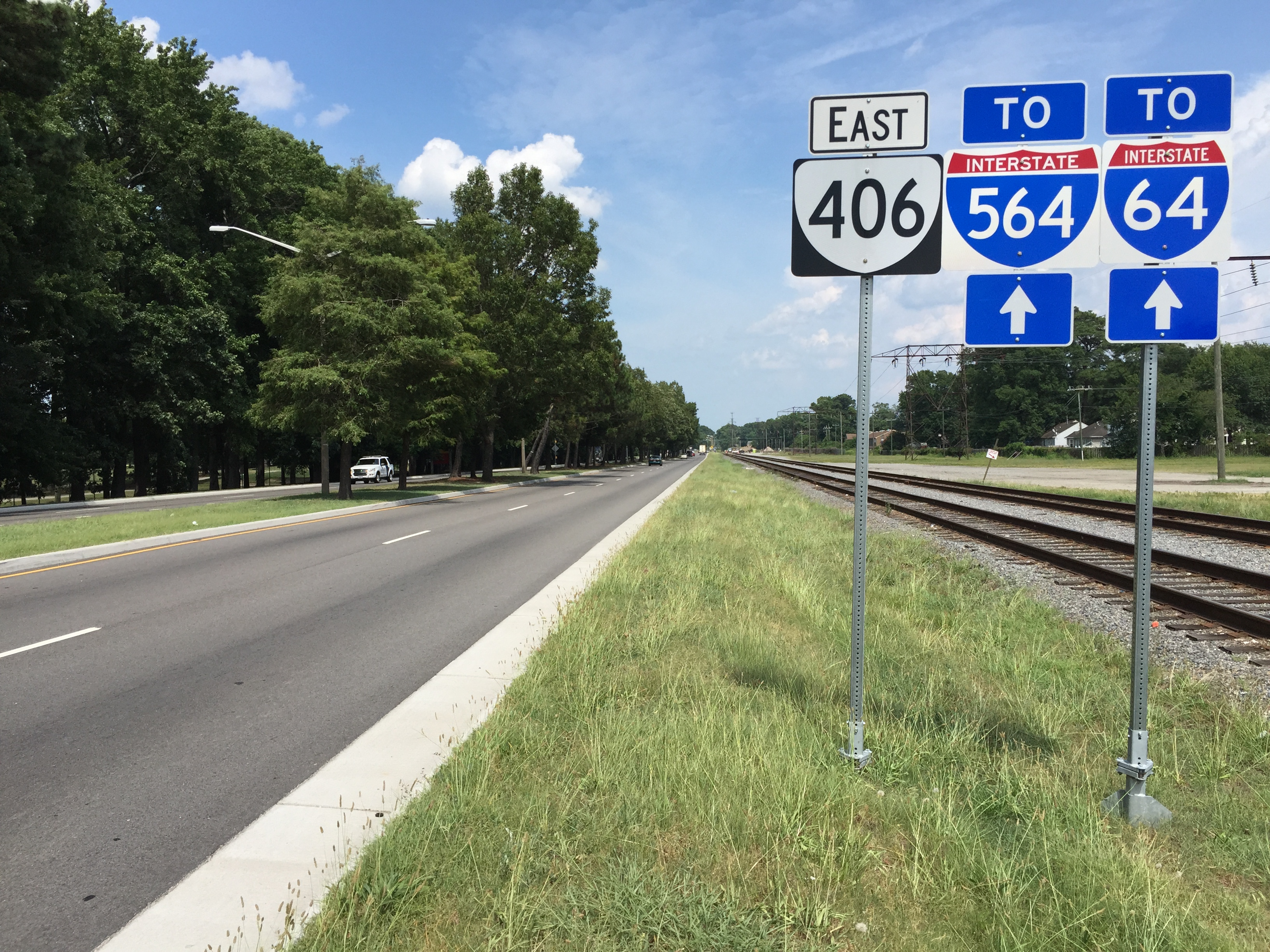
View east along SR 406 at Diven Street in Norfolk

SR 406 begins at a signalized intersection with SR 337 (Hampton Boulevard). SR 337 heads north onto the grounds of the Norfolk Naval Station and south toward Downtown Norfolk. The west leg of the intersection is the entrance to the Norfolk International Terminals. The intersection is bisected by a Norfolk Southern Railway rail line that requires all traffic at the intersection to stop when a train passes through the intersection on its way to or from the port facility. SR 406 heads east as a four-lane divided highway, passing between the rail line to the south and the naval reservation to the north. The state highway has intersections with Meredith Street, Diven Street, and Ruthven Road; the first two streets head north onto the naval reservation. Both Diven Street and Ruthven Road connect SR 406 with SR 170 (Little Creek Road), which parallels SR 406 several blocks to the south. Ruthven Road also provides access to the Sewells Point Golf Course and serves as the dividing line between City of Norfolk maintenance to the west and Virginia Department of Transportation maintenance to the east. A short distance east of Ruthven Road, SR 406 reaches its eastern terminus at a partial interchange with I-564 (Admiral Taussig Boulevard). The interchange, which includes bridges over the wye junction of the rail line to Norfolk International Terminals and the rail spur that serves the naval base, features a loop ramp from northbound I-564 to westbound SR 406 and a standard ramp from eastbound SR 406 to southbound I-564 that splits shortly after joining I-564's alignment, providing access to both directions of I-64 (Hampton Roads Beltway) and US 460 (Granby Street).

== Major intersections ==
The entire route is in Norfolk.

mi	km	Destinations	Notes
0.00	0.00	SR 337 (Hampton Boulevard) / Norfolk International Terminals – Downtown Norfolk, Naval Base	Western terminus
1.61	2.59	I-564 south (Admiral Taussig Boulevard) to I-64 (Hampton Roads Beltway) / US 460 (Granby Street) – Virginia Beach, Hampton	Northbound exit from and southbound entrance to I-564; eastern terminus
1.000 mi = 1.609 km; 1.000 km = 0.621 mi: Incomplete access
