= VA247 =

VA247 may refer to:

- Ariane flight VA247, an Ariane 5 launch that occurred on 5 February 2019
- Virgin Australia flight 247, with IATA flight number VA247
- Virginia State Route 247 (VA-247), a primary state highway in the United States
