= Virginia State Route 170 =

State highway in Virginia, United States

State Route 170
- Little Creek Road

Route information
- Maintained by VDOT
- Length: 2.65 mi (4.26 km)
- Existed: 1957–present

Major junctions
- West end: SR 165 in Norfolk
- East end: US 60 in Norfolk

Location
- Country: United States
- State: Virginia
- Counties: City of Norfolk

Highway system
- Virginia Routes; Interstate; US; Primary; Secondary; Byways; History; HOT lanes
← SR 169	→ SR 171

State Route 170 (SR 170) is a primary state highway in the U.S. state of Virginia. Known as Little Creek Road, the state highway runs 2.65 miles (4.26 km) from SR 165 east to U.S. Route 60 (US 60) within the independent city of Norfolk. SR 170 is the eastern part of the connection between Naval Station Norfolk and Naval Amphibious Base Little Creek.

== Route description ==
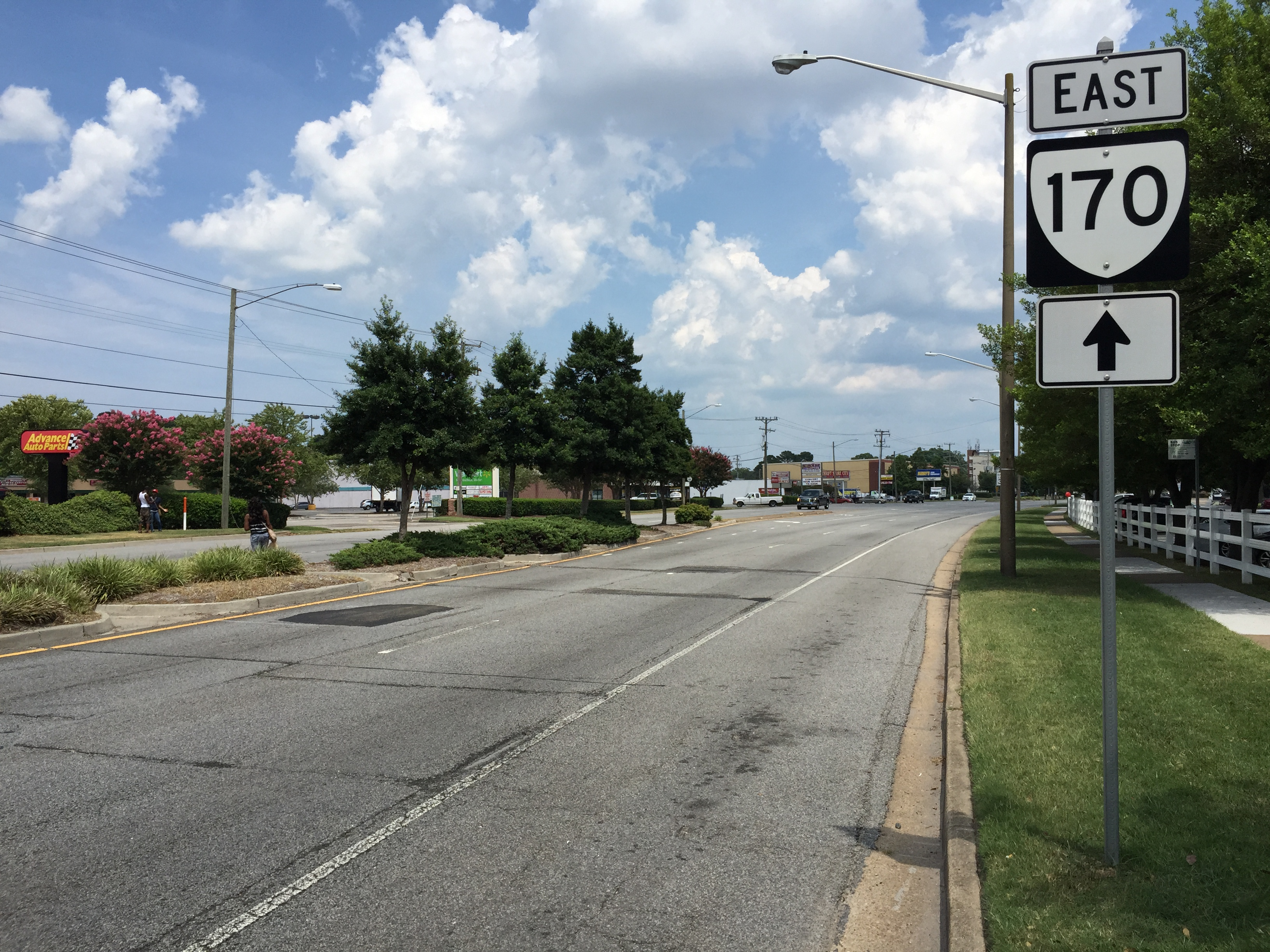
View east along SR 170 at Meadow Creek Road in Norfolk

SR 170 begins at a directional intersection with SR 165, which heads west as Little Creek Road toward Naval Station Norfolk and south as Military Highway. The state highway heads east as a five-lane road with a center left-turn lane through a densely populated area of the northeastern part of Norfolk. At Meadow Creek Road, SR 170 becomes a divided highway and intersects the northern terminus of SR 192 (Azalea Garden Road). The state highway reaches its eastern terminus at US 60 (Shore Drive) adjacent to Naval Amphibious Base Little Creek and the boundary between the cities of Norfolk and Virginia Beach. The roadway continues east as Midway Road onto the amphibious base.

== History ==
Little Creek Road east of Granby Street (then SR 170, now US 460) was added to the state highway system in 1942 as State Route 351, at the same time as the eastern half of Military Highway was added; this route connected the Military Highway bypass with several military installations. By 1947, SR 168 was extended from Newport News over the ferry to Sewell's Point, replacing SR 165 on Admiral Taussig Boulevard (now mostly Interstate 564) and the majority of SR 351, from Taussig Boulevard east to US 60. The small piece of SR 351 west of Taussig Boulevard became a realigned SR 165; SR 351 was entirely eliminated (and immediately reused at its current location to replace part of former SR 168).

SR 168 was realigned to use the newly opened Hampton Roads Bridge–Tunnel in late 1957, and it took over the former SR 170 through Norfolk to North Carolina. Thus the State Route 170 designation was freed for a renumbering of the former SR 168 in Norfolk, from Hampton Boulevard (SR 337) near the old ferry southeast on Taussig Boulevard and east on Little Creek Road to US 60. In 1979, I-564 replaced most of the Taussig Boulevard piece of SR 170, and the rest became an extension of SR 337; thus SR 170 was truncated to its current length by also removing the SR 165 concurrency.

== Major intersections ==
The entire route is in Norfolk.

mi	km	Destinations	Notes
0.00	0.00	SR 165 (East Little Creek Road / North Military Highway) to US 13	Western terminus
1.56	2.51	SR 192 south (Azalea Garden Road) - Botanical Garden, Airport	Northern terminus of SR 192
2.65	4.26	US 60 (Shore Drive)	Eastern terminus
1.000 mi = 1.609 km; 1.000 km = 0.621 mi
