= London Bridge, Virginia =

London Bridge
- Unincorporated community
- Location within the Commonwealth of Virginia London Bridge (the United States)
- Coordinates: 36°50′31″N 76°2′59″W
- Country: United States
- State: Virginia
- Independent city: Virginia Beach
- Time zone: UTC−5 (Eastern (EST))
  - Summer (DST): UTC−4 (EDT)
- ZIP codes: 23454
- Area codes: 757, 948

London Bridge is an unincorporated community within the independent city of Virginia Beach, Virginia, United States. It is located in the area of Great Neck Road and Virginia Beach Boulevard, where Laskin Road begins.

London Bridge was a town with its own post office in operation when it was still a part of Princess Anne County prior to the county's consolidation with Virginia Beach by mutual agreement in 1963. The post office at London Bridge was located in London Mews, now Chambord Commons in what is now known as the Le Chambord Restaurant.

The actual bridge is on Virginia Beach Blvd., which was the site of a trading post owned and operated by the London Company, and crosses London Bridge creek, a part of the Lynnhaven River, that heads at the Lynnhaven Bay.
