= Fred Heutte =

- Born: March 9, 1899; Paris, France
- Died: July 29, 1979 (aged 79); Norfolk, Virginia
- Resting place: St. Mary's Catholic Cemetery; 36.8744°N 76.2811°W
- Occupations: Superintendent, Norfolk Department of Parks
- Years active: 1937 - 1966
- Employer: City of Norfolk
- Known for: Norfolk Botanical Garden

Frederic Heutte (March 19, 1899–1979) was a leading writer, gardener and horticulturist in Norfolk, Virginia.

== Biography ==
Frederic Heutte was born in Paris in 1899 to a French father and American mother and moved to the United States, settling in Summit, New Jersey in 1912. He got his start in horticulture working for a florist in New York City. In 1917, he joined the army and was charged with protecting the Panama Canal. In Panama, he planted hibiscus and was regularly given tasks as the "company gardener." After the war, he got a job as a gardener in a Staten Island Hospital and took night courses to finish his high school education. He went from estate to estate as a gardener, learning horticulture until 1936.

Heutte became head of Norfolk Parks in 1937, and became a leading advocate for the beautification of the Tidewater Virginia city through its landscaping. In 1938, Heutte and Norfolk City Manager Thomas P. Thompson were granted 75 acres (300,000 m^{2}) of high, wooded ground plus 75 acres (300,000 m^{2}) of reservoir for a city garden. Later that year, under a Works Progress Administration (WPA) grant, 200 African-American women and 20 men cleared the site. By March 1939, 4,000 azaleas, 2,000 rhododendrons, several thousand miscellaneous shrubs and trees, and 100 bushels of daffodils had been planted and another grant was quickly secured to expand the garden. The garden has the distinction of being the only botanical garden that surrounds a municipal airport. Later, Norfolk International Airport became a national model for reconciling the landscape and commercial aviation.

He wrote Fred Heutte's Gardening in the Temperate Zone in 1977, dedicated to his wife Florence. The book details monthly garden duties for a Tidewater garden, as well as favorite plants for the climate. Trademarks of his work are the camellia, azalea and crape myrtle. His favorite was the crape myrtle, as it bloomed the longest in the Norfolk climate.

== Death and legacy ==
Heutte's wishes for enriching the Norfolk community are preserved by volunteers of The Friends of Fred Heutte Foundation in Norfolk, Virginia, who have worked since 1970 to share his ideals of urban beautification through horticultural education and to maintain the Ferry Terminal Building and its display gardens which surround the building that is located in Ghent Square.
