= Virginia State Route 279 =

State highway in the City of Virginia Beach, Virginia, US

State Route 279
- Great Neck Road

Route information
- Maintained by VDOT
- Length: 5.55 mi (8.93 km)
- Existed: c. 1980–present

Major junctions
- South end: US 58 in Virginia Beach
- North end: US 60 in Virginia Beach

Location
- Country: United States
- State: Virginia
- Counties: City of Virginia Beach

Highway system
- Virginia Routes; Interstate; US; Primary; Secondary; Byways; History; HOT lanes
← SR 278	→ SR 280

State Route 279 (SR 279) is a primary state highway in the U.S. state of Virginia. Known as Great Neck Road, the state highway runs 5.55 miles (8.93 km) from U.S. Route 58 (US 58) north to US 60 within the independent city of Virginia Beach.

== Route description ==
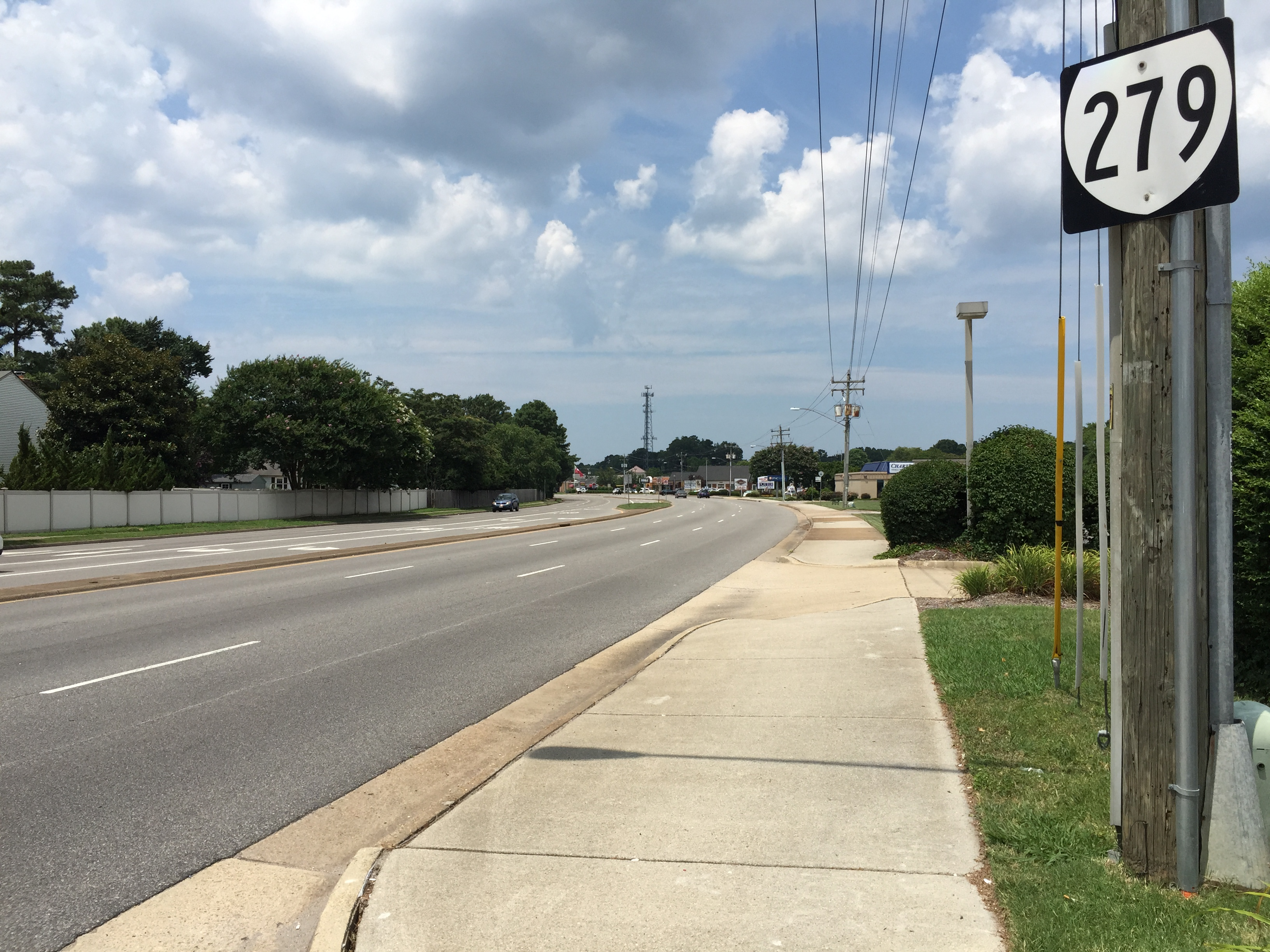
View north along SR 279 at First Colonial Road in Virginia Beach

SR 279 begins at an intersection with US 58 (Virginia Beach Boulevard), just north of Interstate 264 in the London Bridge area of Virginia Beach. The roadway continues south as London Bridge Road, along the western edge of Naval Air Station Oceana. The state highway heads north as a four-lane divided highway that crosses Wolfsnare Creek, a tributary of the Lynnhaven River. SR 279 passes between multiple residential subdivisions and meets the northern end of First Colonial Road on the Great Neck peninsula, which lies between the Lynnhaven River to the west and Broad Bay and its tributaries to the east. At the northern end of the peninsula, the state highway crosses over a pair of water links between Broad Bay and the Lynnhaven River and over Bay Island, which is accessed via the highway's old alignment, West Great Neck Road, to the west. SR 279 enters a commercial area and reaches its northern terminus at US 60 (Shore Drive) two blocks south of the Chesapeake Bay shoreline.

== Major intersections ==
The entire route is in Virginia Beach.

mi	km	Destinations	Notes
0.00	0.00	US 58 (Virginia Beach Boulevard) to London Bridge Road / I-264	Southern terminus
		First Colonial Road	former SR 408 south
5.55	8.93	US 60 (Shore Drive) – Chesapeake Bay Bridge-Tunnel	Northern terminus
1.000 mi = 1.609 km; 1.000 km = 0.621 mi
