= Virginia State Route 278 =

State highway in the City of Hampton, Virginia, US

State Route 278
- King Street

Route information
- Maintained by VDOT
- Length: 1.64 mi (2.64 km)
- Existed: 1942–present

Major junctions
- South end: US 258 in Hampton
- North end: Langley AFB entrance

Location
- Country: United States
- State: Virginia
- Counties: City of Hampton

Highway system
- Virginia Routes; Interstate; US; Primary; Secondary; Byways; History; HOT lanes
← SR 277	→ SR 279

State Route 278 (SR 278) is a primary state highway in the U.S. state of Virginia. Known as King Street, the state highway runs 1.64 miles (2.64 km) from U.S. Route 258 (US 258) north to an entrance to Langley Air Force Base within the independent city of Hampton.

== Route description ==
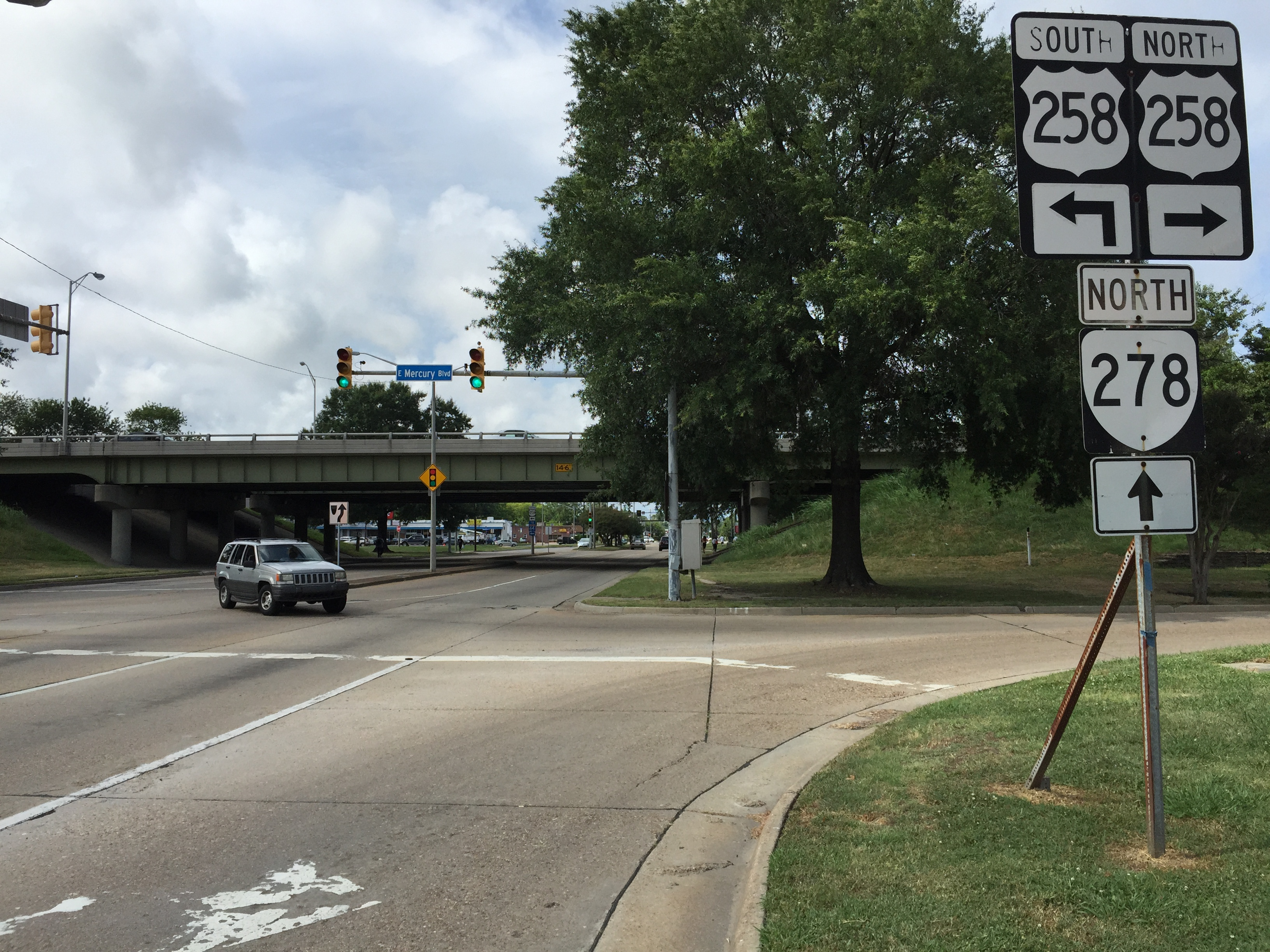
View north at the south end of SR 278 at US 258 in Hampton

SR 278 begins at a diamond interchange with US 258 (Mercury Boulevard). King Street continues south as an unnumbered street toward downtown Hampton. The state highway heads north as a five-lane road with a center left-turn lane through a residential area. SR 278 loses the center turn lane at Little Back River Road and becomes two lanes at Lamington Road. The state highway gains an additional lane northbound before reaching its northern terminus at a gate for Langley Air Force Base. North of the gate, the roadway crosses the Back River to reach the main body of the military installation.

== Major intersections ==
The entire route is in Hampton.

mi	km	Destinations	Notes
0.00	0.00	US 258 (East Mercury Boulevard) to I-64	Diamond interchange; southern terminus
1.64	2.64	Langley Air Force Base	Northern terminus
1.000 mi = 1.609 km; 1.000 km = 0.621 mi
