= Virginia State Route 194 =

State highway in Virginia, United States

State Route 194

Route information
- Maintained by VDOT
- Length: 5.75 mi (9.25 km)
- Existed: 1947–present

Major junctions
- South end: SR 166 in Norfolk
- I-64 in Norfolk
- North end: US 60 in Norfolk

Location
- Country: United States
- State: Virginia
- Counties: City of Norfolk

Highway system
- Virginia Routes; Interstate; US; Primary; Secondary; Byways; History; HOT lanes
| ← SR 193 | → I-195 |

State Route 194 (SR 194) is a primary state highway in Virginia, United States. The road runs 5.75 miles (9.25 km) within the independent city of Norfolk, from state route SR 166 northwards to U.S. Route 60. SR 194 is a major north–south thoroughfare in the eastern part of Norfolk.

== Route description ==
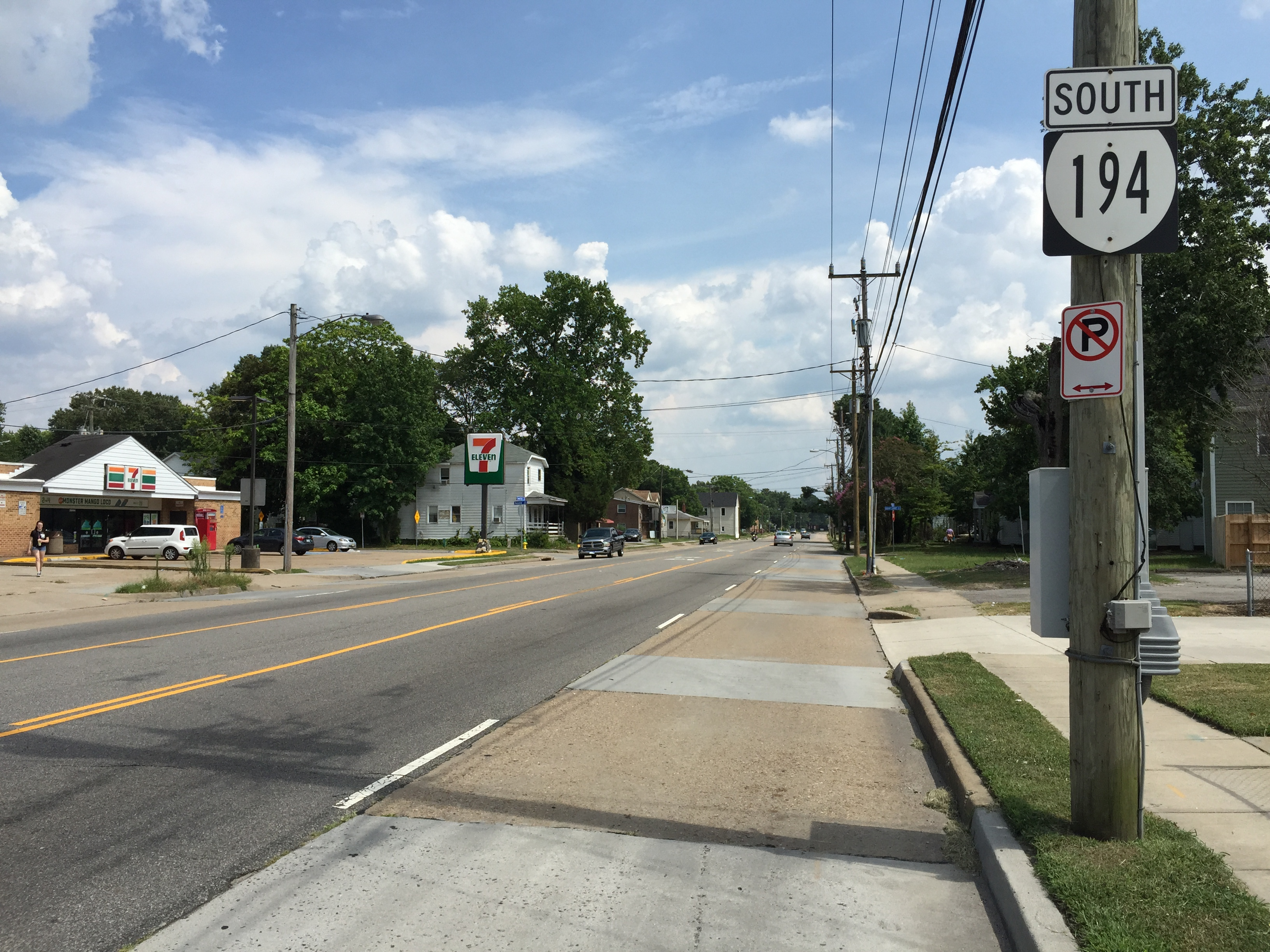
View south along SR 194 at SR 247 in Norfolk

SR 194 begins at an intersection with SR 166 (Princess Anne Road) east of Downtown Norfolk and north of Norfolk Industrial Park. The state highway heads north as two-lane undivided Sewells Point Road. North of a grade crossing of a Norfolk Southern rail line, SR 194 expands to a five-lane road with a center left-turn lane at Azalea Garden Road. The state highway passes through the Elmhurst neighborhood to a six-way intersection with Norview Avenue and Chesapeake Boulevard. SR 247 heads southwest as Chesapeake Boulevard and east as Norview Avenue; westbound Norview Avenue and northbound Sewells Point Road are unnumbered streets. SR 194 continues north through the Norview neighborhood on Chesapeake Boulevard, a six-lane divided highway.

North of Norview High School, SR 194 has a partial cloverleaf interchange with I-64 (Hampton Roads Beltway) that only contains ramps in the northeast and southwest quadrants of the interchange. Northbound SR 194 has an exit ramp to and an entrance ramp from westbound I-64. Southbound SR 194 has an exit ramp to and an entrance ramp from eastbound I-64. The missing connections with I-64 are made via SR 247 to the south and SR 165 (Little Creek Road) to the north of the Interstate. North of SR 165, SR 194 becomes a four-lane divided highway north to its terminus at US 60 (Ocean View Avenue) in the Ocean View neighborhood of Norfolk.

== Major intersections ==
The entire route is in Norfolk.

| mi | km | Destinations | Notes |
|---|---|---|---|
| 0.00 | 0.00 | SR 166 (Princess Anne Road) | Southern terminus |
| 1.63 | 2.62 | SR 247 (Chesapeake Boulevard / Norview Avenue) to I-64 east | |
| 2.50 | 4.02 | I-64 west | I-64 exit 268; northbound exit and southbound entrance |
| 2.50 | 4.02 | I-64 east | I-64 exit 268; southbound exit and northbound entrance |
| 3.35 | 5.39 | SR 165 (Little Creek Road) | |
| 5.75 | 9.25 | US 60 (East Ocean View Avenue) | Northern terminus |
1.000 mi = 1.609 km; 1.000 km = 0.621 mi: Incomplete access
