= Virginia State Route 247 =

State highway in the City of Norfolk, Virginia, US

State Route 247

Route information
- Maintained by City of Norfolk
- Length: 5.31 mi (8.55 km)
- Existed: 1959–present

Major junctions
- West end: SR 337 in Norfolk
- US 460 in Norfolk; I-64 in Norfolk
- East end: SR 165 in Norfolk

Location
- Country: United States
- State: Virginia
- Counties: City of Norfolk

Highway system
- Virginia Routes; Interstate; US; Primary; Secondary; Byways; History; HOT lanes
| ← SR 246 | → SR 249 |

State Route 247 (SR 247) is a primary state highway in the U.S. state of Virginia. The state highway runs 5.31 miles (8.55 km) from SR 337 east to SR 165 within the independent city of Norfolk. SR 247 is a major east–west thoroughfare that connects U.S. Route 460 (US 460) and Interstate 64 (I-64) with Norfolk International Airport.

== Route description ==
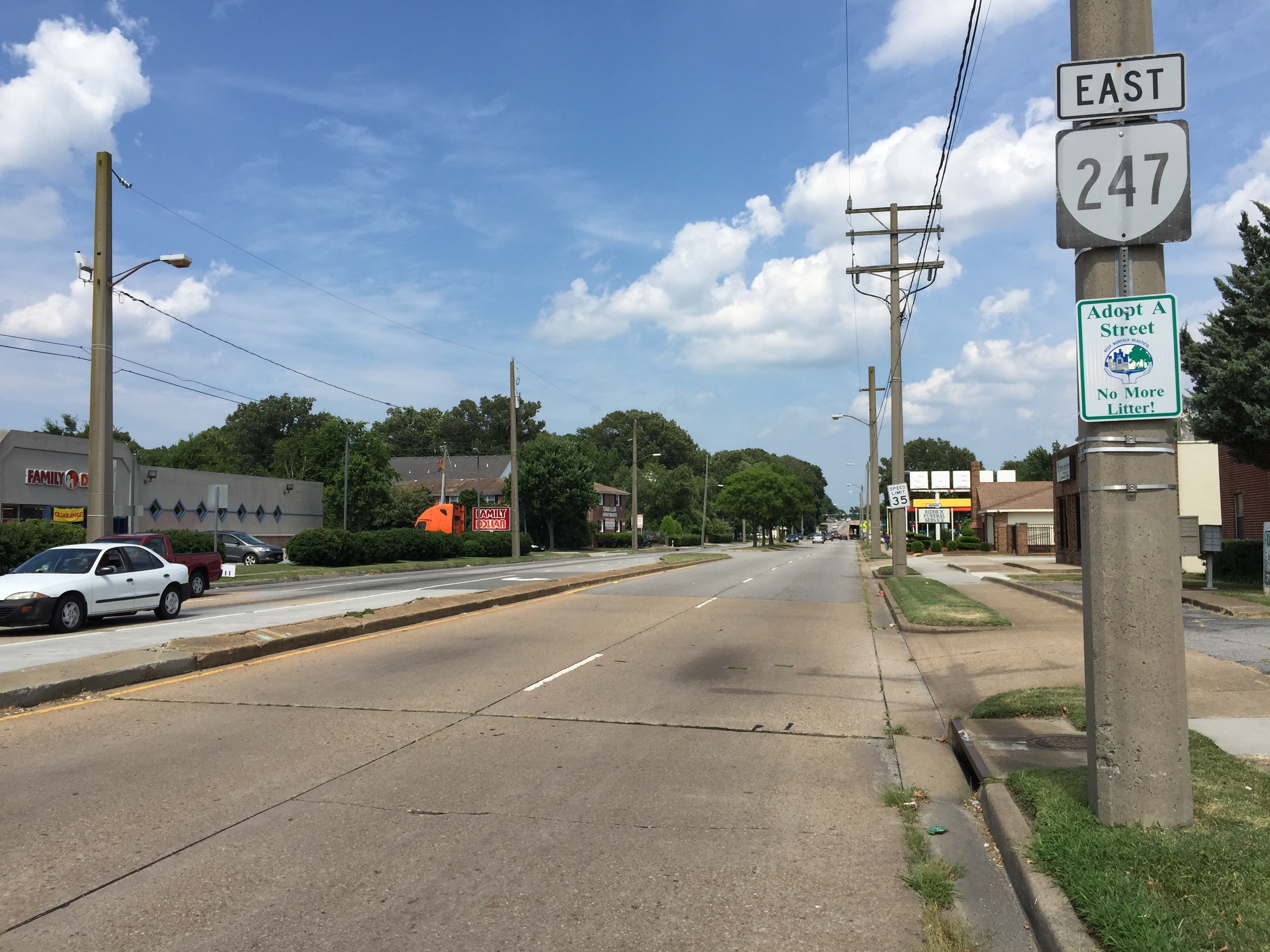
View east along SR 247 at SR 194 in Norfolk

SR 247 begins at a pair of intersections with SR 337 (Hampton Boulevard) south of Old Dominion University and three blocks north of the Norfolk Southern Railway tracks to Lambert's Point. The state highway heads east as a one-way pair of three-lane streets—26th Street eastbound and 27th Street westbound—through the Park Place neighborhood. SR 247 intersects north–south thoroughfares Colley Avenue, Colonial Avenue, Llewellyn Avenue, and Monticello Avenue before curving slightly to the northeast at US 460 (Granby Avenue). Three blocks east of US 460, 26th and 27th Streets combine into four-lane undivided Lafayette Boulevard, which crosses the Lafayette River and becomes a divided highway east of the bridge. SR 247 veers north, curves back east, and intersects SR 168 (Tidewater Drive). The state highway continues east as an undivided highway to a five-leg roundabout with Chesapeake Boulevard and Ballentine Boulevard.

SR 247 continues northeast from the roundabout along Chesapeake Boulevard, a four-lane divided highway, through a grade crossing of Norfolk Southern's rail line toward Sewell's Point. The state highway follows Chesapeake Boulevard to a six-way intersection with Norview Avenue and Sewells Point Road. SR 194 heads south as Sewells Point Road and north as Chesapeake Boulevard; westbound Norview Avenue and northbound Sewells Point Road are unnumbered streets. SR 247 continues east along four-lane divided Norview Avenue. The state highway meets I-64 (Hampton Roads Beltway) at a partial cloverleaf interchange. SR 247 reaches its eastern terminus at its intersection with SR 165 (Military Highway). Norview Avenue continues east as an unnumbered boulevard that serves as the main entrance to Norfolk International Airport.

== Major intersections ==
The entire route is in Norfolk.

| mi | km | Destinations | Notes |
|---|---|---|---|
| 0.00 | 0.00 | SR 337 (Hampton Boulevard) – Tunnel to Portsmouth | Western terminus |
| 1.13 | 1.82 | US 460 (Church Street) | |
| 2.41 | 3.88 | SR 168 (Tidewater Drive) | |
| 4.41 | 7.10 | SR 194 (Chesapeake Boulevard / Sewells Point Road) to Norview Avenue west / I-64 | |
| 4.70 | 7.56 | I-64 – Hampton, Richmond, Virginia Beach, Chesapeake | Exit 279 (I-64) |
| 5.31 | 8.55 | SR 165 (North Military Highway) / Norview Avenue – Airport | Eastern terminus |
1.000 mi = 1.609 km; 1.000 km = 0.621 mi
