= Interstate 564 =

Highway in Virginia

Interstate 564
- Admiral Taussig Boulevard
- I-564 highlighted in red

Route information
- Auxiliary route of I-64
- Maintained by VDOT
- Length: 3.03 mi (4.88 km)
- Existed: mid-1970s–present
- NHS: Entire route

Major junctions
- West end: SR 337 in Norfolk
- SR 406 in Norfolk; US 460 / SR 165 in Norfolk
- East end: I-64 in Norfolk

Location
- Country: United States
- State: Virginia
- Counties: City of Norfolk

Highway system
- Interstate Highway System; Main; Auxiliary; Suffixed; Business; Future; Virginia Routes; Interstate; US; Primary; Secondary; Byways; History; HOT lanes
← US 522	→ I-581

Interstate 564 (I-564) is an Interstate Highway in the US state of Virginia. Known as Admiral Taussig Boulevard, after US Navy Rear Admiral Edward D. Taussig, the Interstate runs 3.03 miles (4.88 km) from State Route 337 (SR 337) east to I-64 within the city of Norfolk. I-564 is the primary access highway to Naval Station Norfolk, the world's largest naval base. The Interstate also links I-64 with Norfolk International Terminals via SR 406 and the Wards Corner area of Norfolk through connections with U.S. Route 460 (US 460) and SR 165.

== Route description ==
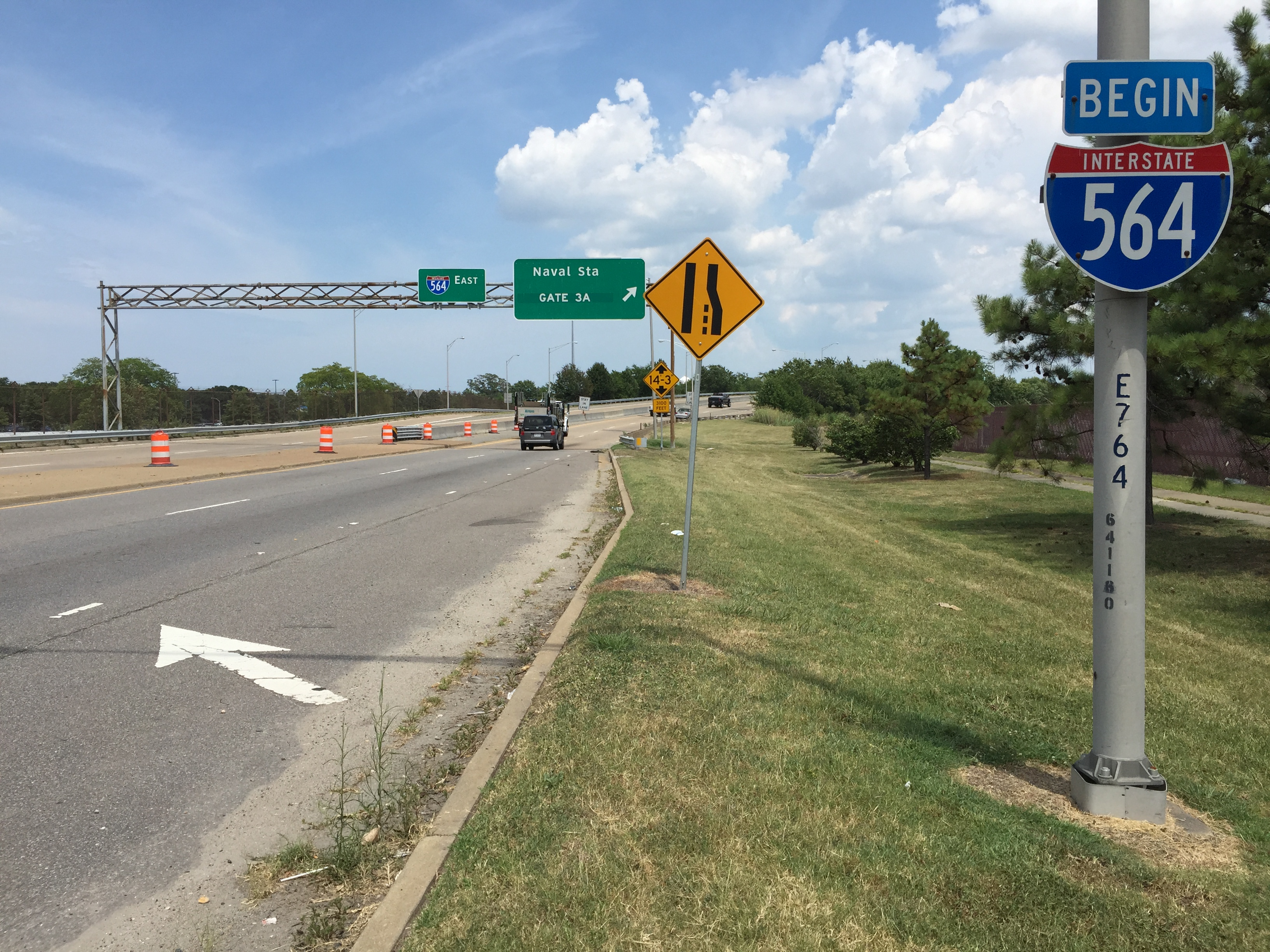
View east at the west end of I-564 at SR 337 in Norfolk

I-564 begins within the reservation of Naval Station Norfolk where Admiral Taussig Boulevard becomes a four-lane freeway; this point is also the eastern terminus of SR 337. The boulevard continues west as a four-lane divided highway to its intersection with Hampton Boulevard at naval station gates 1 and 2, where SR 337 turns south onto Hampton Boulevard toward Downtown Norfolk. I-564 curves southeast through a trumpet interchange with the access road to gates 3 and 3A. The ramps to and from the interchange join the Interstate to form a six-lane freeway. I-564 descends into a tunnel to pass under the east–west runway of Chambers Field, a naval air station that has been consolidated with the larger naval base.

East of the tunnel, I-564 heads southeast parallel to a rail line between the naval air station to the north and Camp Allen, a US Marine Corps base, to the south. The Interstate has a partial interchange with SR 406 (International Terminal Boulevard) that allows access to the highway to Norfolk International Terminals to and from the east. Within the interchange, eastbound I-564 has an exit for westbound I-64 (Hampton Roads Beltway) and US 460 (Granby Street). As I-564 crosses over US 460, the eastbound freeway has a left exit to and the westbound Interstate has a left entrance from I-64's reversible HOV lanes. Eastbound I-564 has an exit for SR 165 (Little Creek Road), which leads to SR 170, before the four-lane freeway merges into I-64 in the direction of Virginia Beach.

== History ==
I-564 replaced former SR 170, which linked Norfolk to northeastern North Carolina via North Carolina Highway 170. West of I-564, original SR 170 crossed a ferry to Hampton Roads, where it headed west along current I-64 to SR 30 northwest of Williamsburg.

== Future ==
Long-range plans may extend I-564 westward to Hampton/Newport News via a new bridge–tunnel. Traffic demands are increasing on I-64 and I-664. These are the only two connections between the eastern Tidewater cities with those to the northwest. The metropolitan area sees over 1.5 million people. Therefore, extending I-564 would provide needed relief if the present bridges and tunnels are not expanded from their current capacity.

== Exit list ==
All exits were unnumbered until 2018 when the Virginia Department of Transportation (VDOT) added exit numbers as part of the VDOT's I-564 Intermodal Connector project that started back in 2015. The entire route is in Norfolk.

mi	km	Exit	Destinations	Notes
0.00	0.00		SR 337 / to Hampton Boulevard – Naval Station Piers, Gates 1, 2 & 5	Western terminus; eastern terminus of SR 337
0.39	0.63	–	Naval Station Gates 3A & 3	
2.23	3.59	1	NIT North Gate / Hampton Blvd / Truck Inspection / NAVSTA Norfolk Gates 5 & 6	Westbound exit and eastbound entrance
2.23	3.59	2	SR 406 (Terminal Boulevard) / to Hampton Boulevard (SR 337)	Westbound exit and eastbound entrance. Eastern terminus of SR 406
2.23	3.59	3A	I-64 west / US 460 (Granby Street) – Hampton	Eastbound exit and westbound entrance; I-64 exit 276
2.90	4.67	3B	SR 165 (Little Creek Road) to SR 170	Eastbound exit and westbound entrance
3.03	4.88	–	I-64 east – Virginia Beach, Norfolk International Airport	Eastern terminus; I-64 exit 276B; eastbound exit and westbound entrance
1.000 mi = 1.609 km; 1.000 km = 0.621 mi: Incomplete access
