= Military Circle Mall =

Abandoned shopping mall in Virginia, United States

Coordinates: 36.852°N 76.206°W

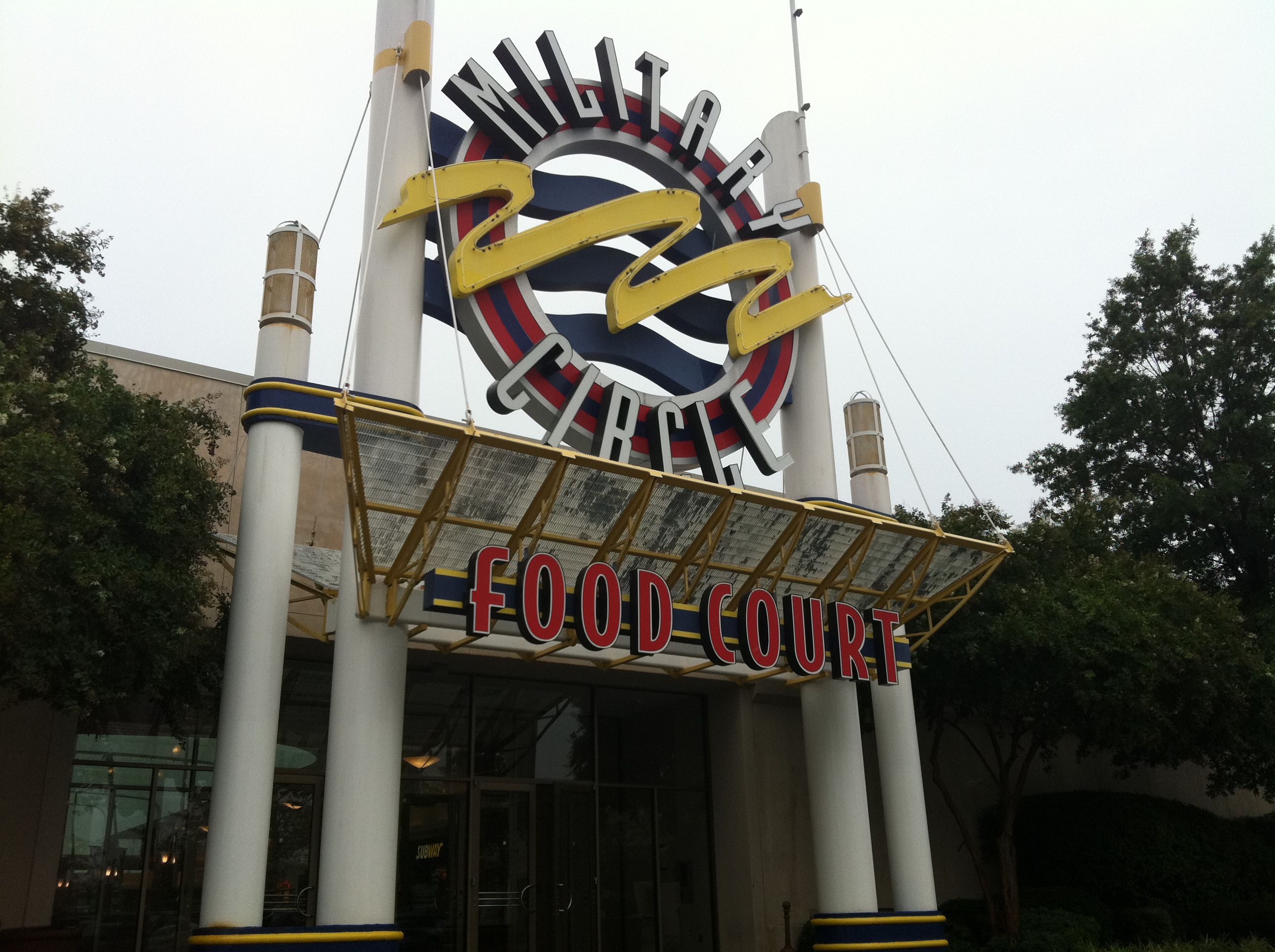
- Entrance to food court at Military Circle Mall, July 2011
- Location: Norfolk, Virginia, United States
- Address: 880 N. Military Hwy.
- Opened: 1970; 56 years ago
- Closed: January 31, 2023; 3 years ago
- Developer: The Rouse Company; Harvey Lindsay Commercial Real Estate
- Manager: The Woodmont Company
- Owner: Torchlight Investors
- Num. of stores: 65
- Num. of anchor tenants: 6 (3 open, other 3 vacant)
- Floor area: 963,000 sq ft (89,500 m^{2}) (GLA)
- Floors: 1

Military Circle Mall, known as The Gallery at Military Circle Mall from 2002 to 2015, is a soon to be demolished abandoned enclosed shopping mall in Norfolk, Virginia. The mall opened in 1970. In October 2016, the Virginia Beach City Council rejected plans for an oceanfront arena. This vote triggered discussions for the Military Circle area to include the construction of a 20,000 seat multi purpose arena. However, rising city debt and other priorities appear to negate any near-term plans for a new arena to the area. The anchor stores are Ross Dress for Less, Optima Health, and Movement Mortgage. There are 3 vacant anchor stores that were once Cinemark, Sears, and Macy's.

== History ==
Military Circle Mall opened in 1970, developed by The Rouse Company through its subsidiary, Rouse-Military Circle, Inc. and Harvey Lindsay Jr. Original tenants included J.B. Hunter (later Thalhimers), JCPenney, Smith & Welton, and Leggett (a division of Belk), a Sheraton hotel, and a 6-screen AMC Theatres multiplex. Thalhimer's became Hecht's in 1992, and Macy's in 2006. Smith & Welton closed in 1990. Renovations in 1996 included the addition of skylights in the concourses, new entrances and a 600-seat food court. AMC Theatres, located in the middle of the mall, closed in the mid-90s; a Cinemark multiplex opened a few years later in a different section of the mall.

In 1998, Belk vacated the former Leggett building. A year later, then-owner Urban Retail began a renovation of the center, which included the addition of a Sears in the former Smith & Welton space, returning Sears to Norfolk after its previous store in the city closed in 1993. In 2000, an 18-screen Cinemark movie theater also opened on the site of the former Leggett/Belk. Thor Equities bought the mall in 2002 and renamed it The Gallery at Military Circle while continuing mall-wide renovation. Ross Dress for Less opened in 2004, taking space previously occupied by a McCrory dime store. KB Toys filed for bankruptcy and closed in 2009, followed soon by the closing of Suncoast, and Waldenbooks stores.

Sears closed its Military Circle store on March 28, 2012 as part of a nationwide series of closings. The JCPenney store at Military Circle was named as one of 33 stores JCPenney announced on January 15, 2014, would close later in the year. The Norfolk Economic Development Authority then bought the vacated anchor that December so the city would have a strategic say in the future of the mall property. The Macy's store closed in early 2016.

On April 16, 2015, it was announced that the entire Gallery at Military Circle property was placed under foreclosure. On July 15, 2015, the entire mall property was put up for public auction in the Norfolk court. However, the mall did not change hands. On January 7, 2016; Macy's announced they were closing the Gallery at Military Circle location and many other locations as part of a massive restructuring; one of three in the Hampton Roads region and one of 40 overall closed in early 2016.

In February 2021, it was announced that the Cinemark 18 was now permanently closed. Signage was removed and a memorial for the theater was erected by former patrons in front of the theater. The mall permanently closed to the public on January 31, 2023.

In June 2026, the city of Norfolk has sought building contractors to lead the demolition of the mall.

In September 2026, demolition work on the mall was announced with demolition planned for 15 months.
