= Norfolk Botanical Garden =

Botanical garden in Norfolk, Virginia

- Norfolk Azalea Garden
- U.S. National Register of Historic Places
- Virginia Landmarks Register
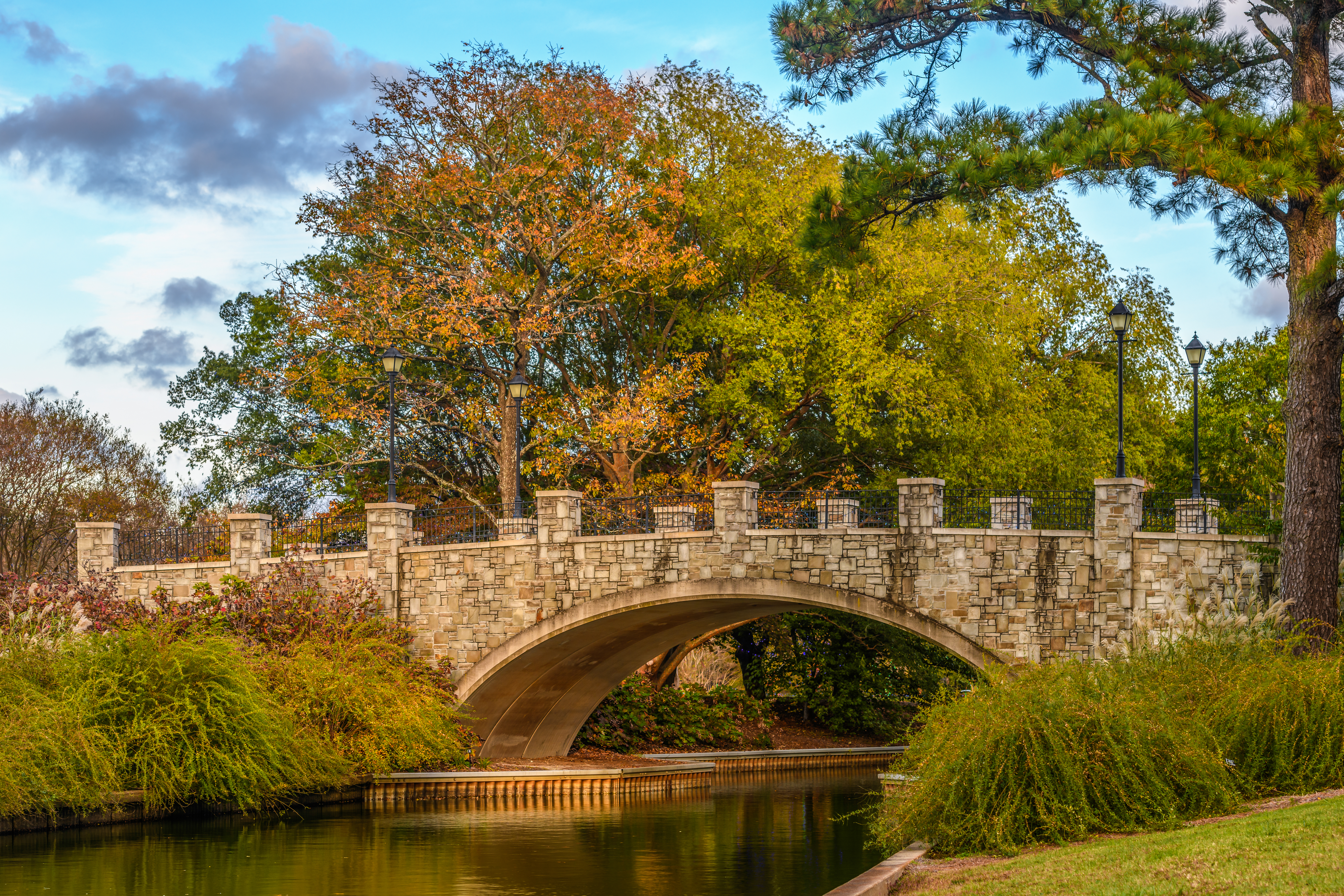
- Bridge at Norfolk Botanical Garden

- Location within Virginia Location within the United States
- Location: 6700 Azalea Garden Rd., Norfolk, Virginia
- Coordinates: 36°54′10″N 76°12′22″W
- Built: 1938
- Architect: City of Norfolk
- Architectural style: Naturalistic Landscape
- NRHP reference No.: 05000895
- VLR No.: 122-1007

Significant dates
- Added to NRHP: August 17, 2005
- Designated VLR: June 1, 2005

The Norfolk Botanical Garden (158 acres) is a botanical garden with arboretum located at 6700 Azalea Garden Road, Norfolk, Virginia.

== History ==
The Norfolk Botanical Garden was founded through the collaboration between Norfolk City Manager Thomas P. Thompson and horticulturalist Frederic Heutte. In 1938, the pair were granted 75 acres (300,000 m^{2}) of high, wooded ground plus 75 acres (300,000 m^{2}) of reservoir for a city garden. Later that year, under a Works Progress Administration (WPA) grant, 200 African-American women and 20 men cleared the site. By March 1939, 4,000 azaleas, 2,000 rhododendrons, several thousand miscellaneous shrubs and trees, and 100 bushels of daffodils had been planted. and another grant was quickly secured to expand the garden.

In 1958, the Old Dominion Horticultural Society took over maintenance and changed the garden's name to Norfolk Botanical Garden. The garden did at one point contain 175 acres, but the neighboring Norfolk International Airport expanded and took away 20 acres. A number of gardens were added through the 1950s and 1960s, including a Japanese garden, desert plants garden, colonial garden and rose garden. It was listed on the National Register of Historic Places in 2005.

== Gardens ==
The grounds include numerous theme gardens, including:

- All-American Selections Display Garden - features All-America Selections (AAS) of new annual varieties.
- Annette Kagan Healing Garden - medicinal plants, stream, and pools.
- Bicentennial Rose Garden (1976) - over 3,000 rose plants representing more than 430 varieties.
- Border Walk - traditional English-style border, with tulips, daffodils, pansies, as well as azaleas, hibiscus 'Diane', impatiens, petunias, and gomphrena.
- Bristow Butterfly Garden (2 acres) - a habitat for butterflies and moths.
- Colonial Herb Garden - American herb garden of the 18th and 19th centuries, hedged with boxwood.
- Conifer Garden - dwarf and large conifers, including arborvitae, cryptomeria, False Cypress, juniper, and spruce.
- Fern Glade - numerous fern species.
- Flowering Aboretum (17.5 acres) - a collection of 336 flowering trees.
- Four Seasons Garden and Wildflower Meadow (1994) - more than 50 wildflower species and 10 species of grasses.
- Fragrance Garden (1963) - fragrance plants, including bayberry, fringetree, lavender, osmanthus, peppermint, wintersweet, and fragrant flowering bulbs.
- Hofheimer Camellia Garden (1992) - one of the region's largest camellia collection; more than 500 varieties. Predominant types are varieties of Camellia japonica and C. sasanqua.
- Holly Garden & Turner Sculpture Garden (1950s, 3 acres) - evergreen hollies in garden "rooms". The garden contains 121 varieties of hollies, including more than 20 types of American and Asiatic hollies and a dozen English hollies are grouped by geographic regions.
- Japanese Garden (1962) - created to honor Norfolk's sister city, Moji, Japan, and rededicated in 1962 to Kitakyushu, formerly Moji; redesigned and refurbished in 1995.
- Kaufman Hydrangea Garden - nearly 200 varieties of hydrangea and close relatives.
- Matson Garden (0.25 acres) - large sweeps of perennials and smaller mixed groups.
- Mirror Lake (1939) - lake with paved trail and small woodland trails.
- NATO Overlook - view of garden, with redwoods and blue atlas cedars; named in honor of the nearby NATO installation.
- Norfolk International Airport Overlook - detailed map of Norfolk International Airport with a description of how planes work. Visitors can monitor airport ground communications.
- Purity Garden - Cataldi's sculpture of Madonna and Child, with backdrop of camellias.
- Renaissance Garden (1994) - patterned upon Italian Renaissance gardens of the late 16th century, with vista, terraces, stone fences, statues of the seasons, and reflective pool and fountain.
- Rhododendron Glade - more than 175 azalea and rhododendron varieties.
- Sarah Lee Baker Perennial Garden (1 acre) - more than 200 varieties of perennials, in a formal setting with limestone fountain and canals.
- Statuary Vista - eleven, seven-foot heroic sized statues carved from Carrara marble by Sir Moses Jacob Ezekiel in Rome, 1879–1884, for William Wilson Corcoran, founder of the Corcoran Gallery of Art in Washington, D.C. These statues were originally designed to be set in second-story niches in the Corcoran Gallery, and depict notable artists (Rembrandt, Rubens, Canova, Phidias, Murillo, Dürer, da Vinci, etc.).
- Sunken Garden (1963) - small pool with shade and sun plants.
- Tropical Garden - bananas, elephant ears, eucalyptus, gingers, etc.
- Virginia Native Plant Garden (6 acres) - four plant communities that once covered much of southeastern Virginia: bald cypress / tupelo swamp; bottomland hardwood forest; longleaf pine flatwoods; and Atlantic white cedar forest.
- Winter Garden - plants of winter interest.
- World of Wonders (3 acres) - for families and children.

== Tours offered ==
=== Tram ===
The tram starts behind the Baker Hall Visitor Center, in the designated tram circle. The tram tour takes approximately 25 minutes, and has nine stops around the garden. On weekdays during the designated tram season, the tram runs hourly from 10:00AM to 4:00PM daily. Private tours for larger groups can be booked by contacting the Visitor Services team. The tram is driven by a Garden Guide that will explain the different gardens passed by during the tour.

=== Rose Walking ===
This tour is an in depth view of the Bicentennial Rose Garden. It was completed in 1976 in honor of America's 200th birthday. Inside the 3.5 acres there are 3,000 individual rose bushes representing roughly 400 cultivars. It was previously one of 23 testing sites for the All-American Selection for roses (All American Rose Selection), and now it is a designated display site only.

=== Boat ===
A 45-minute tour that starts and end at the boat basin right behind Baker Hall and next to the Japanese Garden. The tour goes out onto Lake Whitehurst, where you learn about the lake and all the inhabitants and is offered seasonally from Memorial Day to Labor Day.

== Gallery ==
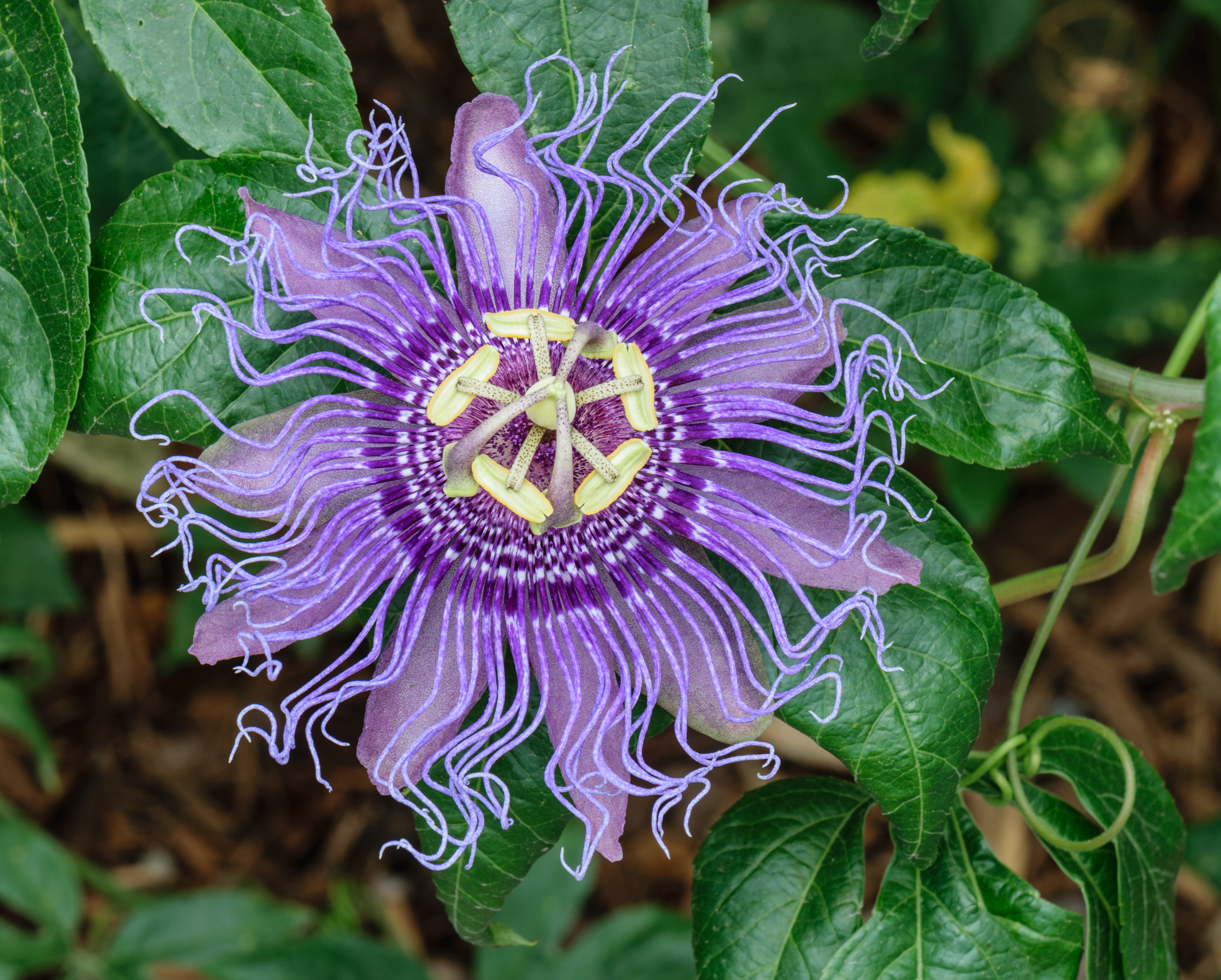
Passiflora incarnata (Passion Flower) in the Butterfly House

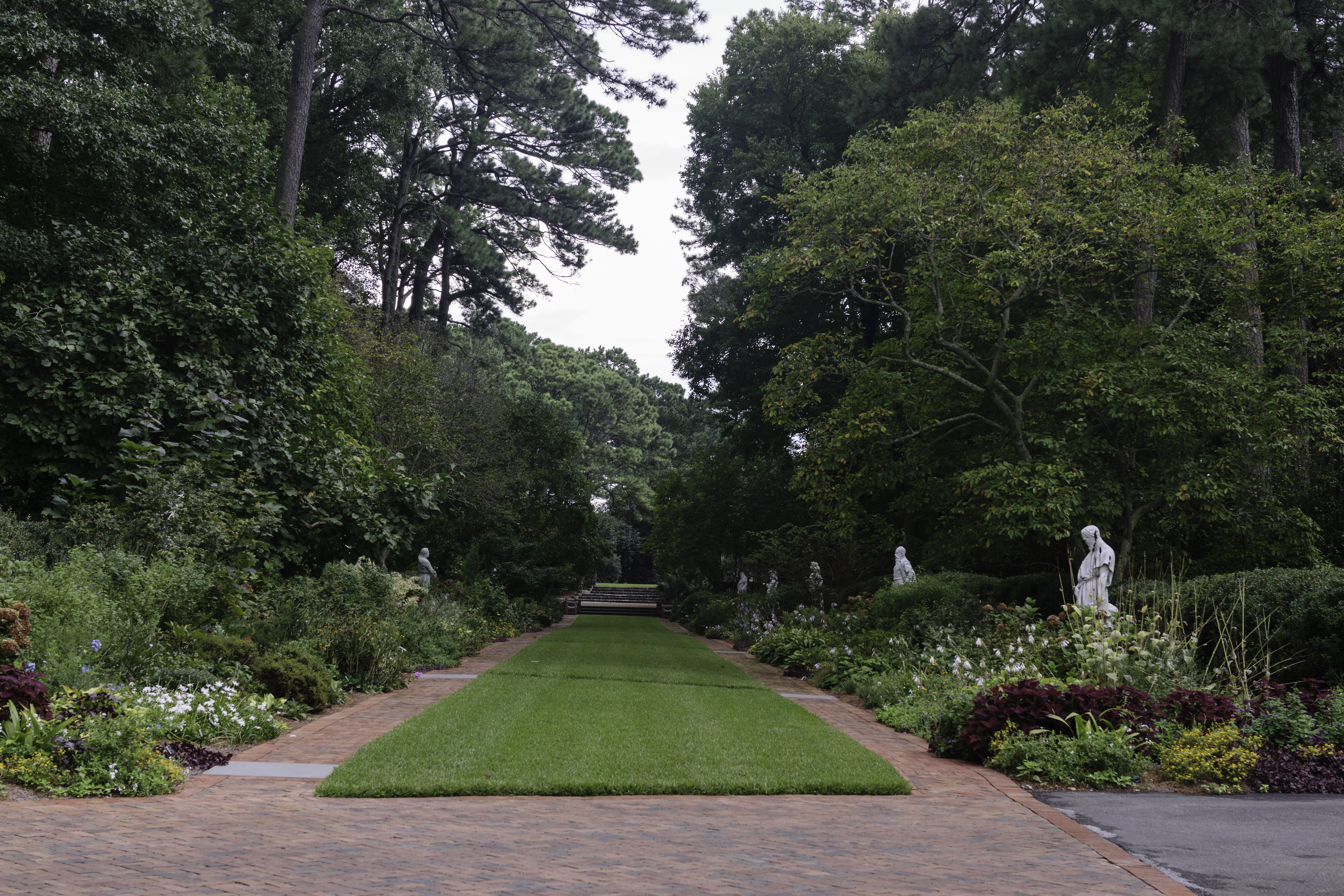
Statuary Vista

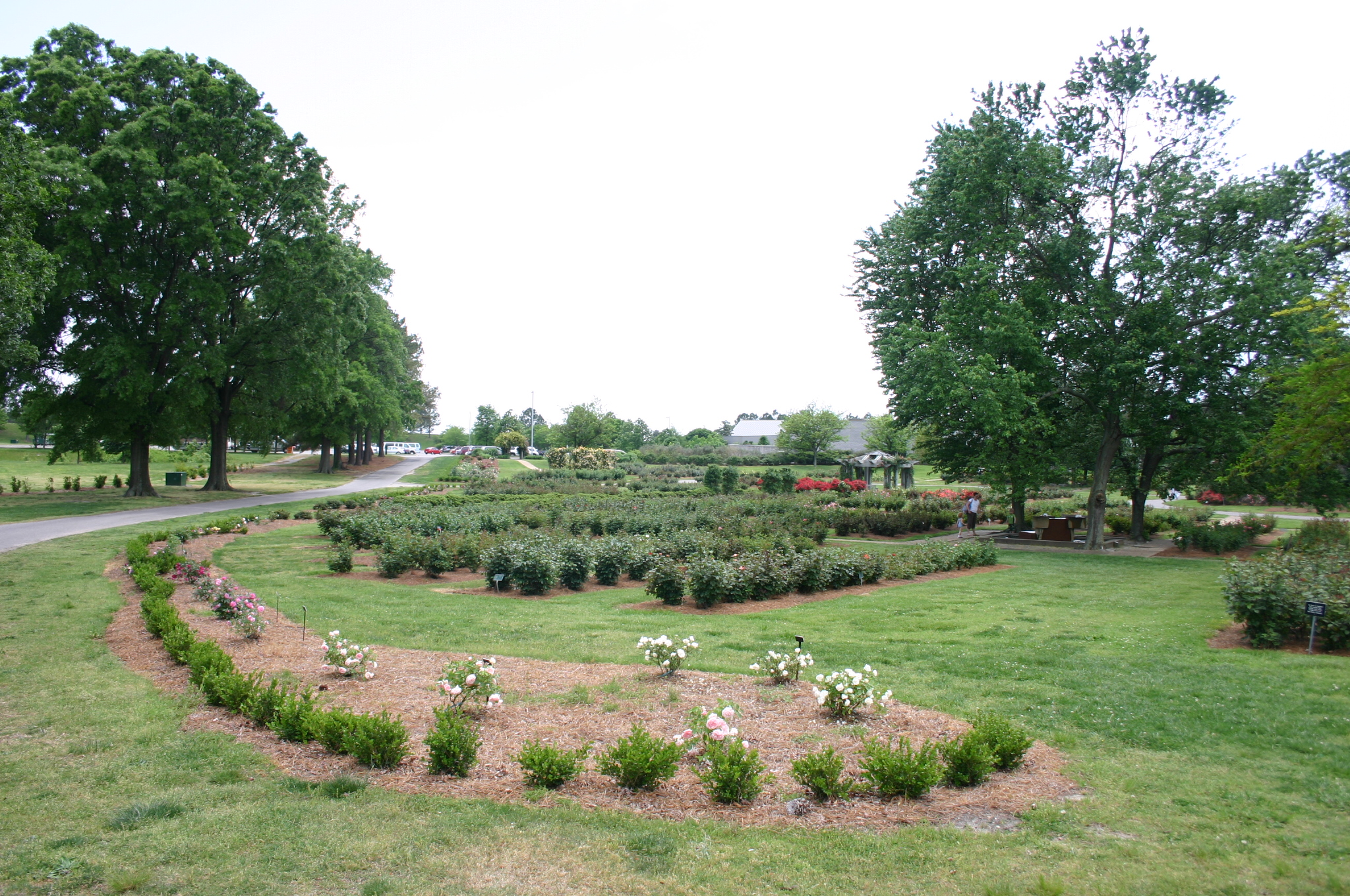
Margaret Moore Hall Bicentennial Rose Garden

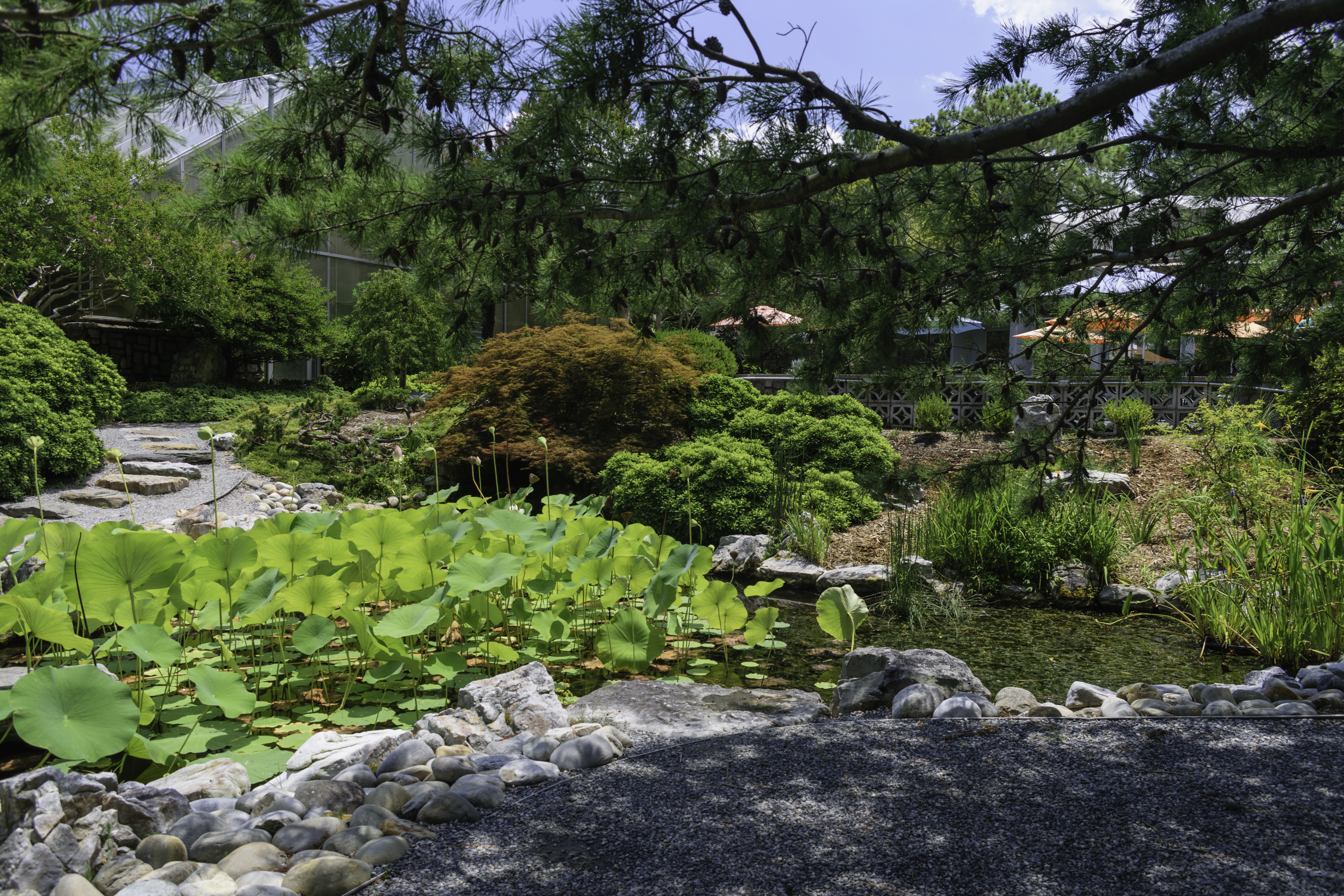
Japanese Garden

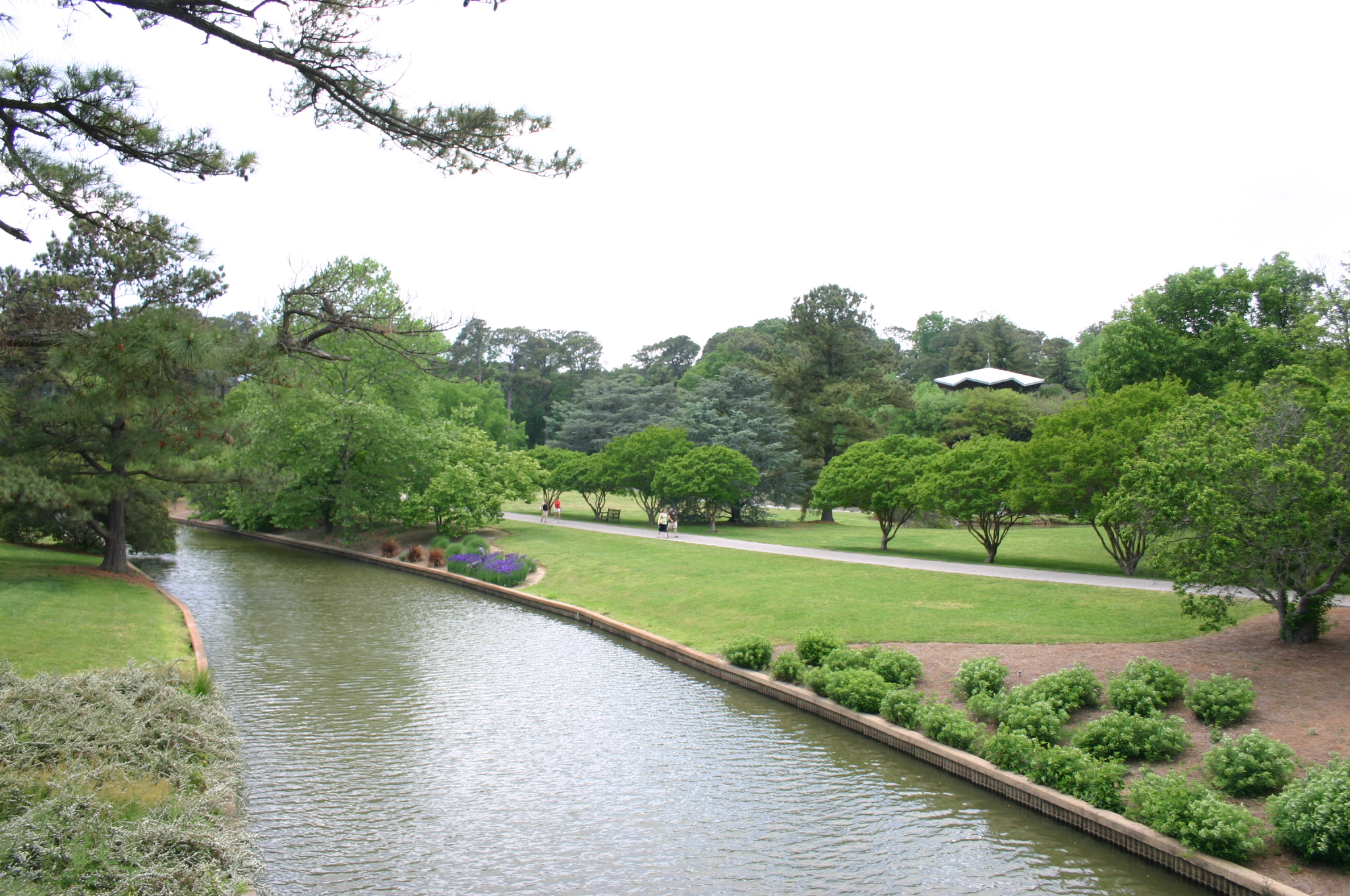
Canal view

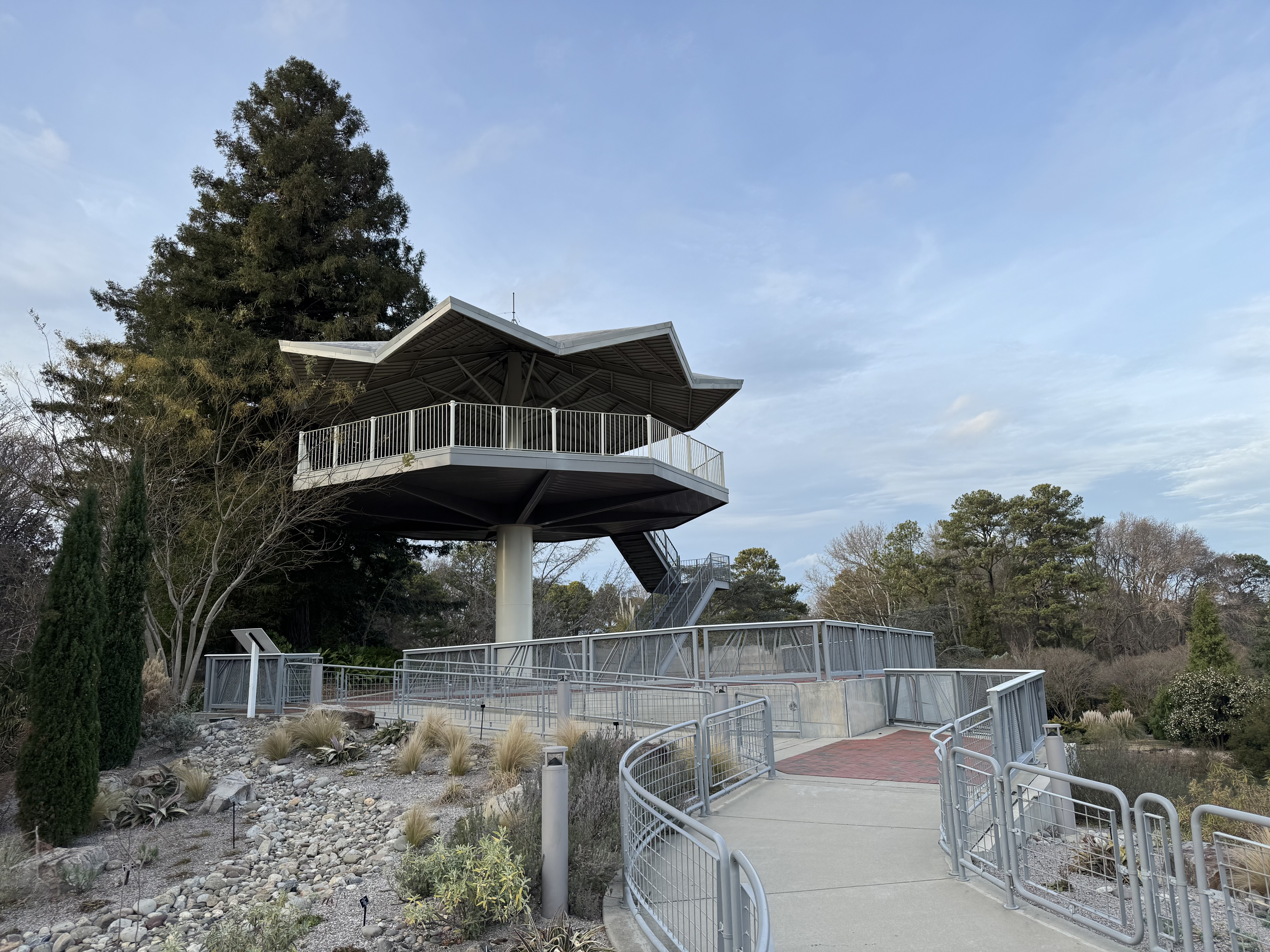
NATO Tower

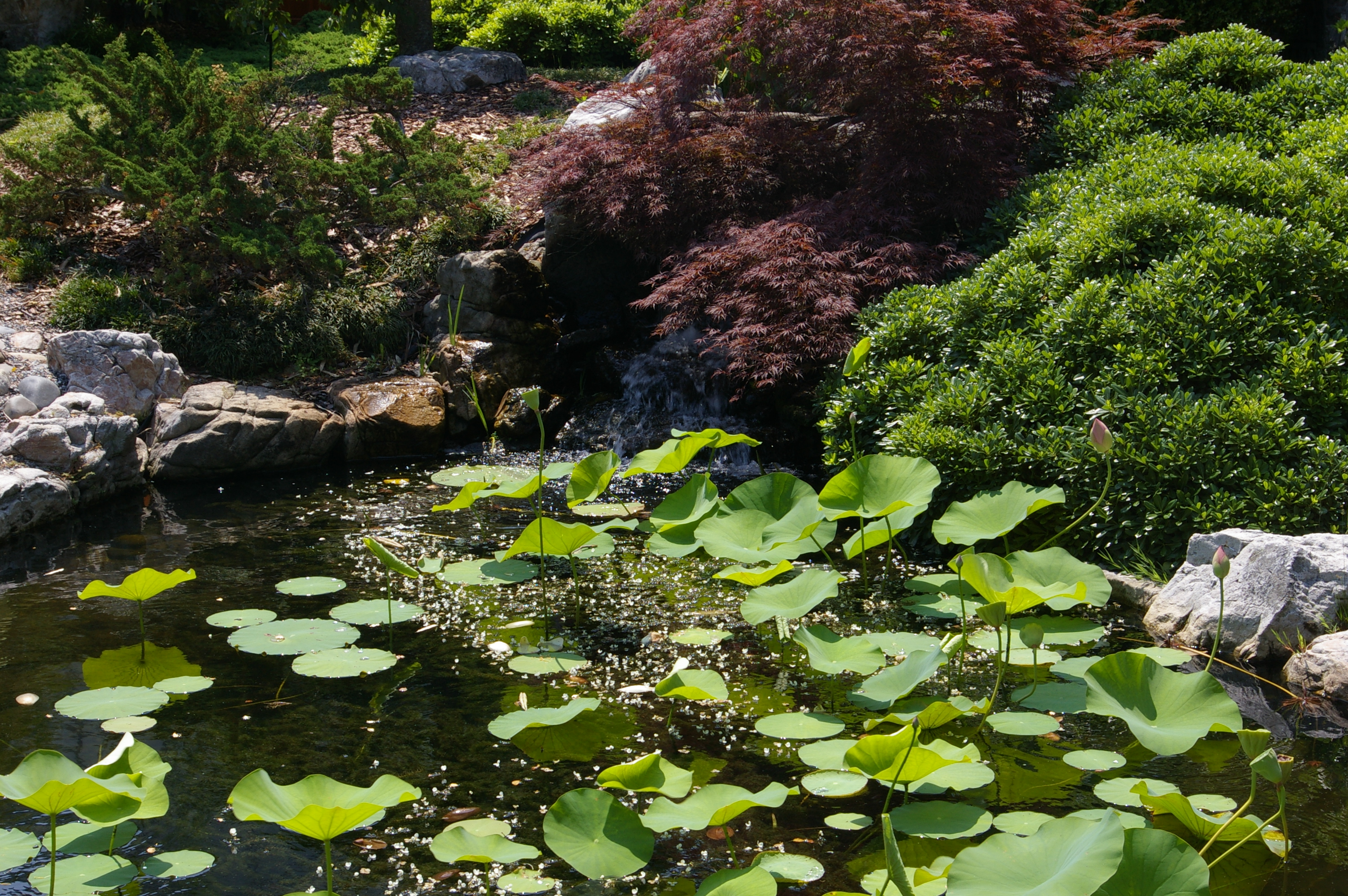
Japanese Garden waterfall

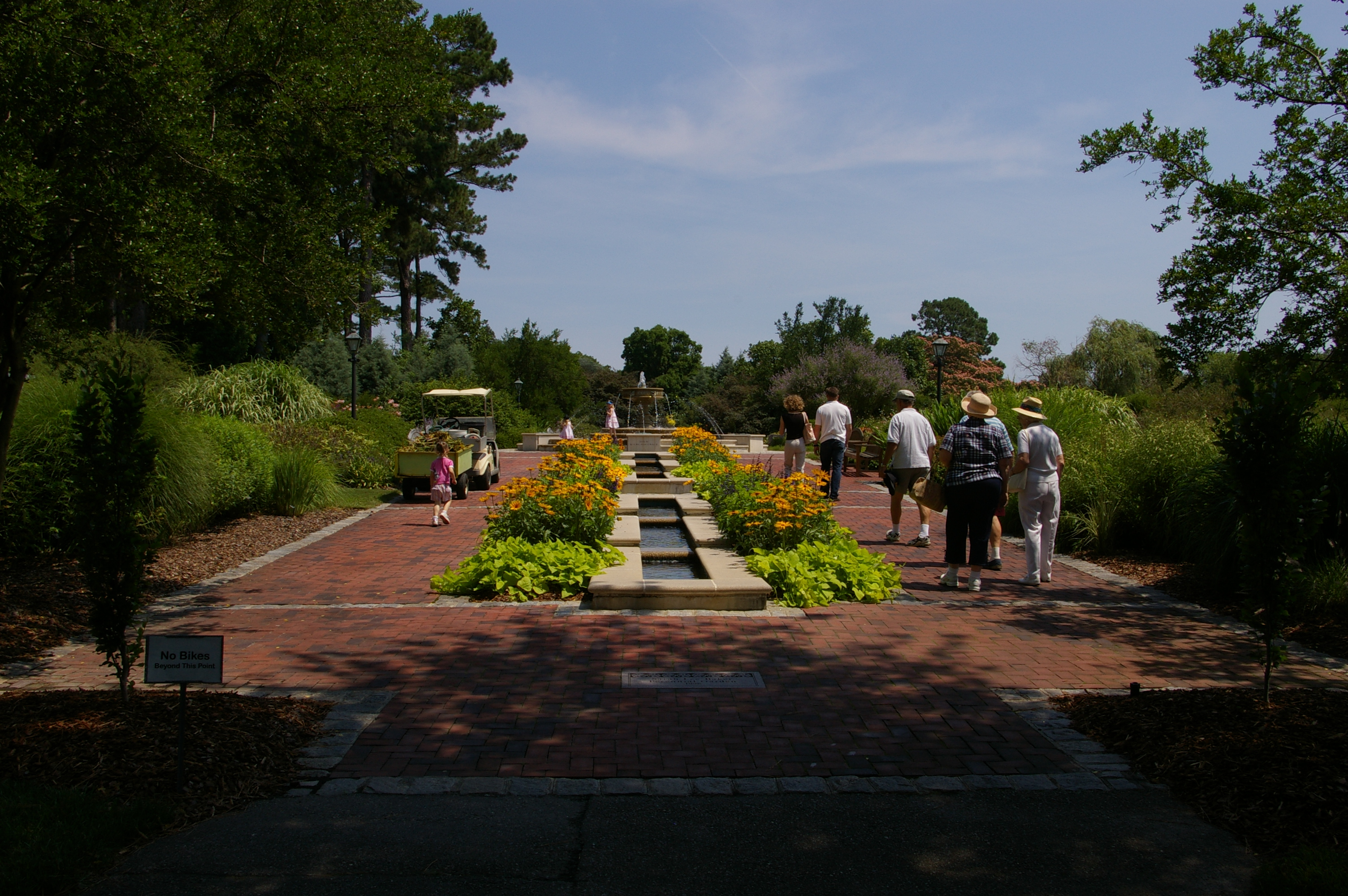
Fountain in the Perennial Garden

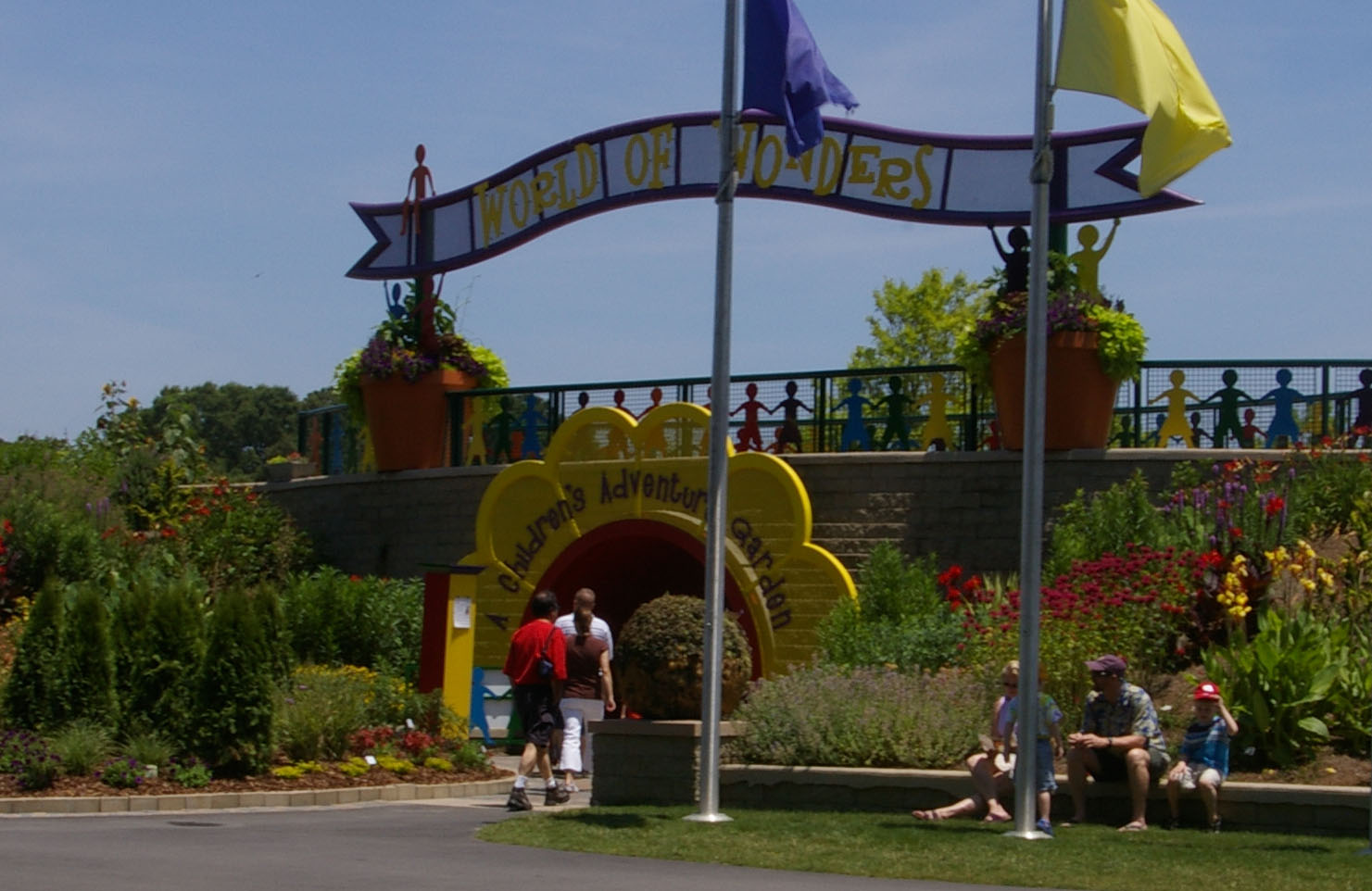
Entrance to World of Wonders

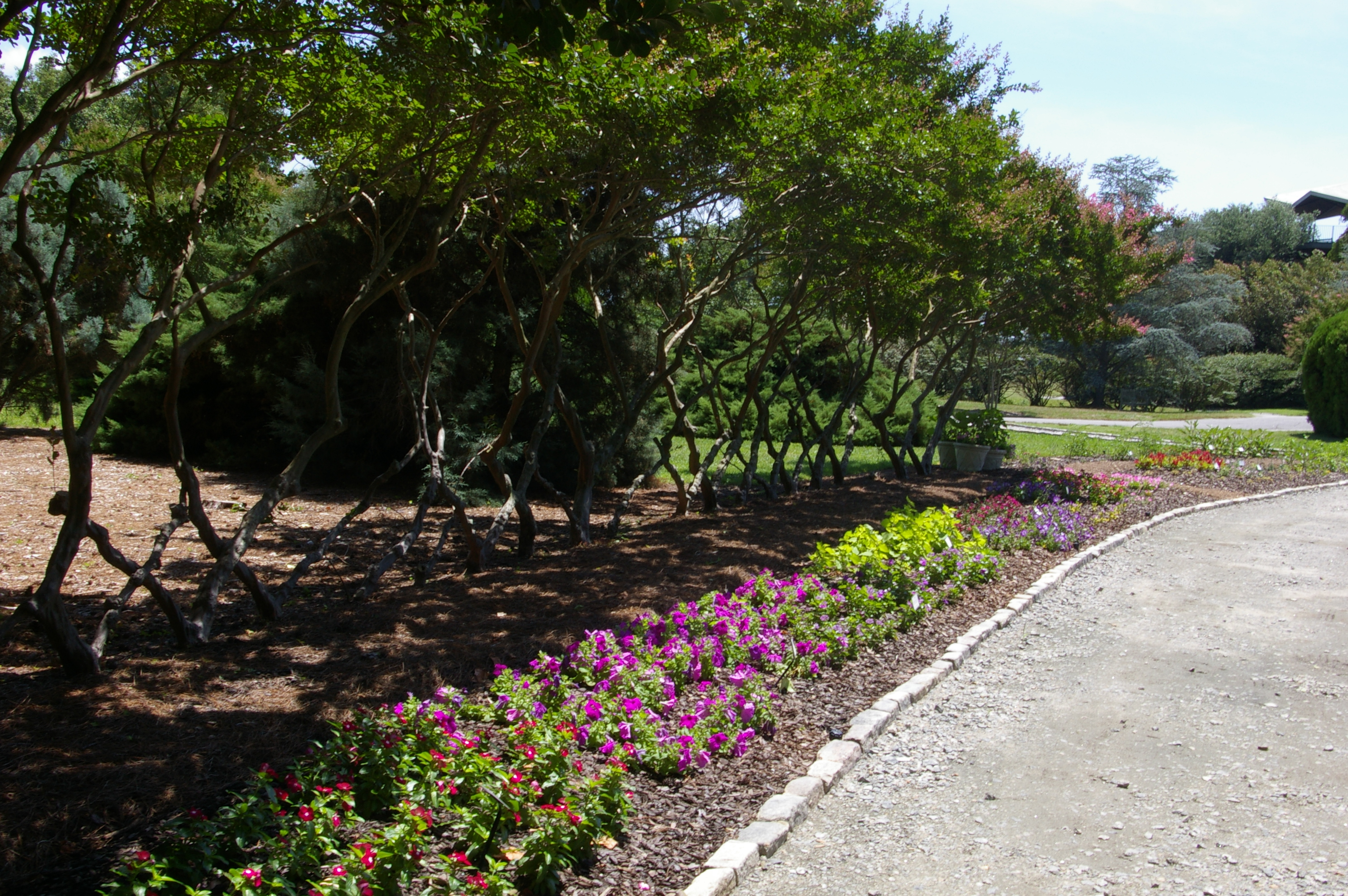
Border Walk

== See also ==
- List of botanical gardens in the United States
