= Transportation in Virginia Beach, Virginia =

Virginia Beach, Virginia's development is tied to the establishment of a transportation infrastructure that allowed access to the Atlantic shoreline.

== History ==
In 1883, the Norfolk, Virginia Beach Railroad and Improvement Company built a narrow-gauge road between the namesake cities. The venture struggled, and was reorganized in 1887 as the Norfolk and Virginia Beach Railroad, and in 1891 as the Norfolk, Albemarle and Southern Railroad, before being sold under court order in 1896, becoming the Norfolk, Virginia Beach and Atlantic Railroad. Standard-gauged in 1898, a branch was constructed from Virginia Beach to Munden Point from which steamers plied Currituck Sound. The line was absorbed by the Norfolk and Southern Railroad in January 1900.

The Chesapeake Transit Company opened an electric traction line from Norfolk to Virginia Beach by way of Cape Henry in 1902, and the N&S extended its steam line north to Cape Henry to meet the competition. The Norfolk & Southern electrified its beach line in 1904 and purchased the transit company, giving the road two parallel lines up the beach. The steam line was abandoned, and the loop line thus created much in the development of beach real estate. Electric power was provided by a coal-fired plant at Bayville, on the northern beach route.

The Norfolk Southern found its passenger business threatened by highway development in the mid-1920s, and as with many railroads in that period, the NS created a highway bus subsidiary, the Norfolk Southern Bus Corp., commencing operations in June 1926. The NS bus routes primarily paralleled the rail lines.

During the 1920s and 1930s, a conventional train with a through Pullman from New York City, hauled by electric boxcab locomotives, operated to the Cavalier Hotel. Gas electric cars replaced the electric cars in 1935, and passenger service ended altogether in 1948, on the beach as well as the southbound lines. Sold at foreclosure in 1941 after the Depression, the Norfolk Southern Railway began operations in 1942, and five miles (8.0 km) of disused track between Back Bay and Munden was taken up in 1943 for the war effort scrap drives. A timetable effective April 28, 1946, shows eleven round-trips (22 trains) between Terminal Station-Norfolk, and the Cavalier Hotel, although train no. 65 would operate to 122nd Street, after the 6:55 p.m. stop at the hotel, if passengers so desired. The seven miles (11 km) of the line along Virginia Beach were lifted in 1950, and the North Shore route in 1954. On August 8, 2007, the new Norfolk Southern Railway (product of the 1982 merger between the Norfolk & Western Railway and the Southern Railway System, who had acquired ownership of the NS in 1974) filed to abandon 15.46 miles (24.88 km) of the existing east–west line between Norfolk and Virginia Beach.

Depot

The primary depot was located at Seventeenth Street at approximately milepost 17.5, although several other stops were made, including the Cavalier Hotel, although most were little more than concrete alighting platforms.

== Modern Day ==
The city is primarily served by the nearby Norfolk International Airport (IATA: ORF, ICAO: KORF). Also located within the Hampton Roads metro area is the Newport News/Williamsburg International Airport (IATA: PHF, ICAO: KPHF).

The city is connected to I-64 via I-264, which runs from the oceanfront, intersects with I-64 on the east side of Norfolk, and continues through downtown Norfolk and Portsmouth until rejoining I-64 at the terminus of both roads in Chesapeake where Interstate 664 completes the loop which forms the Hampton Roads Beltway. Travelers to and from Virginia Beach can access the Hampton Roads Beltway in either direction from I-264 in Norfolk to use a choice of the two bridge-tunnel facilities to cross Hampton Roads to reach the Peninsula, Williamsburg, Richmond and points north.

The city is also connected to Virginia's Eastern Shore region via the Chesapeake Bay Bridge-Tunnel (CBBT), which is the longest bridge-tunnel complex in the world and known as one of the Seven Engineering Wonders of the Modern World. The CBBT, a tolled facility carries U.S. Route 13.

Transportation within the city, as well as with other cities of Hampton Roads is served by a regional bus service, Hampton Roads Transit.

== See also ==
- Transportation in Hampton Roads
