= Transportation in Hampton Roads =

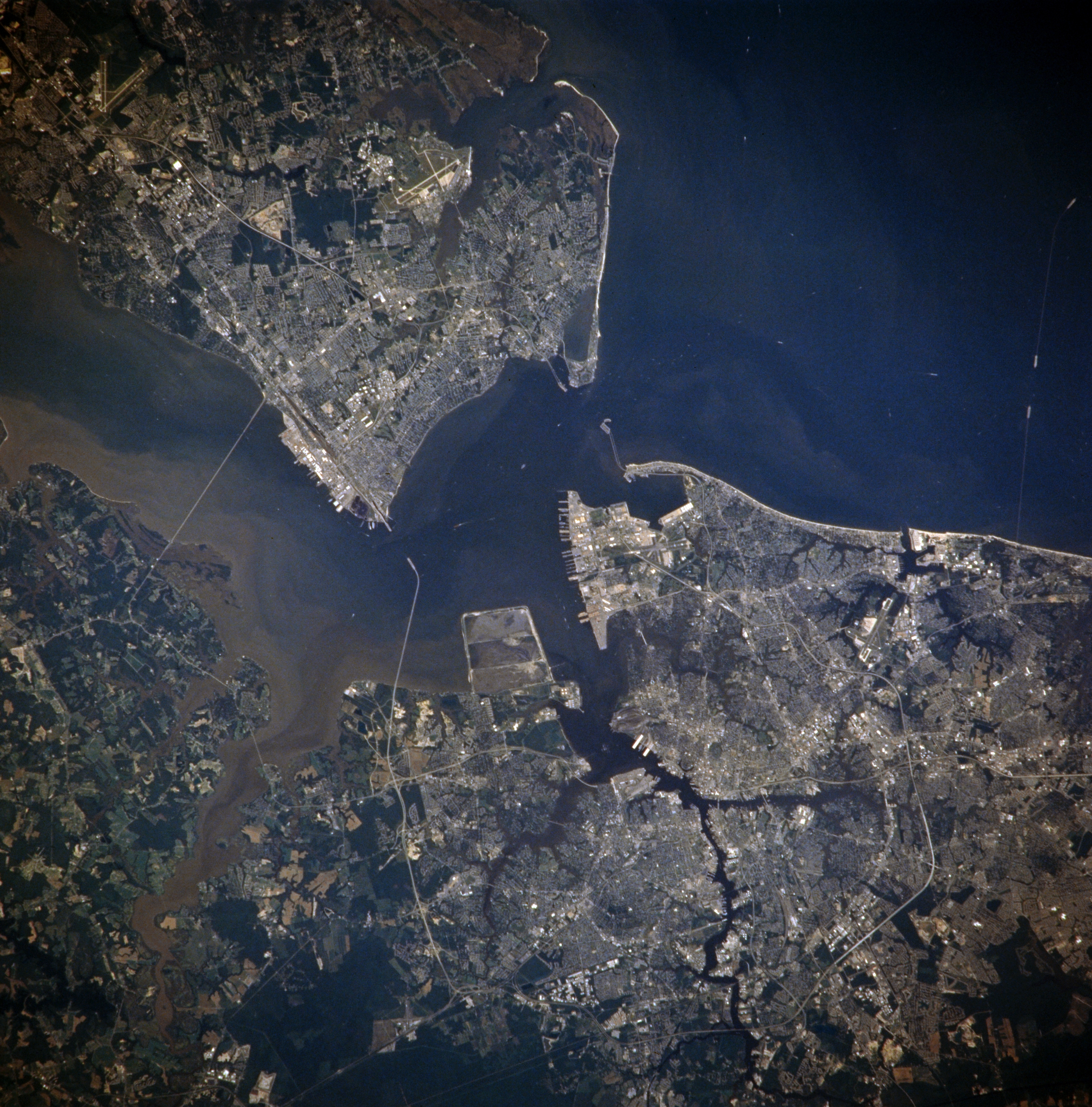
This view from space in July 1996 shows the majority of the Hampton Roads region which generally surround the harbor area of Hampton Roads, which framed by the Hampton Roads Bridge-Tunnel visible to the east (right), the Virginia Peninsula subregion to the north (top), and the Monitor-Merrimac Memorial Bridge-Tunnel to the west (left) and the 3 branches of the Elizabeth River which drain into the harbor from the south (bottom), running through many communities of the South Hampton Roads subregion. The Monitor-Merrimac Memorial Bridge Tunnel runs along a strip of I-664 to I-64 across the James River. To the west of the harbor, are the mouths of the James River (upper left) and the Nansemond River (lower left). Crossing the James River, the 4-mile (6 km)-long James River Bridge is also clearly visible, connecting Newport News with Isle of Wight County. NASA photograph

Historically, the harbor was the key to the Hampton Roads area's growth, both on land and in water-related activities and events. Ironically, the harbor and its tributary waterways were (and still are) both important transportation conduits and obstacles to other land-based commerce and travel. For hundreds of years, state and community leaders have worked to develop solutions to accommodate both.

Many early bridges were constructed and funded privately through the collection of tolls. Later, state-sponsorship was required to fund larger projects. The best example of many was in 1957, when the world's first continuous bridge-tunnel complex was successfully completed across the mouth of the Hampton Roads harbor, innovatively designed and funded with toll revenue bonds. Soon, another even larger one was built across the entire mouth of the Chesapeake Bay, exceeding many expectations.

In modern times, the region has faced increasing transportation challenges as it has become largely urbanized, with additional traffic needs. In the 21st century, the conflicts between traffic on vital waterways and land-based travel continue to present the area's leaders with extraordinary transportation challenges, both for additional capacity, and as the existing infrastructure, much of it originally built with toll revenues, has aged without an adequate source of funding to repair or build replacements. The now-closed Kings Highway Bridge in Suffolk and the Jordan Bridge in neighboring Chesapeake, each built in the 1920s, are considered locally prime examples of this situation.

Public opinion polls seem to indicate that many citizens feel the accomplishments with the historic bridge-tunnels across the harbor and nearby Chesapeake Bay and the many other improvements since, such as the completion of the Hampton Roads Beltway and a third bridge-tunnel (second across the harbor) in 1992 are indicative that the region's leaders will be capable of seeking and employing new transportation and funding solutions for the future, and that they will receive the necessary public support to do so.

In 2007, the new Hampton Roads Transportation Authority (HRTA) was formed under a controversial state law to levy various additional taxes to generate funding for major regional transportation projects, including a long-sought and costly so-called third crossing of the harbor of Hampton Roads. As of March 2008, although its projects were considered to be needed, the agency's future was in some question while its controversial sources of funding were being reconsidered in light of a Virginia Supreme Court decision. In the time since, a shift to facilities to be developed and maintained by public-private partnerships collecting tolls has come into greater focus. One such project, a replacement for the Jordan Bridge, was completed October 26, 2012.

== Highways, bridges, tunnels, bridge-tunnels, ferry system ==
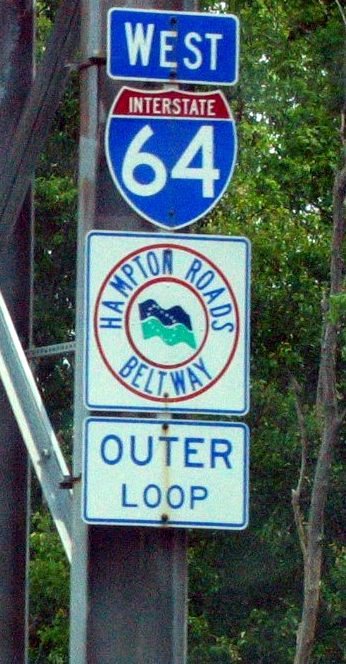
I-64 on the Hampton Roads Beltway, north of I-264

The Hampton Roads area has an extensive network of Interstate Highways, including the Interstate 64, the major east-west route to and from the area, and its spurs and bypasses of I-264, I-464, I-564, and I-664.

Long-term plans being pushed by the Raleigh-Durham area's Regional Transportation Alliance call for extension of I-495 northeastward to the Hampton Roads area. RTA's plan envisions the entirety of the corridor from Raleigh to Norfolk receiving a new two-digit interstate designation such as I-44. This interstate would connect two of the United States' largest metropolitan areas still lacking direct interstate access between each other.

The Hampton Roads Beltway extends 56 miles (90 km) on a long loop through the region, crossing the harbor on two toll-free bridge-tunnel facilities. These crossings are the Hampton Roads Bridge-Tunnel between Phoebus in Hampton and Willoughby Spit in Norfolk and the Monitor-Merrimac Memorial Bridge-Tunnel between Newport News and Suffolk. The Beltway connects with another Interstate highway and three arterial U.S. Highways at Bower's Hill near the northeastern edge of the Great Dismal Swamp.

Other major east-west routes are U.S. Route 58, U.S. Route 60, and U.S. Route 460. The major north-south routes are U.S. Route 13 and U.S. Route 17.

Another major crossing of waterways is the James River Bridge, carrying US 17, US 258, and SR 32 from Newport News to Isle of Wight County.

There are also two other tunnels in the area, the Midtown Tunnel, and the Downtown Tunnel joining Portsmouth and Norfolk, as well as the 17-mile (27 km)-long Chesapeake Bay Bridge-Tunnel, a toll facility which links the region with Virginia's Eastern Shore which carries US 13. The original Downtown Tunnel in conjunction with the Berkley Bridge were considered a single bridge and tunnel complex when completed in 1952, perhaps stimulating the innovative bridge-tunnel design using man-made islands when the Hampton Roads Bridge-Tunnel was planned, first opening in 1957.

The George P. Coleman Memorial Bridge is a major toll bridge connecting U.S. Highway 17 on the Peninsula at Yorktown with Virginia's Middle Peninsula region.

Although earlier ferry services across the Bay, the harbor, and various rivers were eventually supplanted in the 20th century by bridges, tunnels, and bridge-tunnels, a passenger ferry continues to operate between Norfolk and Portsmouth, and one major automobile ferry service also remains. The Jamestown Ferry (also known as the Jamestown-Scotland Ferry) is an automobile ferry system on the James River connecting Jamestown in James City County with Scotland in Surry County. It carries State Route 31. Operated by VDOT, it is the only 24-hour state-run ferry operation in Virginia and has over 90 employees. It operates four ferryboats, the Pocahontas, the Williamsburg, the Surry, and the Virginia. The facility is toll-free.

== Local public transportation ==
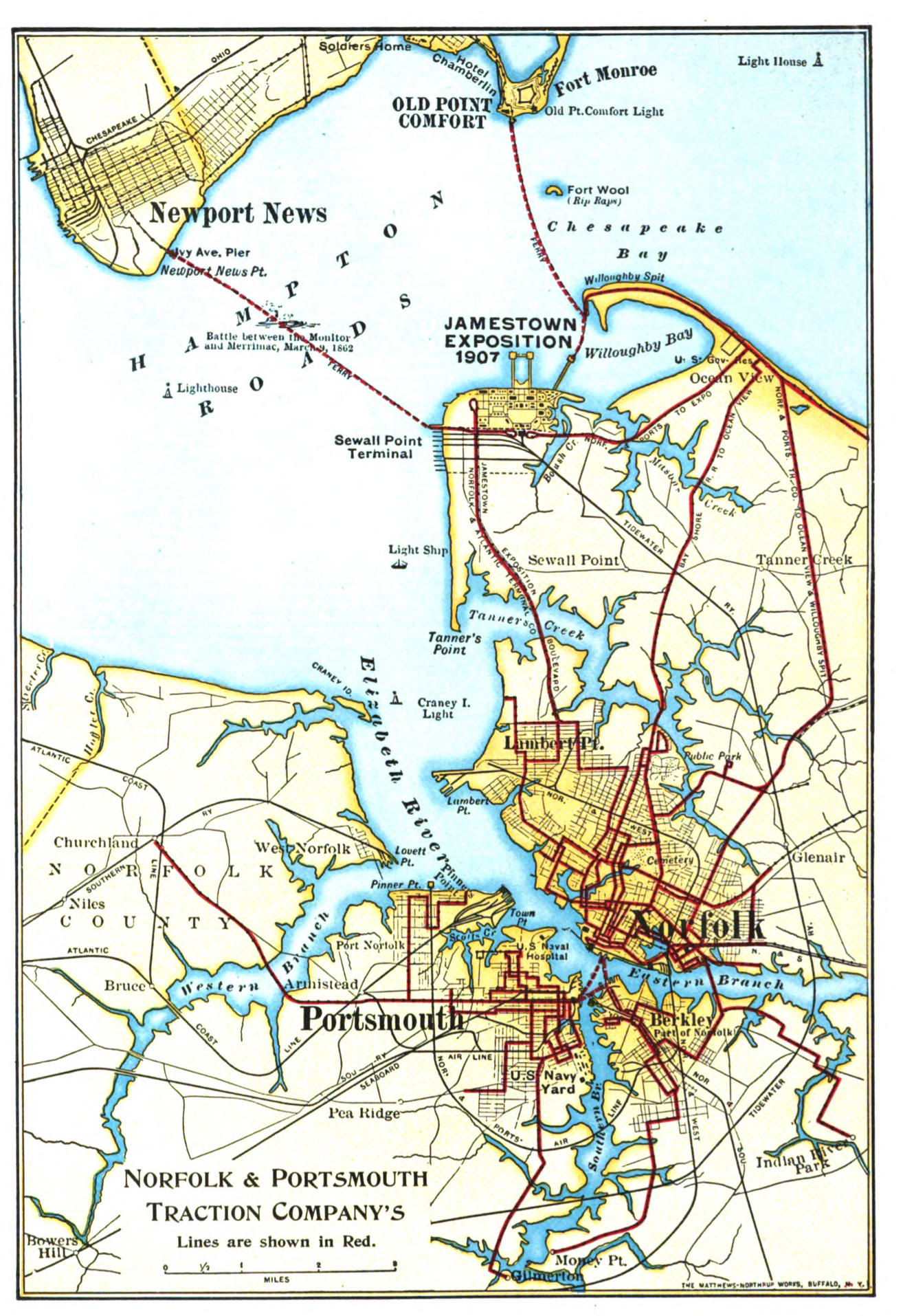
Map of Norfolk and Portsmouth Traction Company's Lines c 1907

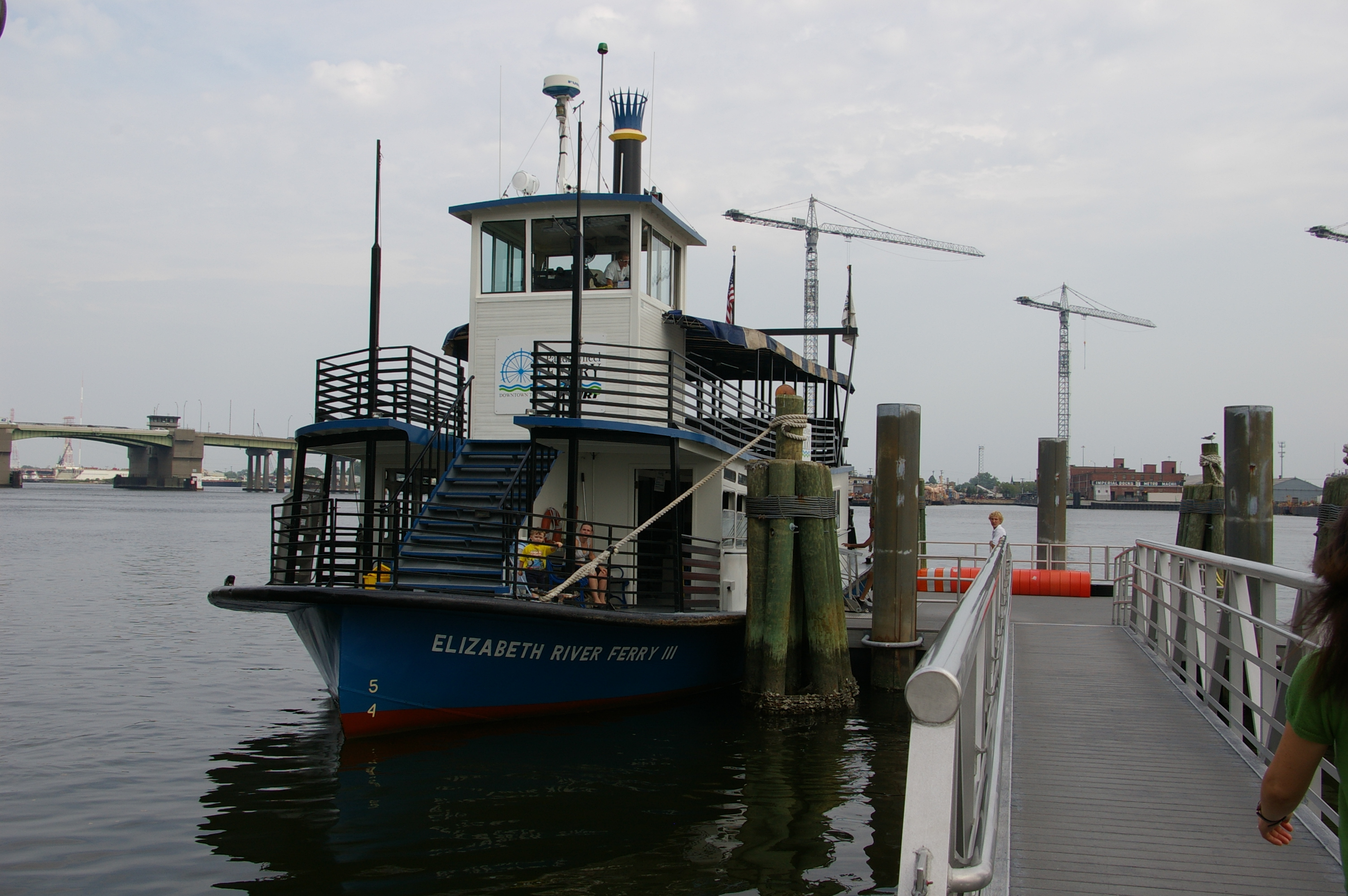
Ferry Between Norfolk and Portsmouth

Local public transit is provided by a bus network operated by the Hampton Roads Transit (HRT) and Williamsburg Area Transit Authority (WATA), both of which are operations of government agencies. HRT's The Tide light rail system has completed construction and opened in early 2011.

In Virginia, the region is notable in that it has 2 types of public transport services via ferries. A passenger ferry is operated on the Elizabeth River between downtown areas of Norfolk and Portsmouth by HRT. A commuter bus route across the James River between Williamsburg and rural Surry County is provided via the vehicle-carrying Jamestown Ferry system.

=== Hampton Roads Transit ===
A regional transit bus system, paratransit service, and the Tide light rail system are provided by Hampton Roads Transit (HRT), a regional public transport system headquartered in Hampton. The HRT service area include the major population centers of Hampton Roads which are linked to each other by the Hampton Roads Beltway. Commuter service is provided through both major bridge-tunnels across the harbor helps reduce congestion in many other high traffic corridors. Many areas in adjoining communities are also served.

As the largest transit operator, Hampton Roads Transit is southeastern Virginia's most reliable mobility source, serving over 17 million annual passengers in the Hampton Roads metropolitan area. HRT currently serves 1.2 million people within its 369-square-mile (960 km^{2}) service area.

=== Williamsburg Area Transit Authority ===
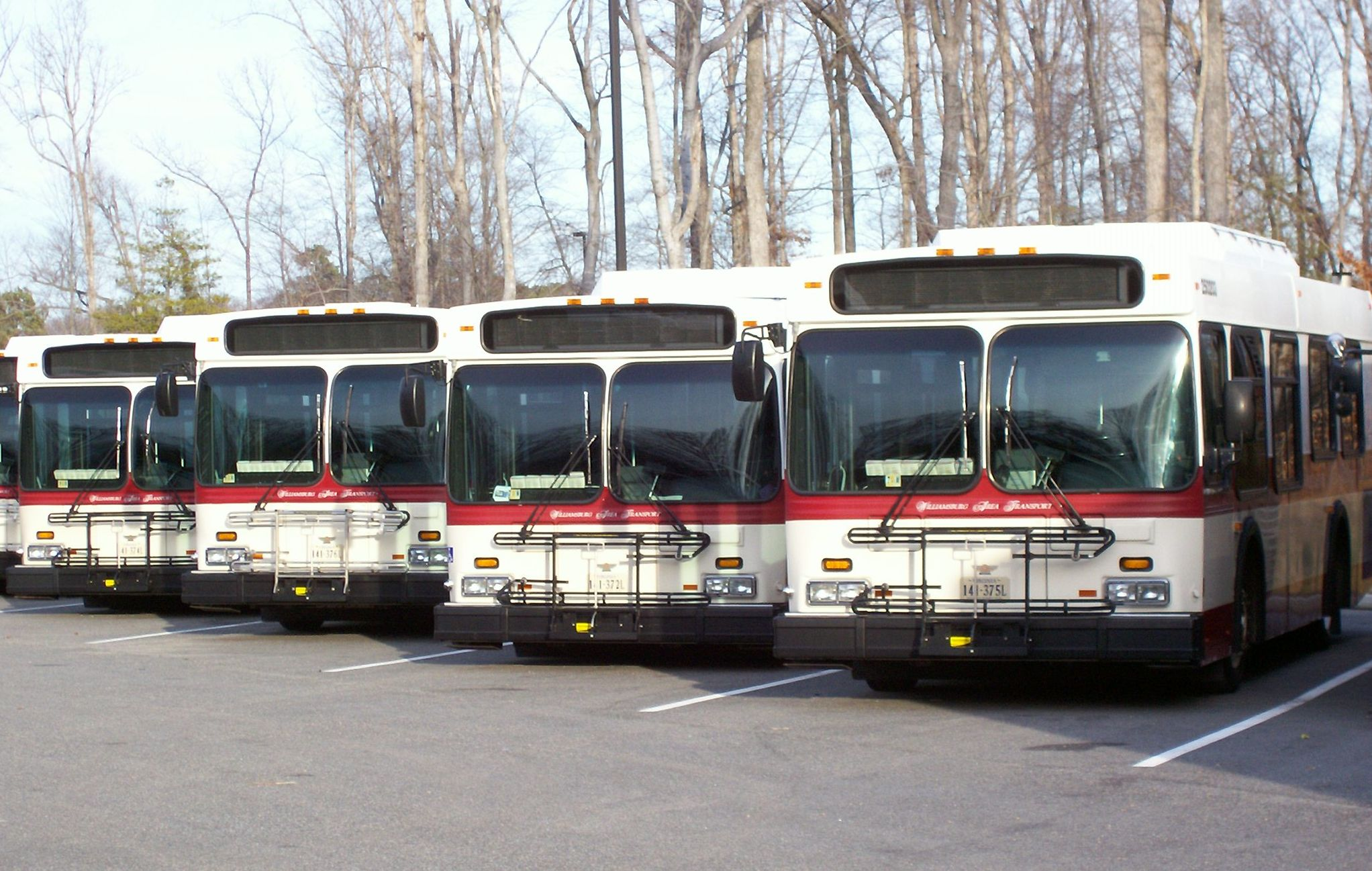
A line of WAT transit buses equipped with 2-way radios, wheelchair lifts and bike racks are seen ready for service at the Williamsburg Bus Facility on U.S. Route 60 in James City County, Virginia.

Williamsburg Transportation Center is an intermodal facility located in a restored Chesapeake and Ohio Railway station located within walking distance of Colonial Williamsburg's Historic Area, the College of William and Mary, and the downtown area.

In the upper (western) Peninsula area known as the Historic Triangle, a transit bus system and paratransit services are provided by Williamsburg Area Transit Authority (WATA), based in the Williamsburg area, which serves Williamsburg, James City County, and a portion of York County. The system offers a connection with the much larger Hampton Roads Transit system at Lee Hall, Virginia and at the Williamsburg Transportation Center.

The Williamsburg Transportation Center is located in a restored building which was formerly a Chesapeake and Ohio Railway station. Along the railroad line built to connect the Ohio River Valley with the new city of Newport News and the port of Hampton Roads by Collis P. Huntington in 1881, the station was originally built in 1935 with funding from John D. Rockefeller Jr. as part of the restoration of the colonial capital which became known worldwide as Colonial Williamsburg. During the heyday of the railroads, dozens of dignitaries arrived there, including Presidents Franklin D. Roosevelt, Harry S. Truman and Dwight D. Eisenhower and Winston Churchill. In modern times, the center offers good non-automobile driving alternatives for visitors and citizens, both getting there, and moving around locally, with rail service, intercity and local transit bus services.

=== Light rail, bus rapid transit, maglev projects ===
A light rail service known as The Tide opened in Norfolk on August 19, 2011 and extends 7.4 miles from the Eastern Virginia Medical School complex, east through downtown Norfolk and to the Newtown Road station adjacent Interstate 264. Operated by Hampton Roads Transit, it is the first major light rail service in the state. As of April 17, 2012, the daily ridership was estimated to be 4,900.

The Virginia Beach Transit Extension Study examined options for extending The Tide, or adding bus rapid transit, from its current Newtown Road terminus to the Virginia Beach Town Center and the Oceanfront. Work on the extension, however, was halted after the results of a 2016 ballot referendum.

Light rail has also been studied for Hampton and Newport News.

Old Dominion University attempted to build an experimental Magnetic levitation system on its campus in Norfolk but it was never operational before its ultimate demolition.

== Intercity bus ==
Intercity bus service is provided by Flix/Greyhound and the Virginia Breeze, a state-supported service that connects with Richmond, Charlottesville, and the Shenandoah Valley.

== Passenger rail ==
The area is served by Amtrak passenger rail with two lines of the Amtrak Virginia service of the Northeast Regional. Trains on both lines connect Hampton Roads with Richmond, Washington, DC, and the rest of the Northeast Corridor.

Amtrak currently provides three daily trains to Norfolk and two to Newport News.

There are currently three stations in Hampton Roads with service:

- Williamsburg station (WBG): Located in central Williamsburg, near the College of William and Mary and Colonial Williamsburg
- Newport News station (NPN): Located in mid-town Newport News, near the PHF Airport and Interstate 64, it replaced the Newport News station in 2024
- Norfolk station (NFK): Located in downtown Norfolk, adjacent Harbor Park and with a connection to the Tide Light Rail network

Through its Amtrak Thruway connecting bus service, Amtrak riders can be transported from Norfolk onward to Virginia Beach.

The Virginia Department of Rail and Public Transportation has studies underway for extending high speed passenger rail to the Virginia Peninsula and South Hampton Roads areas with a rail connection at Richmond to the Southeast High Speed Rail Corridor.

== Air ==
The Hampton Roads is served by two major commercial airports: Norfolk International Airport and the smaller Newport News/Williamsburg International Airport. Alternatively, some travelers from the Peninsula and Williamsburg area also sometimes use Richmond International Airport, located 42 miles (68 km) west of Williamsburg and 8 miles (13 km) east of Richmond in Henrico County, Virginia.

=== Norfolk International Airport ===
Norfolk International Airport (ORF) is the main air passenger and cargo transport hub in the region. Offering nearly 160 arrivals and departures daily to major cities throughout the US, Norfolk International recorded a record number of passengers, 4.9 million passengers, in 2025.

Since 2021, it has been an operating base for low-cost airline Breeze Airways. Breeze serve more than twenty destinations from its base in Norfolk, including ORF's first international destination, Cancún.

The airport is served by seven airlines, with flights to more than thirty nonstop destinations:

- American Airlines
  - American Eagle
- Breeze Airways
- Delta Air Lines
  - Delta Connection
- Frontier Airlines
- JetBlue
- Southwest Airlines
- United Airlines
  - United Express

=== Newport News/Williamsburg International Airport ===
Newport News/Williamsburg International Airport (PHF) (formerly known as Patrick Henry Field) is a regional air passenger transport hub in Newport News. The airport, which was once among the fastest growing airports in the country (by passenger volume), and is now served by just one (1) airline, with flights to one nonstop destination.

From 2012 to 2014, it was the hub for up-start low-cost carrier People Express Airlines, which took its name from the famous 1970s airline of the same name.

As of 2026, destinations include:

- American Eagle - Charlotte

== See also ==
- Hampton Roads Transportation Accountability Commission
- Transportation of Virginia Beach
- Transportation of Norfolk
- Transportation in Williamsburg
