= Transportation in Norfolk, Virginia =

Located in the southeastern corner of the state, Norfolk is economically and culturally important to Virginia. A variety of transportation modes have developed around the city's importance and somewhat unusual geography.

== Rail ==
In the late 19th century and the early 20th century, Norfolk was served by three passenger railroads, with destinations in various directions. Norfolk Terminal Station, a union station, served Norfolk & Western trains bound west for Roanoke and other cities across Virginia, and further to Cincinnati, and Norfolk Southern (old company) trains bound for Raleigh and to Virginia Beach. The Virginian Railway was bound for Roanoke and Deep Water, West Virginia. Norfolk Southern passenger service was discontinued by the end of the 1940s. The Virginian Railway passenger trains were discontinued by 1956. The N&W trains ceased using Terminal Station in 1962; the last N&W train, the Pocahontas continued to 1971 at the replacement station.

Today, Norfolk is served by Amtrak at the Norfolk station. The line runs west along the NS/(US460) Southside corridor to Petersburg, then continues to Richmond and points beyond. A high-speed rail connection at Richmond to both the Northeast Corridor and the Southeast High Speed Rail Corridor are also under study.

== Advent of the highway (1952–1970) ==
Hampton Roads Bridge Tunnel

With the dawn of the Interstate Highway System, new highways opened and a series of bridges and tunnels opening over fifteen years would link Norfolk with the Peninsula, Portsmouth, and Virginia Beach. On May 23, 1952, the Downtown Tunnel opened connecting Norfolk with the city of Portsmouth. A second parallel tube was built in 1987. The Downtown Tunnel flows in four lanes (two in each direction), carrying a portion of Interstate 264. In 1991, the new Downtown Tunnel/Berkley Bridge complex was completed, with a new system of multiple lanes of highway and interchanges connecting Downtown Norfolk and Interstate 464 with the Downtown Tunnel tubes. On November 1, 1957, the Hampton Roads Bridge-Tunnel opened to traffic, connecting the Virginia Peninsula with the city, signed as State Route 168. The new two-lane toll bridge-tunnel connection became a portion of Interstate 64 by the end of 1957, connecting Norfolk westward with a limited access freeway. A second parallel tube was built in 1976, expanding the access to four lanes. The tolls were removed in December 1976. The two-lane Midtown Tunnel was completed September 6, 1962, supplementing the Downtown Tunnel and the Berkley Bridge. On December 1, 1967, the Virginia Beach-Norfolk Expressway (Interstate 264 and State Route 44), a 12.1-mile-long (19.5 km) toll road leading from Baltic Avenue in Virginia Beach to Brambleton Avenue in Norfolk, opened to traffic at a cost of $34 million. Many at the time believed the project was doomed to fail due to the cost of 10 to 25 cents to access the expressway. Opponents argued that commuters would simply continue to use Virginia Beach Boulevard as the primary route to and from Virginia Beach. The Expressway was a resounding success however, perhaps too successful for Norfolk in that soon thereafter, many more people began to move to the neighboring city of Virginia Beach and commute back to work in Norfolk, a common practice which continues to this day. The tolls were removed on June 1, 1995, and State Route 44 portion of the freeway became signed as I-264 in July 1999.

== Roadways ==
Norfolk is linked with its neighbors through an extensive network of arterial and Interstate highways, bridges, tunnels, and bridge-tunnel complexes. The major east-west routes are Interstate 64, U.S. Route 58 (Virginia Beach Boulevard) and U.S. Route 60 (Ocean View Avenue). The major north-south routes are U.S. Route 13 and U.S. Route 460, also known as Granby Street. Other main roadways in Norfolk include Newtown Road, Waterside Drive, Tidewater Drive, and Military Highway. The Hampton Roads Beltway (I-64 and its spurs I-264, I-464, and I-664) makes a loop around Norfolk.

Long-term plans being pushed by the Raleigh-Durham area's Regional Transportation Alliance call for extension of I-495 northeastward to the Hampton Roads area. RTA's plan envisions the entirety of the corridor from Raleigh to Norfolk receiving a new two-digit interstate designation. This interstate would connect two of the United States' largest metropolitan areas still lacking direct interstate access between each other.

In May 2016, Interstate 87 was approved in North Carolina, opposed to I-44. Virginia's part of I-87 is a part of VDOT and has not been requested.

== Local transit ==
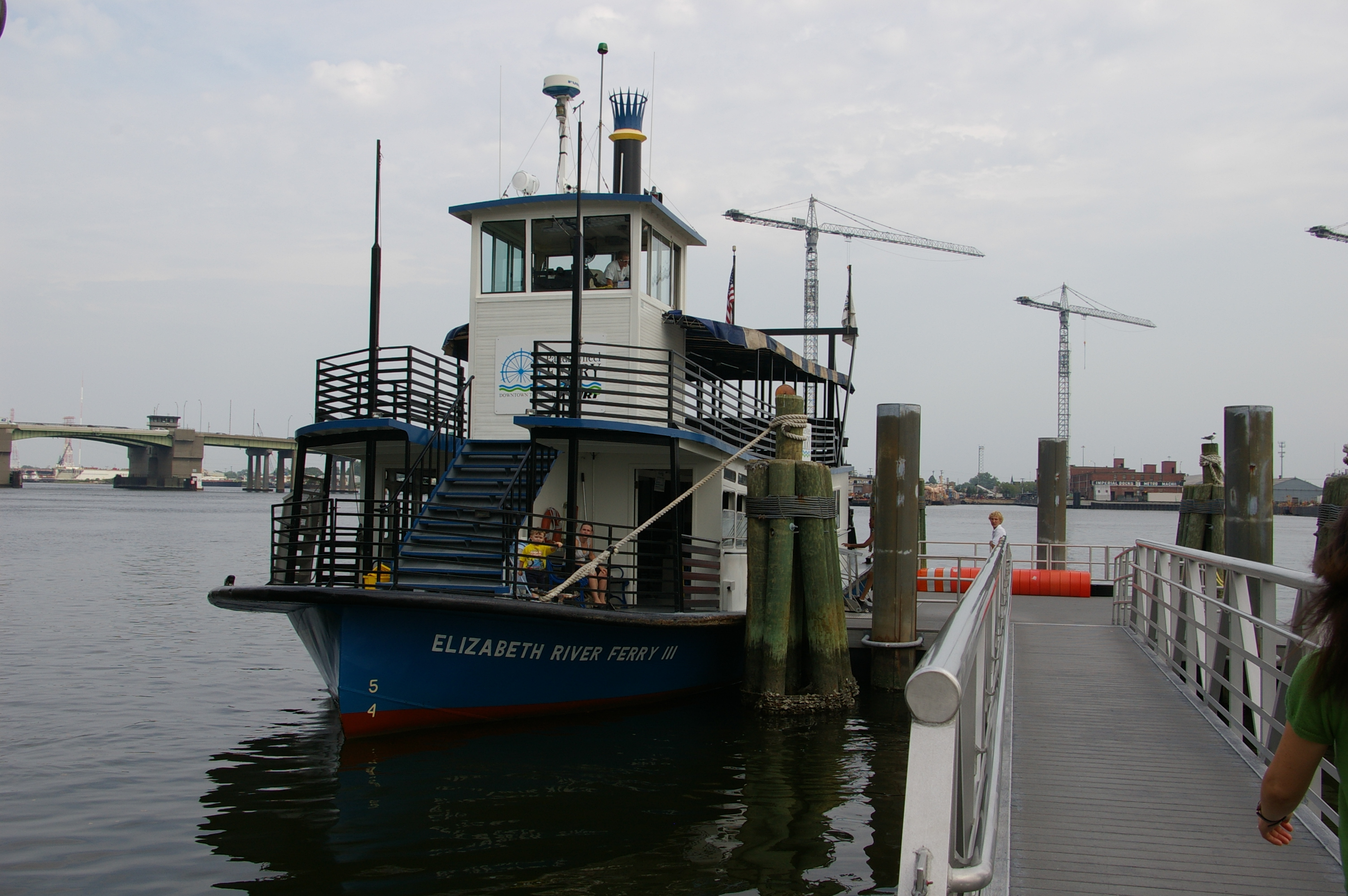
Ferry To Portsmouth

A bus system and paratransit service are provided by Hampton Roads Transit (HRT), a regional public transport system headquartered in Hampton. HRT buses run all over Norfolk and South Hampton Roads and onto the Peninsula all the way up to Williamsburg. Other routes travel to Smithfield, Virginia. HRT offers a toll ($2) ferry service from downtown Norfolk to Old Town Portsmouth. Additional services include an express bus and dedicated busses for the Norfolk Naval Base and park and ride lots. An express intercity bus system named 757 Express (formerly MAX) connects Norfolk to the other the cities in the Hampton Roads area. A 7.4 mile light rail line called The Tide serves downtown Norfolk and has 11 stations between EVMC and Newtown Road.

== Air, bus services, and cruise ships ==
Established in 1938, the Norfolk Municipal Airport and renamed Norfolk Regional Airport in 1968 and Norfolk International Airport in 1979, Norfolk is primarily served by the Norfolk International Airport(IATA: ORF, ICAO: KORF, FAA LID: ORF), now the region's major commercial airport. The airport is located near Chesapeake Bay, along the city limits straddling neighboring Virginia Beach. Seven airlines provide nonstop services to twenty five destinations. In , ORF had 3,703,664 passengers take off or land at its facility and 68,778,934 pounds of cargo process through its facilities. Newport News/Williamsburg International Airport also provides commercial air service for the Hampton Roads area. Chesapeake Regional Airport provides general aviation services and is located five miles outside of the city limits.

Greyhound provides service from the Norfolk Amtrak station and the Ballentine/Broad Creek light rail station. The former Greyhound bus station was vacated by the company and is awaiting redevelopment. Bus services to New York City via the Chinatown bus, Today's Bus, which is located on Newtown road.

The city completed construction in April 2007 of the new $36 million Half Moone Cruise Terminal in downtown adjacent to the Nauticus museum, providing a state-of-the-art permanent structure for various cruise lines and passengers wishing to embark from Norfolk. Previously, makeshift structures were used to embark or disembark passengers, supplies, and crew.

== See also ==
- Transportation in Hampton Roads
