= People Express Airlines =

People Express Airlines may refer to:

- People Express Airlines (1980s)
- People Express Airlines (2010s)
