= Vision Airlines =

US regional airline, 1994–2017

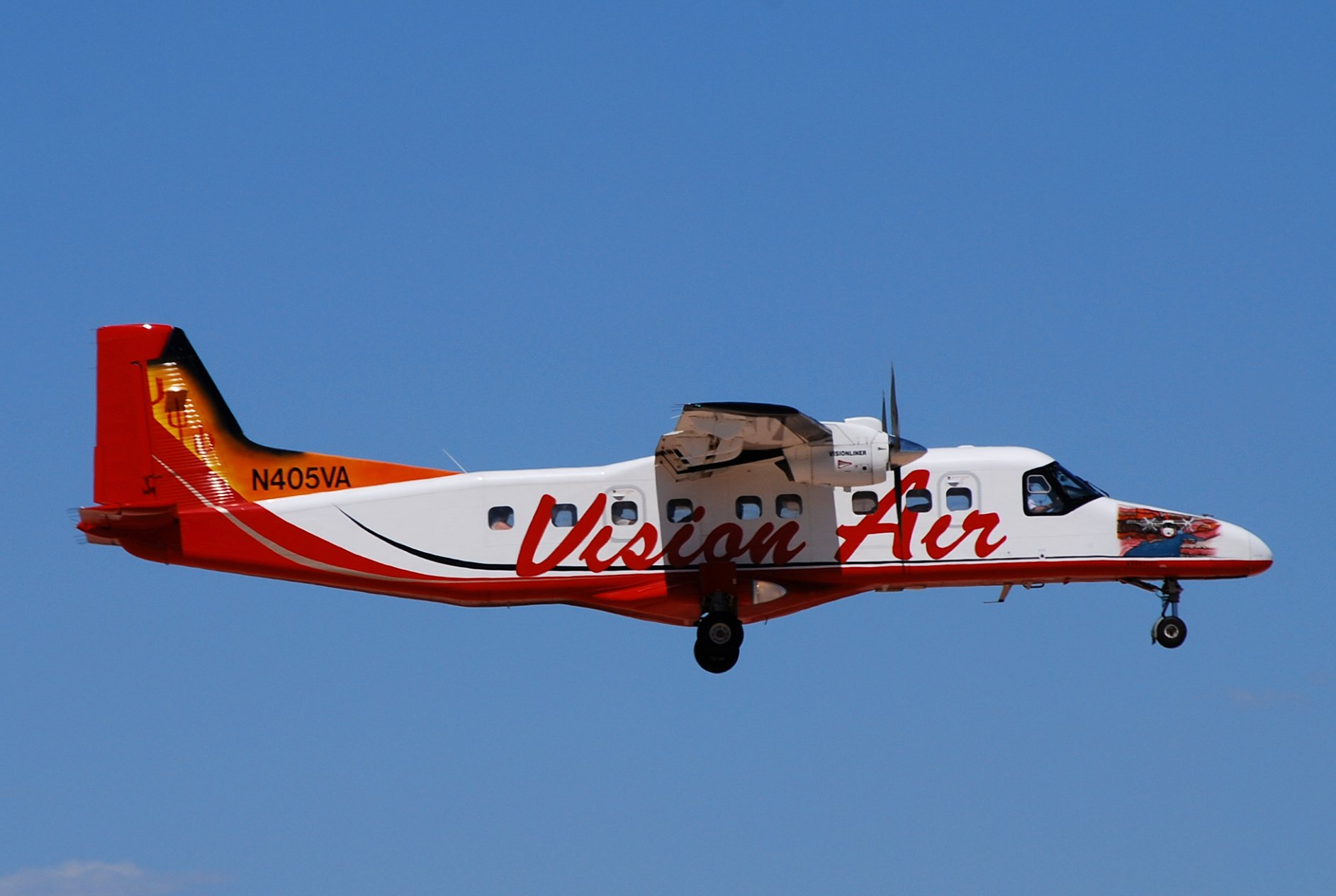
- a Dornier 228 operated by Vision Airlines
| IATA | ICAO | Call sign |
|---|---|---|
| V2 | RBY | RUBY |
- Founded: 1994; 32 years ago (as Vision Air)
- Commenced operations: February 26, 1995; 31 years ago (as a Grand Canyon tour company)
- Ceased operations: May 2017; 9 years ago
- Fleet size: 38
- Destinations: None on a scheduled basis, charter only
- Parent company: Vision Aviation Holdings
- Headquarters: North Las Vegas, Nevada
- Website: http://www.visionairlines.com (apparently a dead link by May 2016)

Vision Airlines, formerly Vision Air, was an airline that had its operations headquartered in North Las Vegas, Nevada.

The airline also operated charter flights for their tour services in northern Arizona and Nevada including the Grand Canyon, Marble Canyon, Hoover Dam, and Monument Valley out of North Las Vegas Airport utilizing Boeing 737 and Dornier 228 aircraft. In addition, during the summer months, Vision Airlines transported white water rafters to various destinations along the Colorado River. They also operated charter service for TravelSpan Vacations to Georgetown, Guyana and Port of Spain, Trinidad and Tobago and were operating Boeing 737 jetliners on behalf of People Express Airlines until this new start-up air carrier ceased all flights.

== History ==
The airline was set up in 1994 as Vision Air.

On January 19, 2011, Vision Airlines announced that it would begin commercial flights to 17 U.S. destinations beginning March 25, 2011, from Northwest Florida Regional Airport (VPS) located near Fort Walton Beach, FL and Destin, FL using Boeing 737 jet and Dornier 328 turboprop aircraft. Vision was operating nonstop flights between its hub at VPS and Asheville, NC; Atlanta, GA; Baton Rouge, LA; Columbia, SC; Fort Lauderdale, FL; Fort Myers, FL; Greenville/Spartanburg, SC; Huntsville, AL; Knoxville, TN; Lafayette, LA; Little Rock, AR; Louisville, KY; Orlando/Sanford, FL; Savannah, GA; Shreveport, LA; St. Louis, MO; St. Petersburg, FL and Tunica, MS. The airline also began operating nonstop Boeing 737 flights between Baton Rouge, Louisiana and Las Vegas, Nevada with these flights being an extension of the Baton Rouge service from the Northwest Florida Regional Airport, but then suspended all service on the route.

On June 16, 2011, Vision Airlines announced new service from Freeport, Bahamas to the United States beginning on November 11, 2011. The scheduled service to and from the Bahamas included new cities of Baltimore, Maryland; Raleigh-Durham, North Carolina; and Richmond, Virginia.

In early 2012, Vision Airlines announced that it would begin commercial flights to 11 U.S. cities beginning May 31, 2012, based in Myrtle Beach International Airport in South Carolina. Eight flights a day were to be operated from Myrtle Beach with Vision's other destinations consisting of flights between St. Petersburg-Clearwater International Airport and Gulfport-Biloxi International Airport. This schedule was effective May 31, 2012, through October 31, 2012.

Throughout 2013, Vision's only scheduled flights were from Gulfport-Biloxi to St. Petersburg and Orlando, Florida. According to the airline's website, these flights have been discontinued and Vision currently does not operate any scheduled passenger service as an independent airline.

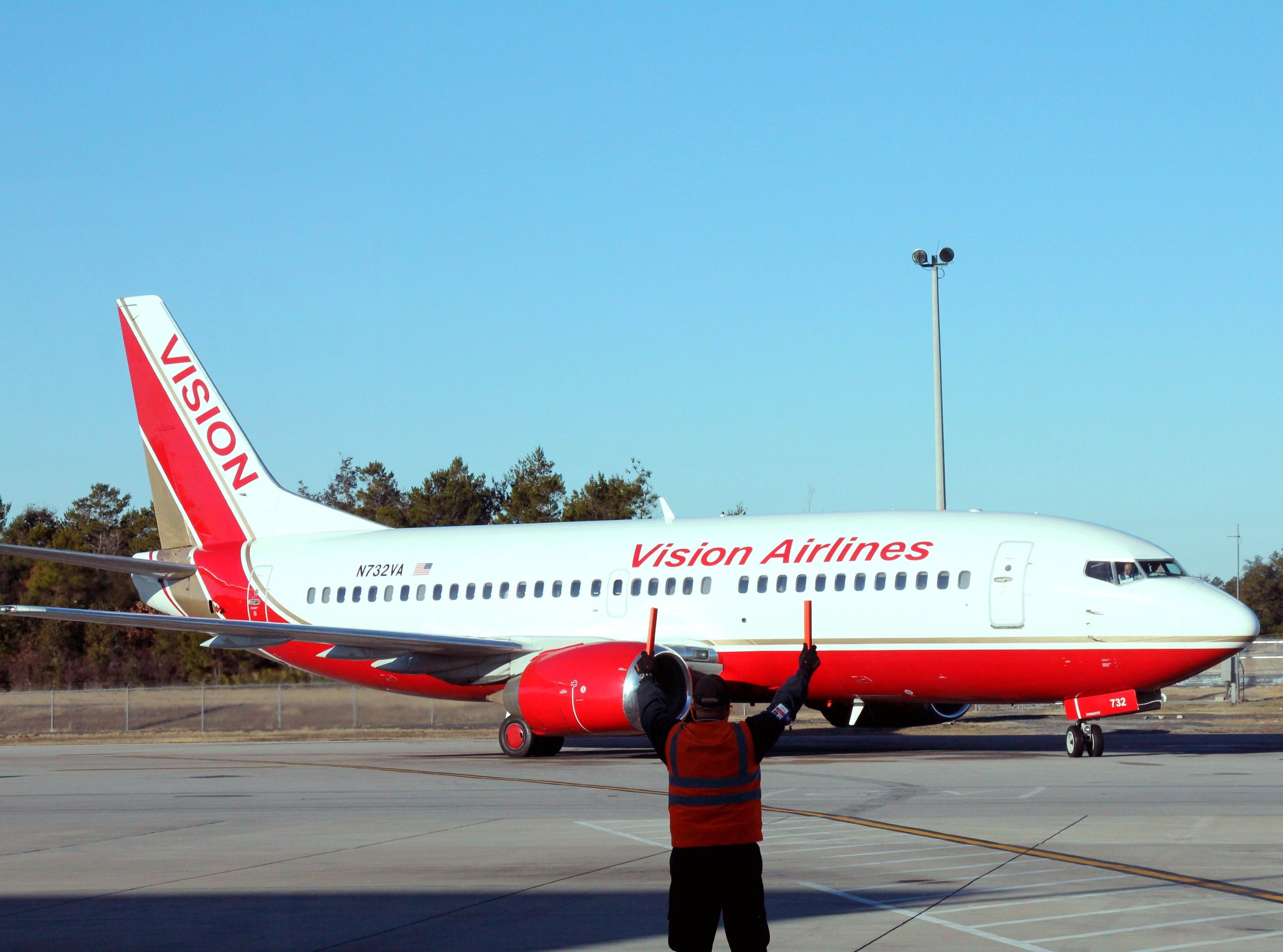
Vision Airlines 737-300

Vision Airlines began operating flights with three Boeing 737-400 jetliners for the new People Express Airlines ("PEOPLExpress") on June 30, 2014 from the start-up airline's hub at Newport News/Williamsburg International Airport (PHF). The original People Express Airlines operated a hub at Newark Liberty International Airport (EWR) from 1981 to 1987 before being merged into Continental Airlines. However, according to a USA Today news article dated September 26, 2014, the new version of People Express then cancelled all flights on this same date and no longer operates any scheduled passenger service.

In November 2014 the airline began charter flights for Sandals Resorts between Toronto and the Bahamas using a Boeing 767-200.

== Fleet ==
As of May 2017, Vision Airlines does not operate any aircraft.

Before ceasing operations, Vision Airlines previously operated the following aircraft:

- 1 - Boeing 737-300
- 4 - Boeing 737-400
- 1 - Boeing 737-800
- 4 - Boeing 767-200
- 1 - Boeing 767-300
- 3 - British Aerospace Jetstream
- 1 - De Havilland Canada Dash 8
- 13 - Dornier 228
- 10 - Dornier 328

== Relief efforts ==
Pilots and flight attendants from Vision Airlines volunteered to fly in supplies and emergency crews to Haiti after the 2010 Haiti earthquake. Vision Airlines loaded planes in Miami and Atlanta with rescue workers, search dogs, water and medicine.

== Spy swap ==
On July 9, 2010, the United States government chartered a Vision Airlines jet to transport ten Russian "illegals" (spies) to Vienna and collect four alleged Western spies in the largest known prisoner swap since the Cold War.

== NASCAR sponsorship ==
In 2011, Vision Airlines sponsored the 15 and 51 trucks (driven by Justin Johnson and Dusty Davis, respectively) in the NASCAR Camping World Truck Series as Vision Aviation Racing.

== Dissolution ==
A Virginia Department of Transportation audit of the loan by Peninsula Airport Commission's to repay a People Express Airlines debt discovered that the airline providing the air service on behalf of People Express (Vision Airlines) had its Virginia Incorporation revoked more than a year earlier.

== See also ==
- List of defunct airlines of the United States
