= Cavalier Hotel =

Historic building in Virginia, US

- U.S. National Register of Historic Places
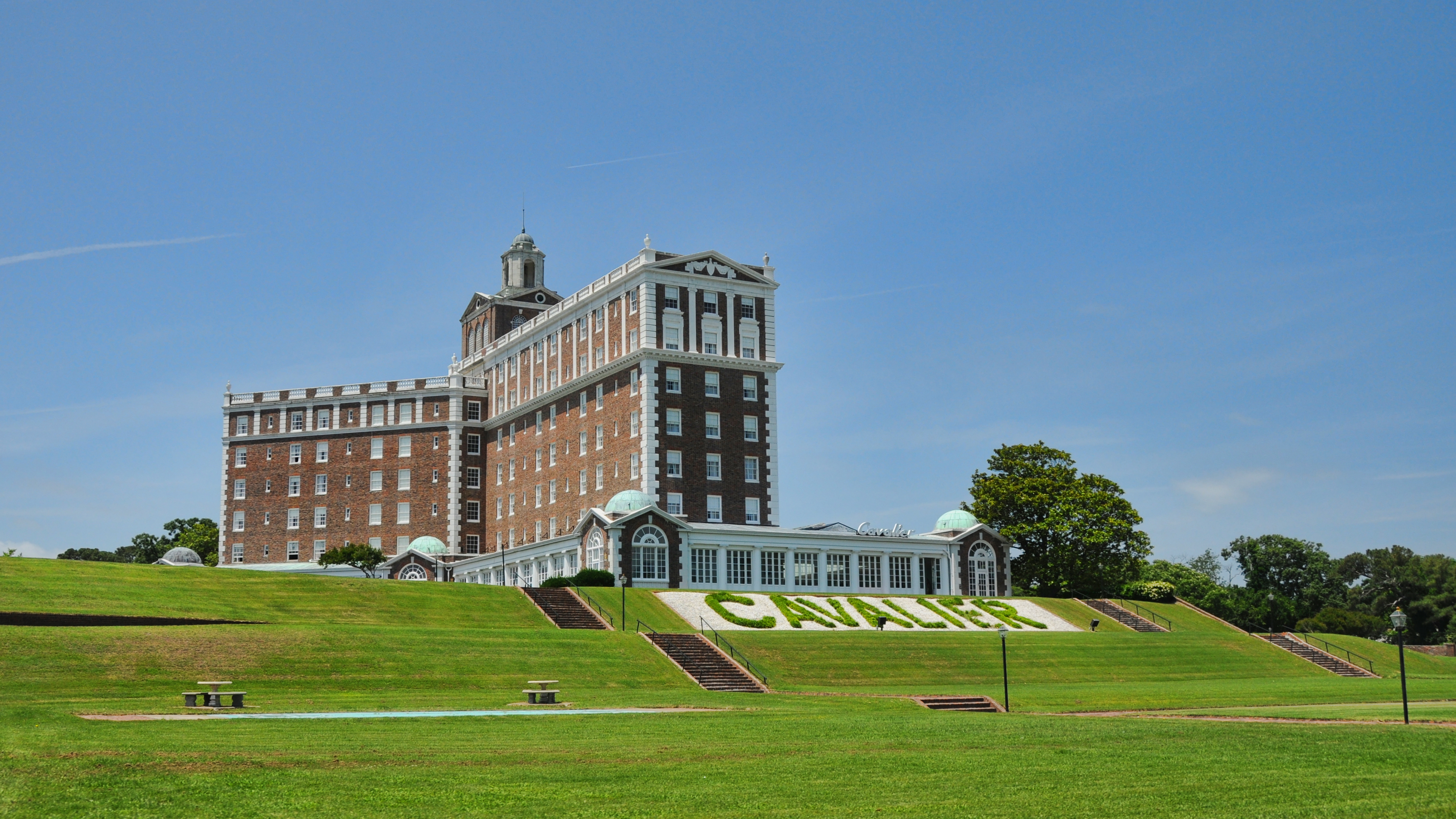
- The Cavalier in 2010

- Location within Virginia Location within the United States
- Location: 4200 Atlantic Ave., Virginia Beach, Virginia
- Coordinates: 36°52′09″N 75°58′58″W
- Area: 5.41 acres (2.19 ha)
- Built: 1927
- Built by: Baker & Brinkley
- Architect: Neff & Thompson
- Architectural style: Renaissance Revival
- NRHP reference No.: 14000239
- Added to NRHP: May 19, 2014

The Cavalier Hotel is a historic hotel building in Virginia Beach, Virginia. The seven-story building was designed by Neff and Thompson with a Y-shaped floor plan and was completed in 1927. Most of its hotel rooms featured views of the Atlantic Ocean, and all had private bathrooms. The hotel also featured dining facilities and opportunities for shopping, as well as amenities such as swimming pools that are now common features of modern hotels.

Cavalier Beach Club opened on the oceanfront at the bottom of the Cavalier Hotel on Memorial Day weekend in 1929, shortly before the stock market crash.

The hotel was built during the period of prosperity known as the Roaring Twenties, and was a major element of the development of Virginia Beach as a resort area. The hotel was operated successfully until 1942, when it was commandeered by the United States Navy as a training center during World War II. It was returned to its owners in 1945, but the lost years hurt the business. The property was used as a private club for a time in the 1950s and 1960s, and eventually reopened as a hotel. A second wing, originally called The New Cavalier and later known as The Cavalier Oceanfront, was constructed on beachfront property owned by the hotel in 1973. The original hotel structure was listed on the National Register of Historic Places in 2014.

The hotel property was sold in 2013 under court order and the new owners began an extensive renovation and restoration of the structure with an anticipated opening of summer 2016. Due to unanticipated repairs, the owners announced in April 2016 that the opening would be delayed until 2017. The additional demolition and work added $24 million to the original $50 million estimate.

On what had been vacant land north of the hotel, the owners constructed a housing development. In 2015, they demolished The Cavalier Oceanfront Hotel and The Cavalier Beach Club, across Atlantic Avenue. It its place they constructed a new Beach Club, which opened in 2018 and two new hotels: the $125M, 305-room Marriott Virginia Beach Oceanfront, which opened in June 2020, and the Embassy Suites by Hilton Virginia Beach Oceanfront Resort, which opened in February 2023.

The Historic Cavalier Hotel reopened Wednesday, March 7, 2018, with 62 rooms and 23 suites, down from the original 135. The hotel also retained 21 of its original 350 acres (140 ha). The renovation took four years and costed $81 million.

In June 2026, the resort complex of three hotels was sold to Connecticut-based Wheelock Street Capital.

== Gallery ==
Aerial view from the southeast in 1985

The Cavalier Oceanfront in 1985; demolished in 2015

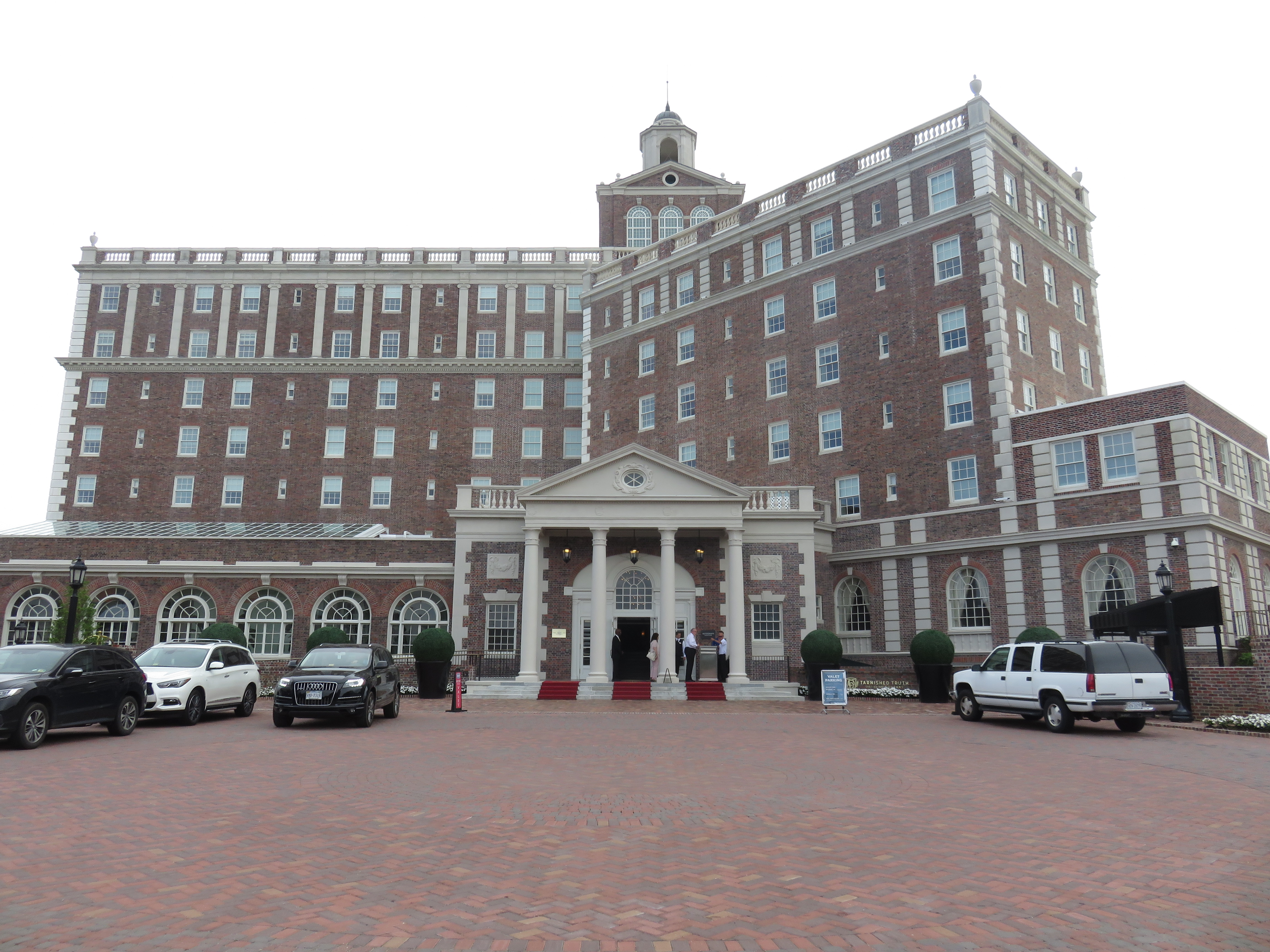
North façade in 2018

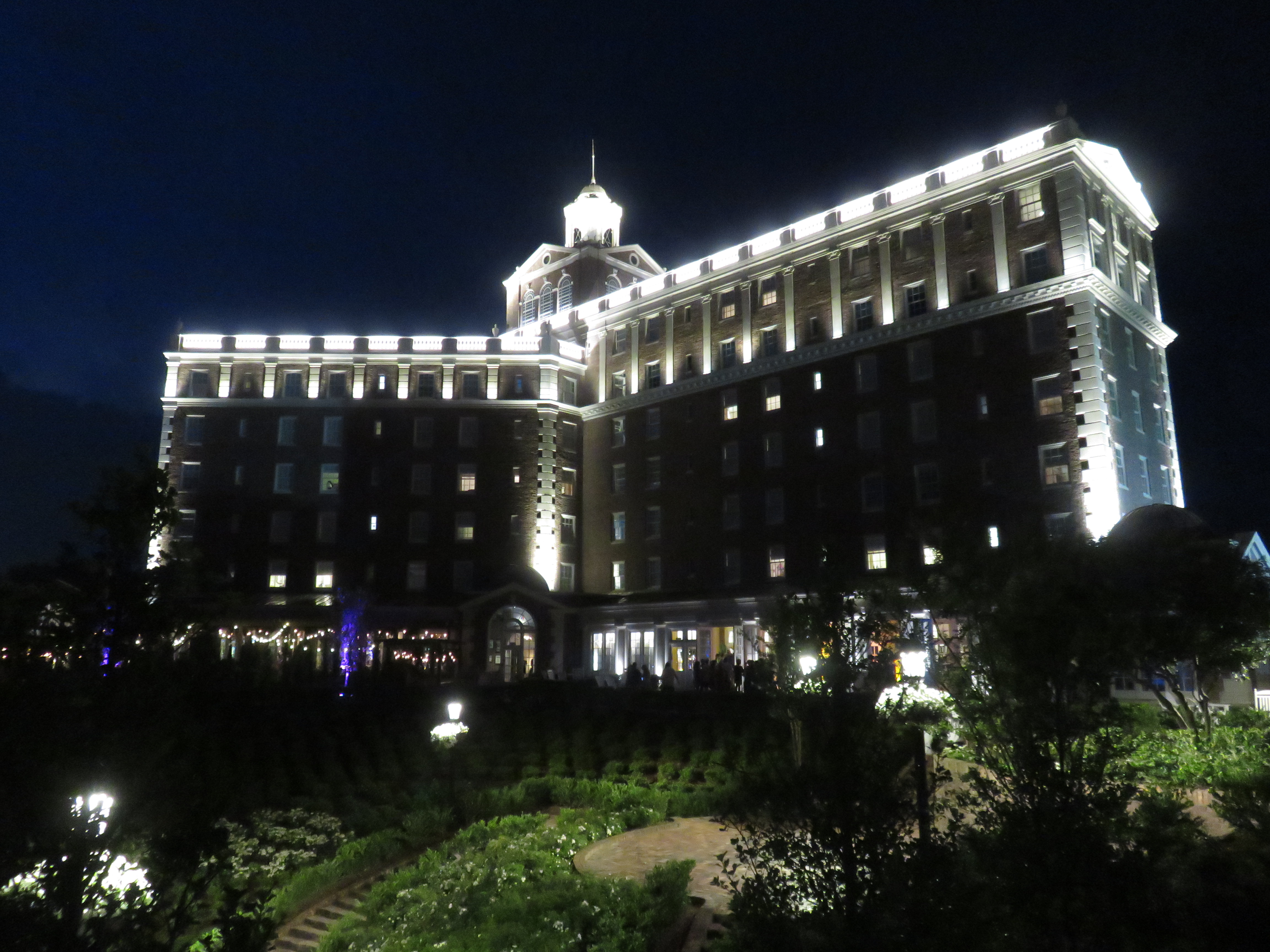
Hotel at night in 2018

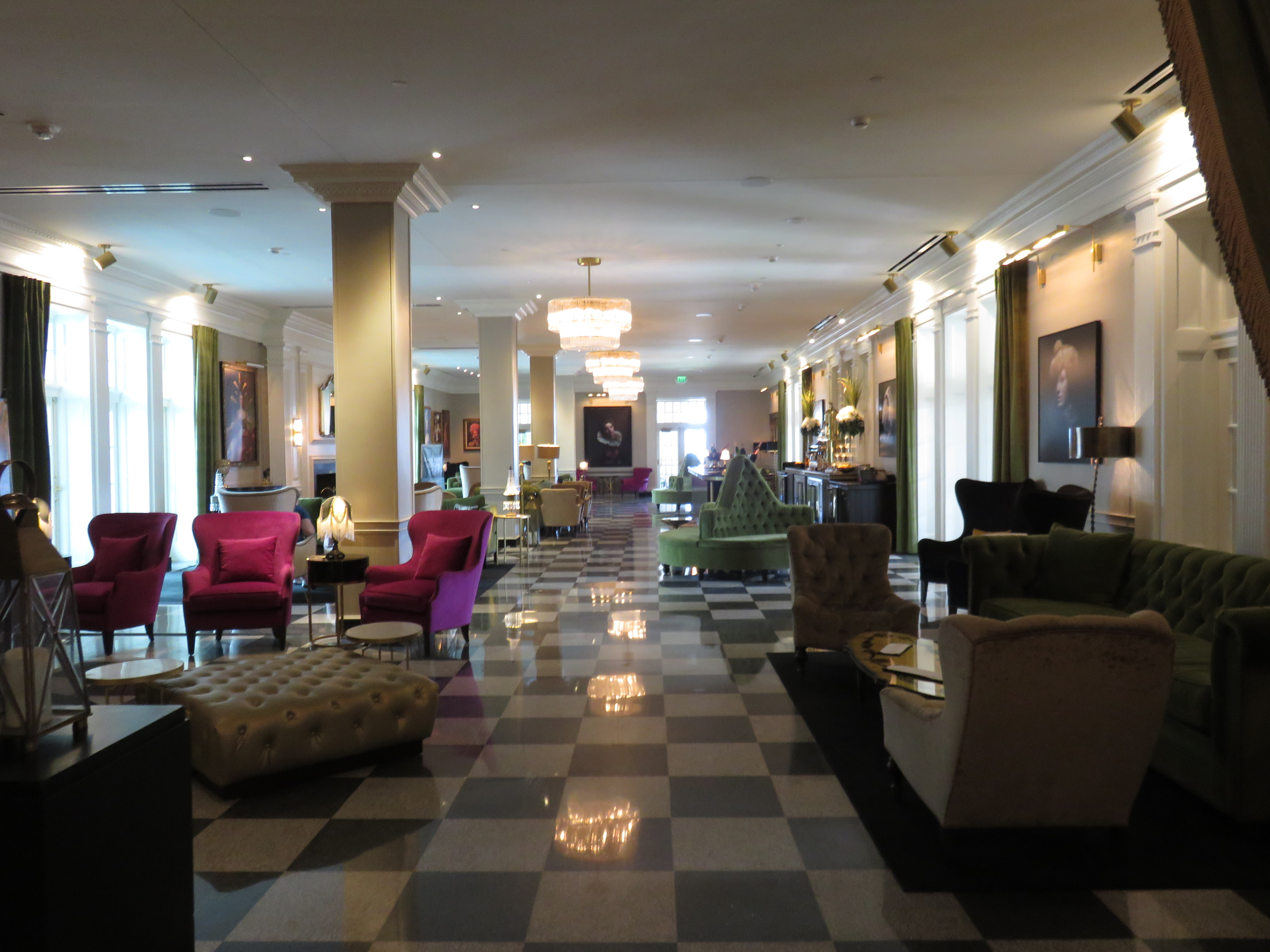
Great room in 2018

Pool in 1985

== See also ==
- List of Historic Hotels of America
- National Register of Historic Places listings in Virginia Beach, Virginia
