= People Express Airlines (2010s) =

Airline of the United States

PEOPLExpress
IATA	ICAO	Call sign
V2 (from Vision Airlines)	RBY (from Vision Airlines)	RUBY (from Vision Airlines)
- Founded: February 13, 2012; 14 years ago
- Commenced operations: June 30, 2014; 12 years ago
- Ceased operations: September 26, 2014; 11 years ago
- Hubs: Newport News/Williamsburg International Airport
- Frequent-flyer program: SMARTbank
- Fleet size: 2
- Destinations: 10
- Headquarters: Newport News, Virginia
- Key people: Jeffrey Erickson (CEO); Michael Morisi (Founder)
- Website: flypex.com

People Express Airlines (stylized as PEOPLExpress) was an airline that began operations on June 30, 2014, from Newport News/Williamsburg International Airport, targeting the no-frills budget flyer. The air carrier took its name from the original PEOPLExpress Airlines which operated in the 1980s but was unrelated. Due to complications with its contracted fleet, including one aircraft having been hit by a ground vehicle, the airline abruptly ceased operations on September 26, 2014, leaving some passengers stranded and others holding tickets that were not transferable to other carriers. Its hub airport located in Newport News commenced eviction of the airline from the airport terminal on November 12, 2014. On January 22, 2015, People Express Airlines was evicted from its offices at the Newport News/Williamsburg International Airport.

== History ==
=== Beginnings ===
The airline was publicly launched during a press conference at the Newport News airport on February 13, 2012, though its organization began in April 2011 when Michael Morisi, an official at the original People Express Airlines and chief operating officer for the revived company, began bringing together a group of people to start the company. People Express received financing from private investors and Newport News area businesses.

Service was initially anticipated to begin late-2013, but several delays caused the launch date to push back to mid-2014. People Express had initially intended to acquire Xtra Airways in order to expedite the airline's certification process, but the deal was never finalized due to issues identified during the due diligence process. On October 5, Jeffrey Erickson, former Atlas Air President and CEO was announced as PEOPLExpress' first CEO.

== Start of operations ==
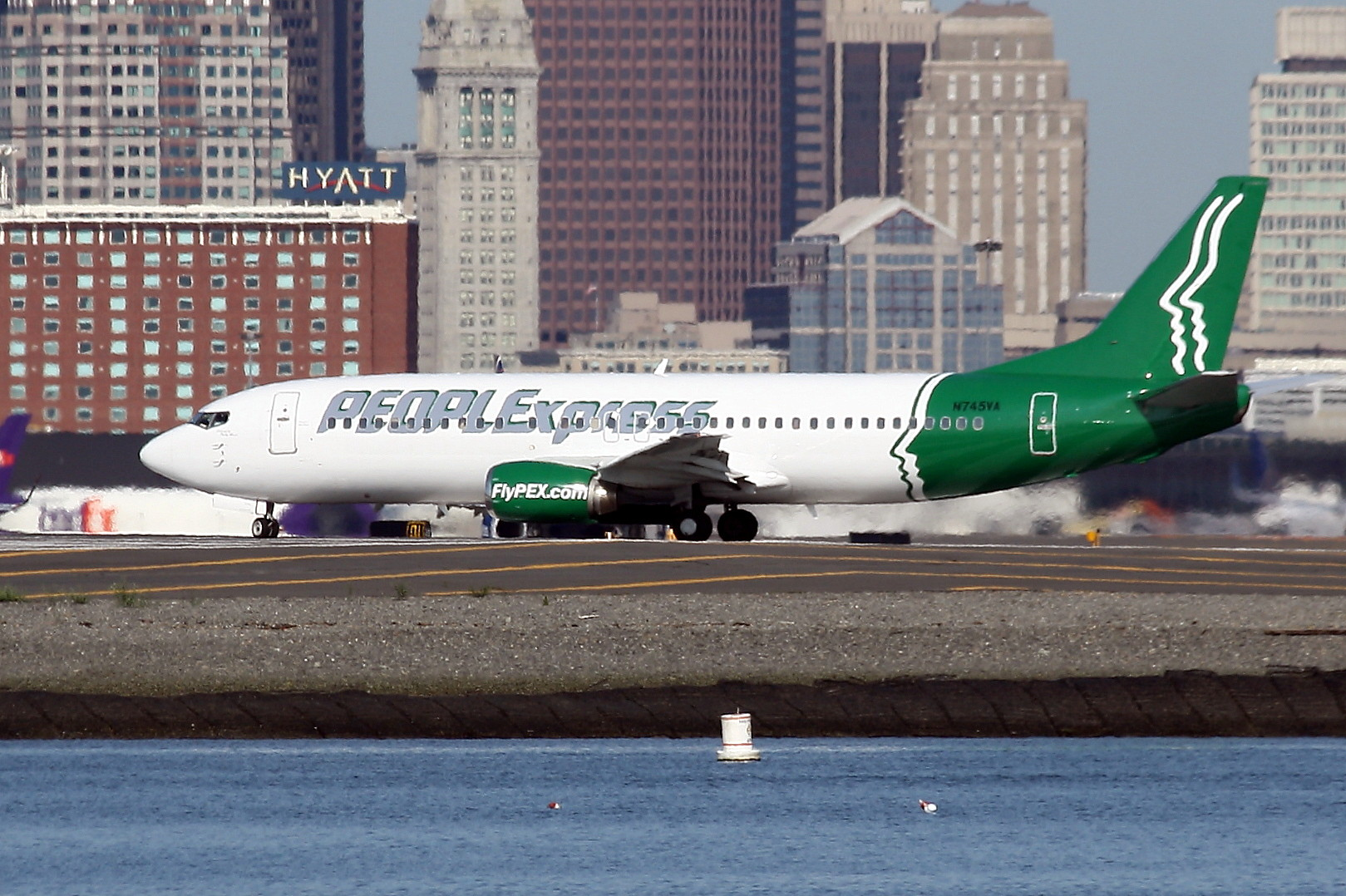
PEOPLExpress Boeing 737-400 N745VA lines up for take-off at Boston's Logan International Airport (July 2014)

At a press event on May 30, 2014, PEX announced that flight operations would commence on June 30, 2014. Flights were operated by Vision Airlines doing business as PEOPLExpress. The airline utilized Vision Airlines' existing USDOT scheduled authority and FAA Part 121 certification. People Express had planned on obtaining its own FAA certification and begin operating independently within the next few years.

The airline's business model was to operate to niche markets, largely in the eastern United States, that were underserved or unserved by mainline airlines while charging about 40% less than typical fares. The airline's base and hub were located at Newport News/Williamsburg International Airport (PHF) in Newport News, VA. The airport was previously served by AirTran in 2012 and Allegiant Air in 2014; however, both airlines then ceased serving Newport News. In addition, the airport had previously received jet service over the years operated by Allegheny Airlines, National Airlines, Piedmont Airlines (1948-1989) and United Airlines as well as USAir and its successor US Airways.

== End of operations ==
On September 26, 2014, the airline announced what it expected to be a temporary suspension of all service until October 16, 2014. According to CEO Jeff Erickson, the airline was forced to suspend operations when both of its aircraft were incapacitated. A vendor's truck crashed into one plane on September 17, and the second was forced out of service on September 26 due to an unspecified maintenance issue.

The airline subsequently announced that it would not resume operations on October 16, 2014, and on November 12, 2014, PEOPLExpress was evicted from the Newport News/Williamsburg International Airport due to non-payment of Passenger Facilities Charges of US$100,000. On January 22, 2015, People Express Airlines was evicted from its office space at the Newport News/Williamsburg International Airport due to non-payment of utility bills.

In July 2019, Michael Morisi pleaded guilty to fraud charges in relation to the collapse of the airline. On February 21, 2020, he was jailed for two years.

== Destinations ==
People Express served or planned to serve the following destinations in the United States:

State	City	Airport	Refs
Florida	Orlando	Orlando International Airport	
Florida	St. Petersburg	St. Petersburg–Clearwater International Airport	
Florida	West Palm Beach	Palm Beach International Airport	
(Georgia (U.S. state)) Georgia	Atlanta	Hartsfield–Jackson Atlanta International Airport	
Louisiana	New Orleans	Louis Armstrong New Orleans International Airport	
Massachusetts	Boston	Logan International Airport	
New Jersey	Newark	Newark Liberty International Airport	
Pennsylvania	Pittsburgh	Pittsburgh International Airport	
Virginia	Newport News	Newport News/Williamsburg International Airport - Hub	
West Virginia	Charleston	Yeager Airport	

== Historical fleet ==
People Express operated as a virtual airline exclusively flying Boeing 737-400 aircraft operated by Vision Airlines including Vision Airlines flight crew. The aircraft were configured with 150 (12/138) seats.

Aircraft		Passengers				Notes
Aircraft		F	C	Y	Total	Notes
Boeing 737-400	2	12	—	138	150	Operated By Vision Airlines
Total	2					

== Frequent flyer program ==
People Express' frequent flier program was called SMARTbank, and it also operated Club Travelati, a group for customers to receive special discounts. In May 2012, the airline was fined by the United States Department of Transportation for violating a ban on premature advertising in connection with its solicitation for memberships in Club Travelati, of which the airline claimed to have sold over 130 before suspending sales at the end of March 2012.

== See also ==
- List of defunct airlines of the United States
