= Newport News/Williamsburg International Airport =

Newport News/Williamsburg Airport Patrick Henry Field

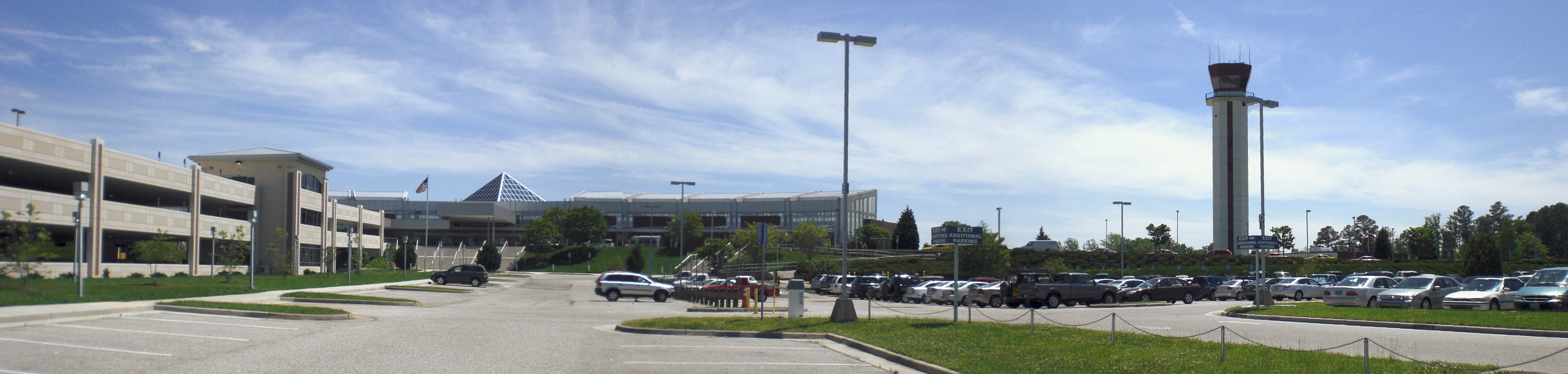
- IATA: PHF; ICAO: KPHF; FAA LID: PHF

Summary
- Airport type: Public
- Owner: The Peninsula Airport Commission
- Serves: Virginia Peninsula; Hampton Roads
- Location: Newport News, Virginia
- Elevation AMSL: 42 ft / 13 m
- Coordinates: 37°07′55″N 76°29′35″W
- Website: newportnewsairport.com

Maps
- FAA airport diagram
- Interactive map of Newport News/Williamsburg Airport

Runways
Direction	Length		Surface
Direction	ft	m	Surface
7/25	8,003	2,439	Asphalt
2/20	6,526	1,989	Concrete

Newport News-Williamsburg Airport (IATA: PHF, ICAO: KPHF, FAA LID: PHF) is in Newport News, Virginia, United States, and serves the Hampton Roads area along with Norfolk International Airport in Norfolk. The airport is owned and operated by the Peninsula Airport Commission, a political subdivision of the Commonwealth of Virginia. PHF covers 1,800 acres (728 ha).

In 2019, the airport handled 431,077 passengers, while in 2023 it handled 144,966 passengers. The loss of dominant air carrier AirTran in 2012 and competition from low-cost airlines at Richmond International Airport and Norfolk International Airport has led to a drop of more than 85% in the annual number of passengers at PHF since 2011.

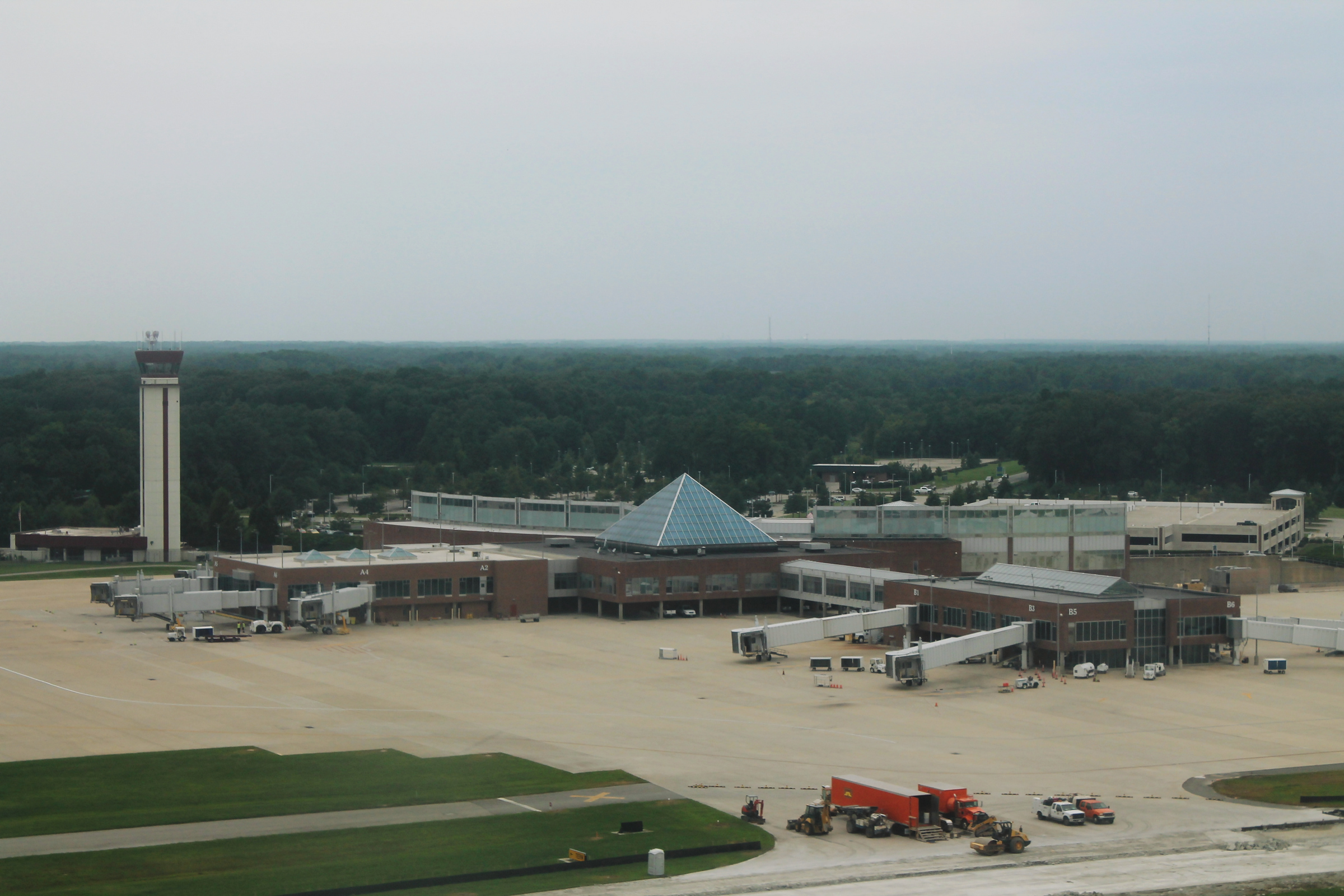
View of terminal building

== History ==
In 1946, Virginia's General Assembly passed legislation creating the Peninsula Airport Commission (PAC) to determine a location for and establish a new airport for the cities of Newport News and Hampton. An agreement was reached with the US War Asset Administration in 1947 to transfer 924 acres (3.7 km^{2}) of the former Camp Patrick Henry, a World War II US Army base, to the PAC as the site for the new airport. A Nike missile air defense base, known as N-85, still exists on the property, though abandoned since the mid-1960s.

The airport was originally named Patrick Henry Airport, its code PHF representing Patrick Henry Field. The first runway was 2–20, a 3,500-foot (1,100 m) runway, followed by 6–24 (later redesignated as 7–25). Airline service began in November 1949 on Piedmont Airlines and Capital Airlines.

In 1951 the passenger terminal was damaged by a fire. An upgraded traffic control tower was built and Runway 6–24 was extended to 5,000 feet (1,500 m) in 1952; a new passenger terminal opened in 1955.

National Airlines arrived at PHF in 1955 and by 1964 was operating all of its flights from the airport with Lockheed L-188 Electra turboprops with service to Washington DC National Airport, New York JFK Airport, New York Newark Airport, Baltimore, Philadelphia and nearby Norfolk. Allegheny Airlines (later renamed USAir) arrived in 1966. United Airlines (which had acquired and merged with Capital Airlines), National, Allegheny and Piedmont all operated jets to PHF with the first jets being operated by National with Boeing 727s in 1966 (runway 6 had been extended from 5600 to 6100 ft by then). Both runways were extended to their current lengths of 6526 feet (1989 m) Runway 2–20, and 8003 feet (2439 m) Runway 7–25.

The airport became Patrick Henry International Airport in 1975. According to the Official Airline Guide, four airlines were serving the airport in early 1976 with nonstop or direct, no change of plane flights including Allegheny with McDonnell Douglas DC-9-30 jets from Boston, Hartford, Philadelphia and Providence; National with Boeing 727-100 and Boeing 727-200 jets from New York JFK Airport, Washington DC National Airport and nearby Norfolk; Piedmont with NAMC YS-11 turboprops from Atlanta, Columbus, OH, Florence, SC, New Bern, NC, Norfolk, Parkersburg, WV, Richmond, VA, Roanoke, VA and Washington DC National Airport; and United with Boeing 727-100 and Boeing 737-200 jets from Atlanta, Chicago O'Hare Airport, Moline, IL and Washington DC National Airport. A US Customs facility was added to the terminal to allow international arrivals (airline and corporate). The airport currently covers 1,800 acres (7.3 km^{2}), most of it in the city of Newport News and nearly half of the airfield with runways 20 and 25 in York County.

When the United States Congress deregulated the airlines in 1978, many airlines serving Patrick Henry Airport consolidated their southeast Virginia services at other airports, and Patrick Henry International Airport lost most of its jet service. National pulled out in 1978. In late 1978, Piedmont was operating Boeing 737-200 jets nonstop to New York JFK Airport, one stop Boeing 737-200 jets to New York LaGuardia Airport via Norfolk, and also nonstop NAMC YS-11 turboprops to Washington National Airport but was no longer serving the airport by the fall of 1979. Allegheny Commuter had replaced Allegheny jet service by this same time in 1979 with code sharing flights then being operated with small commuter Beechcraft and Short 330 turboprop aircraft. Also by the fall of 1979, United was the only airline operating mainline jet service into the airport with Boeing 727-200 and Boeing 737-200 flights nonstop from Chicago O'Hare Airport, Washington DC National Airport, Baltimore and nearby Norfolk; however, United then ceased serving the airport with mainline jets in 1981. United Express operated code sharing flights on behalf of United from the late 1980s through the 1990s with British Aerospace BAe Jetstream 31 and Embraer EMB-120 Brasilia turboprops with nonstop service from the United hub located at Washington DC Dulles Airport. The airport led the nation in air service decline after deregulation and was facing severe financial difficulty.

The turnaround began with the hiring of Charles J. Blankenship as executive director in 1984. Blankenship implemented a strategic plan of developing a business park named Patrick Henry Commerce Center and a marketing campaign to attract air carriers. By 1985 the airport had the distinction of being America's fastest-growing airport. That success was repeated in 1986.

On December 19, 1980, the Daily Press reported a committee authorized by the PAC recommended that the airport change its name to "Newport News/Williamsburg International" to then-Executive Director Michael White. This change would not take place until ten years later. At the time, the Commission members represented the cities of Newport News, Hampton, and Williamsburg, as well as James City County and York County. Since 2010, the Commission consists of six commissioners who are appointed by the cities of Hampton (2) and Newport News (4).

In 1985 USAir (later renamed US Airways) added McDonnell Douglas DC-9-30 and British Aircraft Corporation BAC One-Eleven jets from Pittsburgh and Washington, DC Dulles Airport and by late 1989 these flights were the only jet service at the airport. In the fall of 1989, Emerald Air was operating Douglas DC-9-10 jets nonstop from Orlando twice a week. In the spring of 1995, USAir was operating DC-9-30 as well as Fokker F28 Fellowship jets into the airport with nonstop flights from Charlotte and Pittsburgh; however, this jet service was then discontinued later in 1995. US Airways Express (replaced later by American Eagle following the merger of American Airlines and US Airways) later served Philadelphia and Charlotte from the airport. AirTran started jet service from the airport to Atlanta in 1995, but pulled out in March 2012. In 1999, AirTran was serving the airport with four daily nonstop flights from Atlanta operated with McDonnell Douglas DC-9-30 jets. Delta Connection began service from Newport News to Atlanta in February 2002.

The PAC renamed the facility Newport News/Williamsburg International Airport in September 1990. A new terminal opened in late 1992.

Until the 1990s, part of the original terminal building was named the Flight Services Building and was home to the local office of the National Weather Service (NWS). Weather reports and emergency alerts were broadcast on radio stations and weather frequencies during severe weather directly from the NWS office located at the airport.

When the original control tower was shut down in July 2007 with the opening of the 147 ft (45 m) tall new tower, it had been the oldest operating control tower on the east coast, in continuous service for 55 years.

=== Expansion (2005–2012) ===
The airport launched an expansion effort in the early 21st century. A new air traffic control tower was completed in July 2007, replacing the 1951 tower. A new three-level parking garage opened in June 2007. In 2009, more parking lots were completed to handle increased rental car fleets; parking capacity was estimated at 3,000 vehicles.

As of 2011, the airport was the third fastest-growing airport in the United States and the 118th largest airport. The year 2010 was its best ever, with about 1.063 million passengers. The passenger count was down slightly in 2011, with about 1.059 million passengers.

In January 2011 Delta Air Lines introduced two more daily flights to Atlanta on 142-seat McDonnell Douglas MD-88s for a total of four flights a day. Delta service with Airbus A320s began later in the year and in 2012 Delta replaced its early morning Bombardier CRJ900 regional jet departure to Atlanta with mainline McDonnell Douglas MD-80 service.

Frontier Airlines began nonstop service from Newport News in 2010 as the airport was finishing a $23 million renovation. Initial service included four direct flights a week to Denver with 128-seat Airbus A318s, replaced within weeks with larger Airbus A319 jets.

Beginning May 13, 2011, Frontier flights were operated with 162-seat Airbus A320s; as of September 12, 2011, Frontier was operating seasonal service. On February 4, 2012, PAC announced that Frontier would resume year-round flights operating daily effective May 22 through Labor Day that year. After Labor Day, Frontier planned to operate six days per week. However, on January 6, 2015, Frontier Airlines withdrew all services from Newport News.

Allegiant Airlines also began jet service to the airport with flights to Orlando Sanford Airport but then ceased serving the airport by 2012.

Concourse A opened in May 2010 as the airport's second concourse. Concourse A is designed with a full-service customs facility for larger jets. A local contractor donated $50,000 worth of labor and materials to expand the airport's USO office in 2010, doubling it in size to better serve military personnel.

Elite Airways announced intention to begin service with flights from PHF to Myrtle Beach, SC in 2018, but scrapped the plans due to doubts and concerns about airport operations following the failure of a reincarnation of People Express Airlines (2010s) (which was based in Newport News and attempted to operate a small hub at the airport with Boeing 737-400 jets) and multiple investigations into the airport as well as a perceived lack of passenger demand.

=== Decline in service (2012–present) ===
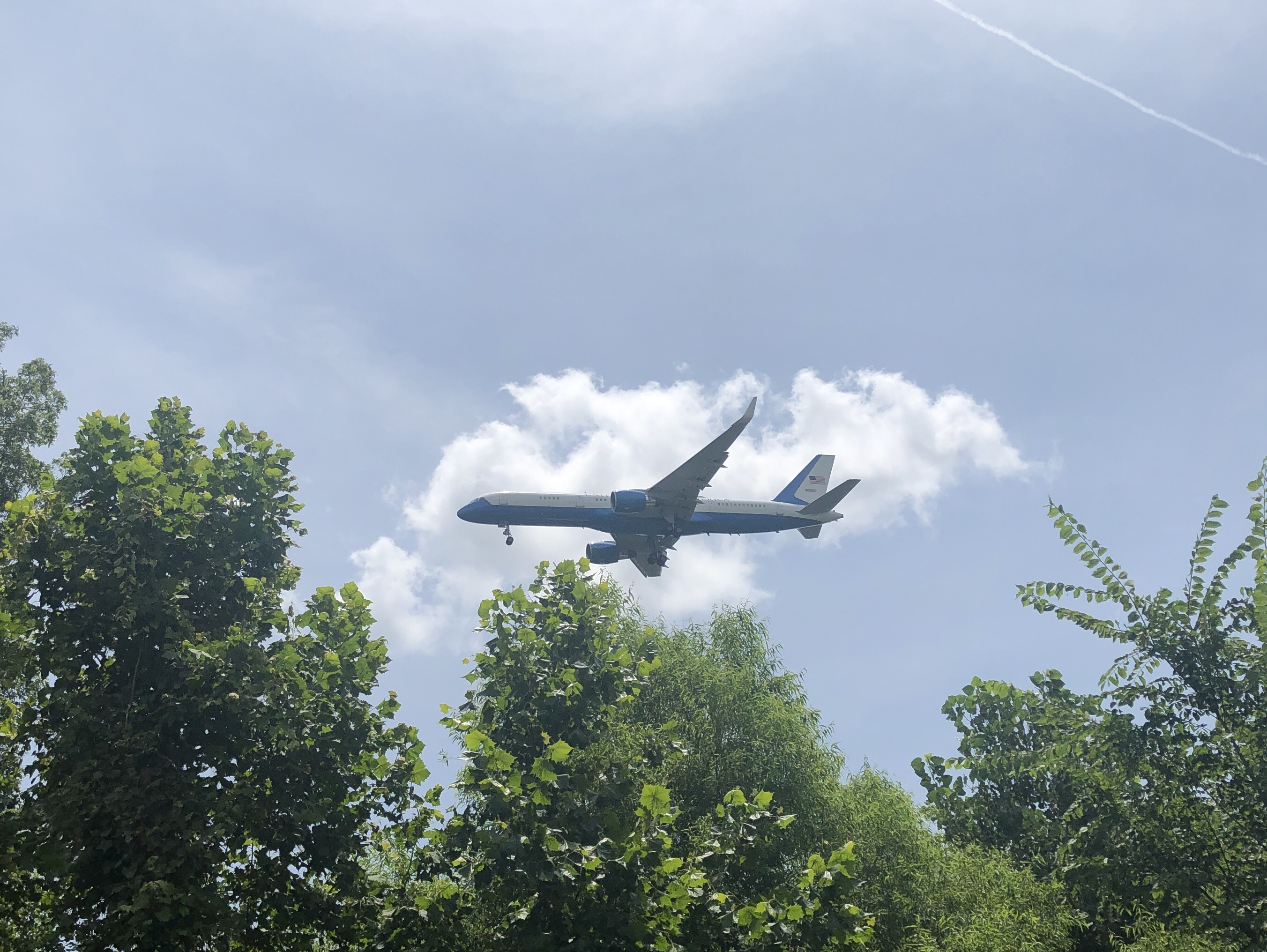
Boeing C-32 (USAF version of the Boeing 757-200) landing at Newport News/Williamsburg International

On March 9, 2012, PHF's longtime largest airline AirTran Airways ceased operations at the airport due to their merger with Southwest Airlines (which was already serving nearby Norfolk International Airport). Passenger count declined in 2012 after the departure of AirTran, with layoffs at the airport announced in May 2012 including police officers, all police dispatchers and other staff.

The airport is home to three Fixed-Base operators: Rick Aviation, Atlantic Aviation and Orion Air Group, which are now Tempus Jets. In January 2013, Mid Atlantic Aviation was also located at the airport, as well as Epix Aviation. Rick and Atlantic provide flight instruction schools, and jet fuel services to private and commercial airplanes. Atlantic Aviation handles international chartered flights. Rick Aviation continues to operate inside the original passenger terminal, sharing space with Denbigh High School's Aviation Academy (serving over 350 high school students). As Orion Air Group opened a new world headquarters 40,000-square-foot (3,700 m^{2}) facility which will employ 100 people; they are already planning an additional 70,000-square-foot (6,500 m^{2}) expansion. Additionally, in 2011 Tidewater Flight Center opened a second location at the airport, providing flight instruction from the original terminal building. Also sharing the original terminal building is a local squadron of the Civil Air Patrol, which maintains several CAP airplanes at the airport.

Newport News–Williamsburg is the first airport in the nation to undergo a sustainability project, to incorporate green technology in every facet of operations.

In January 2014, Concourse A began to add a Federal Inspection Station and fully implement a U.S. Customs processing facility. In 2020, additional administrative staff members were laid off from positions due to declining revenue and impacts from the COVID-19 pandemic.

In May 2020, in response to the COVID-19 pandemic, Delta suspended its thrice daily service to Atlanta. Delta has announced no plans to restore the flights.

In July 2022, Avelo Airlines announced new service from the airport. The airline began flights to Orlando and Fort Lauderdale in October 2022. However, in February 2023, Avelo Airlines announced it would be ending its service at the airport starting April 16, 2023, leaving American Airlines as the sole carrier servicing the airport. The decline in service and passenger volume created a challenging financial environment for the airport. Between 2022 and 2023, the airport reported $4.2 million in financial losses, with public funding required to keep it financially solvent. A June 2024 report recommended a transition away from commercial air service and reorienting efforts to attracting advanced aerospace research and development facilities.

== Airline and destination ==
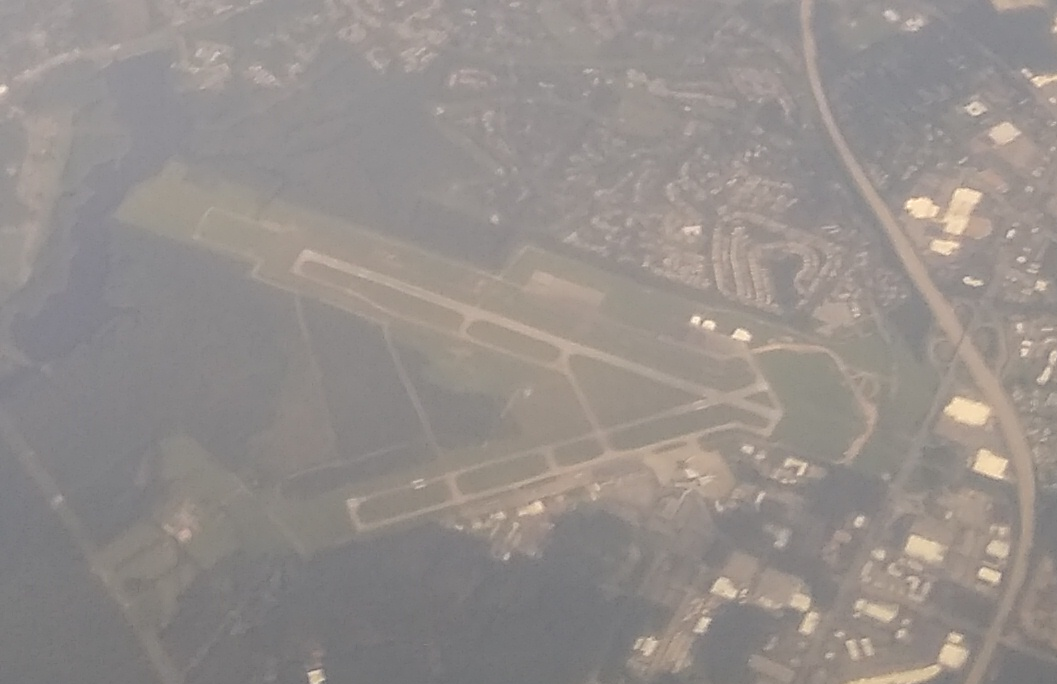
Aerial view

=== Passenger ===
Airlines	Destinations	Refs
American Eagle	Charlotte	

American Eagle service at the airport is currently operated with Canadair CRJ-700 and Embraer ERJ-145 regional jets on behalf of American Airlines via a code sharing agreement.

== Ground transportation ==
=== Taxi ===
The airport is served by various taxi companies.

=== Bus ===
Hampton Roads Transit directly serves the airport with regional bus service at two bus stops; the airport is on HRT Route 116 and is the only Hampton Roads airport with direct bus service. Shuttle and limousine companies also service the airport through pre-arranged appointments. Four car rental agencies can be found at the airport: National, Enterprise, Avis and Budget.

=== Train ===
Amtrak Northeast Regional trains also now serve the airport via the new Newport News Transportation Center station, 1.5 miles to the southwest of the airport grounds and accessible via Bland Boulevard.

== Accidents and incidents ==
On March 26, 2007, a Learjet 36 suffered engine damage after debris was sucked into the engines. The plane attempted to stop but overran the runway and crashed into a field. Both occupants were uninjured.
