= Norfolk, Virginia =

Norfolk
- Independent city
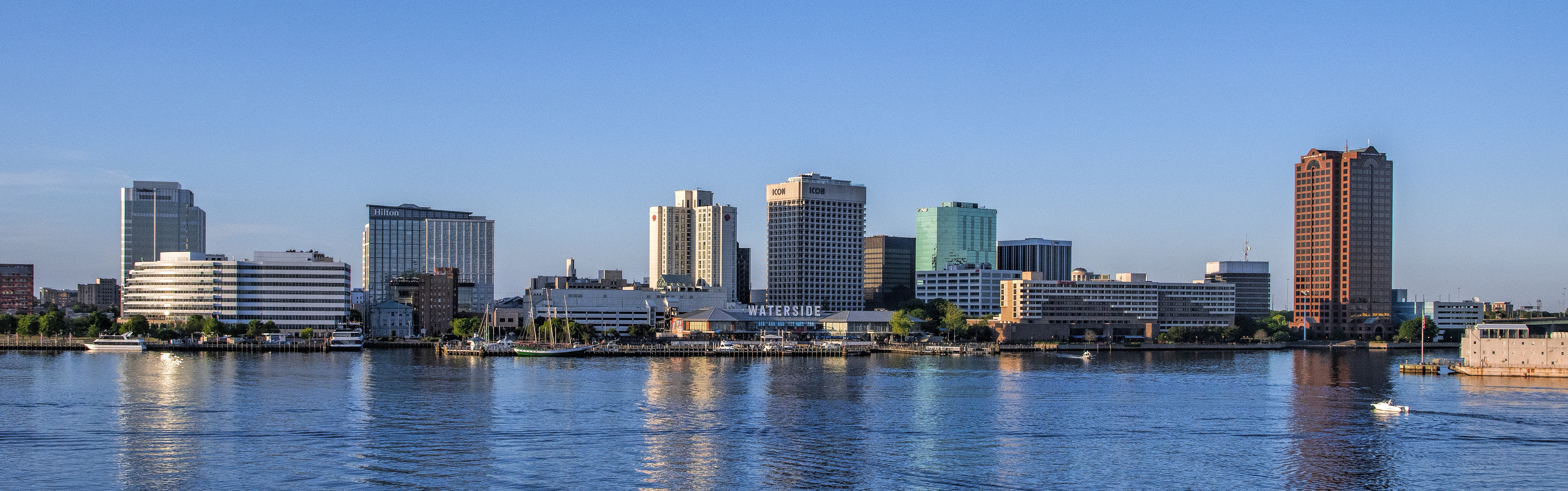
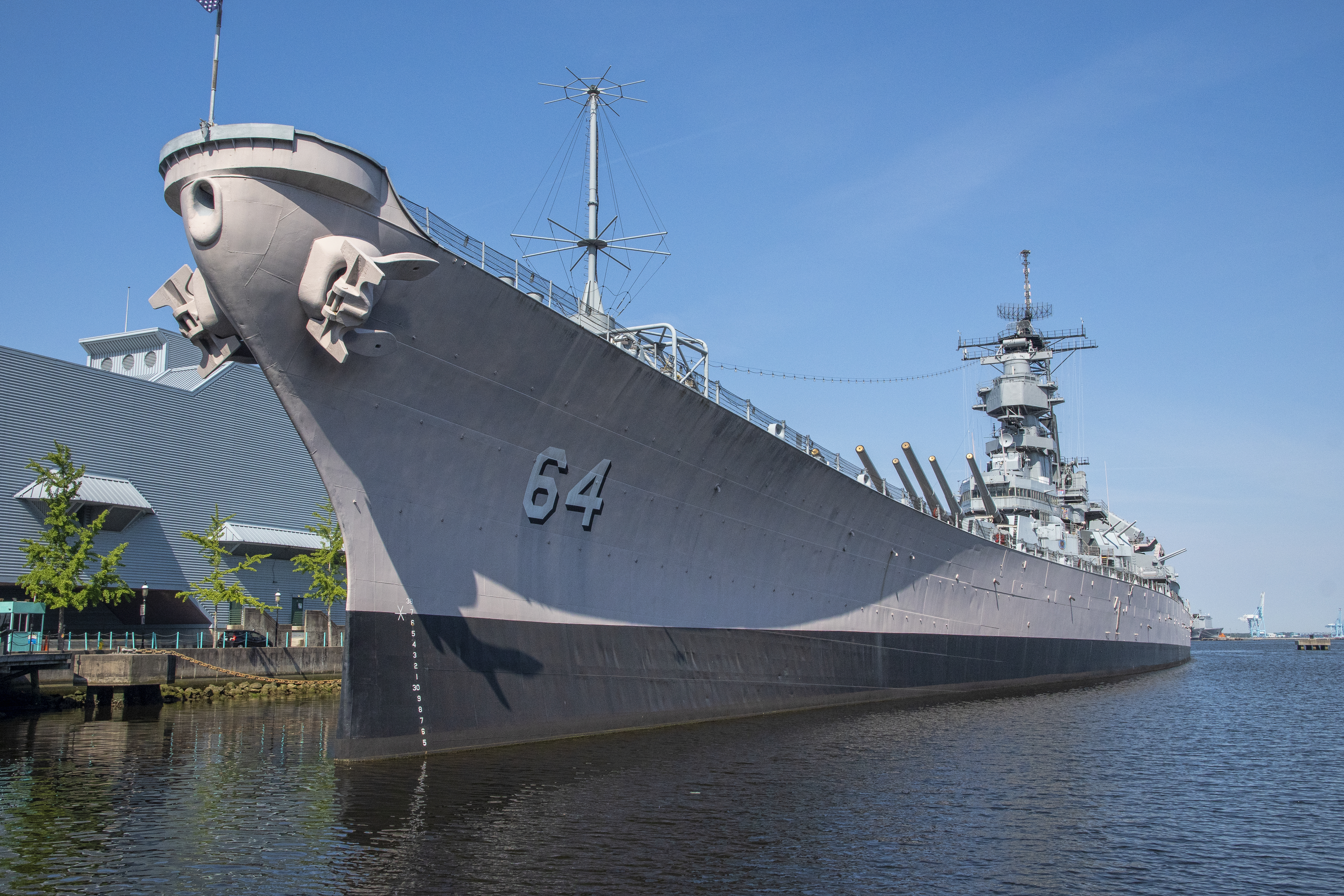
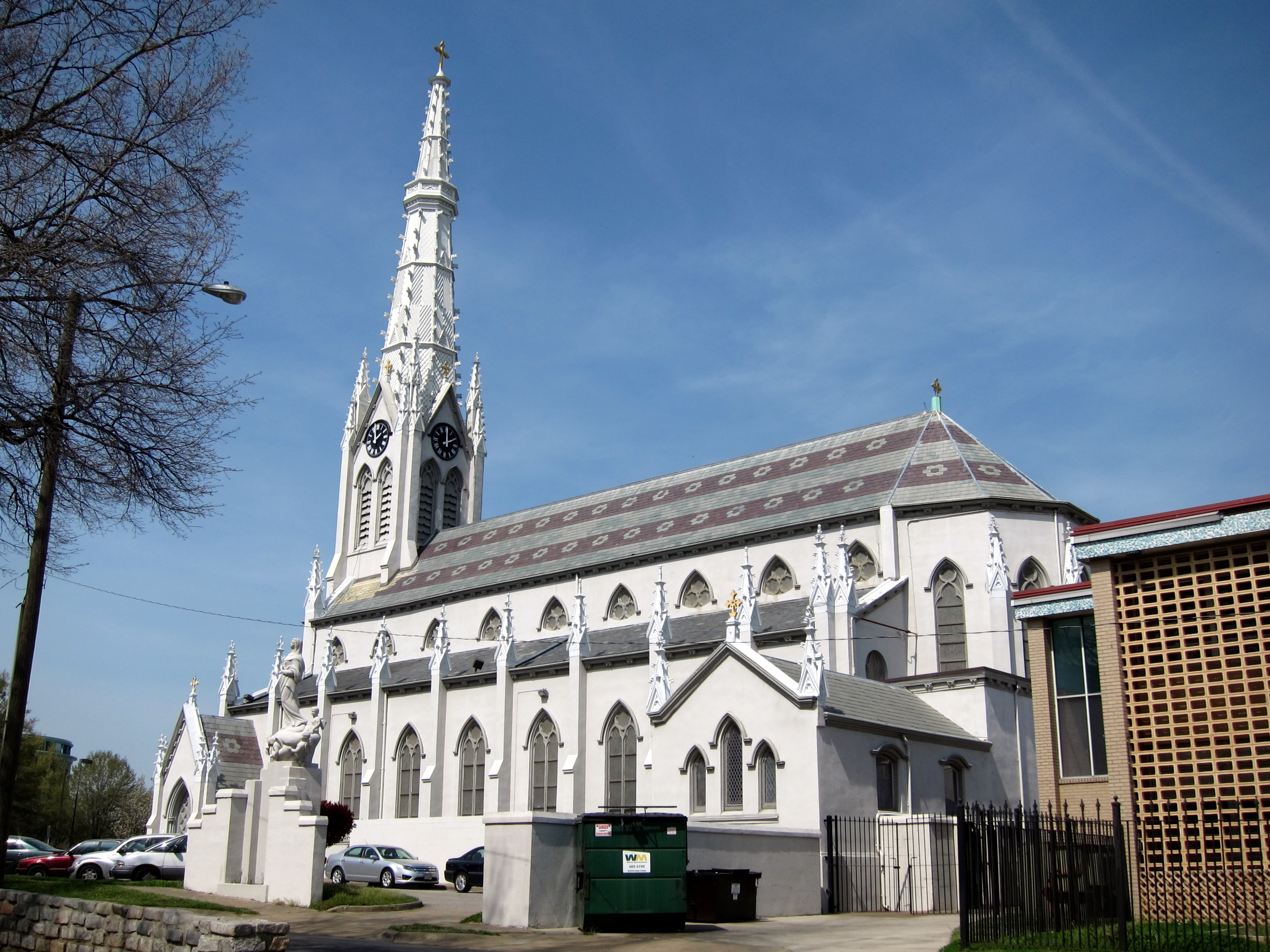
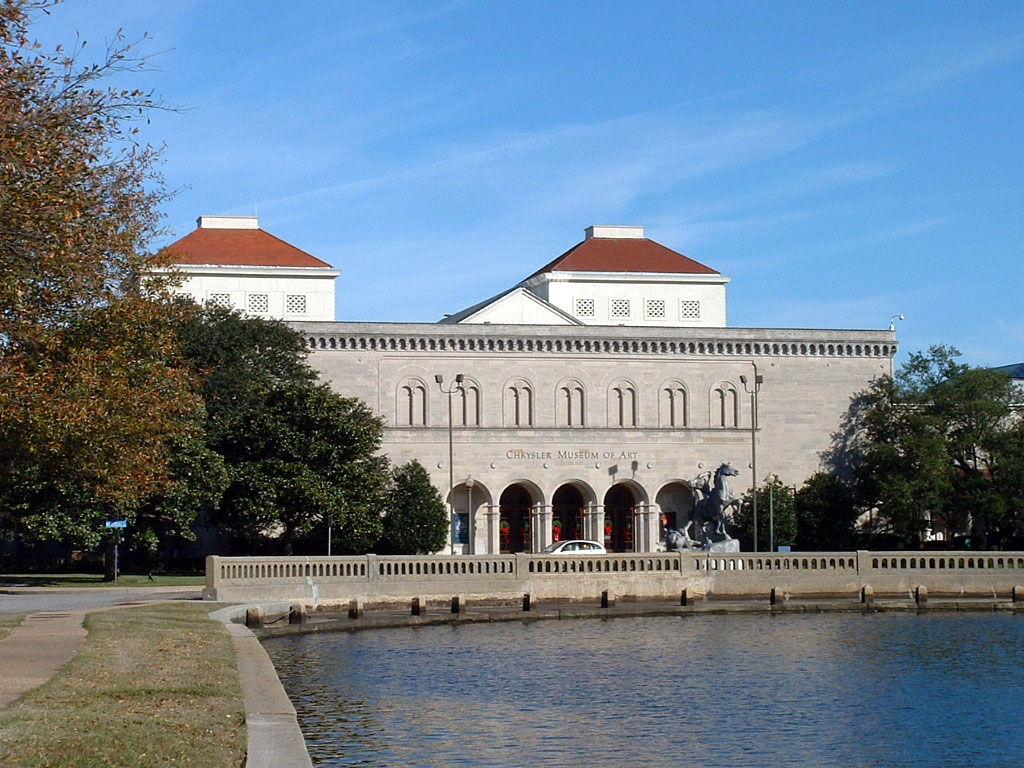
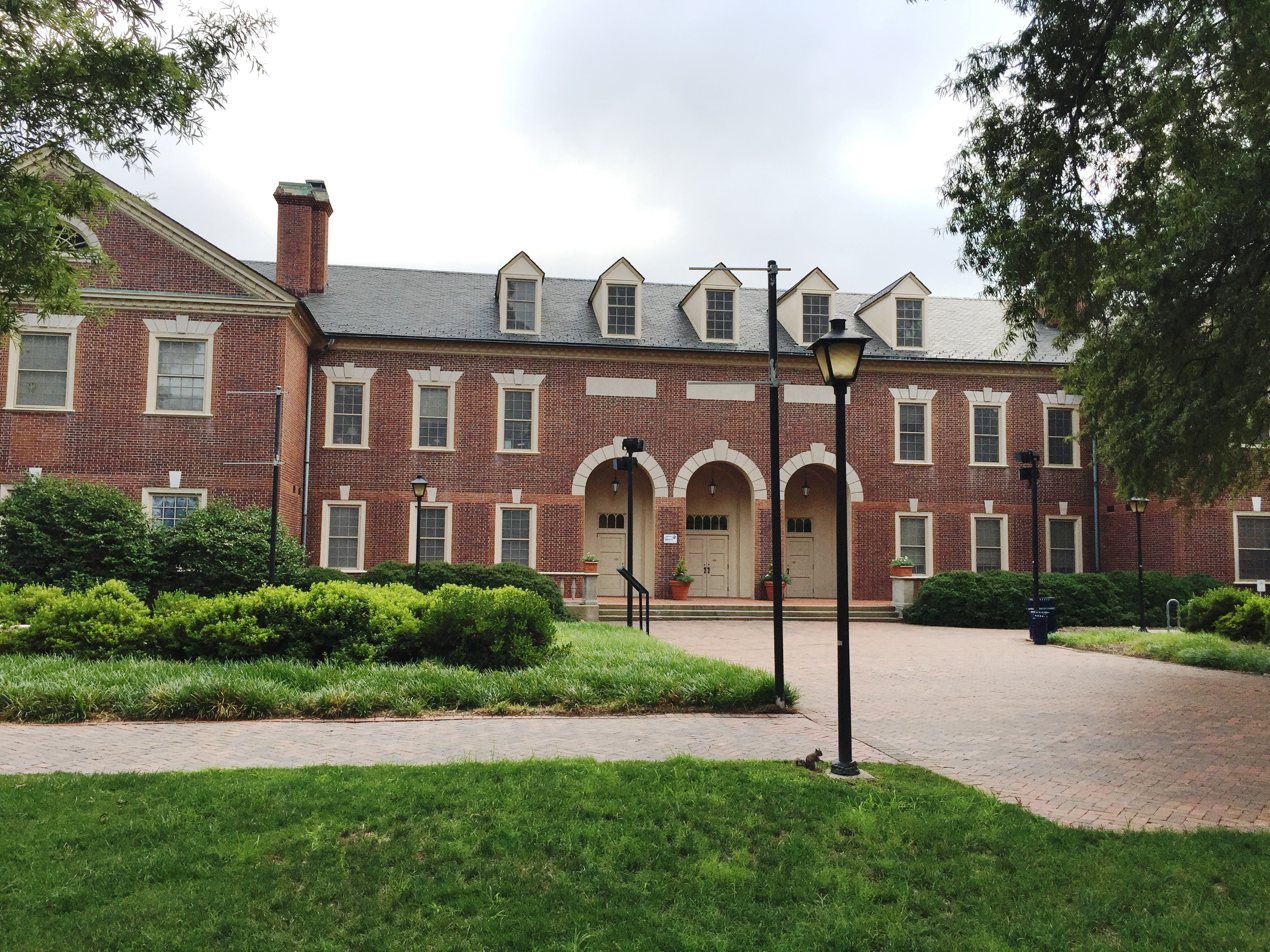
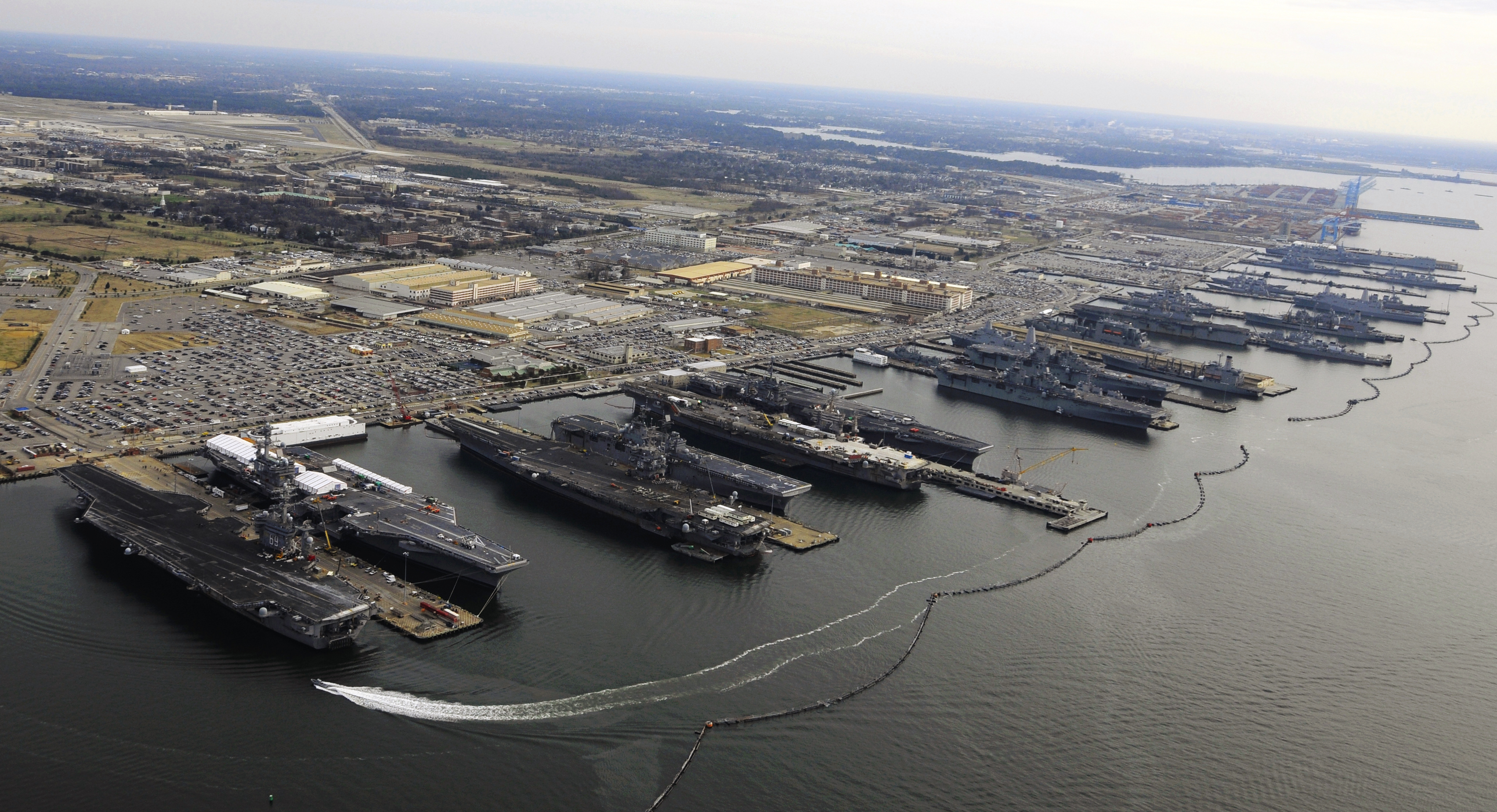
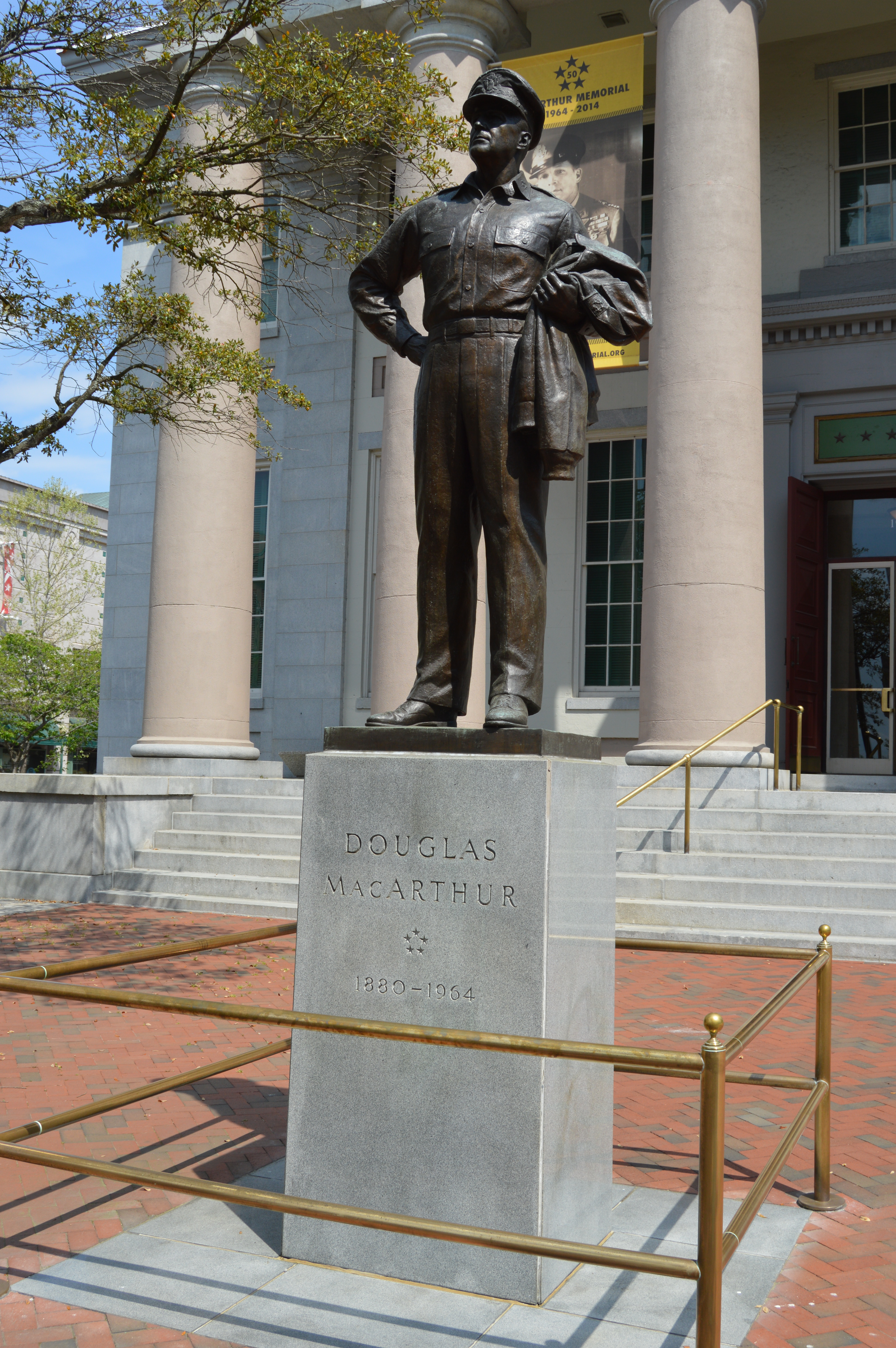
- Skyline of Downtown Norfolk USS Wisconsin Basilica of Saint Mary Chrysler Museum of Art Old Dominion University Naval Station Norfolk MacArthur Memorial

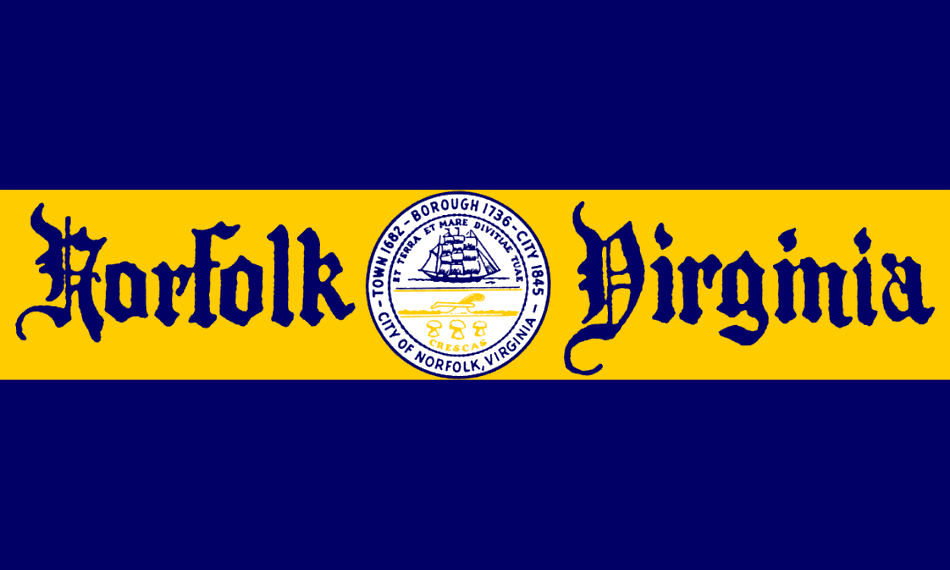
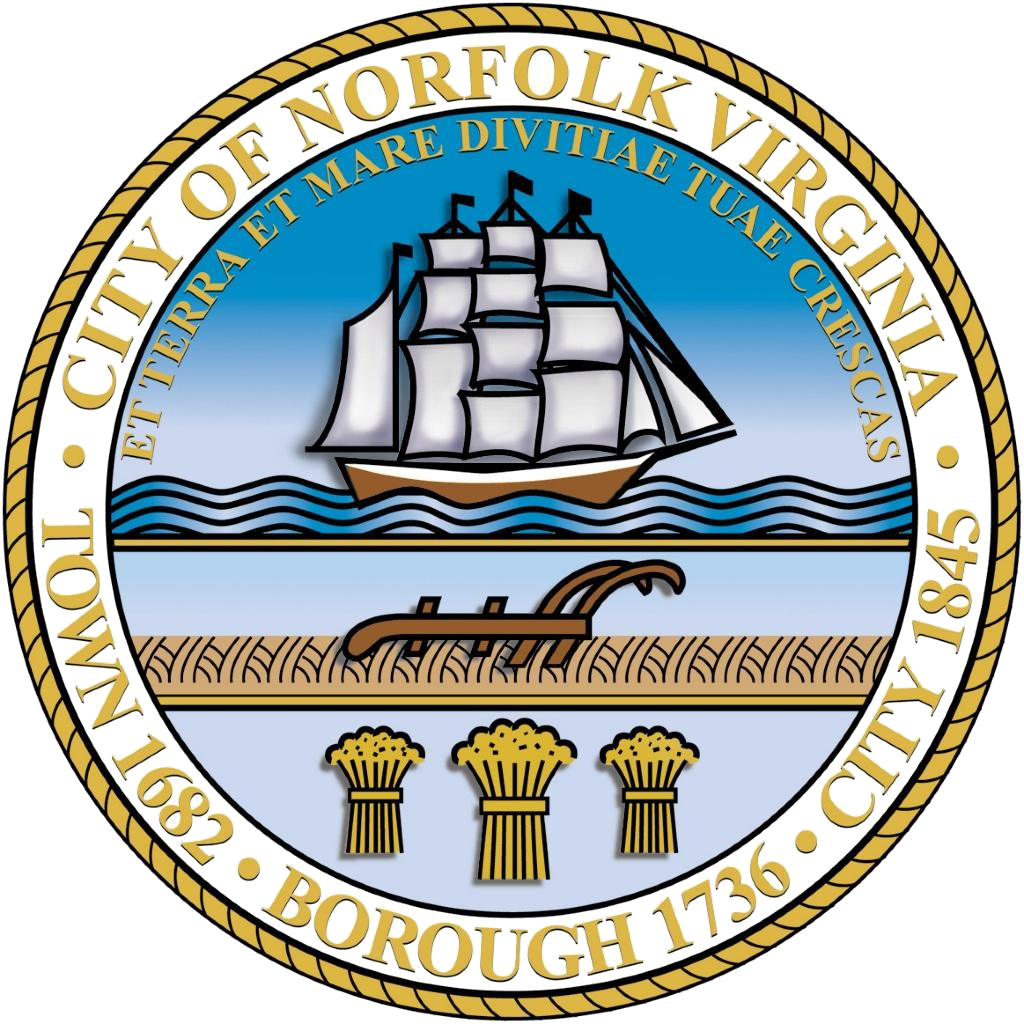
- Flag Seal
- Motto: Et terra et mare divitiae tuae, Crescas (Latin for, "By riches on land and on sea, thou shalt grow.")
- Interactive map of Norfolk
- Location within the state of Virginia Location within the United States Location within North America
- Coordinates: 36°50′49″N 76°17′07″W
- Country: United States
- State: Virginia
- County: None (independent city)
- Founded: 1680 (as town)
- Incorporated: 1736 (as borough)
- Incorporated: 1845 (as city)

Government
  - Mayor: Kenny Alexander (D)

Area
  - Independent city: 96.41 sq mi (249.70 km^{2})
  - Land: 53.28 sq mi (137.99 km^{2})
  - Water: 43.13 sq mi (111.70 km^{2})
- Elevation: 6.9 ft (2.1 m)

Population (2020)
  - Independent city: 238,005
  - Estimate (2025): 231,013 ▼
  - Rank: 101st in the United States; 4th in Virginia
  - Density: 4,470/sq mi (1,725/km^{2})
  - Urban: 1,047,869
  - Metro: 1,725,246 (37th)
- Time zone: UTC−5 (EST)
  - Summer (DST): UTC−4 (EDT)
- ZIP Codes: 23501–23515, 23517–23521, 23523, 23529, 23541, 23551
- Area codes: 757, 948
- FIPS code: 51-57000
- GNIS feature ID: 1497051
- Primary Airport: Norfolk International Airport
- Light Rail: The Tide
- Public transportation: Hampton Roads Transit
- Website: www.norfolk.gov

Norfolk (locally /ˈnɔːrfək/ NOR-fək) is an independent city in the U.S. commonwealth of Virginia. It had a population of 238,005 at the 2020 census, making it the third-most populous city in both the Hampton Roads metropolitan area and in Virginia, after neighboring cities Virginia Beach and Chesapeake, as well as the 101st-most populous city in the United States. The city holds a strategic position as the historical, urban, financial, and cultural center of the Hampton Roads area (sometimes called "Tidewater"), which has more than 1.8 million inhabitants and is the 37th-largest metropolitan area in the U.S.

Norfolk was established in 1682 as a colonial seaport. Strategically located at the confluence of the Elizabeth River and the Chesapeake Bay, it quickly developed into a major center for trade and shipbuilding. During the American Revolution and War of 1812, its port and naval facilities made it a critical military target. Norfolk's prominence grew in the 20th century with the expansion of the U.S. Navy, particularly through the establishment of Naval Station Norfolk in 1917, which remains the world's largest naval base.

Norfolk is an important contributor to the Port of Virginia and houses one of NATO's two Strategic Command headquarters. It is home to Maersk Line, Limited, which manages the world's largest fleet of US-flag vessels. The city has numerous cultural institutions including the Nauticus maritime museum, Chrysler Museum of Art, and Virginia Zoo. Norfolk has many miles of riverfront and bayfront areas, including beaches on the Chesapeake Bay.

== History ==
=== 17th century ===
When the South Hampton Roads portion of the shire was separated, Thoroughgood suggested the name of his birthplace for the newly formed New Norfolk County. One year later, it was divided into two counties, Upper Norfolk and Lower Norfolk (the latter now incorporated into the City of Norfolk), chiefly on Thoroughgood's recommendation. This area of Virginia became known as the place of entrepreneurs, including men of the Virginia Company of London.

Norfolk developed in the late-seventeenth century as a "Half Moone" fort was constructed and 50 acres (200,000 m^{2}) were acquired from local natives of the Powhatan Confederacy in exchange for 10,000 pounds of tobacco. The House of Burgesses established the "Towne of Lower Norfolk County" in 1680.

=== 18th century ===
Norfolk was incorporated in 1705. In 1730, a tobacco inspection site was located here. According to the Tobacco Inspection Act, the inspection was "At Norfolk Town, upon the fort land, in the County of Norfolk; and Kemp's Landing, in Princess Anne, under one inspection." In 1736 George II granted it a royal charter as a borough. It was an important port for exporting goods to the British Isles and beyond.

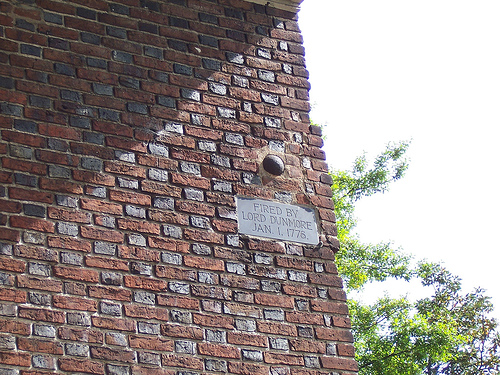
A cannonball lodged in the wall of St. Paul's Episcopal Church, fired by Lord Dunmore's fleet during the Revolutionary War

After the American Revolution forced the Royal Governor of Virginia, John Murray, 4th Earl of Dunmore, to flee from Williamsburg, he made Norfolk the new capital of Virginia in 1775. Norfolk's 6,250 residents were primarily Loyalist because the British government had granted trade monopolies to many of their businesses. After losing at the Battle of Great Bridge that December, Lord Dunmore partially destroyed the city with naval cannonading. On January 16, 1776, the Patriots' Fourth Virginia Convention agreed to destroy most remaining homes to prevent Dunmore from using the city to amass British troops and runaway slaves.

Ultimately, Colonel Woodford drove Dunmore into exile. Only the walls of Saint Paul's Episcopal Church survived the bombardment and subsequent fires. A cannonball from the bombardment (fired by the Liverpool) remains within the wall of Saint Paul's.

=== Nineteenth century ===
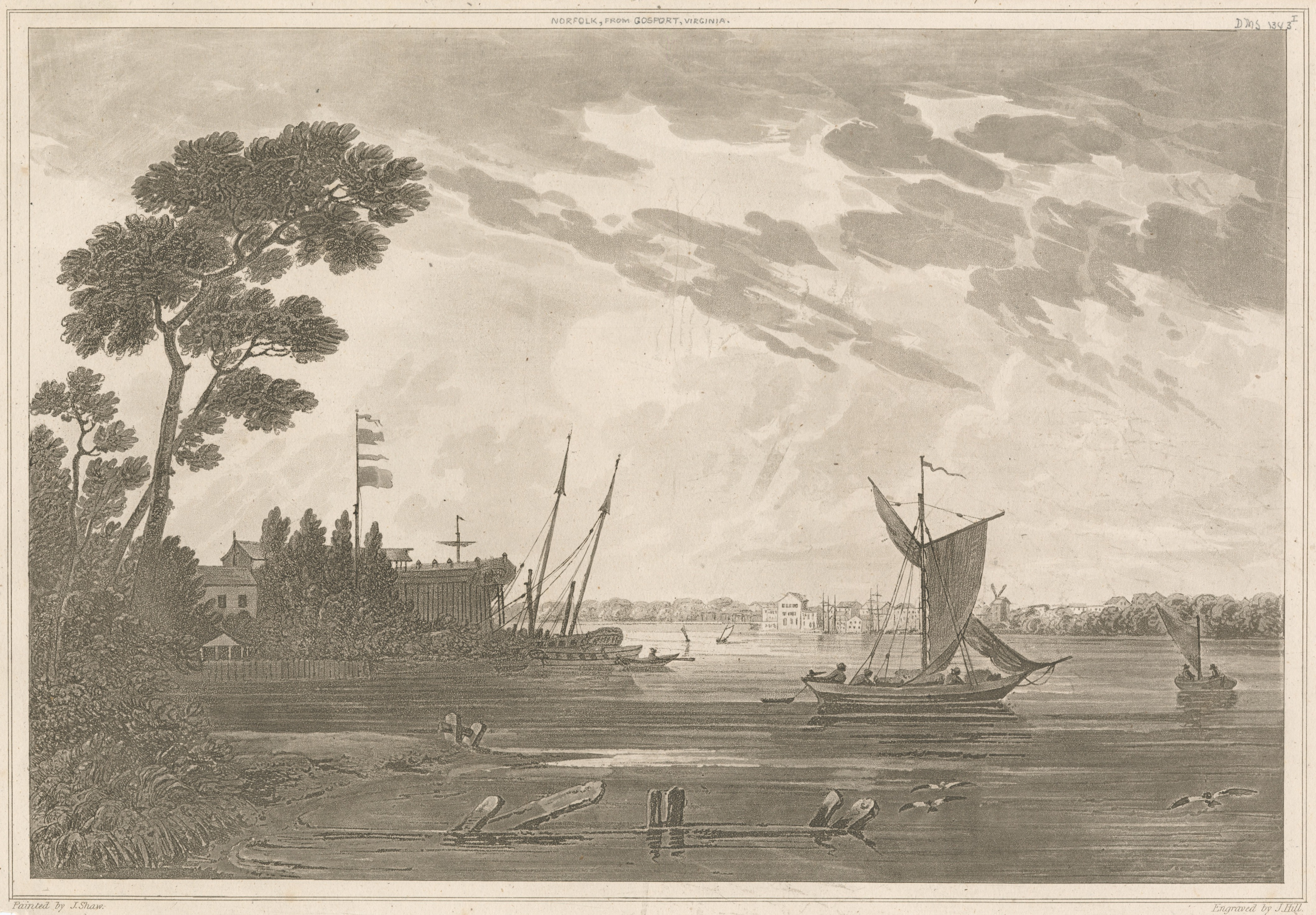
Norfolk, from Gosport, Virginia, New York Public Library

When the British occupied Norfolk, Thomas Jefferson ordered its destruction by fire. Following recovery from the Revolutionary War's burning, Norfolk and its citizens struggled to rebuild. In 1804, another serious fire along the city's waterfront destroyed some 300 buildings and the city suffered a serious economic setback. During the War of 1812, British forces launched an unsuccessful raid against Norfolk.

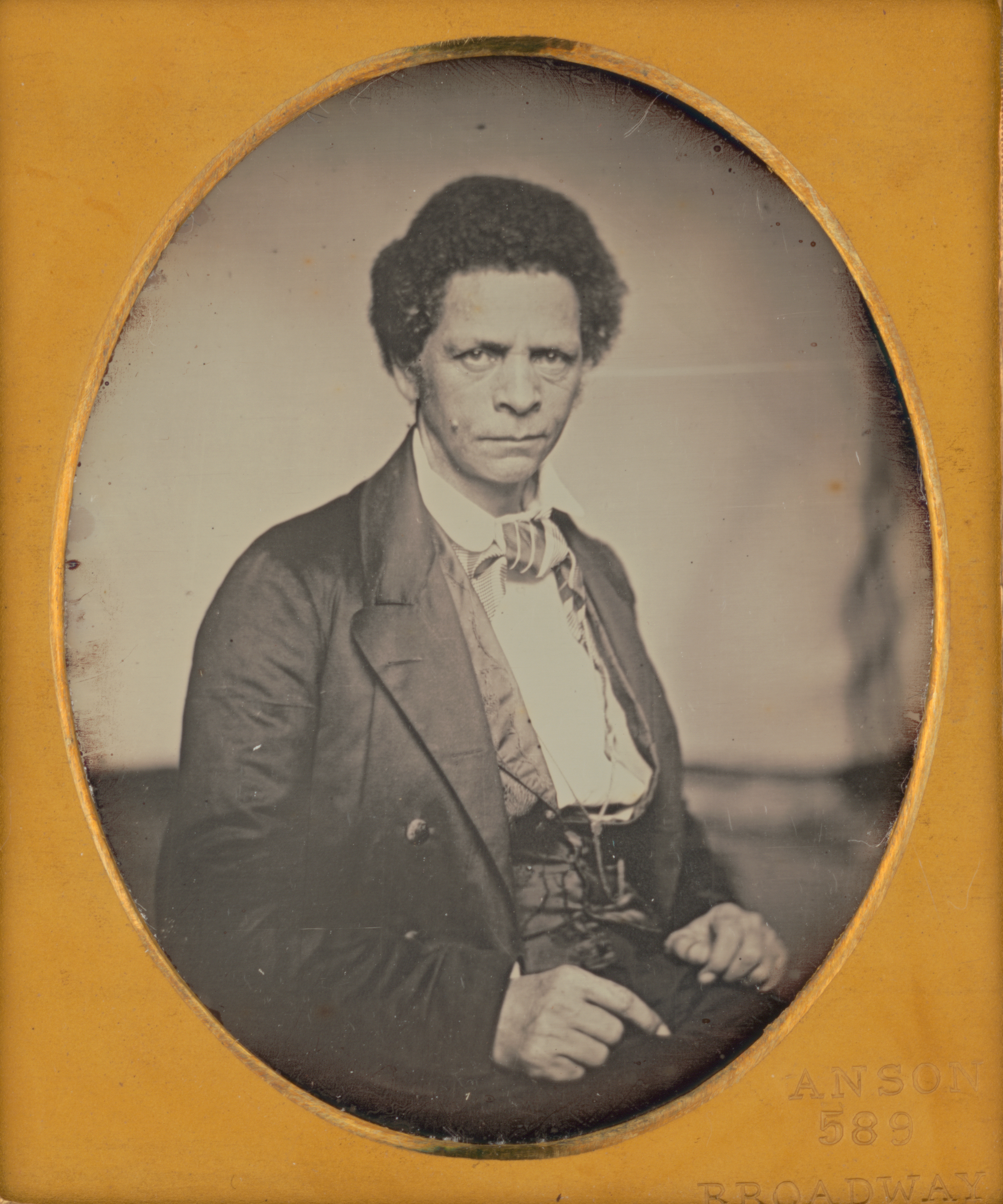
Joseph Jenkins Roberts, born and raised in Norfolk, became the first president of Liberia

The American Colonization Society proposed to "repatriate" free blacks and freed slaves to Africa by establishing the new colony of Liberia and paying for transportation. But most African Americans wanted to stay in their birthplace of the United States and achieve freedom and rights there. For a period, many emigrants to Liberia from Virginia and North Carolina embarked from the port of Norfolk. Joseph Jenkins Roberts, a free person of color native to Norfolk, emigrated via the American Colonization Society and later was elected as the first president of Liberia, establishing a powerful family.

In 1845, Norfolk was incorporated as a city. On June 7, 1855, the 183-foot vessel Benjamin Franklin put into Hampton Roads for repairs. The ship had just sailed from the West Indies, where there had been an outbreak of yellow fever. The port health officer ordered the ship quarantined. After eleven days, a second inspection found no issues, so it was allowed to dock. A few days later, the first cases of yellow fever were discovered in Norfolk, and a machinist died from the disease on July 8. By August, several people were dying per day, and a third of the city's population had fled in the hopes of escaping the epidemic. No one understood how the disease was transmitted. With both Norfolk and Portsmouth being infected, New York banned all traffic from those sites. Neighboring cities also banned residents from Norfolk. The epidemic spread through the city via mosquitoes and poor sanitation, affecting every family and causing widespread panic. The number of infected reached 5,000 in September, and by the second week, 1,500 had died in Norfolk and Portsmouth. As the weather cooled, the outbreak began to wane, leaving a final tally of about 3,200 dead. It took the city some time to recover.

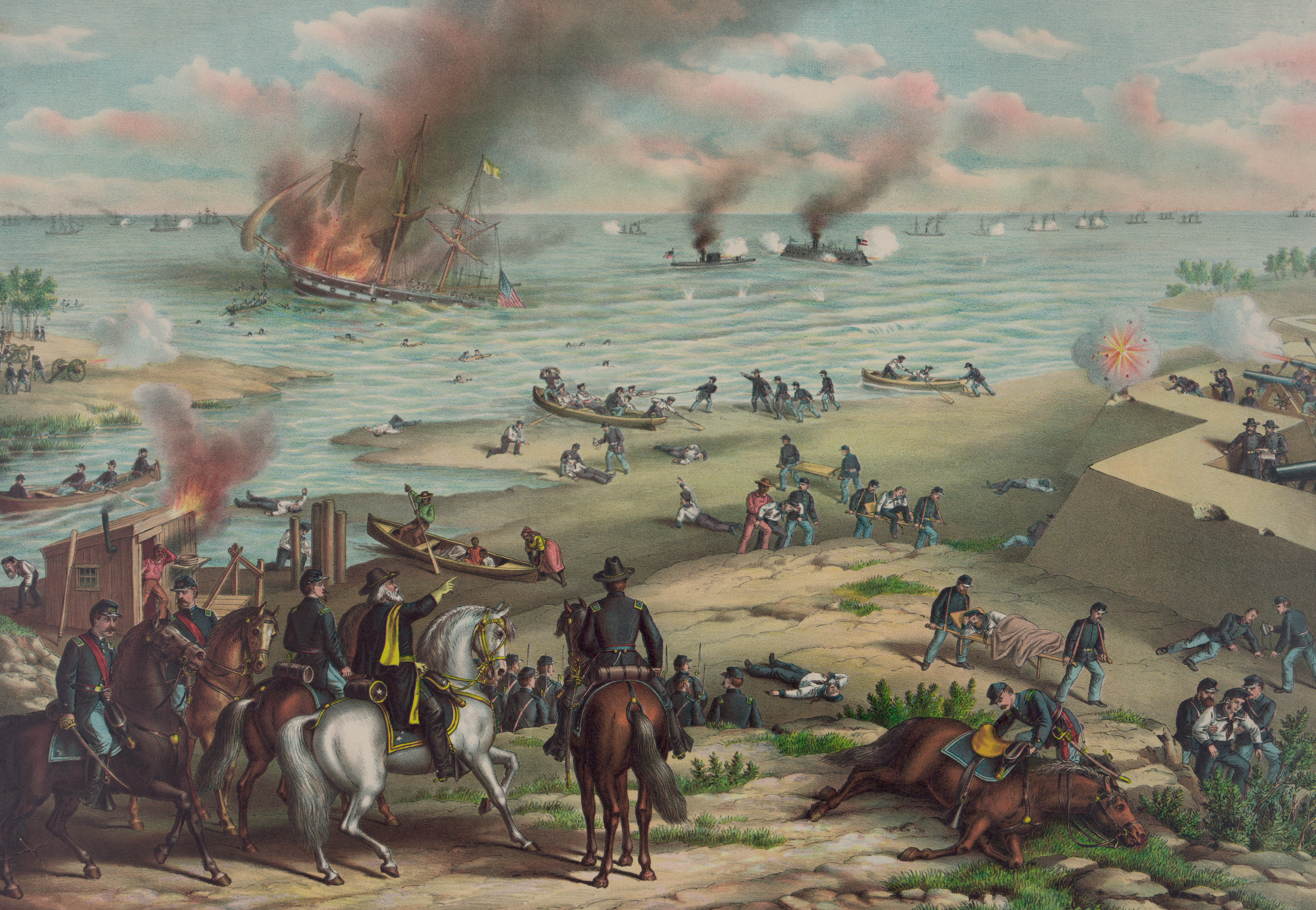
Battle of Hampton Roads between the USS Monitor and the CSS Virginia

On April 4, 1861, Norfolk city delegate to the Virginia Secession Convention, George Blow, voted against secession. Following the Battle of Fort Sumter, another vote occurred on April 17, where Blow voted for secession, the vote passed and Virginia seceded from the Union. In the spring of 1862, the Battle of Hampton Roads took place off the northwest shore of the city's Sewell's Point Peninsula, marking the first fight between two ironclads, the USS Monitor and the CSS Virginia. The battle ended in a stalemate but changed the course of naval warfare; from then on, warships were fortified with metal.

In May 1862, Norfolk Mayor William Lamb surrendered the city to Union General John E. Wool and his forces. They held the city under martial law for the duration of the Civil War. Thousands of slaves from the region escaped to Union lines to gain freedom; they quickly set up schools in Norfolk to start learning how to read and write, years before the end of the war.

=== 20th century ===
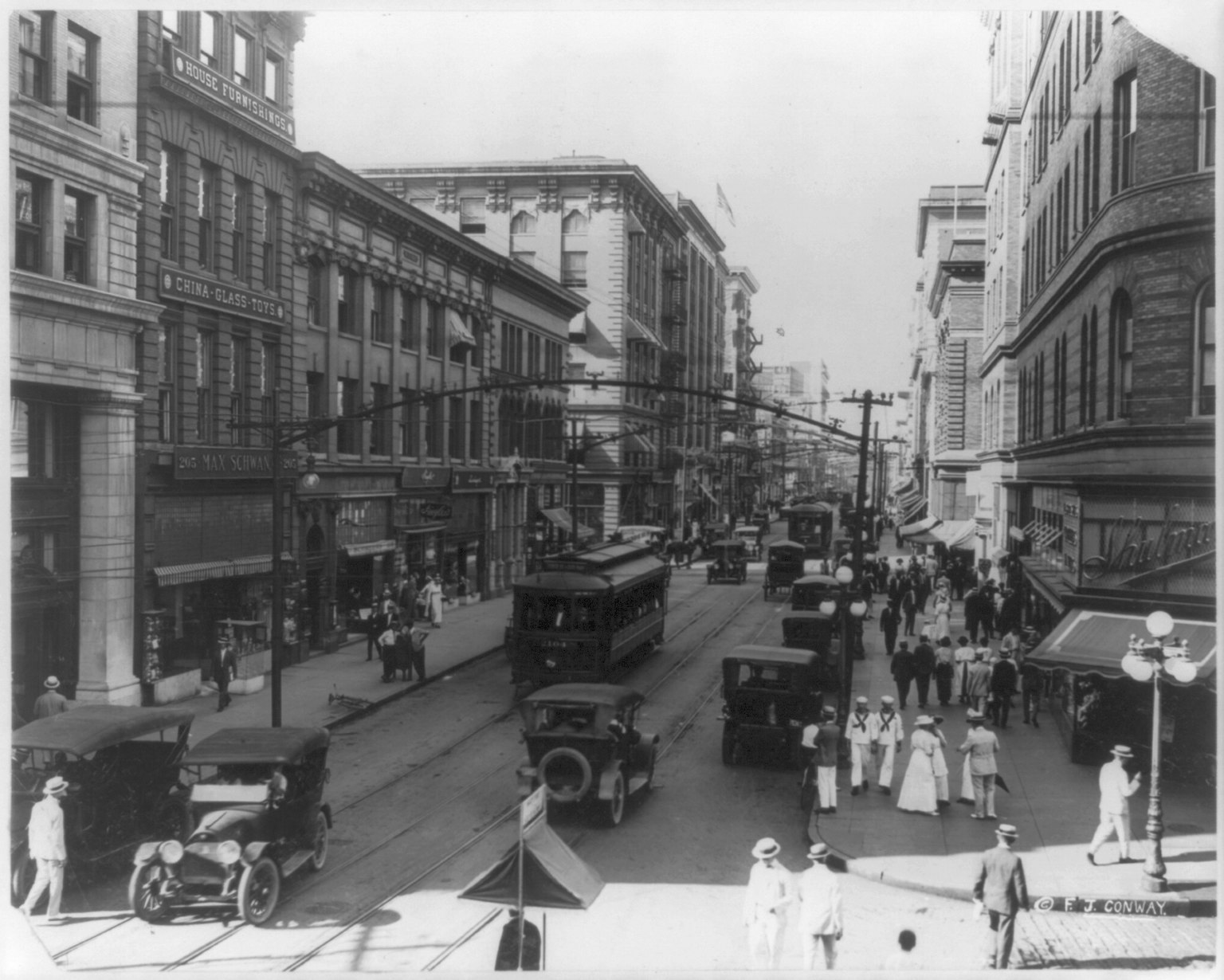
Granby Street from corner of City Hall Avenue, 1915

1907 brought both the Virginian Railway and the Jamestown Exposition to Sewell's Point. The large Naval Review at the Exposition demonstrated the peninsula's favorable location and laid the groundwork for the world's largest naval base. Southern Democrats in Congress gained its location here. Commemorating the tricentennial anniversary of the founding of Jamestown, the exposition featured many prominent officials, including President Theodore Roosevelt, members of Congress, and diplomats from twenty-one countries. By 1917, as the US prepared to enter World War I, the Naval Air Station Hampton Roads had been constructed on the former exposition grounds. This facility was established as an air training station and a patrol base to conduct experimental work in seaplane operations at the Naval Operation Base.

In the first half of the twentieth century, the city of Norfolk expanded its borders through annexation. In 1906, the city annexed the incorporated town of Berkley, making the city cross the Elizabeth River. In 1923, the city expanded to include Sewell's Point, Willoughby Spit, the town of Campostella, and the Ocean View area. The city included the Navy Base and miles of beach property fronting on Hampton Roads and the Chesapeake Bay. After additional annexations in 1955 and 1959, and a 1988 land swap with Virginia Beach, the city assumed its current boundaries.

The establishment of the Interstate Highway System following World War II brought new highways to the region. A series of bridges and tunnels, constructed during fifteen years, linked Norfolk with the Peninsula, Portsmouth, and Virginia Beach. In 1952, the Downtown Tunnel opened to connect Norfolk with the city of Portsmouth. The highways also stimulated the development of new housing suburbs, leading to the population spreading out. Additional bridges and tunnels included the Hampton Roads Bridge-Tunnel in 1957, the Midtown Tunnel in 1962, and the Virginia Beach-Norfolk Expressway (Interstate 264 and State Route 44) in 1967. In 1991, the new Downtown Tunnel/Berkley Bridge complex opened a new system of multiple lanes of highway and interchanges connecting Downtown Norfolk and Interstate 464 with the Downtown Tunnel tubes.

In 1954, the Supreme Court ruled in Brown v. Board of Education that segregated public schools were unconstitutional, as the public system was supported by all taxpayers. It ordered integration, but Virginia pursued a policy of "massive resistance". (At this time, most black citizens were still disfranchised under the state's turn-of-the-century constitution and discriminatory practices related to voter registration and elections.) The Virginia General Assembly prohibited state funding for integrated public schools.

In 1958, United States district courts in Virginia ordered schools to open for the first time on a racially integrated basis. In response, Governor J. Lindsay Almond ordered the schools closed. The Virginia Supreme Court of Appeals declared the state law to be in conflict with the state constitution and ordered all public schools to be funded, whether integrated or not. About ten days later, Almond capitulated and asked the General Assembly to rescind several "massive resistance" laws. In February 1959, seventeen black children entered six previously segregated Norfolk public schools. Virginian-Pilot editor Lenoir Chambers editorialized against massive resistance and earned the Pulitzer Prize for Editorial Writing.

With new suburban developments beckoning, many white middle-class residents moved out of the city along new highway routes, and Norfolk's population declined. In the late-1960s and early-1970s, the advent of newer suburban shopping destinations along with freeways spelled demise for the fortunes of downtown's Granby Street commercial corridor, located just a few blocks inland from the waterfront. The opening of malls and large shopping centers drew off retail business from Granby Street.

People for the Ethical Treatment of Animals (PETA) has been based in Norfolk since 1996.

Norfolk's city leaders began a long push to revive its urban core. While Granby Street underwent decline, Norfolk city leaders focused on the waterfront and its collection of decaying piers and warehouses. Many obsolete shipping and warehousing facilities were demolished. In their place, planners created a new boulevard, Waterside Drive, along which many of the high-rise buildings in Norfolk's skyline have been erected. In 1983, the city, The Rouse Company and the Enterprise Development Company developed the Waterside festival marketplace to attract people back to the waterfront and catalyze further downtown redevelopment. Other facilities opened in the ensuing years, including the Harbor Park baseball stadium, home of the Norfolk Tides Triple-A minor league baseball team. In 1995, the park was named the finest facility in minor league baseball by Baseball America. Downtown's rising fortunes helped to expand the city's revenues and allowed the city to direct attention to other neighborhoods.

=== 21st century ===
In 2003, the Allied Command Transformation, a military command of NATO, was founded and headquartered in Norfolk.

Changes to Downtown continued. In December 2000, the USS Wisconsin (BB-64) became a museum ship for Nauticus, adding a new amenity to the waterside. In August 2011, Virginia's first light rail train, The Tide, began service in Norfolk, stopping at EVMS and Downtown Norfolk before continuing along I-264 to Newtown Road. In 1999, MacArthur Center opened, only to be bought by the City of Norfolk in 2023 and closed in 2026. As of 2026, the City is planning a redevelopment of the center as part of its Downtown Norfolk 2030 Plan.

In 2018, railroad company Norfolk Southern announced that it was moving its headquarters out of Norfolk to Atlanta, taking with it hundreds of well-paying jobs.

In November 2020, Norfolk voters approved a casino referendum. In 2024, a temporary casino facility was opened as a partnership between Las Vegas-based Boyd Gaming and the Pamunkey Indian Tribe. As of February 2026, the full 12-story resort casino is scheduled to open in late 2027.

Flooding and sea-level rise have become major concerns for the city. In 2003, Hurricane Isabel caused high tides and a storm surge, flooding the Midtown Tunnel between Norfolk and Portsmouth. In general, tidal flooding in Norfolk increased from about 5 days in 2000 to 10-15 days in 2020. The US Army Corps of Engineers completed a study of coastal flooding in Norfolk in 2019, beginning the Coastal Storm Risk Management (CSRM) Project. As of March 2026, the CSRM is estimated to cost $6.1 billion and is scheduled for completion in 2037.

== Geography ==
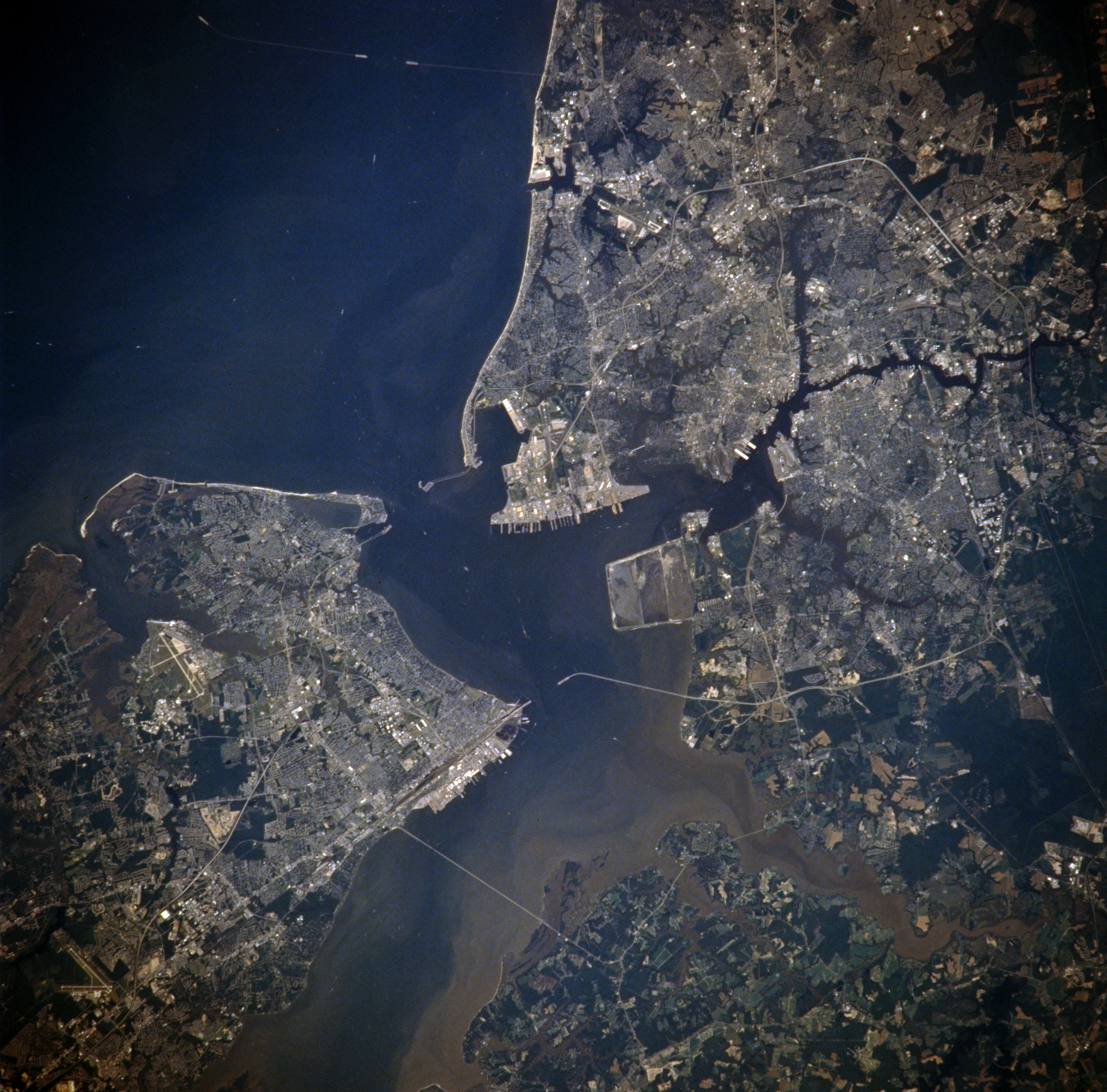
Newport News, Hampton, Isle of Wight County, Suffolk, Chesapeake, Portsmouth and Norfolk, from space, July 1996. Norfolk is located in the upper-right quadrant; east is at the top.

The city is located at the southeastern corner of Virginia at the junction of the Elizabeth River and the Chesapeake Bay. The Hampton Roads Metropolitan Statistical Area (officially known as the Virginia Beach-Norfolk-Newport News, VA-NC MSA) is the 37th largest in the United States, with an estimated population of 1,716,624 in 2014. The area includes the Virginia cities of Norfolk, Virginia Beach, Chesapeake, Hampton, Newport News, Poquoson, Portsmouth, Suffolk, Williamsburg, and the counties of Gloucester, Isle of Wight, James City, Mathews, and York, as well as the North Carolina counties of Currituck and Gates. The city of Norfolk is recognized as the central business district, while the Virginia Beach oceanside resort district and Williamsburg are primarily centers of tourism. Virginia Beach is the most populated city within the MSA though it functions more as a suburb. Additionally, Norfolk is part of the Virginia Beach-Norfolk, VA-NC Combined Statistical Area, which includes the Virginia Beach-Norfolk-Newport News, VA-NC MSA, the Elizabeth City, North Carolina Micropolitan Statistical Area, and the Kill Devil Hills, NC Micropolitan Statistical Area.

=== Sea level rise and subsidence ===
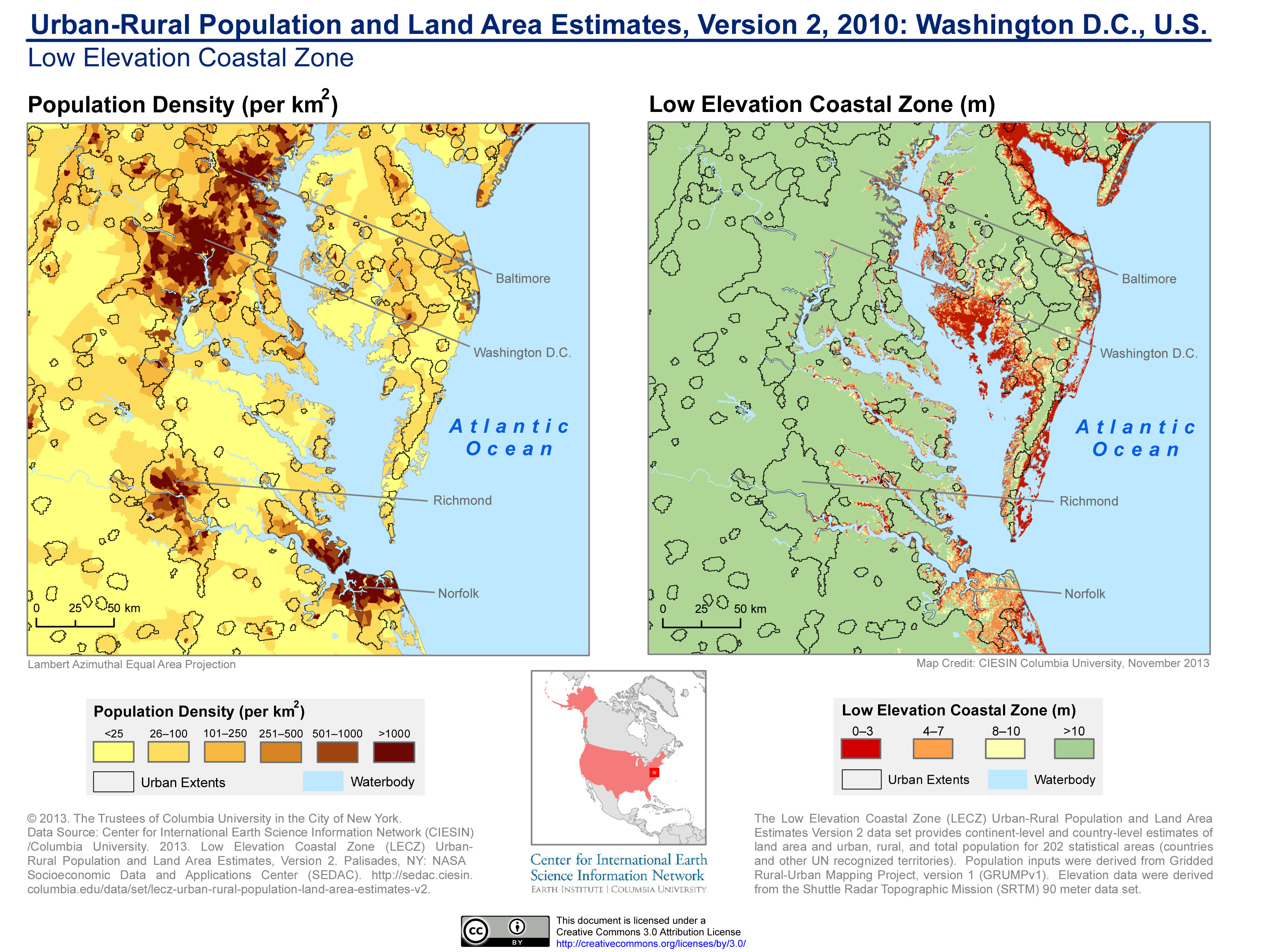
Population density and elevation above sea level around the Chesapeake Bay. Norfolk is especially vulnerable to sea level rise.

Being low-lying and largely surrounded by water, Norfolk is particularly vulnerable to rising sea levels caused by climate change. In addition, the land on which it is built is slowly subsiding. Some areas already flood regularly at high tide, and the city commissioned a study in 2012 to investigate how to address the issue in the future: it reported the cost of dealing with a sea-level rise of one foot would be around $1,000,000,000. Since then, scientists at the Virginia Institute of Marine Science in 2013 have estimated that if current trends hold, the sea in Norfolk will rise by 5 and 1/2 feet or more by the end of this century.

=== Neighborhoods ===
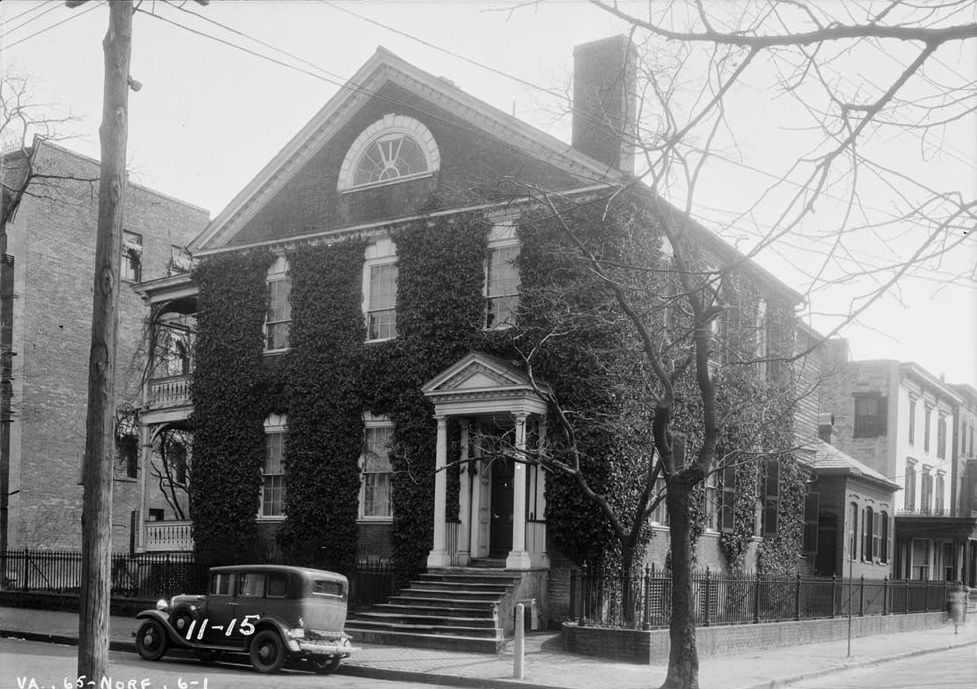
Taylor-Whittle House (c. 1790), now occupied by the Junior League of Norfolk-Virginia Beach and the Norfolk Historical Society

Norfolk has a variety of historic neighborhoods, notably Freemason and West Freemason. Some neighborhoods, such as Berkley, were formerly cities and towns. Others, including Willoughby Spit and Ocean View, have a long history tied to the Chesapeake Bay. The city's revitalization in recent decades has transformed neighborhoods such as Downtown, Ghent and Fairmount Park. Popular residential neighborhoods include Ghent, Colonial Place, Larchmont, North Shore, Edgewater, and Lafayette Shores.

=== Climate ===
Narrative below is based on climate data from the 1991–2020 period. Norfolk has a humid subtropical climate, typical of the Southern United States, and its USDA Hardiness Zone is 8a.

Spring arrives in March with mild days and cool nights, and by late May, the temperature has warmed up considerably to herald warm summer days.

Summers are consistently warm and humid, but the nearby Atlantic Ocean often exercises a slight cooling effect on daytime high temperatures and a slight warming effect on nighttime low temperatures (compared to areas farther inland). As such, temperatures reach 90 °F (32 °C) or higher on an average 35 days annually, and 100 °F (37.8 °C) are uncommon, occurring in fewer than one-third of all years. On average, July is the warmest month, with a normal mean temperature of 81.1 °F (27.3 °C).

On average, July and August are the wettest months, due to frequent summer thunderstorm activity. In August and September, rainfall remains high, due to rising frequency of tropical activity, which can bring high winds and heavy rains. These usually brush Norfolk and only occasionally make landfalls in the area; the highest-risk period is mid-August to the end of September.

Fall is marked by mild to warm days and cooler nights.

Winter is usually mild in Norfolk, with average winter days featuring lows near or slightly above freezing and highs in the upper-40s to mid-50s (8 to 13 °C). On average, the coldest month of the year is January, with a normal mean temperature of 42.2 °F (5.7 °C), Snow occurs sporadically, with an average winter accumulation of 6.2 in (15.7 cm).

Norfolk's record high was 105 °F (41 °C) on August 7, 1918, and July 24 and 25, 2010, and the record low was −3 °F (−19 °C) recorded on January 21, 1985.

Climate data for Norfolk International Airport, Virginia (1991–2020 normals, (Note: Mean monthly maxima and minima (i.e. the expected highest and lowest temperature readings at any point during the year or given month) calculated based on data at said location from 1991 to 2020.) extremes 1874–present (Note: Official records for Norfolk kept January 1874 to December 1945 at the Weather Bureau Office in downtown, and at Norfolk Int'l since January 1946. For more information, see Threadex.))
Month	Jan	Feb	Mar	Apr	May	Jun	Jul	Aug	Sep	Oct	Nov	Dec	Year
Record high °F (°C)	84 (29)	82 (28)	92 (33)	97 (36)	100 (38)	102 (39)	105 (41)	105 (41)	100 (38)	95 (35)	86 (30)	82 (28)	105 (41)
Mean maximum °F (°C)	72.4 (22.4)	74.3 (23.5)	80.7 (27.1)	86.9 (30.5)	91.5 (33.1)	95.7 (35.4)	98.4 (36.9)	95.3 (35.2)	92.0 (33.3)	86.0 (30.0)	78.9 (26.1)	73.4 (23.0)	99.3 (37.4)
Mean daily maximum °F (°C)	50.7 (10.4)	53.4 (11.9)	60.1 (15.6)	70.0 (21.1)	77.4 (25.2)	85.2 (29.6)	89.4 (31.9)	86.9 (30.5)	81.4 (27.4)	72.3 (22.4)	62.1 (16.7)	54.7 (12.6)	70.3 (21.3)
Daily mean °F (°C)	42.2 (5.7)	44.2 (6.8)	50.7 (10.4)	60.1 (15.6)	68.3 (20.2)	76.7 (24.8)	81.1 (27.3)	79.2 (26.2)	74.0 (23.3)	63.7 (17.6)	53.3 (11.8)	46.1 (7.8)	61.6 (16.4)
Mean daily minimum °F (°C)	33.6 (0.9)	35.1 (1.7)	41.3 (5.2)	50.1 (10.1)	59.1 (15.1)	68.1 (20.1)	72.8 (22.7)	71.6 (22.0)	66.6 (19.2)	55.1 (12.8)	44.4 (6.9)	37.6 (3.1)	52.9 (11.6)
Mean minimum °F (°C)	18.7 (−7.4)	21.6 (−5.8)	27.4 (−2.6)	37.0 (2.8)	46.9 (8.3)	56.0 (13.3)	64.7 (18.2)	63.7 (17.6)	55.5 (13.1)	40.4 (4.7)	29.8 (−1.2)	23.9 (−4.5)	16.8 (−8.4)
Record low °F (°C)	−3 (−19)	2 (−17)	14 (−10)	23 (−5)	36 (2)	45 (7)	54 (12)	49 (9)	40 (4)	27 (−3)	17 (−8)	5 (−15)	−3 (−19)
Average precipitation inches (mm)	3.41 (87)	2.90 (74)	3.69 (94)	3.37 (86)	3.78 (96)	4.43 (113)	6.08 (154)	5.88 (149)	5.40 (137)	3.86 (98)	3.10 (79)	3.28 (83)	49.18 (1,249)
Average snowfall inches (cm)	3.2 (8.1)	1.5 (3.8)	0.4 (1.0)	0.0 (0.0)	0.0 (0.0)	0.0 (0.0)	0.0 (0.0)	0.0 (0.0)	0.0 (0.0)	0.0 (0.0)	0.0 (0.0)	1.1 (2.8)	6.2 (16)
Average precipitation days (≥ 0.01 in)	10.7	9.2	10.9	10.0	11.2	9.7	10.6	10.2	9.4	7.7	8.9	9.9	118.4
Average snowy days (≥ 0.1 in)	1.7	1.3	0.5	0.0	0.0	0.0	0.0	0.0	0.0	0.0	0.0	0.5	4.0
Average relative humidity (%)	66.3	65.6	64.6	62.8	68.8	70.6	73.3	75.2	74.4	72.1	68.5	67.0	69.1
Average dew point °F (°C)	27.9 (−2.3)	28.9 (−1.7)	35.8 (2.1)	43.2 (6.2)	54.5 (12.5)	63.1 (17.3)	68.2 (20.1)	68.0 (20.0)	62.4 (16.9)	51.3 (10.7)	41.7 (5.4)	32.7 (0.4)	48.1 (9.0)
Mean monthly sunshine hours	171.5	175.2	229.3	252.8	271.7	280.1	278.3	260.4	231.4	208.3	175.7	160.4	2,695.1
Percentage possible sunshine	56	58	62	64	62	64	62	62	62	60	57	53	61
Average ultraviolet index	2	4	5	7	8	10	9	9	7	5	3	2	6
Source 1: NOAA (relative humidity and sun 1961–1990)
Source 2: Weather Atlas (UV)

== Demographics ==
Historical population
Census	Pop.	Note	%±
1790	2,959		—
1800	6,926		134.1%
1810	9,193		32.7%
1820	8,478		−7.8%
1830	9,814		15.8%
1840	10,929		11.4%
1850	14,326		31.1%
1860	14,620		2.1%
1870	19,229		31.5%
1880	21,966		14.2%
1890	34,871		58.7%
1900	46,624		33.7%
1910	67,452		44.7%
1920	115,777		71.6%
1930	129,710		12.0%
1940	144,335		11.3%
1950	213,513		47.9%
1960	305,872		43.3%
1970	307,951		0.7%
1980	266,979		−13.3%
1990	261,229		−2.2%
2000	234,403		−10.3%
2010	242,803		3.6%
2020	238,005		−2.0%
2025 (est.)	231,013	▼	−2.9%
U.S. Decennial Census; 1790–1960 1900–1990; 1990–2000; 2020

Norfolk reached its peak population of 307,951 at the 1970 census, when it was the most populous city in Virginia and 47th in the nation. Since then, the population has decreased at each census, with the exception of 2010. The white population in particular has declined significantly since 1970.

As of the 2020 census, the population of Norfolk was 238,005, making it the third-most populous city in Virginia and 101st nationwide. The city's population density is 4,467.5 inhabitants per square mile (1,725 per square kilometer), making it the second-densest city in Virginia with a population over 50,000 people, behind only Alexandria.

=== 2020 census ===
As of the 2020 census, Norfolk had a population of 238,005. The median age was 31.6 years. 19.1% of residents were under the age of 18 and 12.3% of residents were 65 years of age or older. For every 100 females there were 102.7 males, and for every 100 females age 18 and over there were 102.0 males age 18 and over.

There were 93,447 households in Norfolk, of which 26.6% had children under the age of 18 living in them. Of all households, 32.9% were married-couple households, 25.0% were households with a male householder and no spouse or partner present, and 34.7% were households with a female householder and no spouse or partner present. About 34.4% of all households were made up of individuals and 10.0% had someone living alone who was 65 years of age or older.

There were 101,386 housing units, of which 7.8% were vacant. The homeowner vacancy rate was 2.0% and the rental vacancy rate was 6.2%.

Norfolk city, Virginia – Racial and ethnic composition Note: the US Census treats Hispanic/Latino as an ethnic category. This table excludes Latinos from the racial categories and assigns them to a separate category. Hispanics/Latinos may be of any race.
Race / Ethnicity (NH = Non-Hispanic)	Pop 1960	Pop 1980	Pop 1990	Pop 2000	Pop 2010	Pop 2020	% 1960	% 1980	% 1990	% 2000	% 2010	% 2020
White alone (NH)	225,251	159,900	145,136	110,221	107,463	97,205	73.64%	59.89%	55.56%	47.02%	44.26%	40.84%
Black or African American alone (NH)	78,806	93,061	100,966	102,268	102,452	93,553	25.76%	34.86%	38.65%	43.63%	42.20%	39.31%
Native American or Alaska Native alone (NH)	236	885	1,070	971	935	832	0.08%	0.33%	0.41%	0.41%	0.39%	0.35%
Asian alone (NH)	1,308	7,059	6,177	6,477	7,861	8,828	0.43%	2.64%	2.36%	2.76%	3.24%	3.71%
Native Hawaiian or Pacific Islander alone (NH)	x	x	x	220	359	475	x	x	x	0.09%	0.15%	0.20%
Other race alone (NH)	271	x	269	483	471	1,331	0.09%	0.00%	0.10%	0.21%	0.19%	0.56%
Mixed race or Multiracial (NH)	x	x	x	4,848	7,118	12,651	x	x	x	2.07%	2.93%	5.32%
Hispanic or Latino (any race)	x	6,074	7,611	8,915	16,144	23,130	x	2.28%	2.91%	3.80%	6.65%	9.72%
Total	305,872	266,979	261,229	234,403	242,803	238,005	100.00%	100.00%	100.00%	100.00%	100.00%	100.00%

=== Racial and ethnic composition ===
According to 2024 estimates by the American Community Survey, the largest non-American self-reported ancestries in Norfolk were German (8.0%), English (8.0%), Irish (7.7%), Italian (3.4%), Polish (1.6%), Scottish (1.5%), and French (1.3%).

2024 estimates by the American Community Survey reports that 7.9% of Norfolk residents were foreign-born, compared to 13.5% state-wide.

Historical demographics	2020	2010	2000	1990	1980	1960
White (non-Hispanic)	40.8%	44.3%	47.0%	55.6%	59.9%	73.6%
Hispanic or Latino	9.7%	6.7%	3.8%	2.9%	2.3%	X
Black or African American (non-Hispanic)	39.3%	42.2%	43.6%	38.7%	34.9%	25.8%
Asian (non-Hispanic)	3.7%	3.2%	2.8%	2.4%	2.6%	0.4%
Pacific Islander (non-Hispanic)	0.2%	0.2%	0.1%	X	X	X
Two or more races (non-Hispanic)	5.3%	2.9%	2.1%	X	X	X

From 1960 to 2000, Norfolk's white population declined by over 115,000 individuals. During the same time period, the white population of nearby cities Virginia Beach and Chesapeake increased significantly. Factors such as economic policies, schooling, and racial fears contributed to this population shift, a phenomenon historians and journalists have called white flight.

=== Immigrant groups and languages ===
The American Community Survey estimated in 2024 that 18,511 foreign-born individuals lived in Norfolk. Of this population, the most common countries of origin were the Philippines (3,440), Honduras (1,530), Mexico (1,025), El Salvador (737), Jamaica (716), United Kingdom (573), China (460), India (460), Guatemala (450), and Germany (440).

As of 2024, 10.9% of Norfolk residents speak a language other than English, a lower rate than the state average of 18.2%. 5.6% of Norfolk residents speak Spanish.

=== Military and veteran population ===
In 2020, there were 89,604 active duty Navy and Marine Corps assigned to the Hampton Roads area, approximately 66% of which were assigned to Naval Station Norfolk.

As of 2024, 13.6% (22,316) of civilians in Norfolk were veterans, compared to 8.9% state-wide. The largest age group in this demographic was between 35 and 54-years old (30.8%), followed by 18 and 34-years old (27.0%). Almost all (89.3%) of veterans in Norfolk served in the Gulf War or later.

As of 2024, more than 4 out of 5 (82.5%) veterans in Norfolk, or 18,417 individuals, were males. Veterans accounted for 1 out of 4 (24.4%) civilian males over the age of 18 in the city.

=== Income and poverty ===
Historical population below poverty level
Year	Norfolk City	Virginia
2024	15.3%	9.8%
2023	18.3%	10.2%
2022	18.8%	10.6%
2021	16.9%	10.3%
2020	17.6%	9.2%
2015	21.5%	11.2%
2010	19.0%	11.1%
2005	18.9%	10.0%
2000	18.6%	8.9%
U.S. Small Area Income and Poverty Estimates (SAIPE)

The American Community Survey estimated in 2024 that the median income of households in Norfolk was $65,797 in inflation-adjusted dollars. The median income was $79,198 for family households and $51,215 for nonfamily households. Of all households, 9.5% had an income under $15,000, compared to the state average of 7.0%.

As of 2024, 32,115 (15.3%) individuals in Norfolk are below the poverty level, a drop from 38,185 (18.3%) individuals in 2023. The most represented age group below poverty level in Norfolk is children: 1 in 5 (20.2%) of Norfolk residents younger than 18-years old are impoverished.

Poverty levels in Norfolk also differ by race. As of 2024, the most represented races below poverty level are African Americans (20.5%) and Asians (19.9%), who are twice as likely to be below poverty level than non-Hispanic whites (9.6%) and Hispanics or Latinos (10.0%).

According to 2025 estimates by the City of Norfolk, there are 416 unhoused people in the city.

=== Education ===
Norfolk has a similar rate of high school graduates but fewer Bachelor's degree holders than the state of Virginia. According to 2024 American Community Survey estimates of the Norfolk population 25 years and over, 90.4% are high school graduates or higher, compared to the state average of 91.7%; 34.6% have a Bachelor's degree or higher, compared to the state average of 43.4%; and 14.5% have a graduate or professional degree, compared to the state average of 19.2%.

== Economy ==
According to 2024 analysis by the Bureau of Economic Analysis, Norfolk has a GDP of $26.8 million. A historical port city, Norfolk's 2024 economy was dominated by government and government enterprises ($10.0 million), transportation and utilities ($2.1 million), and trade ($1.7 million).

=== Military ===
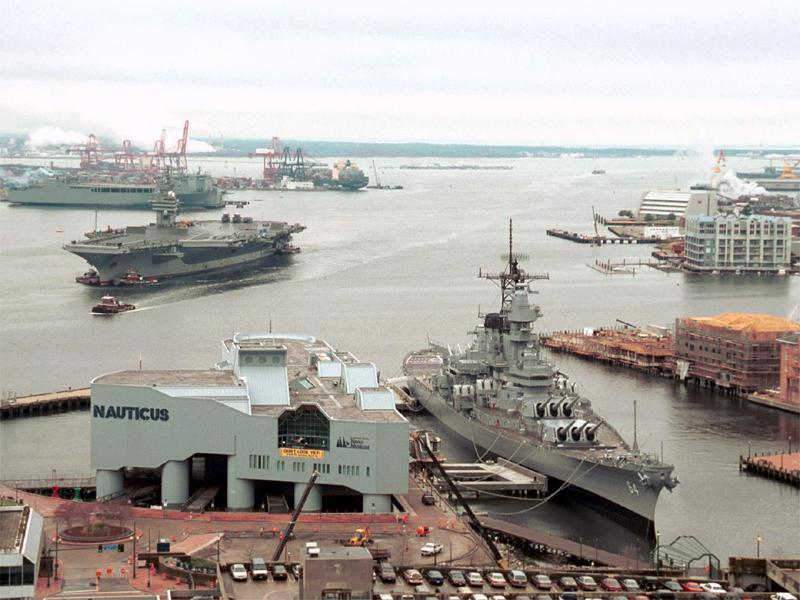
Nauticus and USS Wisconsin

In addition to commercial activities, Hampton Roads is a major military center, particularly for the United States Navy, and Norfolk serves as the home for Naval Station Norfolk, the world's largest naval installation. Located on Sewell's Point Peninsula, in the northwest corner of the city, the station is the headquarters of the United States Fleet Forces Command (formerly known as the Atlantic Fleet), which comprises over 62,000 active-duty personnel, 75 ships, and 132 aircraft. The base also serves as the headquarters to NATO's Allied Command Transformation.

The region also plays an important role in defense contracting, with particular emphasis in the shipbuilding and ship repair businesses for the city of Norfolk. Major private shipyards located in Norfolk or the Hampton Roads area include: Huntington Ingalls Industries (formerly Northrop Grumman Newport News) in Newport News, BAE Systems Norfolk Ship Repair, General Dynamics NASSCO Norfolk, and Colonna's Shipyard Inc..

=== Port and shipping ===
Headquartered in Norfolk, the Virginia Port Authority (VPA) is a Commonwealth of Virginia owned entity that, in turn, owns and operates three major port facilities in Hampton Roads for break-bulk and container type cargo. In Norfolk, Norfolk International Terminals (NIT) represents one of those three facilities and is home to the world's largest and fastest container cranes. Together, the three terminals of the VPA handled a total of over 2 million TEUs and 475,000 tons of breakbulk cargo in 2006, making it the second busiest port on the east coast of North America by total cargo volume after the Port of New York and New Jersey.

In addition to NIT, Norfolk is home to the Lambert's Point docks, the largest coal trans-shipment point in the Northern Hemisphere, with an annual capacity of approximately 48,000,000 tons. Bituminous coal is primarily sourced from the Appalachian mountains in western Virginia, West Virginia, and Kentucky. The coal is loaded onto trains and sent to the port where it is unloaded onto large breakbulk cargo ships and destined for New England, Europe, and Asia.

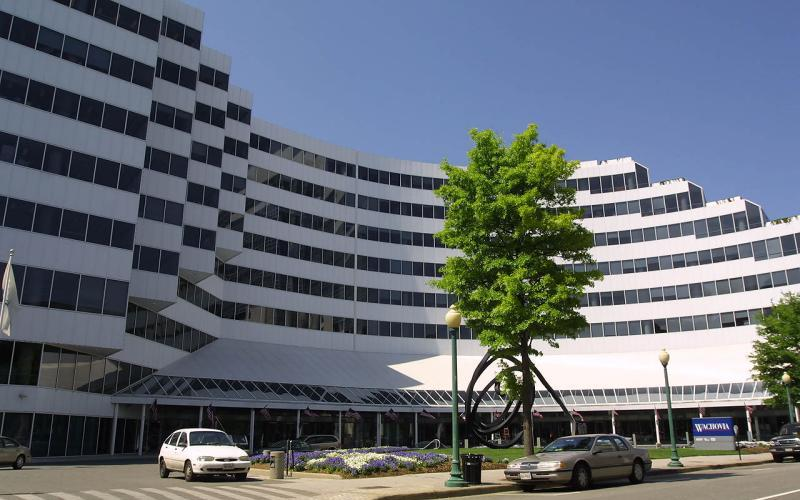
The Norfolk World Trade Center

Most major shipping lines have a permanent presence in the region with some combination of sales, distribution, and/or logistical offices, many of which are located in Norfolk. In addition, many of the largest international shipping companies have chosen Norfolk as their North American headquarters. These companies are either located at the Norfolk World Trade Center building or have constructed buildings in the Lake Wright Executive Center office park. The French firm CMA CGM, the Israeli firm Zim Integrated Shipping Services, and Maersk Line Limited, a subsidiary of the world's largest shipping line, A. P. Moller-Maersk Group, have their North American headquarters in Norfolk.

=== Corporate presence ===
As of 2026, major corporations headquartered in Norfolk include:

Name	Industry	Citation
Sentara Health	Healthcare	
Portfolio Recovery Associates	Finance	
Landmark Media Enterprises	Technology	
Dominion Enterprises	Technology	

=== Tourism ===
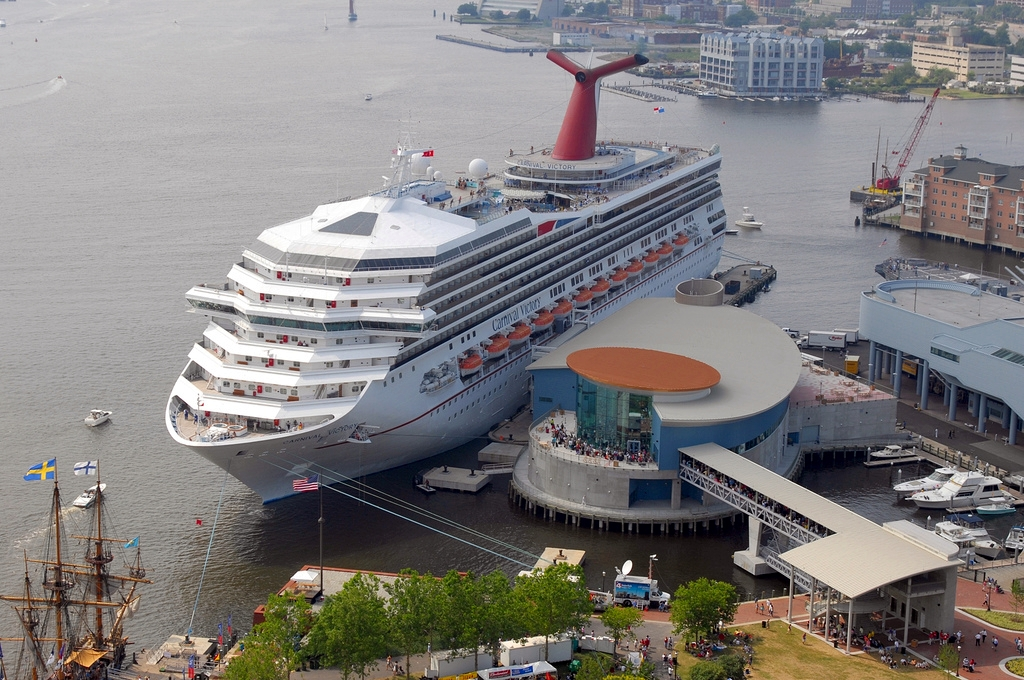
Half Moone Cruise & Celebration Center

Visit Norfolk is the destination marketing organization for the City of Norfolk. During fiscal year 2026, Visit Norfolk estimates that travelers spent $1.55 billion, creating $87.5 million in revenue and making tourism the 3rd-largest economic driver in Norfolk.

Norfolk's first cruise ship visited in 1996; since then, the City of Norfolk has invested millions of dollars in its cruise pier, the Half Moone Center. In 2026, over 390,000 cruise passengers visited Norfolk, generating $26 million over the fiscal year.

=== Workforce ===
As of 2023, the largest sectors in Norfolk by workforce were: Healthcare and social assistance (21,434); Accommodation and food services (11,703); Retail trade (11,353); Professional, scientific, and technical services (10,651); and Administrative and support, waste management, and remediation services (10,233).

As of 2012, 26% of the 130,000 people working in Norfolk live in the city, while 74% commute in. 37% of those come from Virginia Beach and 20% come from Chesapeake. An additional 51,575 people commute outside for work, with 35% going to Virginia Beach and 20% going to Chesapeake.

=== Top employers ===
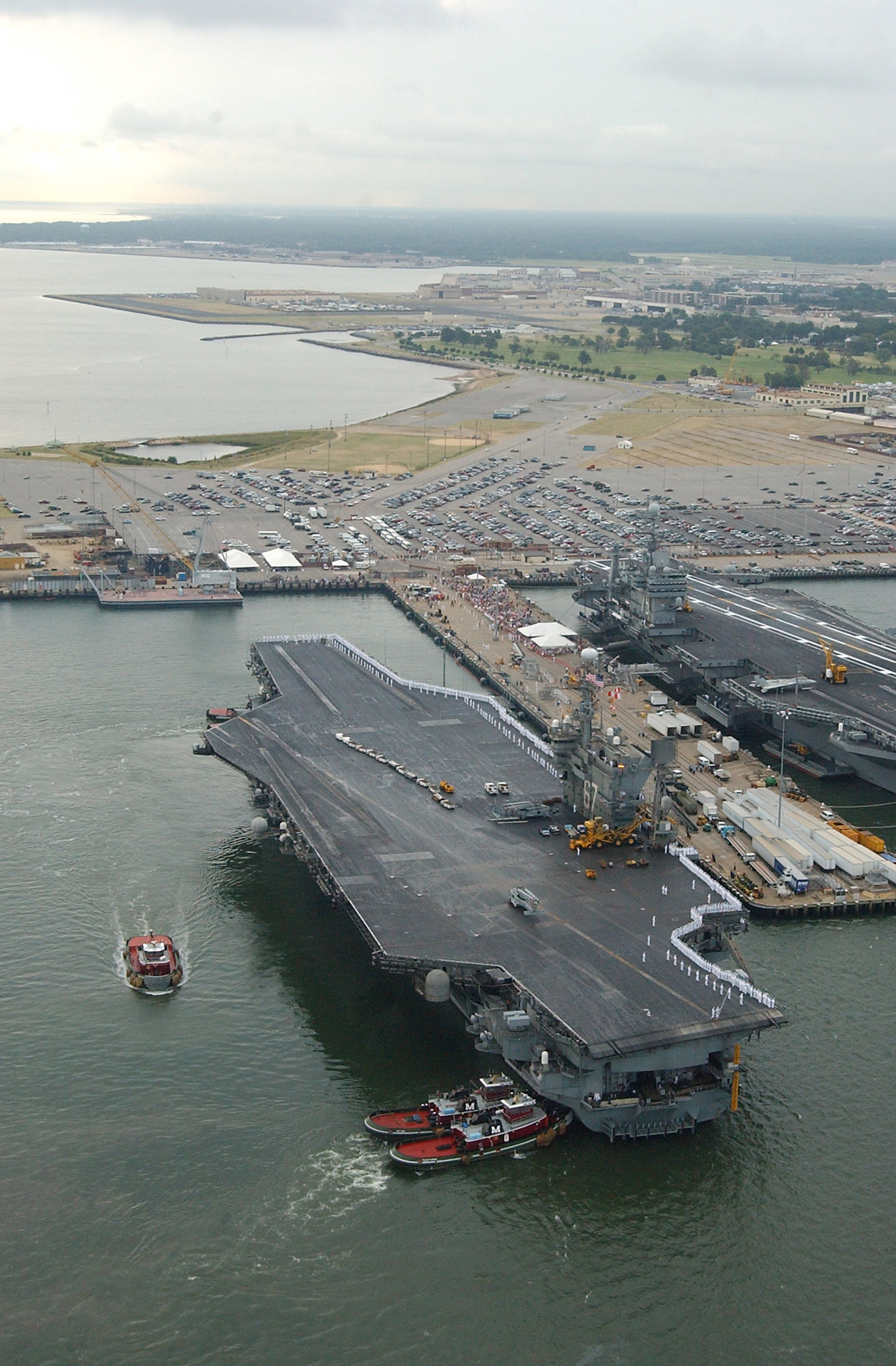
USS John F. Kennedy (CV-67) arriving at Naval Station Norfolk

As of 2024, below are the top employers in Norfolk:

#	Employer
1	U.S. Department of Defense
2	Sentara Healthcare
3	Norfolk City Public Schools
4	City of Norfolk
5	Old Dominion University
6	Children's Hospital of the King's Daughters
7	Sentara Health Management
8	Eastern Virginia Medical School
9	ADP
10	Security Forces, Inc.

== Arts and culture ==
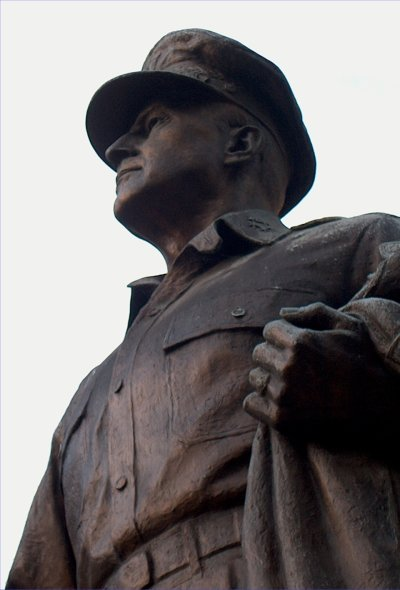
The Douglas MacArthur Statue

Due to its urban density, Norfolk acts as the cultural hub of the Hampton Roads region. In addition to its museums, Norfolk is the principal home for several major performing arts organizations. The city hosts numerous annual festivals and parades, many in Town Point Park or elsewhere in downtown.

=== Museums and galleries ===
The nationally acclaimed Chrysler Museum of Art, the area's most comprehensive art museum, has its campus at the intersection of the Ghent district, the Freemason neighborhood, and the NEON district. Since opening in 1933, the museum's main building has been expanded six times to allow for larger glass galleries, generous space for Impressionist and Baroque works, and more. Major improvements were completed in 2014, and today the museum features more than 50 galleries, a restaurant, and catering facilities, as well as galleries for traveling exhibits. Of particular note are the American neoclassical marble sculptures, the extensive glass collection, and the Glass Studio, which has live demonstrations daily.

The Chrysler Museum of Art also administers the 1792 Moses Myers House Museum in the Freemason District, next to MacArthur Mall. This museum interprets Norfolk's history and the lives and legacy of Norfolk's first Jewish family. Seventy percent of the objects in the home are original to the Myers in the early nineteenth century. The museum offers weekend tours and special monthly programming. In October 2022, the council of City of Norfolk, which owns the property, voted to proceed with the possibility of selling it, conjecturing the entirety of the property—the main house, the attached dwelling of the Myers’ enslaved servants, and the historic garden—could be sold as part of a package to developers, perhaps to operate as a bed and breakfast. Multiple entities, including the Norfolk Historical Society, have expressed distress and outrage.

The Hermitage Foundation Museum, located in an early 20th-century Tudor-style home on a 12-acre (49,000 m^{2}) estate fronting the Lafayette River, is found in the Lochaven neighborhood near the northern terminus of the Elizabeth River Trail that connects many of the city's sites of cultural interest. The Hermitage features an eclectic collection of Asian and Western art, including Chinese bronze and ceramics, Persian rugs, and ivory carvings, as well as changing exhibitions, arts classes, and special events. The Hermitage Foundation Museum is the only Smithsonian Affiliate in the Hampton Roads region.

Downtown Norfolk has several other museums of national significance.

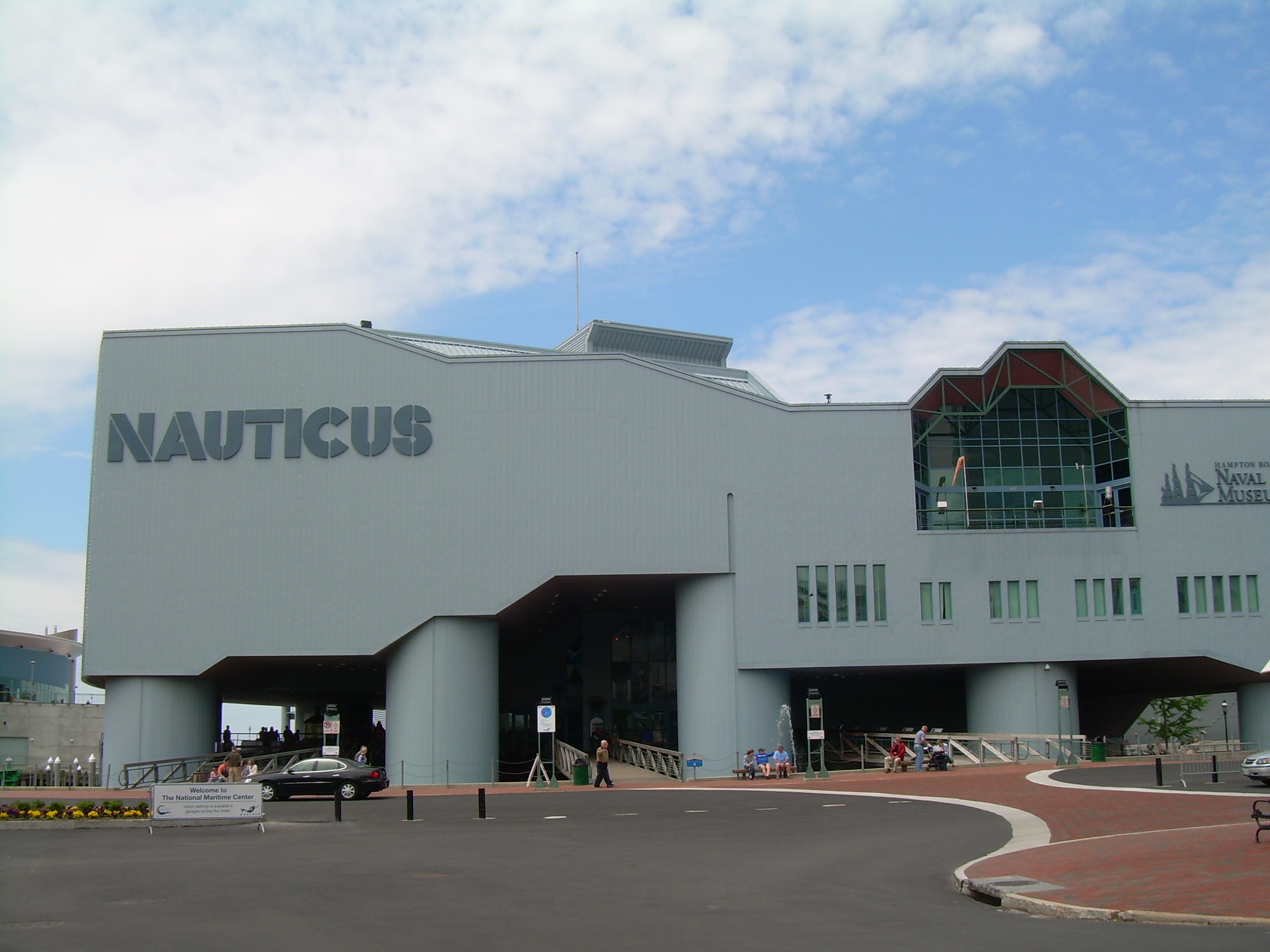
Nauticus (National Maritime Center)

Nauticus, the National Maritime Center, opened on the downtown waterfront in 1994. It features hands-on exhibits, interactive theaters, aquaria, digital high-definition films and an extensive variety of educational programs. Since 2000, Nauticus has been home to the battleship USS Wisconsin, the last battleship to be built in the United States. It served briefly in World War II and later in the Korean and Gulf Wars. Wisconsin Square is nearby.

The MacArthur Memorial, located in the nineteenth-century Norfolk courthouse and city hall in downtown, contains the tombs of General Douglas MacArthur and his wife, a museum and a vast research library, personal belongings (including his famous corncob pipe) and a short film that chronicles his life.

Speciality museums include the Hunter House Victorian Museum in the Freemason neighborhood and the Norfolk Southern Museum in downtown.

=== Public art ===
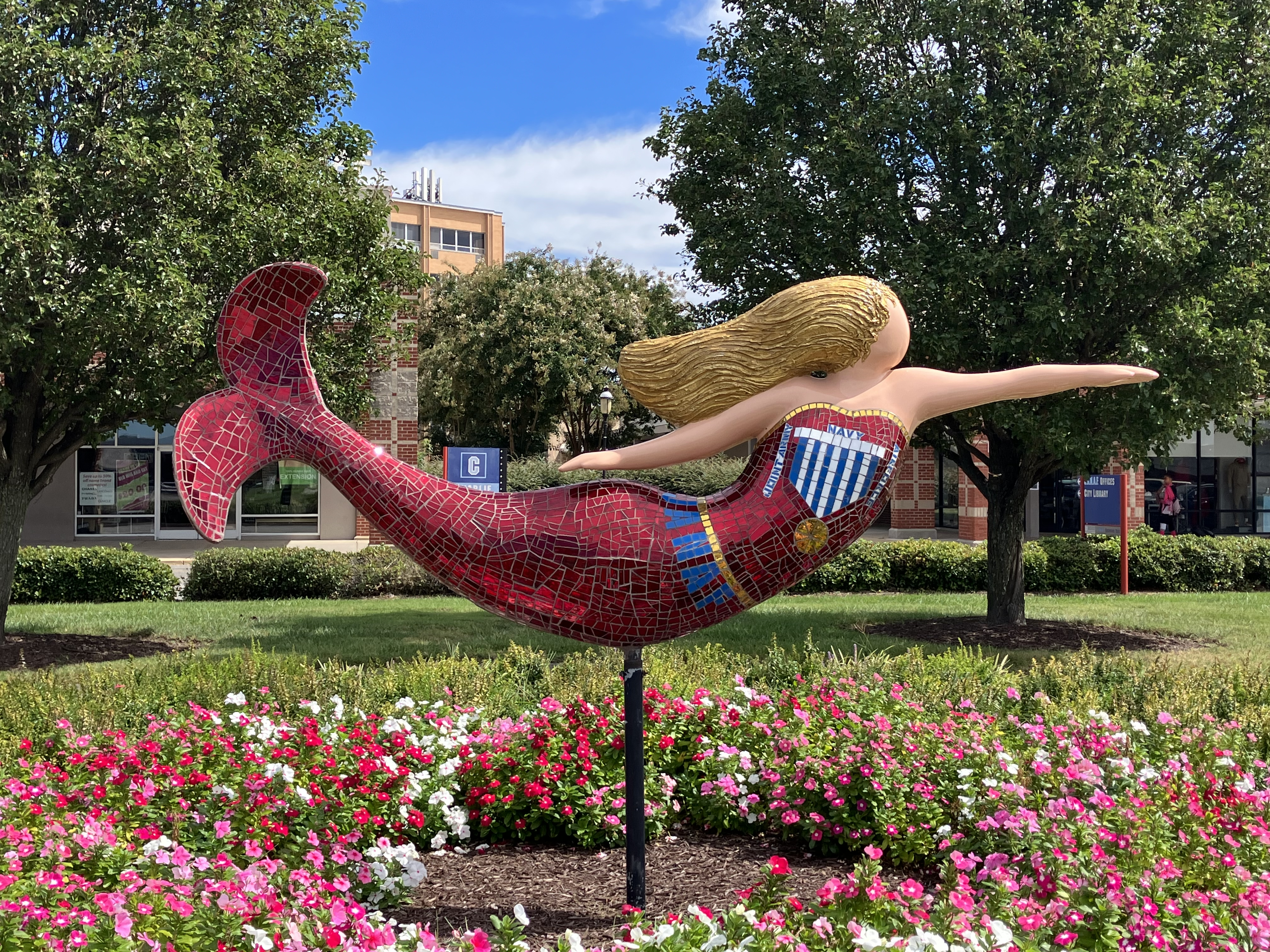
JANAF Shopping Center mermaid - "Jana"

The city is known for its "Mermaids on Parade," a public art program launched in 2002 to place mermaid statues all over the city. Tourists can take a walking tour of downtown and locate 17 mermaids while others can be found further afield.

The NEON district has dozens of murals, many of which are supported through the City of Norfolk's Public Arts Commission.

=== Performing arts ===
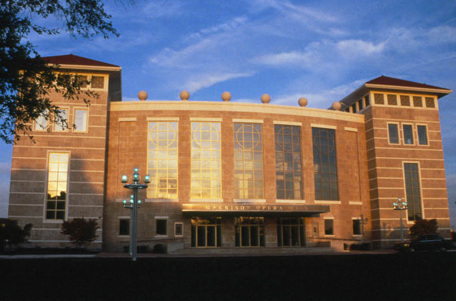
Harrison Opera House

Norfolk has a variety of performing groups with regular seasons and which also make appearances in the city's annual festivals. The Virginia Symphony Orchestra, founded in 1920, has been leader in the regional arts scene. Directed by JoAnn Falletta from 1991 until 2020, the orchestra's music director is now Erik Jacobsen. Most Norfolk performances take place at Chrysler Hall in the Scope complex downtown. The orchestra provides musicians for many other performing arts organizations in the area.

The Virginia Stage Company, founded in 1968, is one of the country's leading regional theaters and produces a full season of plays in the Wells Theatre downtown. The company shares facilities with the Governor's School for the Arts.'

The Virginia Opera was founded in Norfolk in 1974. Its artistic director since its inception has been Peter Mark, who conducted his 100th opera production for the VOA in 2008. Though performances are staged statewide, the company's principal venue is the Harrison Opera House in the Ghent district.

Large-scale concerts are held at either the Norfolk Scope arena or the Ted Constant Convocation Center at ODU, while The Norva provides a more intimate atmosphere for smaller groups. Other Norfolk cultural venues include the Attucks Theatre, the Jeanne and George Roper Performing Arts Center (formerly the Loew's State Theater) and the Naro Expanded Cinema.

=== Festivals ===
A range of arts and cultural festivals take place annually in Norfolk. The Virginia Arts Festival, founded in 1997, is based in Norfolk and has events throughout the region, drawing in arts from around the world and featuring local talent. One of the key events of the festival is the Virginia International Tattoo. The Norfolk NATO Festival, formerly the International Azela Festival, has taken place each spring since 1951 and is the longest continually running festival in the Hampton Roads Region. The Norfolk NATO Festival highlights Norfolk's role as the North American Headquarters of NATO and fosters cultural exchange and appreciation of NATO allies. The Stockley Gardens Art Festival, which takes place in parks the historic Ghent neighborhood, occurs twice yearly, in May and October. The festival draws vendors from well beyond the region and attracts upwards of 20,000 visitors. The St. Patrick's Day annual parade in the city's Ocean View neighborhood, on the northern edge of the city, celebrates Ocean View's rich Irish heritage.

Harborfest, the region's largest annual festival, celebrated its thirtieth anniversary in 2006. It is held during the first weekend of June in Town Point Park and celebrates the region's proximity and attachment to the water. The Parade of Sails (numerous tall sailing ships from around the world form in line and sail past downtown before docking at the marina), music concerts, regional food, and a large fireworks display highlight this three-day festival. Bayou Boogaloo and Cajun Food Festival, a celebration of the Cajun people and culture, had small beginnings. This three-day festival during the third week of June has become one of the largest in the region and, in addition to serving up Cajun cuisine, also features Cajun music. Norfolk's Fourth of July celebration of American independence contains a spectacular fireworks display and a special Navy reenlistment ceremony. The Norfolk Jazz Festival, though smaller by comparison to some of the big city jazz festivals, still manages to attract the country's top jazz performers. It is held in August. The Town Point Virginia Wine Festival has become a showcase for Virginia-produced wines and has enjoyed increasing success over the years. Virginia's burgeoning wine industry has become noted both within the United States and on an international level. The festival has grown with the industry. Wines can be sampled and then purchased by the bottle and/or case directly from the winery kiosks. This event takes place during the third weekend of October. There is also a Spring Wine Festival held during the second weekend of May.

=== Role in revitalization ===
The revitalization of downtown Norfolk has helped to improve the Hampton Roads cultural scene. Many of Norfolk's attractions are now connected by the 10.5-mile (16.9 km) long Elizabeth River Trail, a pedestrian and bike trail that winds along the city's waterfront. The trail's first segment of opened in 2003 on land donated by Norfolk Southern. A large number of clubs, representing a wide range of music interests and sophistication now line the lower Granby Street area. The nearby Waterside Festival Marketplace has also continued to be successful as a nightclub and bar venue.

== Parks and recreation ==
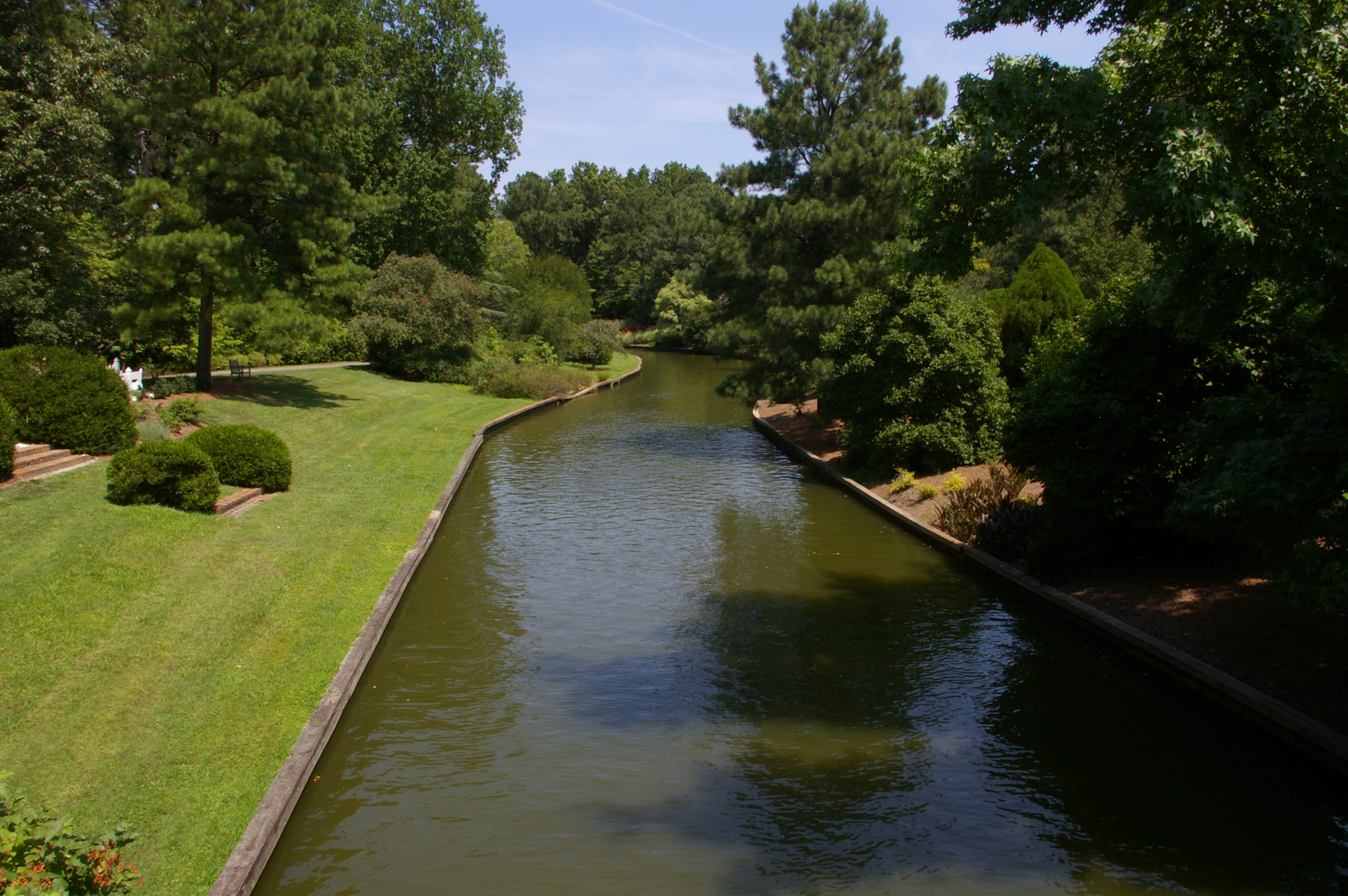
Canal at the Norfolk Botanical Garden

Norfolk has a variety of parks and open spaces in its city parks system. The city maintains three beaches on its north shore in the Ocean View area. Five additional parks contain picnic facilities and playgrounds for children. The city also has some community pools open to city residents. Town Point Park in downtown plays host to a wide variety of annual events from early spring through late fall.

The Norfolk Botanical Garden, opened in 1939, is a 155-acre (0.6 km^{2}) botanical garden and arboretum located near the Norfolk International Airport. It is open year-round.

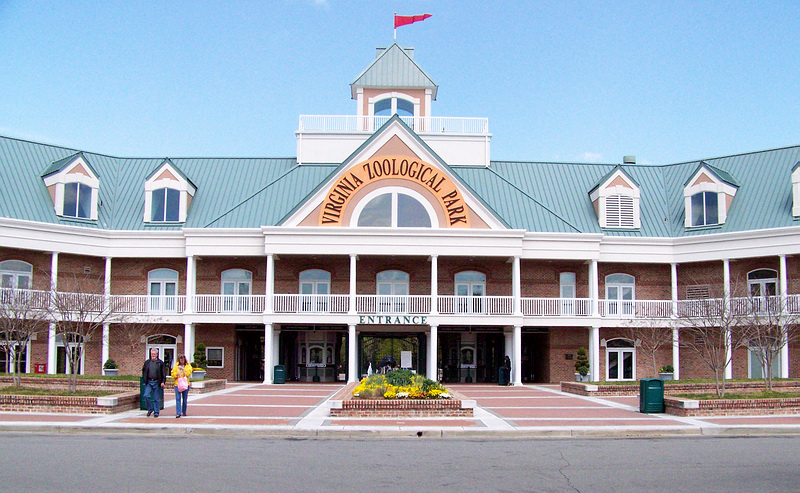
Virginia Zoo

The Virginia Zoo, opened in 1900, is a 65-acre (260,000 m^{2}) zoo with hundreds of animals on display, including the critically endangered Siberian tiger and threatened white rhino.

== Sports ==
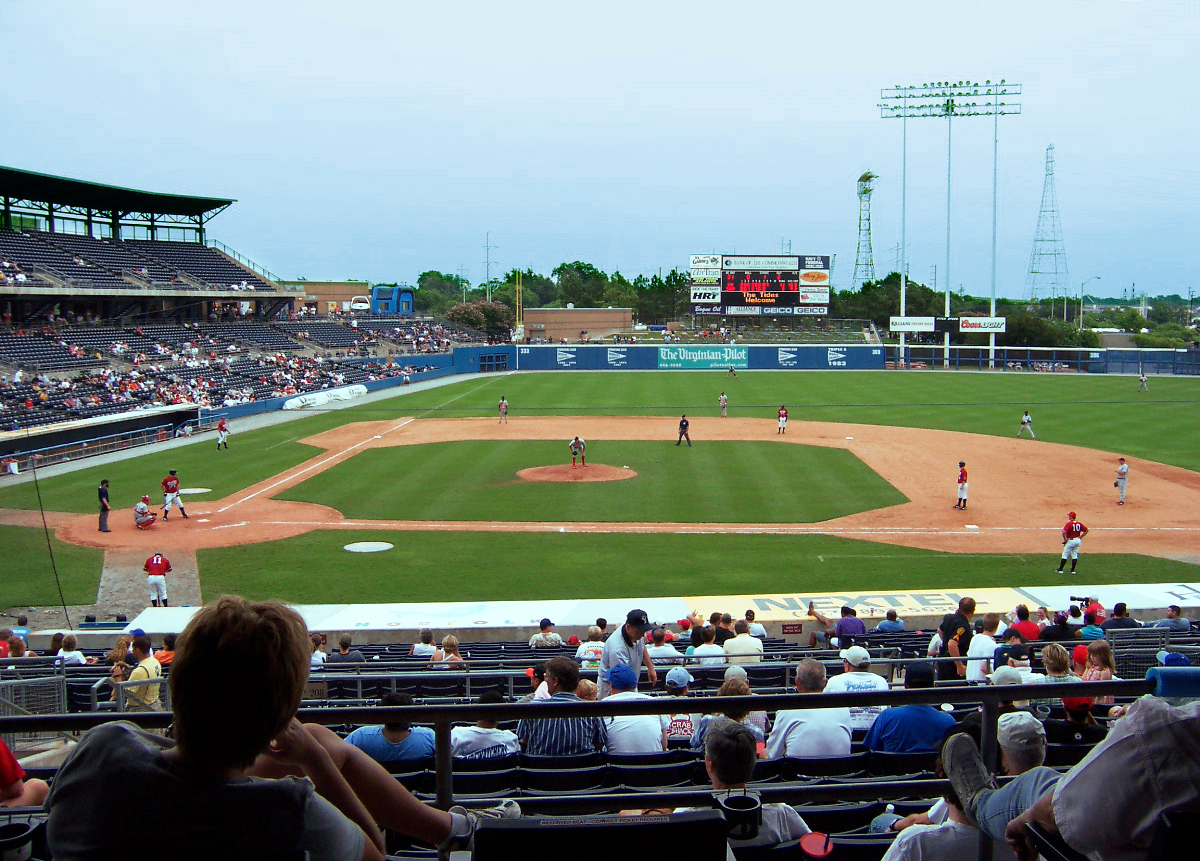
Harbor Park

Norfolk serves as home to the two highest level professional franchises in the state of Virginia — the Norfolk Tides play baseball in the International League, and the Norfolk Admirals play ice hockey in the ECHL.

Norfolk has two universities with Division I sports teams — the Old Dominion Monarchs and the Norfolk State University Spartans — which provide many sports including football, basketball, and baseball.

From 1970 to 1976, Norfolk served as the home court (along with Hampton, Richmond, and Roanoke) for the Virginia Squires regional professional basketball franchise of the now-defunct American Basketball Association (ABA). From 1970 to 1971, the Squires played their Norfolk home games at the Old Dominion University Fieldhouse. In November 1971, the Squires played their Norfolk home games at the new Norfolk Scope arena, until the team and the ABA league folded in May 1976.

In 1971, Norfolk built an entertainment and sports complex, featuring Chrysler Hall and the 13,800-seat Norfolk Scope indoor arena, located in the northern section of downtown. Norfolk Scope has served as a venue for major events including the American Basketball Association All-Star Game in 1974, and the first and second NCAA Women's Division I Basketball Championships (also known as the Women's Final Four) in 1982 and 1983.

Norfolk is also home to the Norfolk Blues Rugby Football Club. Their home playing fields are Lafayette Park in Norfolk and the Virginia Beach Sportsplex in Virginia Beach.

Virginia Beach City FC is an American professional soccer club based in Norfolk playing in the National Premier Soccer League (NPSL) in the Mid-Atlantic Conference of the Northeast Region. Home matches are played at Powhatan Field.

National Wrestling Alliance, Jim Crockett Promotions, World Championship Wrestling, and World Wrestling Entertainment have all presented wrestling shows at Norfolk Arena and the Scope from the 1960s to today, with many of these being Pay Per View events. Six-time World Heavyweight Wrestling Champion Lou Thesz lived in Norfolk and opened a wrestling school, Virginia Wrestling Academy, downtown in 1988.

== Government ==
=== National elections ===
United States presidential election results for Norfolk, Virginia
Year	Republican		Democratic		Third party(ies)	
Year	No.	%	No.	%	No.	%
1880	2,047	50.43%	2,012	49.57%	0	0.00%
1884	2,913	54.91%	2,392	45.09%	0	0.00%
1888	3,741	65.25%	1,969	34.35%	23	0.40%
1892	2,452	47.74%	2,587	50.37%	97	1.89%
1896	3,475	51.80%	3,068	45.73%	166	2.47%
1900	3,024	43.39%	3,883	55.72%	62	0.89%
1904	977	27.17%	2,559	71.16%	60	1.67%
1908	991	30.10%	2,271	68.99%	30	0.91%
1912	195	4.61%	3,539	83.70%	494	11.68%
1916	963	22.44%	3,234	75.35%	95	2.21%
1920	2,386	28.35%	5,953	70.73%	78	0.93%
1924	2,447	30.88%	5,061	63.87%	416	5.25%
1928	8,392	58.77%	5,888	41.23%	0	0.00%
1932	4,403	32.69%	8,814	65.45%	250	1.86%
1936	3,229	23.32%	10,561	76.26%	59	0.43%
1940	3,485	24.36%	10,783	75.38%	36	0.25%
1944	4,958	29.17%	12,010	70.66%	28	0.16%
1948	7,556	40.93%	9,370	50.76%	1,534	8.31%
1952	14,166	54.33%	11,862	45.49%	46	0.18%
1956	18,650	54.02%	14,571	42.20%	1,304	3.78%
1960	17,174	43.51%	22,037	55.83%	262	0.66%
1964	18,429	35.75%	32,388	62.83%	729	1.41%
1968	22,302	33.88%	28,477	43.26%	15,050	22.86%
1972	38,385	57.97%	25,737	38.87%	2,095	3.16%
1976	28,099	39.91%	39,295	55.82%	3,008	4.27%
1980	27,506	40.93%	35,118	52.26%	4,576	6.81%
1984	36,360	48.15%	38,913	51.53%	243	0.32%
1988	30,538	44.33%	37,778	54.84%	575	0.83%
1992	22,362	32.40%	37,602	54.47%	9,063	13.13%
1996	18,693	31.09%	37,655	62.63%	3,776	6.28%
2000	21,920	35.39%	38,221	61.70%	1,805	2.91%
2004	26,401	37.41%	43,518	61.67%	651	0.92%
2008	24,814	28.06%	62,819	71.03%	813	0.92%
2012	23,147	26.59%	62,687	72.02%	1,209	1.39%
2016	21,552	25.85%	57,023	68.38%	4,813	5.77%
2020	23,443	26.08%	64,440	71.69%	1,998	2.22%
2024	24,377	28.34%	59,941	69.69%	1,691	1.97%

Norfolk is heavily Democratic. Since 1900 it has only voted Republican in four elections, each of which was a national landslide. The last time it supported a Republican presidential candidate was in 1972, and since the turn of the century it has voted Democratic by over 60% in every election.

=== Organization ===
Norfolk is an independent city with services that both counties and cities in Virginia provide, such as a sheriff, social services, and a court system. Norfolk operates under a council-manager form of government.

Norfolk city government consists of a city council with representatives from seven districts serving in a legislative and oversight capacity, as well as a popularly elected, at-large mayor. The city manager serves as head of the executive branch and supervises all city departments and executing policies adopted by the council. Citizens in each of the five wards elect one council representative each to serve a four-year term. There are two additional council members elected from two citywide "superwards." The city council meets at City Hall weekly and, as of May 2023, consists of: Mayor Kenneth Cooper Alexander; Mamie Johnson, Ward 3; Danica Royster, Superward 7; John E. Paige, Ward 4; Courtney Doyle, Ward 2; Vice-Mayor Martin Thomas, Ward 1; Andria McClellan, Superward 6; Thomas R. Smigiel Jr. Ward 5.

The city government has an infrastructure to create close working relationships with its citizens. Norfolk's city government provides services for neighborhoods, including service centers and civic leagues that interact directly with members of city council. Such services include preserving area histories, home rehabilitation centers, outreach programs, and a university that trains citizens in neighborhood clean-up, event planning, neighborhood leadership, and financial planning. Norfolk's police department also provides support for neighborhood watch programs including a citizens' training academy, security design, a police athletic program for youth, and business watch programs.

Norfolk also has a federal courthouse for the United States District Court for the Eastern District of Virginia. The Walter E. Hoffman U.S. Courthouse in Norfolk has four judges, four magistrate judges, and two bankruptcy judges. Additionally, Norfolk has its own general district and circuit courts, which convene downtown. It is considered a Democratic stronghold.

Norfolk is located in Virginia's 3rd congressional district and has been served by U.S. representative Robert C. Scott (Democrat) since 1992.

=== Finances ===
During the 2024 fiscal year, the City of Norfolk reported $1.141 billion in revenue, a $31 million decrease from the previous year (by comparison, in the same year, Virginia Beach reported $2.093 billion and Chesapeake reported $1.106 billion in revenue).

As of June 2024, the City of Norfolk had $1.449 billion in debt, a decrease of $58 million (3.9%) since the past year. Major expenses include general government, Public Safety, and Education.

== Education ==
Norfolk City Public Schools, the public school system, comprises five high schools, eight middle schools, 34 elementary schools, and nine special-purpose/preschools. In 2005, Norfolk Public Schools won the $1 million Broad Prize for Urban Education for having demonstrated, "the greatest overall performance and improvement in student achievement while reducing achievement gaps for poor and minority students". The city had previously been nominated in 2003 and 2004. There are also a number of private schools located in the city, the oldest of which, Norfolk Academy, was founded in 1728. Religious schools located in the city include St. Pius X Catholic School, Alliance Christian School, Christ the King School, Norfolk Christian Schools and Trinity Lutheran School. The city also hosts the Governor's School for the Arts which holds performances and classes at the Wells Theatre.

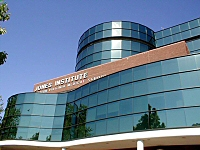
The Jones Institute for Reproductive Medicine at Eastern Virginia Medical School

Norfolk is home to three public universities and one private. It also hosts a community college campus in downtown. Old Dominion University, founded as the Norfolk Division of the College of William & Mary in 1930, became an independent institution in 1962 and now offers degrees in 68 undergraduate and 95 (60 masters/35 doctoral) graduate degree programs. Eastern Virginia Medical School, founded as a community medical school by the surrounding jurisdictions in 1973, is noted for its research into reproductive medicine and is located in the region's major medical complex in the Ghent district. Norfolk State University, founded in 1935 is the second largest HBCU, in Virginia. Norfolk State offers degrees in a wide variety of liberal arts, Social Work, Nursing, and Engineering. Virginia State University being the first largest HBCU in Virginia, which was founded in 1882. Virginia Wesleyan College is a small private liberal arts college and shares its eastern border with the neighboring city of Virginia Beach. Tidewater Community College offers two-year degrees and specialized training programs and is located in downtown. Additionally, several for-profit schools operate in the city.

=== Norfolk Public Library ===
Norfolk Public Library, Virginia's first public library, consists of one main library, two anchor libraries, nine branch libraries and a bookmobile. The library also has a local history and genealogy room and contains government documents dating back to the 19th century. The libraries offer services such as computer classes, book reviews, tax forms, and online book clubs.

The Slover Library, centrally located in the heart of downtown Norfolk, holds over 133,000 books and resources available for borrowing, hosts numerous classes and community events, houses the history Sargeant Memorial Collection, and offers studio spaces. Technology areas include a Sound Studio, Design Studio, Production Studio, YOUmedia lab, Maker Studio (Selden Market), and Computer Room and Training Lab.

==== Branches ====
- Barron F. Black Branch
- Blyden Branch
- Downtown Branch at Slover
- Janaf Branch
- Jordan-Newby Anchor Branch
- Lafayette Branch
- Larchmont Branch
- Little Creek Branch
- Mary D. Pretlow Anchor Branch
- Mobile Delivery
- Park Place Branch
- Richard A. Tucker Memorial
- Sargeant Memorial Collection
- Van Wyck Branch

== Media ==
Norfolk's daily newspaper is The Virginian-Pilot. Its alternative papers include the (now defunct) Port Folio Weekly, the New Journal and Guide, and the online AltDaily.com. Inside Business serves the regional business community with local business news.

Norfolk Post was published 13 January 1921 to 1 February 1924.

Local universities publish their own newspapers: Old Dominion University's Mace and Crown, Norfolk State University's The Spartan Echo, and Virginia Wesleyan College's Marlin Chronicles.

Coastal Virginia Magazine is a bi-monthly regional magazine for Norfolk and the Hampton Roads area.

Norfolk is served by a variety of radio stations on the AM and FM dials, with towers located around the Hampton Roads area. These cater to many different interests, including news, talk radio, and sports, as well as an eclectic mix of musical interests.

Norfolk is served by several television stations. The Hampton Roads designated market area (DMA) is the 42nd largest in the U.S. with 712,790 homes (0.64% of the total U.S.). Major network television affiliates include:

Channel	Callsign	Network(s)
3	WTKR	(CBS)
10	WAVY	(NBC)
13	WVEC	(ABC)
15	WHRO	(PBS)
27	WGNT	(Independent)
33	WTVZ	(MyNetworkTV)
43	WVBT	(Fox, The CW [DT2])
49	WPXV-TV	(ION Television)

Norfolk residents also can receive independent stations, such as WSKY broadcasting on channel 4 from the Outer Banks of North Carolina and WGBS-LD broadcasting on channel 11 from Hampton. Norfolk is served by Cox Cable which provides LNC 5, a local 24-hour cable news television network. DirecTV and Dish Network are also very popular as an alternative to cable television in Norfolk.

Several major motion pictures have been filmed in and around Norfolk, including Rollercoaster (filmed at the former Ocean View Amusement Park), Navy Seals, and Mission: Impossible III (partially filmed at the Chesapeake Bay Bridge Tunnel).

== Infrastructure ==
=== Transportation ===
Hampton Roads Bridge–Tunnel

The city has a long history as a strategic military and transportation point, where many railroad lines started. Norfolk was the terminus of the Atlantic and Danville Railway in 1890. It is linked to its neighbors by an extensive network of interstate highways, bridges, tunnels, and three bridge-tunnel complexes, which are the only bridge-tunnels in the United States.

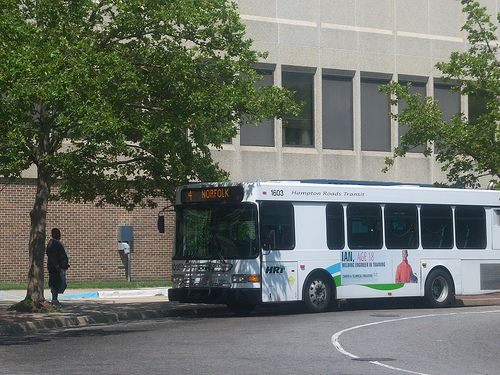
Hampton Roads Transit bus at Sentara Norfolk General Hospital

Norfolk is linked with its neighbors through an extensive network of arterial and Interstate highways, bridges, tunnels, and bridge-tunnel complexes. The major east–west routes are Interstate 64, U.S. Route 58 (Virginia Beach Boulevard) and U.S. Route 60 (Ocean View Avenue). The major north–south routes are U.S. Route 13 and U.S. Route 460, also known as Granby Street. Other main roadways in Norfolk include Newtown Road, Waterside Drive, Tidewater Drive, and Military Highway. The Hampton Roads Beltway (I-64 and I-664) makes a loop around Norfolk.

Norfolk is primarily served by the Norfolk International Airport (IATA: ORF, ICAO: KORF, FAA LID: ORF), now the region's major commercial airport. The airport is located near the Chesapeake Bay, along with the city limits straddling neighboring Virginia Beach. Seven airlines provide nonstop services to twenty five destinations. ORF had 3,703,664 passengers take off or land at its facility and 68,778,934 pounds of cargo were processed through its facilities. Newport News/Williamsburg International Airport also provides commercial air service for the Hampton Roads area. NNWIA is also the only airport in the region with direct international flights, as of February 2013. The Chesapeake Regional Airport provides general aviation services and is located 5 mi (8.0 km) outside the city limits.

Norfolk is served by Amtrak's Northeast Regional service through the Norfolk station, located in downtown Norfolk adjacent to Harbor Park stadium. The line runs west along Norfolk Southern trackage, paralleling the US Route 460 corridor to Petersburg, thence on to Richmond and beyond. A high-speed rail connection at Richmond to both the Northeast Corridor and the Southeast High-Speed Rail Corridor are also under study.

Greyhound Lines provides service from a central bus terminal in downtown Norfolk. The Virginia Breeze intercity bus line added service to Virginia Beach on April 20, 2026, stopping at an HRT park and ride on Military Highway. The added service, known as the Tidewater Current, connects to Virginia Beach, Newport News, Williamsburg, Richmond and Richmond International Airport, Charlottesville, and Staunton.

In April 2007, construction of the new $36 million Half Moone Cruise Terminal was completed downtown adjacent to the Nauticus Museum, providing a state-of-the-art permanent structure for various cruise lines and passengers wishing to embark from Norfolk. Previously, makeshift structures were used to embark/disembark passengers, supplies, and crew.

The Intracoastal Waterway passes through Norfolk. Norfolk also has extensive frontage and port facilities on the navigable portions of the Western and Southern Branches of the Elizabeth River.

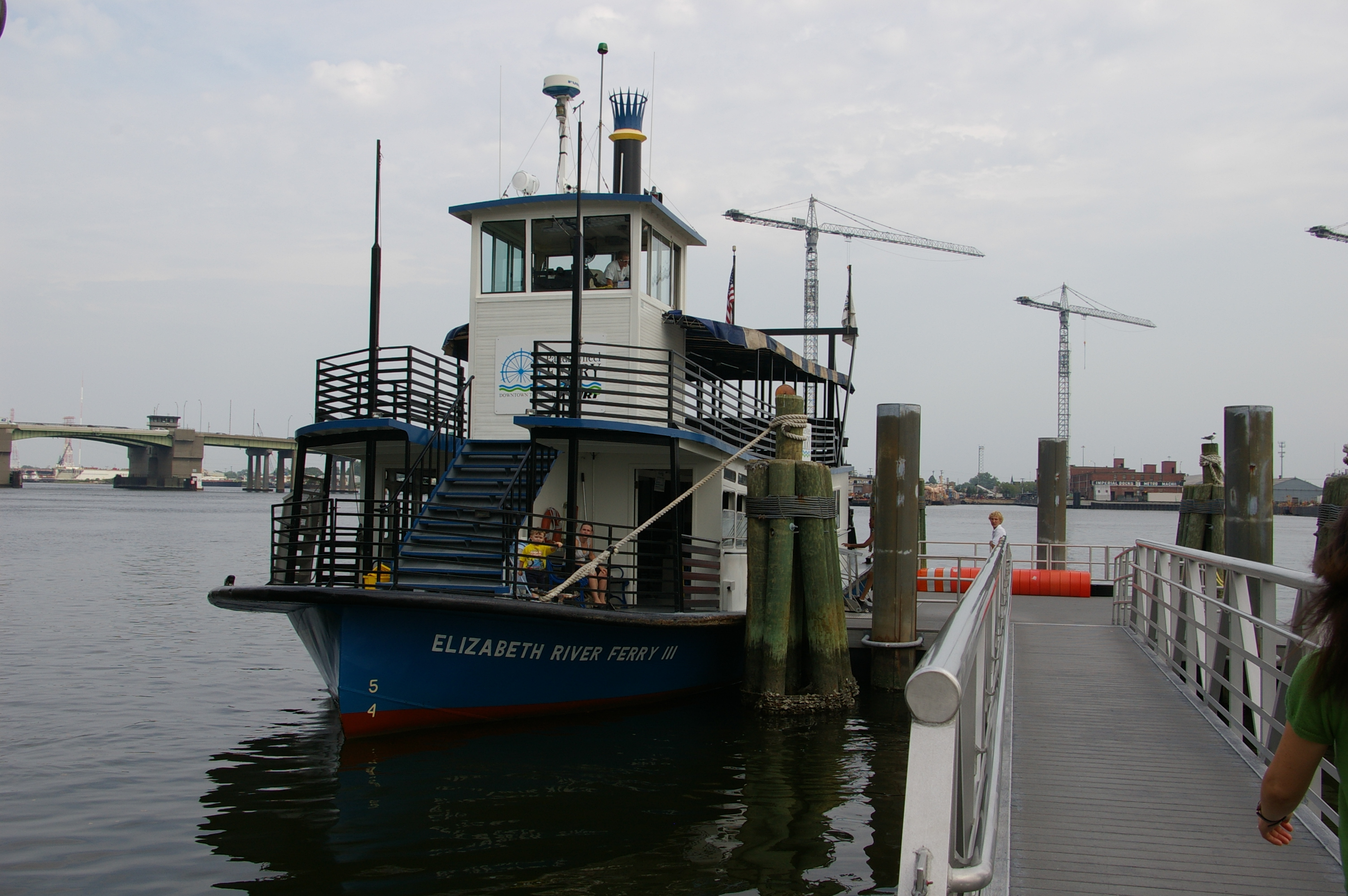
Ferry to Portsmouth

Light rail, bus, ferry and paratransit services are provided by Hampton Roads Transit (HRT), the regional public transport system headquartered in Hampton. HRT buses operate throughout Norfolk and South Hampton Roads and onto the Peninsula all the way up to Williamsburg. Other routes travel to Smithfield. HRT's ferry service connects downtown Norfolk to Old Town Portsmouth. Additional services include an HOV express bus to the Norfolk Naval Base, paratransit services, park-and-ride lots, and the Norfolk Electric Trolley, which provides service in the downtown area. The Tide light rail service began operations in August 2011. The light rail is a starter route running along the southern portion of Norfolk, commencing at Newtown Road and passing through stations serving areas such as Norfolk State University and Harbor Park before going through the heart of downtown Norfolk and terminating at Sentara Norfolk General Hospital. Hampton Roads Transportation, Inc. dispatches Black and White Cabs of Norfolk, Yellow Cab of Norfolk and Norfolk Checker Cab.

=== Utilities ===
Water and sewer services are provided by the city's Department of Utilities. Norfolk receives its electricity from Dominion Virginia Power which has local sources including the Chesapeake Energy Center (a gas power plant), coal-fired plants in Chesapeake and Southampton County, and the Surry Nuclear Power Plant. Norfolk-headquartered Virginia Natural Gas, a subsidiary of AGL Resources, distributes natural gas to the city from storage plants in James City County and Chesapeake.

Norfolk's water quality has been recognized one of the cleanest water systems in the United States and ranked as the fourth best in the United States by Men's Health. The city of Norfolk has a tremendous capacity for clean fresh water. The city owns nine reservoirs: Lake Whitehurst, Little Creek Reservoir, Lake Lawson, Lake Smith, Lake Wright, Lake Burnt Mills, Western Branch Reservoir, Lake Prince and Lake Taylor. The Virginia tidewater area has grown faster than the local freshwater supply. The river water has always been salty, and the fresh groundwater is no longer available in most areas. Currently, water for the cities of Chesapeake and Virginia Beach is pumped from Lake Gaston (which straddles the Virginia-North Carolina border) into the City of Norfolk's reservoir system and then diverted to the City of Chesapeake for treatment by the City of Chesapeake. Virginia Beach's portion of water is treated by the City of Norfolk at Moores Bridges water treatment plant and then piped into Virginia Beach. The pipeline is 76 mi (122 km) long and 60 in (1,500 mm) in diameter. Much of its follows the former right-of-way of an abandoned portion of the Virginian Railway. It is capable of pumping 60 million gallons of water per day; Virginia Beach and Chesapeake are partners in the project.

The city provides wastewater services for residents and transports wastewater to the regional Hampton Roads Sanitation District treatment plants.

=== Healthcare ===
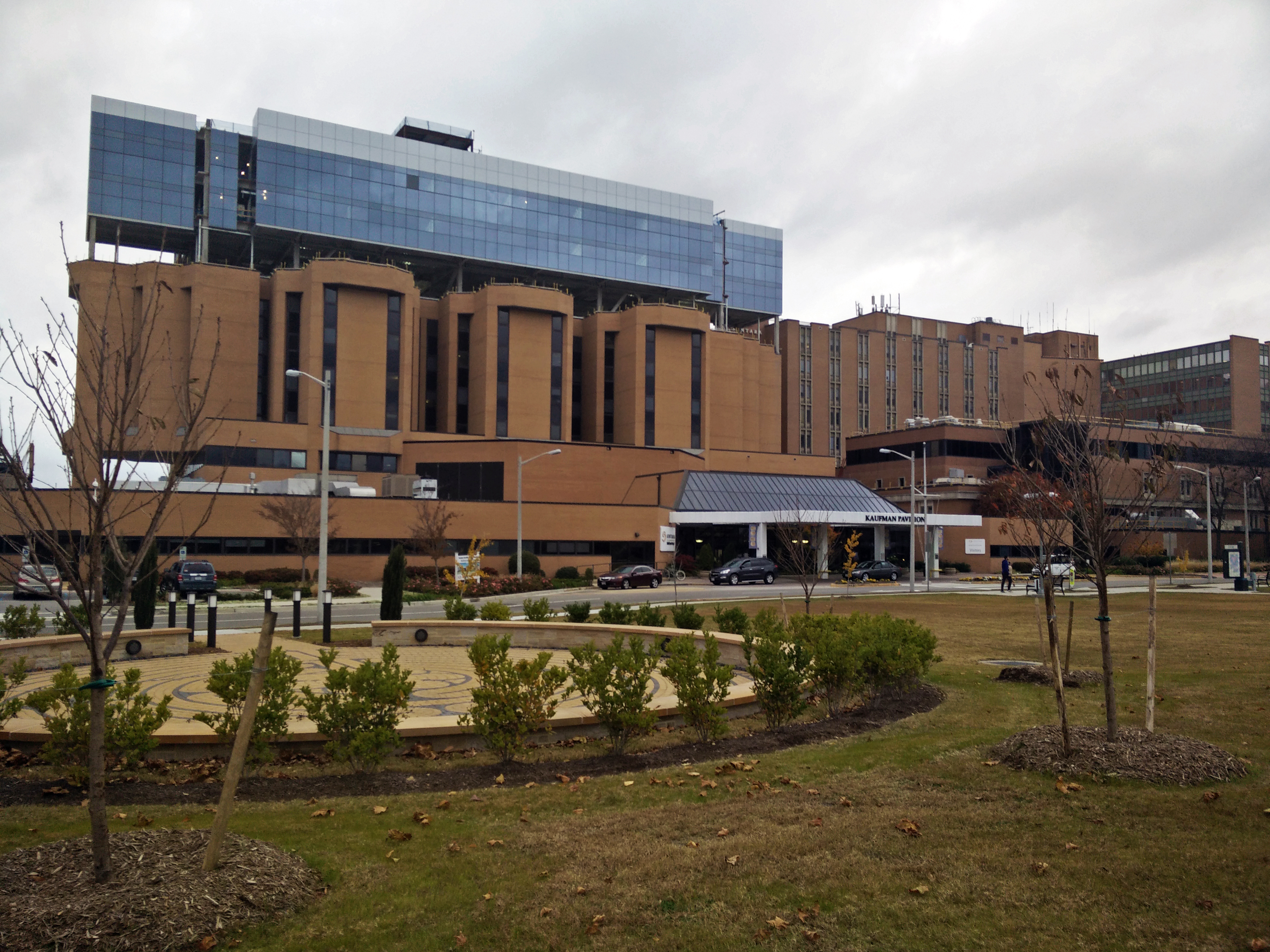
Sentara Norfolk General Hospital

Because of the prominence of the Naval Medical Center Portsmouth and the Hampton VA Medical Center in Hampton, Norfolk has had a strong role in medicine. Norfolk is served by Sentara Norfolk General Hospital, Sentara Leigh Hospital, and Bon Secours DePaul Medical Center. The city is also home to the Children's Hospital of The King's Daughters and Lake Taylor Transitional Care Hospital.

Norfolk is home to Eastern Virginia Medical School (EVMS), which is known for its specialists in diabetes, dermatology, and obstetrics. It achieved international fame on March 1, 1980, when Drs. Georgianna and Howard Jones opened the first in vitro fertilization clinic in the U.S. at EVMS. The country's first in-vitro test-tube baby was born there in December 1981.

The international headquarters of Operation Smile, a nonprofit organization that specializes in repairing facial deformities in underprivileged children from around the globe, is located in the city.

Physicians for Peace, a non-profit that focuses on providing training and education to medical professionals in the developing world, is based in Norfolk.

== Notable people ==
- Dennis Anderson, professional monster truck driver, creator, team owner and former driver of "Grave Digger" on the USHRA Monster Jam circuit
- Jimmy Archey, jazz trombonist 1920s–1960s
- Ella Josephine Baker, black American civil rights and human rights activist
- Steve Bannon, former executive chair of Breitbart News and former White House Chief Strategist under U.S. president Donald Trump
- Michael Basnight, NFL player
- Zinn Beck, MLB infielder, managed Norfolk Tars in 1928
- David S. Bill III, U.S. Navy rear admiral
- Aline Elizabeth Black, black American educator
- Peter Blair, Olympic freestyle wrestler, two-time NCAA wrestling champion, member of the National Wrestling Hall of Fame
- Gary U.S. Bonds, rhythm & blues singer
- Martha Haines Butt (1833–1871), author, suffragist
- Elizabeth Jordan Carr, the first baby in the United States conceived by in vitro fertilization, born at Sentara Norfolk General Hospital in 1981
- William Harvey Carney, soldier, Medal of Honor recipient
- Kam Chancellor, NFL safety for the Seattle Seahawks, Super Bowl champion and four-time Pro Bowl selection
- Clarence Clemons, saxophonist with Bruce Springsteen's E Street Band
- Matt Coleman III, college basketball player for Texas Longhorns, NBA player, player for Hapoel Haifa of the Israeli Basketball Premier League
- Michael Cuddyer, professional baseball player
- James Joseph Dresnok, American soldier who defected to North Korea after the Korean War
- Rob Estes, actor
- Samuel Face, inventor
- Hap Farber, NFL player
- Ryan Farish, musician, electronic producer
- Florian-Ayala Fauna, artist, musician
- Joseph T. Fitzpatrick, Virginia state senator
- Stephen Furst, actor
- Allan Glaser, film producer
- Grant Gustin, actor, The Flash, Glee
- Blanche Hecht Consolvo Cariaggi, singer, Italian countess
- Allan C. Hill, founder of the Great American Circus
- A. Byron Holderby Jr., Chief of Chaplains of the U.S. Navy
- Jalyn Holmes, defensive tackle for the Washington Commanders
- Louis Isaac Jaffe (1888–1950), editorial page editor of the Virginian-Pilot, Pulitzer Prize winner
- Knucks James, second baseman in Negro league baseball
- Hester C. Jeffrey, suffragette
- Chris Jones, football player
- Louisa Venable Kyle, writer
- Mary Lawson, All-American Girls Professional Baseball League player
- Jake E. Lee, rock guitarist
- Elaine Luria, member of the U.S. House of Representatives from Virginia's 2nd district, and former United States Navy Commander
- David McCormack, professional basketball player, NCAA champion with the Kansas Jayhawks
- Matt Maeson, musician
- Alex Marshall, journalist and author
- Robert E. Martinez, 8th Virginia Secretary of Transportation
- Samuel Mason, Revolutionary War soldier and American outlaw
- James Michael McAdoo, basketball player at University of North Carolina
- John Mullan, Army officer and builder of Mullan Road
- Lenda Murray, IFBB professional bodybuilder
- Thurop Van Orman, film director
- Barton Myers, architect
- Steven Newsome, arts and museum administrator
- Wayne Newton, singer and actor who resides in Las Vegas
- Norfolk Four, four US Navy men stationed at Norfolk in 1997: Danial Williams, Joseph J. Dick, Eric Wilson, and Derek Tice, and who were wrongfully convicted in 1999 and 2000 in a rape/murder case based on false confessions and sentenced to life. They were released from prison in 2009 under a conditional pardon. The last convictions were overturned in 2016, and they were granted full pardons in 2017 by Governor Terry McAuliffe. In December 2018 they received a settlement from the city and state.
- Nottz, musician, hip-hop producer
- Richard G. L. Paige, one of the first African-Americans delegates in Virginia
- John Parker, Abolitionist and inventor
- Barbara Perry, actress
- Hughie Prince, film composer and songwriter
- Ray Platte, NASCAR driver
- Emmy Raver-Lampman, actress and singer
- Leah Ray, singer and actress
- Tim Reid, actor, WKRP in Cincinnati
- Joseph Jenkins Roberts, first president of Liberia
- Larry Sabato, American political scientist
- Ed Schultz, American television and radio personality
- Rhea Seehorn, actress, Better Call Saul
- Deborah Shelton, actress, Miss Virginia USA 1970, Miss USA 1970
- Lemuel C. Shepherd Jr., Marine Corps General, Commandant of the Marine Corps, 1952–1955
- John Wesley Shipp, actor, The Flash
- Gray Simons, Olympic freestyle wrestler, four-time NAIA and three-time NCAA wrestling champion, member of the National Wrestling Hall of Fame
- Bruce Smith, NFL defensive end, 8x first team All-Pro and 11x Pro Bowl selection, member of the Pro Football Hall of Fame
- Jane Stuart Smith, operatic soprano, hymnologist, and author
- Keely Smith, singer and recording artist
- Joe Smith, former NBA basketball player
- Joseph Stika, Coast Guard vice admiral
- Margaret Sullavan, Oscar-nominated actress
- Timbaland, musician, hip-hop producer
- Doris Eaton Travis, dancer and actress
- Scott Travis, drummer for rock bands Racer X, Judas Priest, Fight and Thin Lizzy
- Justin Upton, MLB outfielder for Detroit Tigers
- Melvin Upton, Jr, MLB outfielder for Toronto Blue Jays
- Gene Vincent, member of Rock and Roll Hall of Fame
- Benjamin Watson, American football tight end
- Joe Weatherly, former NASCAR driver
- Pernell Whitaker, boxer, 1984 Olympic gold medalist and four-weight world champion
- Thomas Wilkins, symphony conductor
- Patrick Wilson, Golden Globe and Emmy-nominated actor
- Harold Wren (1921–2016), dean of three law schools
- David Wright, MLB third baseman for New York Mets, 7x All-Star
- Amore Wiggins (2006–c.2011), murder victim
- Mark Williams, NBA player for Charlotte Hornets played college basketball for Duke University
- Jane T. Worthington (1821–1847), American essayist and poet

== Sister cities ==
Current sister cities:

- Kitakyushu, Japan (1959 w/formerly Moji City)
- Wilhelmshaven, Germany (1976)
- Norfolk, England, United Kingdom (1986)
- Toulon, France (1989)
- Halifax, Nova Scotia, Canada (2006)
- Cagayan de Oro, Philippines (2008)
- Tema, Ghana (2010)
- Kochi, India (2010)

Former sister cities:

- Kaliningrad, Russia (1992–2022)

== See also ==
- Hunter House Victorian Museum
- List of tallest buildings in Norfolk
- List of U.S. cities with large Black populations
- National Register of Historic Places listings in Norfolk, Virginia
- Norfolk Anti-Inoculation Riot of 1768
- Norfolk Convention and Visitors Bureau
- Norfolk Police Department
- Norvella Heights
- USS Norfolk, 5 ships
