= Elizabeth River Tunnels Project =

Series of transportation projects in Hampton Roads area, Virginia, US

- Location: Norfolk, Portsmouth
- Proposer: Elizabeth River Crossings
- Project website: www.driveert.com
- Status: Open
- Type: Road
- Cost estimate: $2.1 billion
- Start date: July 2012
- Completion date: 2017 (Note: Construction will end on that date, however tolling, operation and maintenance of the project will continue until April 13, 2070)
- Stakeholders: Abertis; John Hancock Financial
- Supporters: Virginia Department of Transportation

The Elizabeth River Tunnels Project, a series of transportation projects in the South Hampton Roads region of Virginia, comprises the rehabilitation of the Downtown and existing Midtown Tunnels, the construction of a new parallel Midtown Tunnel, and the extension of the MLK Freeway/U.S. 58 to I-264. Intended to reduce congestion on area surface streets and arterial roads, the project was administered by Elizabeth River Crossings (ERC) and Virginia Department of Transportation (VDOT) as part of a 58-year public-private partnership. ERC maintains and operates the project ongoing.

== History ==
Transportation around South Hampton Roads is complicated by the various branches of the Elizabeth River (Virginia), which are crossed by two major highways. The busiest spur route in the area, I-264, crosses the river's Eastern Branch (via the Berkley Bridge) and its Southern Branch (via the Downtown Tunnel). Built in 1952, the westbound Downtown Tunnel is the oldest tunnel in Hampton Roads; much of it, including its ceiling tiles, has reached or exceeded its designed service life and requires repairs. The eastbound tube, built in 1987, also requires maintenance, as well as several updates to comply with NFPA 502 regulations.

The primary alternate route to the Downtown Tunnel is the Midtown Tunnel upstream. Built in 1962 to carry U.S. 58, the Midtown allows direct access to Portsmouth without passing through Downtown. Built with one lane in both directions, it served nearly 8,400 vehicles per day in its first operating year and nearly 40,000 per day in 2013, making it the "most heavily traveled two-lane road east of the Mississippi", according to the VDOT and ERC. Traffic is projected to rise to nearly 50,000 vehicles per day by 2026.

The Martin Luther King Jr. Freeway carries U.S. 58 after the Midtown Tunnel to its surface-street connection on London Boulevard in Portsmouth. As part of the long-term plan, regional leaders and VDOT looked to extend the freeway from its terminus at London Boulevard down to I-264, creating a highway-speed alternate that connected I-264 to the Midtown Tunnel and the new Western Freeway. Efforts to extend the MLK Freeway have been in the works with VDOT as far back as the early 1990s, when the agency completed its initial environmental assessment. The project received a new environmental assessment in 1999, when VDOT began pursuing the parallel Midtown Tunnel.

== Financing studies and public funding attempts ==
In June 2004, the Hampton Roads Planning District Commission wanted to add the parallel Midtown Tunnel and the extension of the Martin Luther King Freeway (along with several other congestion-relieving projects) to the 2026 Regional Transportation Plan (RTP). The construction cost was estimated at $686 million. However, the Commission removed the project from the RTP after concluding that state funding would be insufficient, and because VDOT determined that "reliance on a regional gas tax [was] not a reasonably foreseeable source of revenue" for the plan.

In 2006, the Hampton Roads Metropolitan Planning Organization (MPO) (formerly a subcommittee of the HRPDC, now known as the Transportation Planning Organization) concluded that new tolls could help secure funding for transportation projects that were removed from the 2026 RTP, including the Midtown Tunnel and MLK Extension. This would include tolling the parallel Downtown Tunnel to create a congestion-management plan to prevent the diversion of potential Midtown Tunnel traffic to a competing free facility. Both tunnels were initially tolled (25 cents, both ways) to pay off their construction bonds; both were made free in the late 1980s after the opening of the second (eastbound) Downtown Tunnel. Options included adding a 58-cent toll to the Midtown Tunnel (and a 19-cent toll to the MLK Extension), which could raise $427 million for the project; or adding a $2.05 peak/$1.50 off-peak toll for the Midtown, and a $2.20 peak/$1.60 off-peak for the Downtown Tunnel, which could raise nearly $4.8 billion. Based on this study, the MPO added the projects to the regions 2030 RTP, now estimated to cost around $779 million— if the Virginia General Assembly approved the new tolls and several tax increases.

After receiving the proposal, the General Assembly enacted House Bill 3202 introduced by State Delegate William J. Howell, which allowed the region to enact tolling on the project by creating the Hampton Roads Transportation Authority, as well as authorizing tax increases requested by the MPO to finance the other major projects in the region's plan, including the controversial civil remedial fees, a plan that would have allowed the HRTA to raise nearly $169 million in taxes in its first year. However, the authority's taxing authority was short-lived. On February 28, 2008, the State Supreme Court ruled in Marshall v. Northern Virginia Transportation Authority that the taxation authority granted to these non-elected bodies violated the Constitution of Virginia:

The General Assembly also may not accomplish through Chapter 896 [HB 3202], indirectly, that which it is not empowered to do directly, namely, impose taxes on the citizenry in the absence of an affirmative, recorded vote of a majority of all members elected to each body of the General Assembly. Thus, by enacting Chapter 896 [HB 3202], the General Assembly has failed to adhere to the mandates of accountability and transparency that the Constitution requires when the General Assembly exercises the legislative taxing authority permitted by the Constitution. If payment of the regional taxes and fees is to be required by a general law, it is the prerogative and the function of the General Assembly, as provided by Article IV, Section 1 of the Constitution, to make that decision, in a manner which complies with the requirements of Article IV, Section 11 of the Constitution.

The opinion did not find the existence of the HRTA (or the NVTA for that matter) to be unconstitutional, nor did it strike the authority of the regional authorities to impose tolling on the roadways.

== Public–private partnership ==
As early as 2004 while the political wrangling continued, VDOT had determined that in order to fund the project, it would need to be a public-private venture, sending out an informal request for information for private entities interested in pursuing such a project. Three companies expressed an interest in the project, including Skanska. Both Skanska and one of the other interested parties stated that tolling on the Downtown Tunnel and the Midtown Tunnel would bring about the best financial outcome for completing the project. Following that, VDOT began the process to solicit bids from private companies to partner with the state in executing the Elizabeth River Tunnels Project (which now included the rehabilitation of the Downtown Tunnel) through Virginia's Public Private Transportation Act. Transportation Secretary Pierce R. Homer said that "It desperately needs upgrading." and that "it's a very expensive project and we have no public‐sector resources to pay for it.", which was underscored in the solicitation request, which stated that "user tolls will ultimately pay for the work". Ultimately, although three companies expressed an interest, only one actually submitted a proposal, which was what is now Elizabeth River Crossings.

After the lengthy review process required under the PPTA, then-Governor Bob McDonnell and VDOT executed the Comprehensive Agreement with ERC on December 5, 2011. Under the agreement, VDOT retains ownership and oversight of the tunnels, while ERC finances, builds, operates and maintains the facilities for a 58-year concession period. Funding is expected from tolls, private equity, contributions from the Commonwealth and a low-interest Federal Highway Administration loan. ERC is responsible for paying back all debt on the project, as well as assumes the entire risk of a decrease in toll revenue if traffic counts do not meet projections. However, if traffic exceeds projections and increases revenue, VDOT will receive a portion of the excess revenue, after all other costs and debt service has been paid for the period.

The deal reached financial close on April 13, 2012. The cost of the project, at financial close was $2.1 billion. ERC eventually received $300 million from VDOT, $663.75 mil from the Virginia Small Business Financing Authority and $422 million from the U.S. Department of Transportation, all of which went to pay down the toll rate. The 58-year concession period will end on April 13, 2070.

== Tolling ==
The agreement gave ERC the authority to impose tolling on the roadway in order to recoup the private parties the money they put into the project. Initially, ERC estimated the toll rate to be between $2–3 (for cars), however the Comprehensive Agreement scheduled the tolls to begin at rates of $1.59/non-peak hours and $1.84/peak for cars and $4.77/non-peak and $7.34/peak for heavy vehicles after the infusion of VDOT and FHWA money and the extra eight years added to the concession. However, after public outcry at the rates, the incoming governor, Terry McAuliffe announced a further, $82.5 million buydown of the tolls through the completion of the construction. This buydown reduced tolls to 75-cents/off peak and $1.00/peak for the light vehicles, and $2.25 during non-peak or $4.00 during peak hours for heavy vehicles. Under Gov. McAuliffe's plan, toll rates would increase by 25-cents each year until January 2017 or until the new Midtown Tunnel is completed, at which point they would return to the rates set in the Comprehensive Agreement.

After 2017, rates increase annually by a factor equal to the greater of changes to Consumer Price Index or 3.5 percent.

== Project description ==
Each level of the project was laid out in detail in the Comprehensive Agreement as four separate projects/services, along with the dates that construction on them must be substantially completed to avoid the contract penalties.

=== Downtown Tunnel and Midtown Tunnel rehabilitation work ===
The Downtown & Midtown Tunnel Rehabilitation Project consisted of 15 projects to bring the tunnels up to NFPA 502 standards, plus:

- Removing the suspended ceiling of the eastbound tunnel. (The westbound tunnel tiles were removed in 2011 for safety.)
- Replacing old lights with energy-efficient LEDs.
- Adding seven sets of jet ventilation fans (14 per tunnel).
- Removing police booths and other cosmetic rehab work.

Rehabilitation work on the westbound Downtown Tunnel (Norfolk to Portsmouth) began on August 9, 2013. The plan initially called for closing the tunnel on about 25 consecutive weekends from 8 p.m. Friday to 5 a.m. Monday, with traffic to be primarily detoured to the High Rise Bridge using I-464. One-lane closures were not feasible because most of this work required overhead work (such as installing the fireproofing on the ceiling), or work that would cross the centerline. But after several weekends of closures, public outcry from businesses and citizens of Portsmouth forced VDOT and ERC to reconsider the plan. Portsmouth City Council asked VDOT to look at turning the eastbound tunnel into a two-way tunnel during the weekend closures, an idea VDOT and ERC had initially ruled out, insisting that "maintaining two lanes of eastbound traffic in the eastbound Downtown Tunnel while directing westbound traffic towards one of the four alternative routes (with the I-64 High Rise Bridge as the primary detour) is the best course of action, both for the Project and the traveling public." Eventually, ERC changed the plan from full weekend closures to nightly closures from 8 p.m. to 5 a.m.

Rehabilitation work on the eastbound tunnel began on July 25, 2014. ERC scheduled full weekend closures on the eastbound tunnel and little to no resistance was felt from city leaders or residents. To minimize delays, work on the Midtown Tunnel will begin after the completion of the new Midtown Tunnel.

The Downtown Tunnel rehabilitation work ended August 16, 2016.

=== Parallel Midtown Tunnel construction ===
The Midtown Tunnel Construction consists of the fabrication and installation of the new, parallel Midtown Tunnel, as well as upgrading & replacing the Brambleton Ave/Hampton Boulevard interchange, which leads directly to the tunnel. Fabrication of the tunnel's 11 concrete elements began in November 2012 in Sparrows Point, Maryland and are towed down the Chesapeake Bay to the Project site in Portsmouth for immersion and placement under the Elizabeth River. As of March 2015, the first six elements are in place and production of the remaining five tunnel elements is in progress. Upon completion of construction, traffic in the existing Midtown Tunnel will be converted to one-way eastbound from Portsmouth to Norfolk and the new 2-lane tunnel will carry westbound traffic from Norfolk to Portsmouth.

The scheduled completion date of the new Midtown Tunnel is December 24, 2016. ERC will face the steepest penalty of all the projects -- $21,000 a day—if this project is not completed by its completion date. For the rehabilitation work on the Midtown Tunnel, ERC will face the same penalty as for the work on the Downtown tunnel ($7,000/day), if the work is not completed by May 11, 2018.

ERC completed the new tunnel a half year ahead of schedule, and opened the new, westbound tunnel to traffic at 1:40pm EST on June 17, 2016. Rehabilitation work on the Midtown was completed early as well, by mid-2017.

=== Martin Luther King Expressway ===
The Martin Luther King Freeway Project consists of extending the freeway from U.S. 58/London Boulevard to an interchange with I-264 with an interchange at High Street (which carries U.S. 17 to the east of its interchange with U.S. 58). This requires the permanent closure of two I-264 ramps: eastbound to Des Moines Ave, and Westbound to South Street, in accordance with the projects FHWA approval of the VDOT proposal.

Construction on the extension began in November 2014 and was completed in 2016.

=== Maintenance and operations ===
Operational control of the tunnel system was turned over to ERC on July 12, 2012. Under the agreement's turnover plan, ERC is responsible for all maintaining and operating:

- I-264 from the west end of the Berkley Bridge, through the Downtown Tunnel to the west end of the MLK Freeway ramps in Portsmouth,
- from the Brambleton Ave/Hampton Blvd interchange in Norfolk, up to the West Norfolk Bridge, and
- from the West Norfolk Bridge along the Martin Luther King Freeway.

The boundaries for incident management, which includes removal of disabled/wrecked vehicles as well as snow removal, extends the above limits:

- from the West Norfolk Bridge westbound to the eastern end of the W. Norfolk Road overpass on the Western Freeway in Portsmouth (not including the offramps),
- from the Waterside Drive/City Hall Avenue/Tidewater Drive interchange (Note: Specifically this includes the E. City Hall Ave on ramp to I-264, the I-264 East off ramp to Waterside Drive and Market Street (ending at the surface grade), the I-264 East off ramp to Tidewater Drive (ending on the bridge just after crossing City Hall Ave.) and I-264 East Mainline until the end of the barrier between highway traffic and oncoming Tidewater Drive traffic.) westbound across the Berkley Bridge in Norfolk continuing to the western end of the future MLK Freeway ramps in Portsmouth (Note: This includes the entire Effingham St. Exit from I-264 West, ending where Bart St. merges with off-ramp traffic heading westbound towards Effingham St. and at the intersection of Bart St. and Court St. heading eastbound as well as the Crawford Street South entrance to I-264.), and
- all of the MLK Expressway itself.

== See also ==
- Public-private partnerships in the United States
