= Martin Luther King Jr. Expressway (Portsmouth) =

Martin Luther King Freeway
- Martin Luther King Freeway highlighted in red

Route information
- Maintained by Elizabeth River Crossings
- Length: 1.5 mi (2.4 km)
- Component highways: US 58; SR 164

Major junctions
- South end: I-264 / US 460 Alt.
- US 58 (London Boulevard)
- North end: SR 164 (Western Freeway)

Location
- Country: United States
- State: Virginia
- Independent cities: Portsmouth

Highway system
- United States Numbered Highway System; List; Special; Divided; Virginia Routes; Interstate; US; Primary; Secondary; Byways; History; HOT lanes

The Martin Luther King Freeway is a five-mile-long (8.0 km) stretch of U.S. Route 58 (US 58) in the state of Virginia that connects State Route 164 (SR 164, Western Freeway) and the Midtown Tunnel complex with midtown Portsmouth at London Boulevard (which continues on and carries the US 58 designation to points west), continuing past High Street near US 17 and ending at Interstate 264 (I-264) in a full interchange that opened on March 28, 2017.

== Route description ==
The freeway effectively begins at the Pinners Point Interchange where the West Norfolk Bridge carries the Western Freeway across the Western Branch of the Elizabeth River, and where US 58 emerges from the Midtown Tunnel. It then continues south, connecting to London Boulevard in a full interchange, where it loses its US Route 58 designation as that route exits as part of London Boulevard. Continuing as SR 337, there is a partial interchange at High Street before the terminus with a full interchange at I-264/Alternate US Route 460.

== Extension and tolling ==
As part of the long-term plan to improve the Midtown Tunnel connection, regional leaders and VDOT looked to extend the freeway from its terminus at High Street to I-264, creating a highway-speed alternate that connected not only I-264 to the Midtown Tunnel, but to the newly built Western Freeway as well. Efforts to extend the MLK Freeway have been in the works with VDOT as far back as the early 1990s, when the agency completed its initial environmental assessment. The project again went through an environmental assessment in 1999, which was also the same time that VDOT began effectively pursuing the parallel Midtown Tunnel.

The extension became part of the Elizabeth River Tunnels Project when VDOT offered it as part of the public-private partnership solicitation in 2008. After the lengthy review process required under the PPTA, then-Governor Bob McDonnell and VDOT executed the Comprehensive Agreement with ERC on December 5, 2011. Under the agreement, VDOT retains ownership and oversight of the tunnels and the MLK Freeway, while ERC finances, builds, operates and maintains the facilities for a 58-year concession period.

The Martin Luther King Freeway portion of the project consists of extending the freeway from the end of the U.S. 58 concurrency terminus at London Boulevard to an interchange with I-264 with an interchange at High Street. Construction on the extension began in November 2014, with a completion date of March 28, 2017. In order to be built to freeway standards, it will eliminate all cross street traffic, including that at High Street, which will instead become a limited interchange. The other streets that were closed as a part of the project were either rerouted or turned into cul-de-sacs. The project also required the permanent closure of two I-264 ramps: I-264 East exit to Des Moines Ave, and I-264 entrance ramp from South Street.

After the extension is completed, the entire route will also then become the designated VA 164 Freeway. Although the freeway will run north and south nominally, the freeway will be signed as east and west, to continue the concurrency of VA 164.

=== Toll rates ===
Originally, the MLK Freeway was to be tolled $1.00 for non-tunnel users and $.50 for users who also travel through the tunnel. However, Virginia Governor Terry McAuliffe announced on July 10, 2015, that $78 million of construction money originally designated for the now defunct Route 460 project (which was another PPP approved by his predecessor, Bob McDonnell) would be reallocated to buy out the MLK Freeway tolls for the remainder of the concession period.

== Major intersections ==
The entire route is in Portsmouth.

| mi | km | Destinations | Notes |
|---|---|---|---|
| 0.00 | 0.00 | US 58 east – Tunnel, Norfolk | Western terminus of concurrency with US 58 |
| | | SR 164 west to I-664 – Suffolk, Newport News | Last exit before tunnel; western terminus of concurrency with SR 164 |
| | | Port Norfolk | No southbound access from SR 164 entrance ramp |
| | | US 58 west (London Boulevard) to I-264 – Suffolk | Eastern terminus of concurrency with US 58; southbound exit and northbound entrance |
| | | SR 141 south (London Boulevard) – Downtown Portsmouth | Southbound exit and northbound entrance |
| | | SR 337 (High Street) to SR 337 Alt. / I-264 / US 58 | Former at-grade intersection; eastbound entrance and westbound exit |
| | | I-264 / US 460 Alt. / SR 164 ends – Norfolk, Suffolk | Eastern terminus of both Martin Luther King Freeway and SR 164 |
1.000 mi = 1.609 km; 1.000 km = 0.621 mi: Closed/former; Concurrency terminus; Incomplete access; Unopened

== See also ==
- List of streets named after Martin Luther King Jr.
