= Virginia State Route 164 =

State highway in southeastern Virginia, US

State Route 164

- SR 164 highlighted in red

Route information
- Maintained by VDOT and Elizabeth River Crossings
- Length: 12.17 mi (19.59 km)
- Existed: by 1969–present

Major junctions
- West end: US 17 in Suffolk
- I-664 in Suffolk; SR 135 in Suffolk; US 58 / SR 141 in Portsmouth
- East end: I-264 in Portsmouth

Location
- Country: United States
- State: Virginia
- Counties: City of Suffolk, City of Portsmouth

Highway system
- Virginia Routes; Interstate; US; Primary; Secondary; Byways; History; HOT lanes
← SR 163	→ SR 165

State Route 164 (SR 164) is a 7.27-mile-long (11.70 km) primary state highway in the U.S. state of Virginia that connects the northern parts of Suffolk and Portsmouth with Newport News and Hampton via Interstate 664 (I-664) with Downtown Portsmouth and Norfolk through either the Downtown or Midtown Tunnels.

The first section, known as the Western Freeway, is a four- to six-lane freeway that runs from U.S. Route 17 (US 17) in Suffolk east to the Pinners Point Interchange, which was its previous terminus. However, when the extension to the Martin Luther King Jr. Expressway opened in December 2016, the terminus was relocated to an interchange with Interstate 264.

Although SR 164 is a freeway, bicycles and pedestrians, but not mopeds, are allowed over the West Norfolk Bridge between West Norfolk Road and a pair of special ramps to Bayview Boulevard and Florida Avenue.

== Route description ==
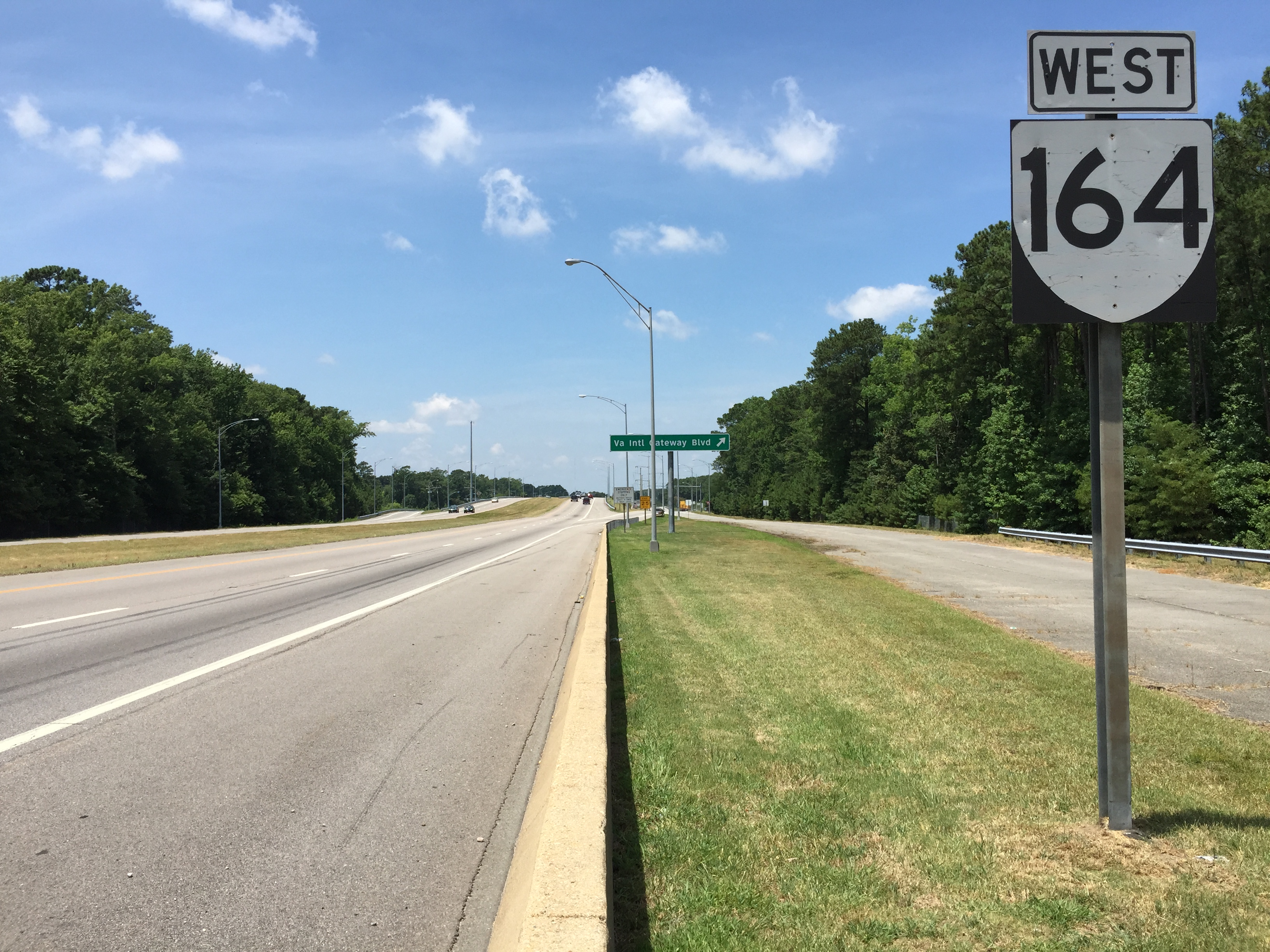
View west along SR 164 in Portsmouth

SR 164 begins as a pair of two-lane flyover ramps from southbound US 17 (Bridge Road) and to northbound US 17, in the direction of the James River Bridge, in the Belleville area of the independent city of Suffolk. Eastbound SR 164 receives another ramp from US 17, then the freeway meets I-664 (Hampton Roads Beltway) at a partial cloverleaf interchange that includes a flyover ramp from southbound I-664 to eastbound SR 164. Just east of the interchange, the eastbound carriageway crosses over the Commonwealth Railway, which settles into the media of SR 164. The state highway has a partial diamond interchange with SR 135 (College Drive) that allows access to the crossroad to and from the direction of Portsmouth, which the freeway enters immediately to the east of the interchange.

SR 164 and the railroad pass to the north of the community of Churchland, which is served via a diamond interchange with Towne Point Road and a partial cloverleaf interchange with Cedar Lane. East of Cedar Lane, a spur of the Commonwealth Railway splits to the north to serve the Port of Virginia's Virginia International Gateway terminals while the main line exits the median and begins to parallel the south side of the freeway. Truck access to the terminal is provided by a diamond interchange with Virginia International Gateway Boulevard. Within the West Norfolk neighborhood, SR 164 crosses the railroad and has a partial cloverleaf interchange with West Norfolk Road.

The state highway crosses the Western Branch Elizabeth River on the West Norfolk Bridge, which passes through an S-curve as it crosses the channel of the river then parallels the shore of the residential Port Norfolk neighborhood. SR 164 expands to six lanes at the south end of the river crossing part of the bridge. East of the bridge, the freeway enters the actual Port Norfolk, which is accessed via ramps with Railroad Avenue within the Pinners Point Interchange where US 58 is exiting the Midtown Tunnel.

After the interchange, SR 164 East and US 58 west both continue south as the Martin Luther King Jr. Freeway, connecting to London Boulevard in a full interchange, where it loses its US 58 concurrency. It then continues through a partial interchange at High Street before the ending with a full interchange at I-264/US 460 Alternate.

== History ==
In 1968, Congress passed the Federal-Aid Highway Act of 1968, which expanded the Interstate Highway System by 1,500 miles (2,400 km). The Commonwealth Transportation Board resolved in its August 1968 meeting to apply for five new stretches of Interstate: the future I-195 and I-664 plus an expansion of the Berkley Bridge on I-264 were submitted to the American Association of State Highway and Transportation Officials (AASHTO) and approved, while two other segments were instead built as SR 164 and SR 288. Despite its numbering, AASHTO has no record of Virginia ever making a formal application to add SR 164 to the Interstate system from 1968 through the 1978 opening of the Elizabeth River bridge. The still-unbuilt road was first referred to as SR 164 in 1971.

== Exit list ==
All exits are unnumbered.

County	Location	mi	km	Destinations	Notes
City of Suffolk		0.00	0.00	US 17 (Bridge Road) – James River Bridge	Western terminus
City of Suffolk		0.84	1.35	I-664 – Newport News, Hampton, Chesapeake	Exit 9 (I-664); no access from SR 164 east to I-664 south
City of Suffolk		1.48	2.38	SR 135 (College Drive)	Westbound exit and eastbound entrance
City of Portsmouth		2.38	3.83	Towne Point Road – Churchland	
City of Portsmouth		3.73	6.00	Cedar Lane	
City of Portsmouth		4.50	7.24	Virginia International Gateway Boulevard	
City of Portsmouth		5.46	8.79	West Norfolk Road	
City of Portsmouth				West Norfolk Bridge over Elizabeth River Western Branch	
City of Portsmouth		7.27	11.70	US 58 – Tunnel, Norfolk, Downtown Portsmouth, Port Norfolk	Western terminus of concurrency with US 58; last eastbound exit before tunnel/toll.
City of Portsmouth				Port Norfolk	
City of Portsmouth				US 58 west (London Boulevard)	Eastern terminus of concurrency with US 58; eastbound (southbound) exit and westbound (north) entrance. No access from SR 164 westbound
City of Portsmouth				SR 141 south (London Boulevard) – Downtown Portsmouth	Eastbound (south) exit and westbound(north) entrance. No access from SR 164 westbound
City of Portsmouth				High Street to US 17	Westbound (north) exit and eastbound (south) entrance ramps
City of Portsmouth				I-264 / US 460 Alt. – Norfolk, Suffolk	Eastern terminus
1.000 mi = 1.609 km; 1.000 km = 0.621 mi: Concurrency terminus; Proposed; Incomplete access
