= Elizabeth River Crossings =

Transportation company in Virginia, US

Elizabeth River Crossings OpCo, LLC
- Company type: Limited Liability Company; Subsidiary
- Industry: Transportation, Infrastructure, Construction
- Headquarters: Portsmouth, Virginia
- Areas served: Norfolk; Portsmouth
- Key people: Doug Wilson (Chief Executive Officer)
- Services: Maintenance, repair and operations of the Downtown and Midtown Tunnels, and the MLK Freeway
- Number of employees: 200+
- Parent: Abertis; John Hancock Financial
- Website: driveert.com

Elizabeth River Crossings (ERC), officially known as Elizabeth River Crossings OpCo, LLC, is a limited liability company whose sole purpose is to finance, deliver, operate and maintain the Elizabeth River Tunnels Project in the South Hampton Roads region of Virginia. The project comprised the development, design, construction, finance and operation of a new two-lane tunnel adjacent to the existing Midtown Tunnel under the Elizabeth River, maintenance and safety improvements to the existing Midtown and Downtown tunnels, extending the Martin Luther King Freeway from London Boulevard to Interstate 264, and interchange modifications at Brambleton Avenue and Hampton Boulevard.

The project is located between the cities of Portsmouth and Norfolk in Hampton Roads. Under a comprehensive agreement, the Virginia Department of Transportation (VDOT) will maintain ownership of the infrastructure and oversee ERC's activities. ERC financed and built the facilities, and will operate and maintain them for a 58-year concession period.

== Company background ==
In 2012, Elizabeth River Crossings OpCo was established by Skanska and the Macquarie Group to provide a proposal to the Commonwealth of Virginia's solicitation for bids to upgrade and build out the tunnels that cross the Elizabeth River. Skanska provided the company with construction and development expertise, while Macquarie Group provided private equity and funding for the project. Additional companies that were interested in the project included Kiewit Construction, Weeks Marine, and Skanska's US engineering division, Skanska USA Civil Southeast, all of which were participants in the actual construction and rehabilitation of the tunnels.

Shortly after their proposal was accepted by the VDOT, the original Elizabeth River Crossings, LLC, was divided into two distinct companies: Elizabeth River Crossings HoldCo, which is the 50/50 venture that leverages the capital investments and equity between Skanska and Macquarie, and Elizabeth River Crossings OpCo, which is the operating and management company for the venture, and the company that holds the rights of the Comprehensive Agreement executed by the state.

In November 2020, Elizabeth River Crossings was sold by Skanska and the Macquarie Group to Abertis and John Hancock Financial.

== Elizabeth River Tunnels Project ==
The Elizabeth River Tunnels Project is a series of transportation-related projects that included the rehabilitation of the Downtown and existing Midtown tunnels, the construction of the new parallel Midtown Tunnel, and the extension of the MLK Freeway/U.S. 58 to I-264. The project was administered by Elizabeth River Crossings (ERC) along with VDOT as part of a 58-year public-private partnership (P3) concession that cost approximately $2.1 billion to complete. The projects are designed to significantly reduce or eliminate congestion along the surface streets and other arterial roads of in the immediate area.

After the review process, which was required under the Public-Private Transportation Act (PPTA), then-Governor Bob McDonnell and VDOT executed the Comprehensive Agreement with ERC on December 5, 2011. Under the agreement, VDOT retains ownership and oversight of the tunnels, while ERC finances, builds, operates and maintains the facilities for a 58-year concession period. Funding is collected from tolls, private equity, contributions from the Commonwealth and a low-interest Federal Highway Administration loan. ERC is responsible for paying back all debt on the project, as well as assuming the entire risk of a decrease in toll revenue if traffic counts do not meet projections. However, if traffic exceeds projections and increases revenue, VDOT will receive a portion of the excess revenue, after all other costs and debt service has been paid for the period.

The deal reached financial close on April 13, 2012. The cost of the project, at financial close was $2.1 billion. ERC received $300 million from VDOT, $663.75 million from the Virginia Small Business Financing Authority and $422 million from the U.S. Department of Transportation, all of which went to pay down the toll rate. The 58-year concession period will end on April 13, 2070.

== Controversies ==
=== Westbound weekend tunnel closures ===
As part of the rehabilitation work on the westbound Downtown Tunnel (Norfolk to Portsmouth), full weekend closures were needed of the tunnel for approximately 25 consecutive weekends. These tunnel closures would begin at 8pm on Friday and finish at 5am on the following Monday morning. Traffic would be primarily detoured to the High Rise Bridge utilizing I-464. ERC stated that most of the work either required overhead work (such as installing the fireproofing on the ceiling), or work that would cross the centerline, such that a one-lane closure was not feasible. After allowing closures to occur for several weekends, Portsmouth City Council asked VDOT and ERC to take a look at the plan and explore the idea of turning the eastbound tunnel into a two-way tunnel during the weekend closure. VDOT and ERC had ruled out bi-directional traffic in the eastbound tunnel prior to instituting the weekend closure as too dangerous, stating "that maintaining two lanes of eastbound traffic in the eastbound Downtown Tunnel while directing westbound traffic towards one of the four alternative routes (with the I-64 High Rise Bridge as the primary detour) is the best course of action, both for the Project and the traveling public." However, as public outcry from Portsmouth residents continued, ERC eventually halted full weekend closures, instead converting to full nightly closures beginning at 8pm each night, and running until 5am the next morning. Eastbound tunnel closures, which began in July 2014, were not impacted.

=== Toll processing delays ===
In early 2014, ERC experienced toll processing delays as the result of "software changes and upgrades". This backlog led to the processing of toll charges well after they were incurred, with some reports of charges being processed and billed up to six months later, per some reports. Gov. McAuliffe said in a press conference a few months after the issues were discovered that he understands many users of the Downtown and Midtown tunnel feel the billing issues with ERC are "outrageous" and told ERC to "Get your act together and fix it. You're being paid, do your job right." A September report in The Virginian-Pilot revealed that the problem was still ongoing, and that in July, ERC officials asked VDOT to waive the 60-day processing limit it had imposed on collecting tolls via the E-ZPass system. David Caudill, the VDOT Tolling Administrator, denied the request, and stated in a letter to ERC CEO Greg Woodsmall that he was "greatly concerned with ERC's continued problems with properly managing toll transactions" and that it "reflects poorly on [ERC] and fosters continuing mistrust of the reliability of [their] operations," referring to a backlog of some nearly 350,000 transactions which stemmed from their earlier system glitches, problems which included sensors mistakenly reading cars as having a third axle (triggering a higher toll) and delays in posting tolls to E-ZPass accounts.

After hearing about the issues, Virginia Transportation Secretary Aubrey Lane lambasted ERC for the delays and the plans and attempts to continue collecting the tolls, stating, "This has been going on for eight months, and I'm not convinced they got it fixed yet." In a September 19 letter to ERC, Skanska, and Macquarie officers, he demanded that the company formulate a "formal plan to address the deficiencies" in processing the transactions by October 1, or lose the support of VDOT in enforcing any non-EZ Pass related toll collection. ERC OpCo CEO Woodsmall and ERC HoldCo Chairman Karl Kuchel responded back to the Secretary in a joint letter stating:

- The first invoice for transactions will be sent out within 60 days of the transaction beginning October 1, 2014,
- Any transaction older than 60 days as of that date would be waived, and that
- Any transaction that was greater than 60 days would be not be pursued.

=== Toll processing improvements ===
In September 2014, ERC released a Toll System Improvement Plan that listed several other steps to mitigate the issues, including utilizing a 10 day/10 trip/$20 rule to trigger invoices for non-EZPass customers. An invoice for a Pay by Plate customer would not be generated until 10 days have elapsed, 10 trips have been made or $20 in tolls have been incurred since the first toll on the invoice period. E-ZPass transactions were not affected—they continued to be added and processed nightly by the software. By years end, ERC cleared up all issues and backlogs, and issued $500,000 in refunds to customers who paid for tolls that were in excess of 60 days.

In June 2017, ERC announced changes to the way tunnel users will receive toll bills, and a major restructuring and reduction of late fees for unpaid tolls, effective immediately. A 30-day billing cycle was implemented, ending the cycle of sending multiple, sometimes confusing invoices every month to customers. Users of the tunnels would now get a single monthly statement that includes all trips in a 30-day period and more closely resembles how customers receive statements for other routine bills like credit cards, cable service and utilities. In addition, late fees were dramatically reduced. Now, for unpaid tolls over 30 days old, a $25 late fee is added to each unpaid statement. The significant change was that the lower late fee only applies to the statement, and not to individual transactions on the statement.

In September 2017, on a continued path to improve customer experience, ERC issued a new billing statement for Pay by Plate customers. Improvements of the new statement include:

- An image of the customer's license plate, the amount due, the date the statement was issued, and the date payment is due at the top of the new statement.
- A detailed summary for the current billing period—including the date, time and location of each tolling transaction—and all other account activity including payments and past-due amounts.
- Amount that Pay by Plate customers could save by switching to E-ZPass. Currently, during peak hours, unregistered Pay by Plate customers pay $5.25 per trip, and E-ZPass customers pay $1.95 per trip; a savings of $3.30.
