= South Hampton Roads =

Region in Southeast Virginia

South Hampton Roads, called "the Southside" by locals, is a region located in the extreme southeastern portion of Virginia's Tidewater region in the United States with a total population of 1,177,742 (Note: Counting only the Virginia portion) as of 2020. It is part of the Virginia Beach-Norfolk-Newport News, VA-NC MSA (Metropolitan Statistical Area), which itself has a population of 1,780,059 as of 2020.

South Hampton Roads

Hampton Roads is the common name for the metropolitan area that surrounds the body of water of the same name. The land portion of Hampton Roads has been historically divided into two regions, South Hampton Roads on the south side and the Virginia Peninsula on the north side.

As of the 2020 census, the Hampton Roads MSA is the ninth largest metropolitan area by size in the southeastern United States, and is the second-largest (after the Charlotte metro area) between Washington, D.C., and Atlanta, Georgia.

== U.S. military installations ==
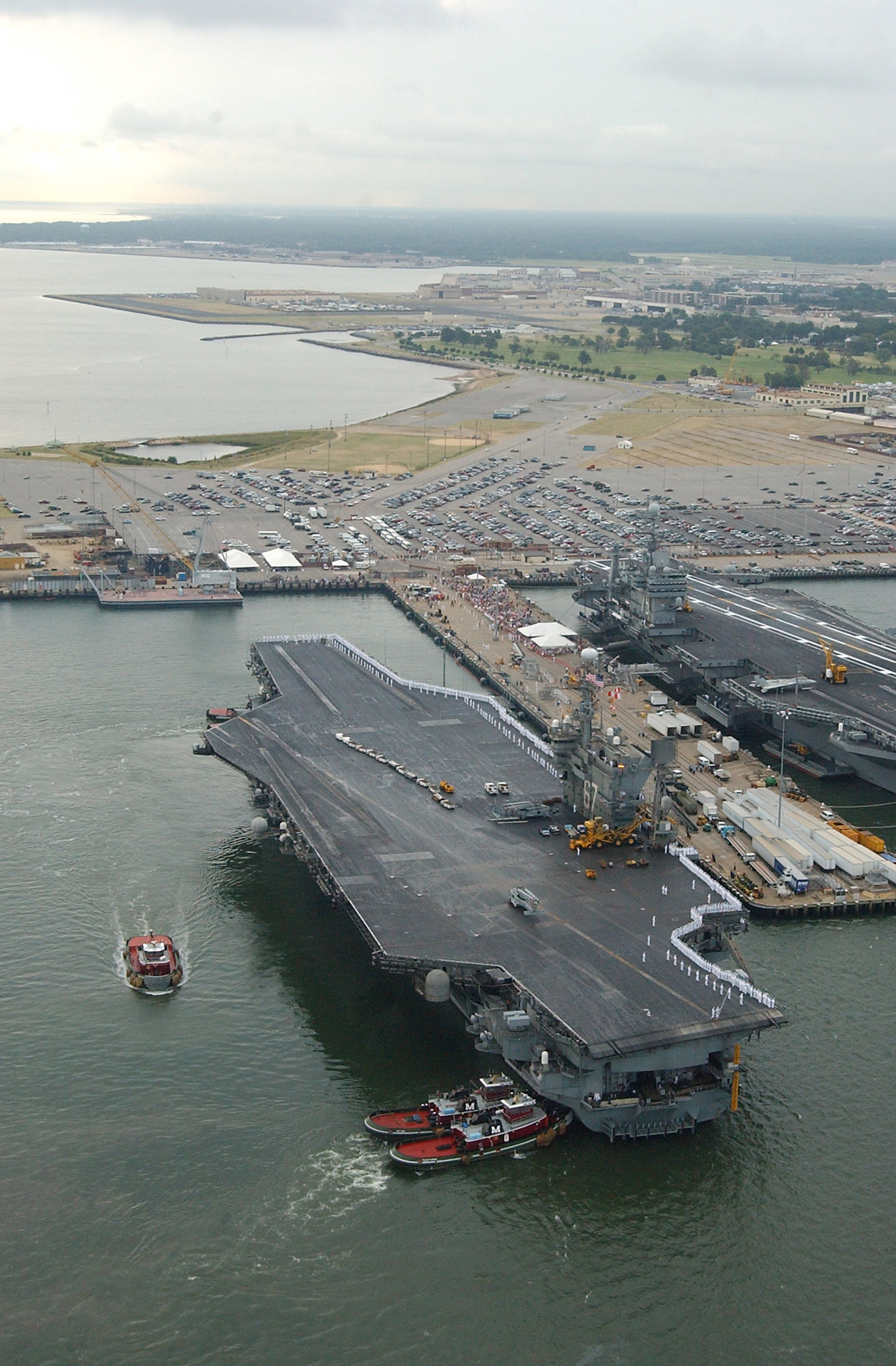
USS John F. Kennedy (CV-67) arriving at Naval Station Norfolk

South Hampton Roads is home to several United States military bases.

=== City of Portsmouth ===
Norfolk Naval Shipyard is located in Portsmouth, as are the Naval Medical Center, Portsmouth, two historic and important facilities, as well as several smaller facilities. The shipyard was founded as the Gosport Shipyard on November 1, 1767, and has the country's first dry dock. The name was changed after the American Civil War. (Although it is located in Portsmouth, the name Norfolk was chosen to avoid confusion with another U.S. Navy shipyard at Portsmouth, New Hampshire which is about 50 miles (80 km) north of Boston, Massachusetts, at the southernmost tip of Maine.)

=== City of Norfolk ===
Across the Elizabeth River, at Sewell's Point near the mouth of Hampton Roads is the Norfolk Navy Base, the central hub of the United States Navy's Atlantic Fleet. The base was founded in 1917, and is now the largest naval facility in the world.

=== City of Virginia Beach ===
Virginia Beach is home to the U.S. Navy's Naval Air Station Oceana (NAS Oceana) and Naval Amphibious Base Little Creek (NAB Little Creek). NAS Oceana is the largest employer in Virginia Beach, and both bases there, like the Norfolk Navy Base, are considered to be the largest of their respective kinds in the world. Furthermore, adjacent to Oceana is NAVSEA Dam Neck. Virginia Beach is also the home of Joint Expeditionary Base East, operated by the United States Navy, which is located at Cape Henry.

=== City of Chesapeake ===
St. Julien's Creek Annex is a U.S. Navy facility in Chesapeake on the Southern Branch Elizabeth River. It began operations in 1849 and occupies approximately 490 acres (200 ha), including 407 acres (165 ha) of land, 14 acres (5.7 ha) of marsh, and 69 acres (28 ha) of surface water. It is currently considered part of the Norfolk Navy Base.

Chesapeake is also home to U.S. Naval Auxiliary Landing Field Fentress, an auxiliary landing facility for NAS Oceana.

The decision to call the region "Hampton Roads" was a political one. The area was referred to as "Tidewater" for many years by the local residents. The local baseball team was called the Tidewater Tides for years but is now called the Norfolk Tides. When they first came to Tidewater, they adopted the local name to draw more fans.

== Local government ==
In Colonial times, and even in the first 150 years of the United States, much like Virginia as a whole, South Hampton Roads was in an almost constant state of change in terms of local government, largely due to growth, as counties were divided and towns were formed as the population grew. Some towns grew to become cities. Under the state constitutional changes in 1871, extant and future cities in Virginia became independent cities of the counties they had formerly been located within.

However, in the second half of the 20th century, an unprecedented wave of city-county-town local government consolidations took place in South Hampton Roads and on the Virginia Peninsula. Nowhere else in Virginia have rural areas and more dense cities been combined in such a manner as these two areas. The changes resulted in the area having Virginia's cities with the largest land areas and the most farming, even over 30 years after the consolidations in some instances.

=== Current cities, counties and towns ===
The South Hampton Roads region includes five independent cities, three counties, and three incorporated towns with a total population of 1,191,937 people. There were also a number of political subdivisions which are now extinct, primarily due to growth and consolidation of local government (see section below).

=== Independent cities ===
- Chesapeake (formerly Norfolk County)
- Norfolk
- Portsmouth
- Suffolk (formerly Nansemond County)
- Virginia Beach (formerly Princess Anne County)

=== Counties ===
- Currituck County, NC
- Gates County, NC
- Isle of Wight County

=== Incorporated towns ===
- Gatesville, NC
- Smithfield
- Windsor

=== Extinct political subdivisions ===
Exclusive of towns which became cities and still have the same name, no less than 2 shires, 6 counties, 1 town, and 2 entire cities no longer exist in the South Hampton Roads area. For search of genealogical, land, and other historical records, it may be necessary to find these old names.

The following is a listing of these 11 extinct shire, counties, towns, and cities, with the approximate dates they existed:

- Elizabeth River Shire (1634–1636) and Elizabeth City County (1636–1952)
- Warrosquyoake Shire (1634–1637)
- New Norfolk County (1636–1637)
- Upper Norfolk County (1637–1646)
- Lower Norfolk County (1637–1691)
- Nansemond County (1646–1972)
- Norfolk County (1691–1963)
- Princess Anne County (1691–1963)
- Town of Berkley (unknown-1906)
- South Norfolk (1919–1963)
- City of Nansemond (1972–1974)

== Highways, bridges, tunnels, bridge-tunnels ==
Generally surrounded by water, the South Hampton Roads region is accessed from the north by a network of highways, bridges, tunnels and bridge-tunnels across the James and Elizabeth Rivers, the harbor of Hampton Roads and the Chesapeake Bay. The area is bordered on the east by the Atlantic Ocean, on the south by the State of North Carolina, and on the west by several counties which are considered to be in the Southside Virginia region.

=== Major bridges, tunnels, and bridge-tunnels ===
- Hampton Roads Bridge-Tunnel
- Monitor-Merrimac Memorial Bridge-Tunnel
- James River Bridge
- Chesapeake Bay Bridge-Tunnel
- Berkley Bridge
- Downtown Tunnel
- Midtown Tunnel
- Gilmerton Bridge
- High Rise Bridge
- Jordan Bridge
- Steel Bridge

=== Interstate highways and other freeways ===
- Interstate 64
- Interstate 264
- Interstate 464
- Interstate 564
- Interstate 664
- Hampton Roads Beltway
- Virginia Beach Expressway
- Chesapeake Expressway

=== U.S. Highways and major state highways ===
- U.S. Route 13
- U.S. Route 17
- U.S. Route 58
- U.S. Route 60
- U.S. Route 258
- U.S. Route 460
- State Route 10
- State Route 31
- State Route 32
- State Route 143
- State Route 164
- State Route 168
- State Route 337

== See also ==
- Battle of Hampton Roads
- Jamestown Exposition
- Sewell's Point
- Willoughby Spit
- Ocean View
- Lambert's Point
- Bower's Hill
- Craney Island
- Military Highway
