= Elizabeth River Tunnel =

Elizabeth River Tunnel may refer to:

- Downtown Tunnel in Hampton Roads, Virginia, carrying I-264; opened 1952
- Midtown Tunnel (Virginia) in Hampton Roads, Virginia, carrying US-58; opened 1962
