= Hampton Roads Transportation Accountability Commission =

- Predecessor: Hampton Roads Transportation Authority
- Formation: June 14, 2014
- Type: Governmental organization
- Purpose: finance and funding of transportation projects in the Hampton Roads region.
- Headquarters: Chesapeake, Virginia
- Members: Chief elected officers of fourteen local jurisdictions; Five local legislators from the General Assembly; Four Officials from transportation related State Executive agencies (non-voting)
- Chairman: William Sessoms
- Vice Chairman: Michael J. Hipple
- Executive Director: Kevin B. Page
- Affiliations: Hampton Roads Transportation Planning Organization
- Budget: appx. $200 million USD in sales tax and other transportation revenue
- Website: http://hrtac.org/

The Hampton Roads Transportation Accountability Commission (HRTAC) is a political subdivision of the Commonwealth of Virginia in the United States that has the responsibility for funding several major traffic projects in the Hampton Roads area. It was created by the Virginia General Assembly in 2014 to maintain and administer the Hampton Roads Transportation Fund, a trust fund established by the Virginia General Assembly through a 0.7% increase in the state sales and use tax and a 2.1% increase in the fuel tax region-wide. The organization previously existed as the Hampton Roads Transportation Authority (HRTA) but was disbanded in 2008 after the Virginia Supreme Court invalidated its authority to raise and levy taxes.

The organization exists alongside the Hampton Roads Transportation Planning Organization (HRTPO), which is the federally mandated metropolitan planning organization responsible for planning and programming the projects for the region. Although politically independent, the TAC generally consists of the same members of the TPO, with the major exception being that mass transit is not represented on the TAC due to state law prohibiting the use of HRTF funds for mass/public transit purposes.

== History ==
=== Background and formation ===
Since 2004, the Hampton Roads region has been searching for funding to complete major projects such as the addition of a new Midtown Tunnel and the extension of the Martin Luther King Freeway in Portsmouth, the addition of a third harbor crossing between the Southside and the Peninsula, and widening I-64 on both sides of the water, projects that would cost a combined total of $3.8 billion USD. However, the Commission determined that state funding would be insufficient for most of these projects because VDOT determined that "reliance on a regional gas tax [was] not a reasonably foreseeable source of revenue" for the plan.

In 2006, the Hampton Roads Transportation Planning Organization (then called the Hampton Roads Metropolitan Planning Organization) concluded that new tolls could help secure funding for transportation projects that were removed from the 2026 RTP. Based on this study, the MPO added the projects to the regions 2030 RTP, now estimated to cost around $5 billion — if the Virginia General Assembly approved the new tolls and several tax increases.

After receiving the proposal, the General Assembly enacted House Bill 3202 introduced by State Delegate William J. Howell, which allowed the region to enact tolling on the project by creating the Hampton Roads Transportation Authority, as well as authorizing tax increases requested by the MPO to finance the other major projects in the region's plan. The state legislation authorized the HRTA to impose, assess and collect taxes, fees and tolls for projects within the jurisdictional limits of the authority, including the controversial civil remedial fees where drivers who violated traffic laws were charged civil penalties on top of their criminal fines. In total, the regional taxes and fees anticipated to be applied to the HRTA would generate an additional $170 million per year towards critical regional transportation projects, in addition to state monies delegated for projects. Toll revenues would be additional funds available to the HRTA.

With this, HRTA then scheduled regional tax increases to go into effect on April 1, 2008, which included a $10 automobile safety inspection fee, a 5 percent tax on automobile repairs, a grantor's tax of 40 cents for every $100 of assessed value when selling a home, a motor vehicle rental tax of 2 percent, a one-time vehicle registration fee of 1 percent, an $10 increase in the vehicle registration fee in the region, and a 2 percent gas tax for the region.

=== Supreme Court ruling and disbandment ===
Many residents were upset by the General Assembly's choice to delegate its taxing authority.

During the 2008 session of the Virginia General Assembly, there were efforts sponsored by legislators from the area to include improvements to the Hampton Roads Bridge-Tunnel, a major issue for localities on the Virginia Peninsula, where many residents complained that the proposed projects shortchanged their area. Also, Del. Tom Gear sponsored H.B. 829 to abolish the HRTA. None of those measures passed, however.

While the Assembly was still in session, on February 29, 2008, the Virginia Supreme Court ruled in Marshall v. Northern Virginia Transportation Authority that the taxation authority granted to these non-elected bodies violated the Constitution of Virginia and were thus unconstitutional. The Court ruled that the General Assembly could not delegate its taxing powers to an unelected body, stating in its opinion, written by State Justice S. Bernard Goodwyn:

...the General Assembly has failed to adhere to the mandates of accountability and transparency that the Constitution requires when the General Assembly exercises the legislative taxing authority permitted by the Constitution. If payment of the regional taxes and fees is to be required by a general law, it is the prerogative and the function of the General Assembly, as provided by Article IV, Section 1 of the Constitution, to make that decision, in a manner which complies with the requirements of Article IV, Section 11 of the Constitution.

Since the HRTA was also not a directly elected body, the press reported that its funding sources as set forth at that time were also invalidated by the court ruling. The opinion did not, however, find the existence of the HRTA (or the NVTA for that matter) to be unconstitutional, nor did it strike the authority of the regional authorities to impose tolling on the roadways. Nonetheless, since the sole purpose of the HRTA was financial, it was abolished by the General Assembly in 2009.

=== Post-ruling and resurrection ===
The legislature took several years to develop a long-term plan to replace the one that the Virginia Supreme Court deemed unconstitutional. Several projects in the HRTA plan continued to go unfunded while two other plans—the Elizabeth River Tunnels Project and the U.S. Route 460 project (dubbed the "Commonwealth Connector")—went forward as public-private partnerships projects, both of which met serious criticism in how they were negotiated.

Finally, in 2013, the General Assembly passed a new massive transportation funding package, sponsored by Speaker of the House of Delegates William J. Howell that accomplished the same as the HRTA authorizing legislation, with the exception of granting the new authority taxation power. Instead, the General Assembly itself levied the tax increases—a statewide sales and use tax increase to 4.8%, a statewide increase in motor vehicle registration fees by $15, as well as, for the first time since 1986, a change in the statewide gas tax to be 3.5% of the price of a gallon of gas instead of a flat 17.5 cents per gallon. This plan, based on estimates from the Commonwealth Transportation Board, would raise $15.4 billion for statewide projects, including $1.3 billion for the new Hampton Roads Transportation Fund.

The following session, State Delegate Chris Jones of Suffolk and State Senator Frank Wagner of Virginia Beach introduced legislation, HB1253 and SB513, which provided for the creation of the Hampton Roads Transportation Accountability Commission (HRTAC) to manage the Hampton Roads Transportation Fund (HRTF) revenues for the Hampton Roads region. This legislation also moved the responsibility for approval and prioritization of the projects from the HRTPO to the HRTAC. The General Assembly adopted the bill on March 8, 2014, and the bill was signed by Governor Terry McAuliffe on April 3. HRTAC then became effective on July 1, 2014.

== Jurisdiction and composition ==
The HRTA area includes the entire territory encompassed by all 12 localities within the states Planning District 23, and each are represented on its governing board by their chief elected official or other designee from the localities governing council. Also, there are five positions legislators from the Virginia General Assembly—two senators and three State Delegates who will represent the intent of the legislature on the commission. Legislators are appointed by their respective body's leadership and must represent one or more of the jurisdictions of the Commission. There are also four state level executives who are appointed ex officio as non-voting member to the board by virtue of their positions. All individuals hold their position on the commission for the duration they hold their elected (or appointed) office.

Name	Jurisdiction/Agency Represented
Mayor Richard W. West	City of Chesapeake
Mayor Frank Rabil	City of Franklin
Mayor Donnie Tuck	City of Hampton
County Supervisor Joel Acree	Isle of Wight County
County Supervisor Michael J. Hipple Commission Chairman	James City County
Mayor McKinley Price	City of Newport News
Mayor Kenneth C. Alexander	City of Norfolk
Mayor W. Eugene Hunt Jr.	City of Poquoson
Mayor John Rowe	City of Portsmouth
County Supervisor Barry T. Porter	Southampton County
Mayor Linda T. Johnson Commission Vice-Chair	City of Suffolk
Mayor Bobby Dyer	City of Virginia Beach
Thomas G. Shepperd	York County, Virginia
Paul Freiling	City of Williamsburg
State Del. Christopher P. Stolle (R - 83rd - Norfolk/VA Beach)	Delegate of the Virginia General Assembly
State Del. Chris Jones (R - 76th - Chesapeake/Suffolk)	Delegate of the Virginia General Assembly
State Del. David E. Yancey (R - 94th - Newport News)	Delegate of the Virginia General Assembly
State Sen. Frank W. Wagner (R - 7th - Norfolk/Virginia Beach)	Senator of the Virginia General Assembly
Vacant	Senator of the Virginia General Assembly
Charles Kilpatrick	Commissioner, Department of Transportation
John F. Malbon	Member, Commonwealth Transportation Board Hampton Roads District
Jennifer Mitchell	Director, Virginia Department of Rail and Public Transit
John F. Reinhart	CEO, Virginia Port Authority

== Projects ==
As of June 2016, the HRTAC currently has four major projects underway:

- The I-64 Widening on the Peninsula was the first project funded by HRTAC. Estimated to cost $144 million, the project will widen I-64 from Newport News all the way to New Kent County, just outside the Richmond Metro area.
- The I-64 Widening Project on the Southside has also been preliminary funded through the engineering phase. Estimated to cost close to $2.3 billion, the project will widen the I-64 corridor to eight lanes between the I-64/I-464 interchange to the Bowers Hill Interchange, as well as both build and replace the current High Rise Bridge with a new, 135 ft fixed span bridge over the Southern Branch of the Elizabeth River.
- The environmental study of the Hampton Roads Third Crossing, that would connect to the I-564 Intermodal Connector and cross the southern portion of the harbor between Naval Station Norfolk and Norfolk International Terminals and connect with I-664 on the west side of Craney Island
- The improvements in to I-64/I-264 interchange, including adding a second exit lane on westbound I-64 and the widening of the ramp from westbound I-64 to eastbound I-264, introducing a new two-lane collector-distributor roadway (C-D road) from I-64 to the Newtown Road interchange, and a new two-lane flyover ramp from westbound I-64 tying into the existing eastbound I-264 C-D road. This project is estimated to cost $157 million.
