= Dominion Boulevard Steel Bridge =

Steel Bridge
- Coordinates: +36.73643°N 76.29477°W
- Carries: US 17
- Crosses: Elizabeth River (Virginia)
- Locale: Chesapeake, Virginia
- Official name: Dominion Blvd. Steel Bridge
- Owner: City of Chesapeake
- ID number: 21875

Characteristics
- Design: Bascule bridge
- Total length: 551.9 feet (168.2 m)
- Width: 27.9 feet (8.5 m)
- Longest span: 2 x 228.0 feet (69.5 m)
- Load limit: 84,000 pounds (38 t)
- Clearance below: 11.8 feet (3.6 m)

History
- Opened: 1962
- Closed: December 2014
- Replaced by: Veterans Bridge

Dominion Boulevard Steel Bridge (known locally as simply the Steel Bridge) was a double-leaf bascule, two-lane drawbridge which spanned the Southern Branch Elizabeth River in the City of Chesapeake in South Hampton Roads in southeastern Virginia. Built in 1962 and operated by the City of Chesapeake, it carried U.S. Route 17 (US 17) which is Dominion Boulevard (formerly numbered as State Route 104). The corridor frequently acts as a bypass route for congested I-64 High Rise Bridge traffic.

Because of the low water clearance, bridge openings were commonplace for the bridge, with an average of 16 lifts per day. Combined with an average daily traffic count of 33,000, it frequently became a choke point for commuters who lived in the Deep Creek part of the city, with a failing level of service on the entire stretch according to a during a 2006 traffic plan by the HRPTO.

In January 2013, Chesapeake Public Works began construction on a $345 million fixed-bridge replacement project called the Veterans Bridge, which was completed in late 2017. It expanded Dominion Blvd. from two to four lanes from the intersection of Cedar Road & Moses Grady Trail to the interchange of Great Bridge Blvd. The Veterans Bridge is tolled, which started at the rate of $1 in 2017. This project is also a part of the planning for the future Interstate 87 that will connect the Raleigh-Durham Metro area to the Hampton Roads region.

After the first span of the Veterans Bridge opened in December 2014, the Steel Bridge was shut down and demolished.
