= Gilmerton Bridge =

Bridge in Chesapeake, Virginia

- Coordinates: 36°46′31″N 76°17′43″W
- Carries: US 13 / US 460
- Crosses: Southern Branch Elizabeth River
- Locale: Chesapeake, Virginia
- Owner: City of Chesapeake

Location
- Interactive map of Gilmerton Bridge

The Gilmerton Bridge, originally a twin bascule drawbridge, is now a vertical-lift bridge which spans the Southern Branch Elizabeth River in the City of Chesapeake in South Hampton Roads in southeastern Virginia. Completed in 1938, it carries U.S. Route 13 and US 460 and is part of Military Highway (which was completed during World War II in what was then Norfolk County). The Gilmerton Bridge is operated by the City of Chesapeake.

== Replacement project ==
In 2009, a $150 million replacement project began. According to the Virginia Department of Transportation, funds designated for planned work on the nearby Steel Bridge and on Dominion Boulevard (US 17), each also in Chesapeake, are being diverted to the Gilmerton project, which is more urgent. VDOT also has advised that motor vehicle traffic will be reduced to one lane in each direction during the estimated four years the project will take to complete. The project was completed late May 2015 and normal traffic flow resumed May 26, 2015. Prior to this the bridge was closing at 8:00 p.m. Sunday through Thursday.
