= Norfolk Convention and Visitors Bureau =

The Norfolk Convention and Visitors Bureau (DBA VisitNorfolk) is the official tourism promotion agency for the city of Norfolk, Virginia and a travel and visitor resource for information on hotels, packages, attractions, events and things to do. VisitNorfolk is a private 501 (c) (6) organization located in Downtown Norfolk at 232 E. Main Street, Norfolk, Virginia 23510. VisitNorfolk's objective is to generate economic growth for Norfolk by producing high volumes of visitors, tax revenues and travel related jobs. The organization expands the role of travel and tourism in the Norfolk economy via sales, marketing and customer service.

== Background ==
Norfolk, Virginia is located at the core of the Hampton Roads metropolitan area, named for the large natural harbor of the same name located at the mouth of Chesapeake Bay. It is one of nine cities and seven counties that constitute the Hampton Roads metro area, officially known as the Virginia Beach-Norfolk-Newport News, VA-NC MSA. The city is bordered to the west by the Elizabeth River and to the north by the Chesapeake Bay. It also shares land borders with the independent cities of Chesapeake to its south and Virginia Beach to its east. One of the oldest of the cities in Hampton Roads, Norfolk is considered to be the historic, urban, financial, and cultural center of the region.

== Services ==
1. Provide a point of reference and information for visitors to Norfolk linking them to accommodations, transportation, local historic, cultural & recreational sites, events and dining. Tourists, planners and residents may visit both the bureau and visitor center during office hours to receive brochures, maps and other information.

2. Serve as the point of contact for meeting planners.

3. Act as resource for marketing Norfolk as a tourism destination.
