= Virginia State Route 141 =

State highway in Virginia, United States

State Route 141

Route information
- Maintained by VDOT
- Length: 3.25 mi (5.23 km)
- Existed: ca. 1970–present

Major junctions
- South end: US 17 in Portsmouth
- SR 337 in Portsmouth; I-264 / US 460 Alt. in Portsmouth
- North end: US 58 in Portsmouth

Location
- Country: United States
- State: Virginia
- Counties: City of Portsmouth

Highway system
- Virginia Routes; Interstate; US; Primary; Secondary; Byways; History; HOT lanes
← SR 140	→ SR 142

State Route 141 (SR 141) is a primary state highway in the U.S. state of Virginia. The state highway runs 3.25 miles (5.23 km) from U.S. Route 17 (US 17) north to US 58 within the independent city of Portsmouth. SR 141 connects the aforementioned U.S. Highways and Interstate 264 (I-264) with Downtown Portsmouth and the Norfolk Naval Shipyard.

== Route description ==
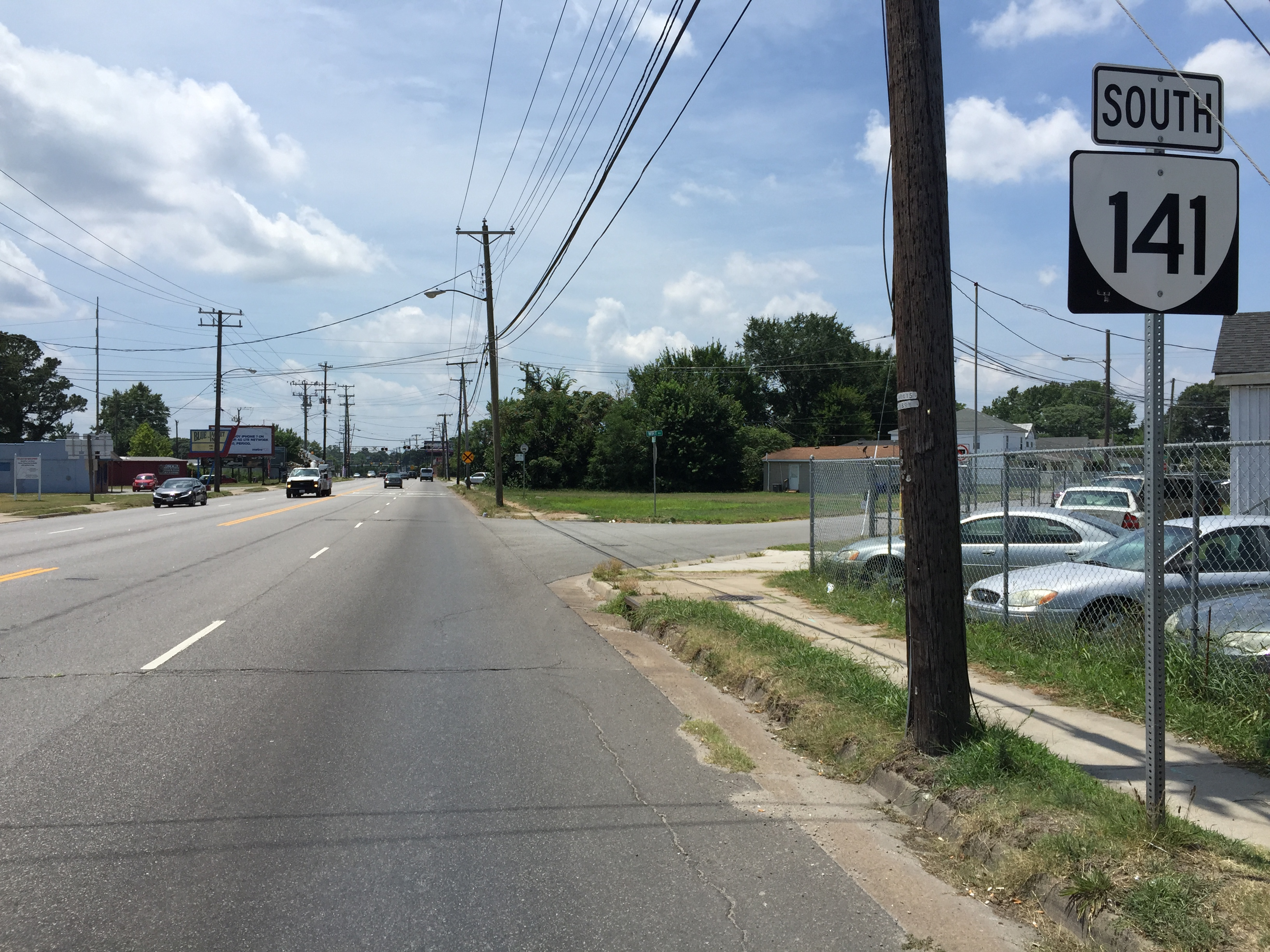
View south along SR 141 (George Washington Highway) near Wirt Avenue in Portsmouth

SR 141 begins at an intersection with US 17, which heads south as George Washington Highway toward Chesapeake and northwest as Frederick Boulevard. The state highway heads northeast as a four-lane undivided continuation of George Washington Highway. SR 141 has a grade crossing of a Norfolk and Portsmouth Belt Line Railroad line and intersects SR 337 (Elm Avenue) before intersecting Portsmouth Blvd next to the Norfolk Naval Shipyard. That intersection features a jughandle for traffic from southbound SR 141 to the shipyard. SR 141 continues north as Effingham Street, a four-lane divided highway that passes through a residential area. The state highway has an interchange with I-264 just west of the Downtown Tunnel at the southwest corner of downtown Portsmouth. SR 141 continues north to London Street, where the state highway turns west onto its six-lane divided continuation, London Boulevard. The state highway reaches its northern terminus at its partial cloverleaf interchange with the Martin Luther King Jr. Freeway, which has its southern terminus just south of SR 141. US 58 heads north on the freeway and south on the continuation of London Boulevard toward Suffolk.

== Major intersections ==
The entire route is in Portsmouth.

mi	km	Destinations	Notes
0.00	0.00	US 17 (George Washington Highway / Frederick Boulevard)	Southern terminus
0.36	0.58	SR 337 (Elm Avenue)	
0.76	1.22	Shipyard	Jughandle
1.60	2.57	I-264 (US 460 Alt.) / to Frederick Boulevard (US 17) – Suffolk, Downtown Tunnel, Norfolk	Exit 7 (I-264)
3.25	5.23	US 58 to SR 164 / I-664 – Midtown Tunnel, Norfolk	interchange; northern terminus
1.000 mi = 1.609 km; 1.000 km = 0.621 mi
