= Berkley Bridge (Virginia) =

Bridge across Elizabeth River in Norfolk Virginia

I-264 Berkley Bridge
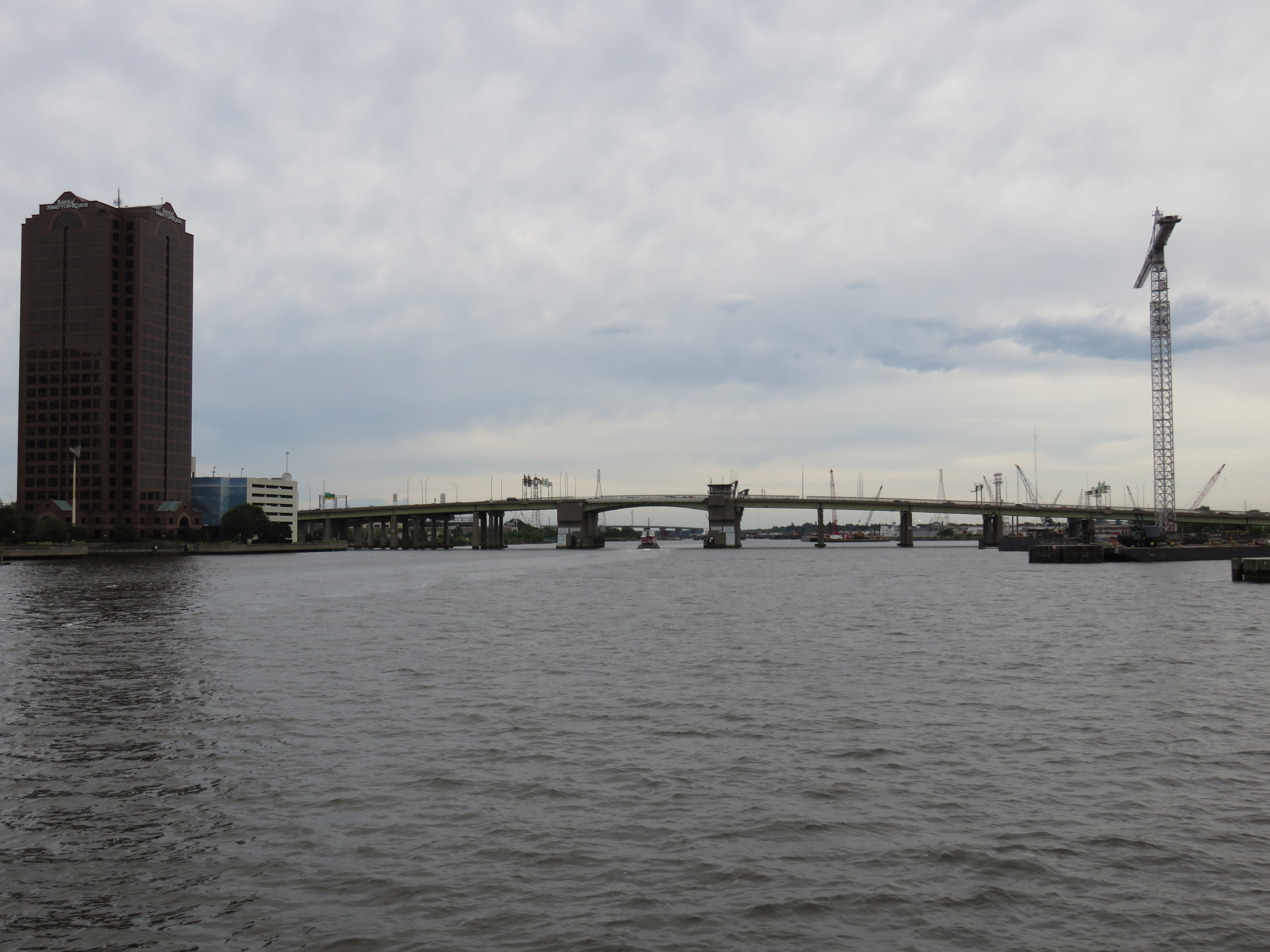
- Berkley Bridge in 2016
- Coordinates: 36.83833°N 76.28667°W
- Carries: eight lanes of I-264 / US 460 Alt. / SR 337 traffic, pedestrians
- Crosses: Eastern Branch of the Elizabeth River
- Locale: Norfolk, Virginia
- Official name: Berkley Bridge
- Owner: Virginia Department of Transportation
- Maintained by: Virginia Department of Transportation
- ID number: 20947 (WB); 20962 (EB)

Characteristics
- Design: twin-leaf bascule bridge
- Material: Steel
- Total length: 2,124.1 feet (647.4 m)
- Width: 54.1 feet (16.5 m)
- Water depth: 45 feet (14 m)
- Traversable?: yes as restricted by 33 C.F.R. 117.1007
- Longest span: 2 x 230.0 feet (70.1 m)
- No. of spans: 2
- Clearance below: 48 feet (15 m)

History
- Opened: 1952
- Rebuilt: 1991

Location
- Interactive map of I-264 Berkley Bridge

References
- "Hampton Roads Tunnels and Bridges". Virginia Department of Transportation. "Berkley Bridge". Bridgehunter.com. "Chart of Norfolk Harbor and Elizabeth River". Office of Coast Survey. NOAA.

The Berkley Bridge is a double-leaf bascule bridge that crosses the Eastern Branch of the Elizabeth River in Norfolk, Virginia, United States. It carries Interstate 264 (I-264), U.S. Route 460 Alternate (US 460 Alt.), and State Route 337 (SR 337) across the river, connecting the Berkley neighborhood south of the river with downtown Norfolk to the north. The toll-free facility is one of only a small number of movable bridges on the Interstate Highway System, and is the first of two in the Hampton Roads region, predating the High Rise Bridge. It is named for the former Town of Berkley that is now a part of the City of Norfolk.

== History ==
There have been several incarnations of a Berkley Bridge. An earlier Berkley Bridge was built before 1922, east of the present one, along Main Street. A replacement for that span, in the present location, was completed in 1952 as part of the original Norfolk–Portsmouth Bridge-Tunnel project between the city of Portsmouth and Norfolk. The project was funded with toll revenue bonds. When the bonds were fully repaid, the tolls were removed.

In 1991, during an expansion of I-264, the Downtown Tunnel was expanded to four lanes and a parallel Berkley Bridge was built, bringing the total Berkley Bridge capacity to eight lanes. This construction included a new interchange for Interstate 464 which connects the Berkley area with Interstate 64 in the independent city of Chesapeake.

== Description ==
=== I-264 Eastbound ===
After exiting the Downtown Tunnel, and while crossing the bridge, all traffic for I-264 East has to immediately merge right with the two lanes of bridge on-ramp traffic from I-464 traffic in order to continue on I-264 E, while SR 337 Alternate(Waterside Drive) and St. Paul Boulevard traffic has to merge left for the left exit. Traffic for westbound US 460 Alt./SR 337 (Tidewater Drive) will use the left of the I-264 lanes to exit left immediately after the aforementioned split.

=== I-264 Westbound ===
On the Berkley side, I-264 and US 460 Alternate turn west through the Downtown Tunnel (under the Southern Branch of the river), while Interstate 464 begins, heading south, and SR 337 uses I-464 to reach surface streets.

=== Pedestrian Traffic ===
There is a pedestrian walkway on the eastern side of the bridge. It is suitable for walking or bicycling and offers a view of Downtown Norfolk and the Elizabeth River. It is separated from the roadway and is fenced in.

In 2014, news outlets in Hampton Roads showed YouTube video from bicyclist Kelley Howell showing where she was struck by a bridge tender's personally owned vehicle that, according to VDOT was traveling legally on the walkway en route to shift change. The cyclist was not seriously injured, however after the investigation, VDOT no longer allows the bridge tenders to drive on the walkway for their shift change, and in addition, will require the use of spotters when VDOT vehicles are required to drive on the walkway.
