= High Rise Bridge =

Drawbridge in Chesapeake, Virginia

- Coordinates: 36.7582°N 76.2977°W
- Carries: I-64 and US 17
- Crosses: Southern Branch Elizabeth River
- Locale: Chesapeake

History
- Construction start: 1969
- Opened: 1972

Statistics
- Daily traffic: 73,000

Location
- Interactive map of High Rise Bridge

The High Rise Bridge, also known as the G.A. Treakle Memorial Bridge, is a four-lane, bascule drawbridge that Interstate 64 (I-64) and US 17 uses to cross the Southern Branch of the Elizabeth River. The twin spans of concrete and steel were completed in 1972, and are operated by VDOT. Currently, the High Rise Bridge is the only highway-grade toll-free crossing of the Southern Branch Elizabeth River, since the Downtown and Midtown Tunnel began tolling in 2014. Other non-interstate alternate routes include the Gilmerton Bridge on U.S. Route 13 (US 13; Military Highway), as well as the tolled Jordan Bridge in Portsmouth.

Because of the high impact a bridge opening has on traffic, the bridge only opens on a 24-hour advanced notice unless the scheduled lift time is during the bridge's restricted hours of 6–9 am and 3–6 pm, when a three-day notice is required. The current reconstruction project intends to produce a fixed bridge with 100 feet (30 m) clearance, expected to significantly reduce traffic delays associated with bridge lifts.

== History ==
On Wednesday November 10, 2010 after the 2:30 opening the bridge was stuck in the up position causing widespread traffic delays. It was later attributed to an electrical outage during a lift at 2:30 p.m.. That failure caused a malfunction in the bridge's lift mechanism which caused the bridge to not close completely. Engineers had to manually lower the span back together, and reopened the bridge some three and a half hours later, at 6:00 pm.

In 2016, the Commonwealth Transportation Board approved a $2.3 billion project that would eventually widen the corridor of I-64 that includes the bridge to eight lanes, and would replace the drawbridge with a 100 feet (30 m) fixed span bridge, initially planned for 135 feet (41 m), as part of the I-64 Southside Widening Project. As of October 2016, the plan is in Phase I, which would improve the corridor six lanes and build the new four lane Outer Loop bridge, which carries I-64 towards Chesapeake/Norfolk. The project is currently in Design–build status, and contract phase of 2017 has been completed and completion done in July 2022.
