= Lee County Airport (Virginia) =

- IATA: none; ICAO: none; FAA LID: 0VG

Summary
- Airport type: Public
- Owner: Lee County, Virginia
- Serves: Jonesville, Virginia
- Elevation AMSL: 1,411 ft / 430 m
- Coordinates: 36°39′15″N 083°13′04″W

Map
- Location of airport in Virginia

Runways
Direction	Length		Surface
Direction	ft	m	Surface
7/25	5,000	1,524	Asphalt

Statistics (2012)
- Aircraft operations: 5,896
- Based aircraft: 8
- Source: Federal Aviation Administration

Lee County Airport (FAA LID: 0VG) is a public use airport in Lee County, Virginia, United States. It is owned by Lee County and located five nautical miles (6 mi, 9 km) southwest of the central business district of Jonesville, Virginia. This airport is included in the National Plan of Integrated Airport Systems for 2011–2015, which categorized it as a general aviation facility.

== Facilities and aircraft ==
Lee County Airport covers an area of 328 acres (133 ha) at an elevation of 1,411 feet (430 m) above mean sea level. It has one runway designated 7/25 with an asphalt surface measuring 5,000 by 75 feet (1,524 x 23 m).

For the 12-month period ending May 31, 2012, the airport had 5,896 general aviation aircraft operations, an average of 16 per day. At that time there were 8 aircraft based at this airport: 75% single-engine, 12.5% jet, and 12.5% helicopter.

== See also ==
- List of airports in Virginia
