= U.S. Route 58 =

Highway in the United States

U.S. Route 58
- US 58 highlighted in red

Route information
- Maintained by TDOT and VDOT
- Length: 508 mi (818 km)
- Existed: 1931–present
- Tourist routes: Virginia Byway

Major junctions
- West end: US 25E at Cumberland Gap, TN
- US 421 from Pennington Gap, VA to Bristol, VA; US 23 from Duffield, VA to Weber City, VA; I-81 from Bristol, VA to Abingdon, VA; I-77 near Hillsville, VA; Future I-785 / US 29 / US 311 in Danville, VA; US 360 from Danville, VA to South Boston, VA; I-85 in South Hill, VA; I-95 in Emporia, VA; US 13 / US 460 from Suffolk, VA to Chesapeake, VA; I-64 / I-264 / I-664 in Chesapeake, VA
- East end: US 60 in Virginia Beach, VA

Location
- Country: United States
- States: Tennessee, Virginia
- Counties: TN: Claiborne; VA: Lee, Scott, Washington, City of Bristol, Grayson, City of Galax, Carroll, Floyd, Patrick, Henry, Pittsylvania, City of Danville, Halifax, Mecklenburg, Brunswick, Greensville, City of Emporia, Southampton, City of Suffolk, City of Chesapeake, City of Portsmouth, City of Norfolk, City of Virginia Beach

Highway system
- United States Numbered Highway System; List; Special; Divided
← US 57	US	→ US 59
← SR 57	TN	→ SR 58
← SR 57	VA	→ SR 59
← SR 382		→ SR 384

U.S. Route 58 (US 58) is an east–west U.S. Highway that runs for 508 miles (818 km) from U.S. Route 25E just northwest of Harrogate, Tennessee, to U.S. Route 60 in Virginia Beach, Virginia. Until 1996, when the Cumberland Gap Tunnel opened, US 58 ran only inside the commonwealth of Virginia (and it now runs only about 1 mile outside of Virginia into Tennessee before terminating). It was then extended southwest along a short piece of former US 25E, which no longer enters Virginia, to end at the new alignment in Tennessee. For most of its alignment, it closely parallels Virginia's southern border with North Carolina.

State Route 383 (SR 383) is overlaid on U.S. Route 58 in Tennessee.

U.S. Route 58 is the longest numbered route in Virginia.

== Route description ==
=== Tennessee ===
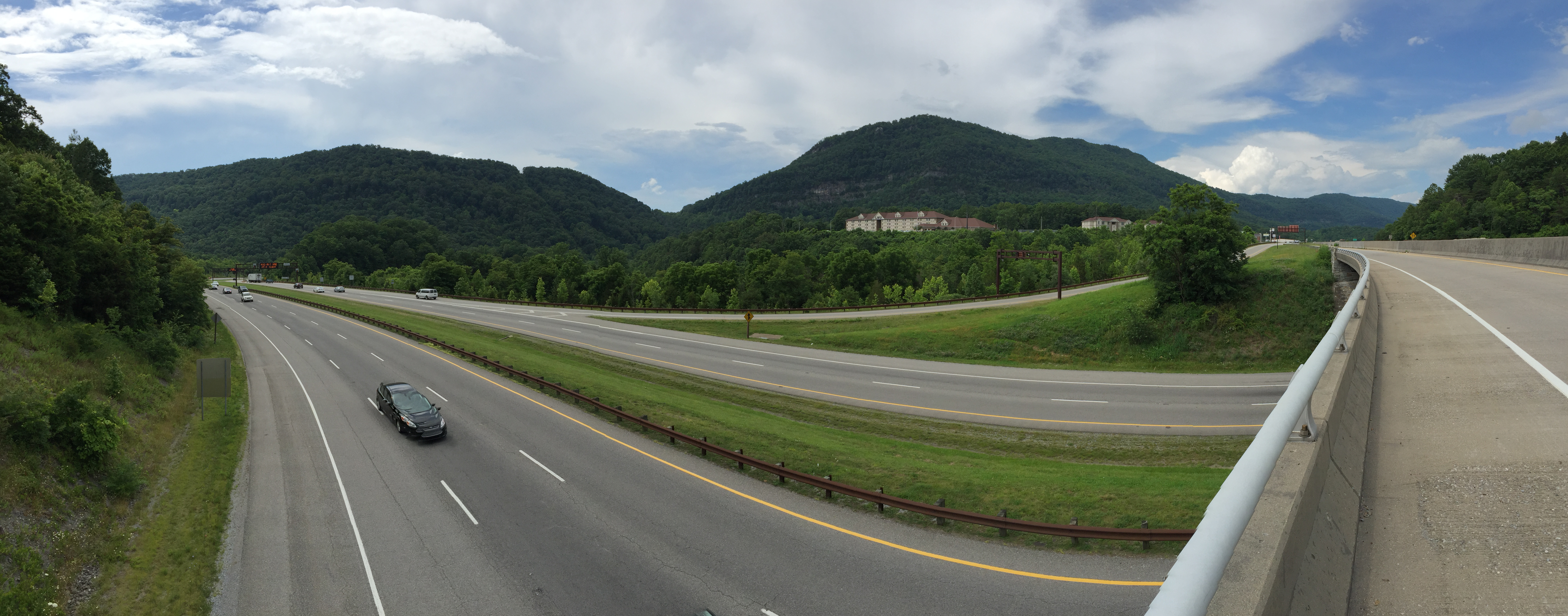
Panorama of the interchange of US 25E and US 58, Cumberland Gap, TN

US 58 begins at a trumpet interchange with US 25E, just south of the Cumberland Gap Tunnel. The interchange is located on the border of the municipalities of Cumberland Gap and Harrogate, within Claiborne County. The route travels northeast as a four lane divided highway, through a small section of Cumberland Gap with a few businesses. US 58 then abruptly leaves Cumberland Gap and enters a small section of a rural area within Harrogate, passing along the southeastern edge of the Cumberland Gap National Historical Park. After intersecting a road leading to the park and the historical area in Cumberland Gap, the route leaves the state of Tennessee and enters the commonwealth of Virginia, after only about a half mile in Tennessee.

US 58 in Tennessee carries the designation State Route 383.

=== Virginia ===
==== Tennessee to Jonesville ====
Upon entering Virginia, US 58 also enters Lee County and becomes Wilderness Road. The divided highway makes a reverse turn heading generally towards the east, in a forested region, before turning east-northeast after to the south of the Wilderness Road entrance to the Cumberland Gap National Historical Park. US 58 crosses over Station Creek, before curving due east through the hamlet of Gibson Station. Past Gibson Station, the highway passes northeast through an area of a rolling hills with homes surrounding either side of the road. It is paralleled by Indian Creek on its southeast side, with the route crossing over its Pendleton Branch, prior to intersecting SR 691 in the village of Wheeler. US 58 continues northeast from Wheeler, before turning due east again while passing along the southern edge of the Wilderness Road State Park. The route crosses Indian Creek twice, before intersecting SR 684 to the southwest of a park and ride lot, and the DeBusk Veterinary Teaching Center of Lincoln Memorial University. The route then dips south through more rural areas of rolling hills, residences, and farmland before turning northeast once more. After passing through some hill cuts with stone sides and crossing over the Roaring Branch of Indian Creek, US 58 reaches the unincorporated town of Ewing. At Ewing, the route reaches its first intersection with a gantry, as its intersection with SR 724 has a blinking yellow light above it. US 58 continues northeast through more rural forests and farmland along the southeastern slope of Poor Valley Ridge, before reaching the unincorporated town of Rose Hill. In Rose Hill, more businesses and houses appear along the edges of the road, and a jersey barrier briefly forms in the median before the road crosses over the White Branch of the Powell River. Beyond the crossing, the median reverts to a grassy surface as US 58 leaves Rose Hill. The route continues to pass more homes, mainly in the traditional style, and businesses, mainly those that are timber shed retailers, before it makes a brief turn to the due east. Here US 58 crosses over Burning Well Road, Hardy Creek, and the railroad line of CSX Transportation (former L&N) leading to the Hagan's Switchback, on a twin-span beam bridge. The route then turns back towards the northeast and crosses the Hugh C. Chance Memorial Bridge. US 58 then makes a curve to the southeast through hilly wooded areas, before crossing over Dry Creek and meeting State Routes 880 and 758 at an intersection. The latter road provides access to the Lee County Airport. Past the intersection, US 58 briefly gains an eastbound climbing lane, before narrowing back to two lanes in each direction. The route continues east before heading northeast through wooded residential areas. Soon US 58 narrows to a two-lane rural road heading east through hilly residential zones entering the town limits of Jonesville, the county seat of Lee County.

==== Jonesville to Virginia Beach ====
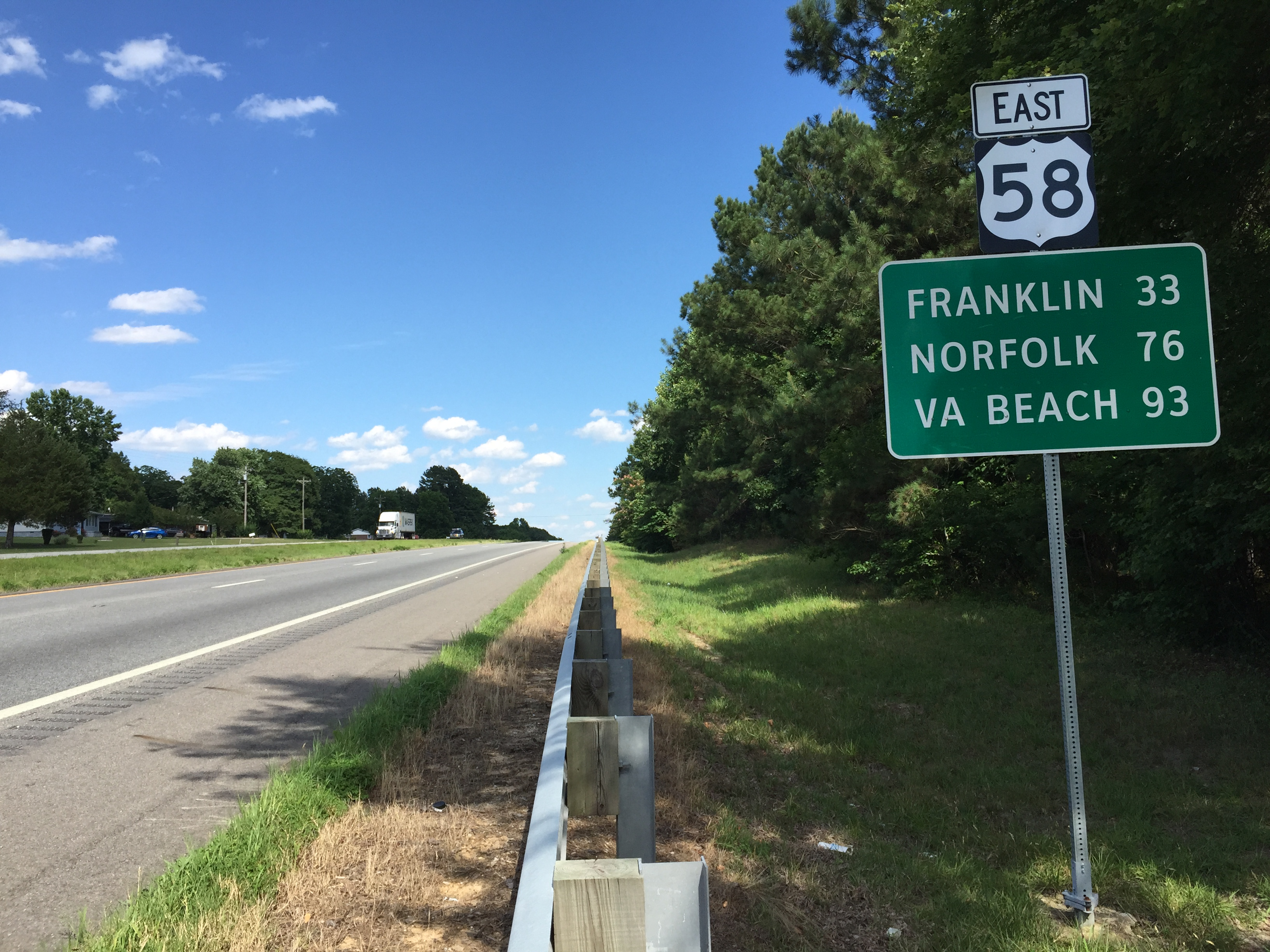
View east along US 58 at SR 623 just east of Emporia, Virginia

East of Jonesville, US 58 intersects US 421, and the two routes stay concurrent through Duffield (where the concurrency also picks up U.S. 23), Gate City, Weber City (where the US 23 concurrency ends), and Bristol, where US 58 begins a concurrency with Interstate 81. The two routes stay concurrent until I-81 exit 19 in Abingdon, where US 58 resumes its eastward journey close to the Virginia–North Carolina state line. The route is signed as the J.E.B. Stuart Highway and the A.L. Philpott Memorial Highway. Much of the highway through the region features hairpin turns, steep grades, and load-zoned bridges.

US 58 begins a concurrency with US 221 in Independence, and the routes stay merged through Hillsville, just past the interchange with Interstate 77. Continuing eastward, the route crosses the Blue Ridge Parkway in the unincorporated community of Meadows of Dan before winding its way to Martinsville, where US 58 and US 220 share a southern bypass of the city. Between Stuart and the Martinsville bypass, several loops are found following the original alignment. East of Martinsville, a loop between Byrd's Store and Axton follows the original alignment, although one section west of Byrd's Store and one section east of Chatmoss remain inaccessible. Between Martinsville and Danville and between Danville and South Boston the route was widened to four lanes as part of the Arterial Highway system initiated by the Commonwealth in the mid 1960s. A newer alignment was generally just added to the older alignment. A loop of the older alignment is visible east of Brosville.

Approaching Danville, US 58 once again follows an expressway bypass to the south of the city, while a business route enters the city itself. It reaches its southernmost point near the North Carolina state line at its interchange with US 29, where the exit ramp to southbound US 29 immediately enters North Carolina, and the ramp to eastbound US 58 from northbound US 29 instantly enters Virginia. Drivers continuing into the city without exiting onto US 58 east instantly enter Virginia before going under the bridge that carries the bypass. The southeastern half of this bypass is shared with 9. East of Danville, US 29 continues north, while US 58 picks up US 360 (which begins in central Danville) and resumes its eastward journey. The routes stay cosigned until South Boston, where US 360 resumes a more northerly route to Richmond, while US 58 travels eastward to Clarksville and crosses Kerr Lake.

The route crosses US 1 and Interstate 85 in South Hill, followed by Interstate 95 and US 301 in Emporia. Near Franklin, an expressway bypass carries US 58 (and, for one stretch, US 258) south of the city, while a business route enters the city. A bypass also carries traffic around Suffolk, where US 58 begins concurrencies with US 13 and then US 460. The three US routes stay merged until an intersection with the Hampton Roads Beltway at the confluence of I-64, I-264, and I-664. US 58 travels inside the beltway and through Portsmouth and into Norfolk via the Midtown Tunnel. The route crosses I-64 once again, and continues to Virginia Beach, roughly paralleling I-264 to its south. US 58, designated as Virginia Beach Boulevard and becoming Laskin Road in Virginia Beach, ends at US 60, Pacific Avenue. Historically, US 58 continued for one additional block to the east, ending at Atlantic Avenue, which once carried US 60 and then Business US 60.

Much of the western section of US 58 is part of Crooked Road, Virginia and The Crooked Road: Virginia's Heritage Music Trail.

=== Alternate route ===
U.S. Route 58 Alternate
- Location: Jonesville–Abingdon
- Length: 87.40 mi (140.66 km)
- Existed: early 1950s–present
- Tourist routes: Virginia Byway

An alternate route of US 58, known as U.S. Route 58 Alternate (US 58 Alt.), splits from the main route in Abingdon, Virginia and travels northwest (signed west) as the "Trail of the Lonesome Pine" to Coeburn. From there, US 58 Alt. travels in a southwesterly direction (signed west) through Norton, Big Stone Gap and Pennington Gap before rejoining the main route in Jonesville.

== History ==
The corridor across southern Virginia was part of the initial 1918 state highway system, in which it was State Route 12. It generally followed the present U.S. 58 from Abingdon to Virginia Beach, while present US 58 west of Abingdon was part of State Route 10. These routes deviated from present US 58 in the following places:

- SR 10 left Virginia into Kentucky at Cumberland Gap; the piece of current US 58 into Tennessee was (in general terms) State Route 107 from 1923 to 1928 and State Route 100 from 1928 to 1933 (as well as U.S. Route 25E from 1926 to 1996).
- SR 10 used present U.S. Route 58 Alternate from Jonesville to Pennington Gap and U.S. Route 421 southeast back to U.S. 58.
- SR 10 used present State Route 638 and State Route 600 from near Pattonsville to Clinchport.
- SR 10 used present U.S. Route 421 and U.S. Route 11 through Bristol to Abingdon. From Abingdon to Meadowview, where SR 12 began, SR 10 used present State Route 609.
- SR 12 used present State Route 80 and State Route 803 from Meadowview to Lodi and roughly present State Route 91 to Damascus.
- From Danville to Boydton, SR 12 used present State Route 360 to near Scottsburg, U.S. Route 360 to Clover, and State Route 92 to Boydton. Present US 58 was State Route 44 (formed ca. 1930) from Danville to Clarksville, and from Clarksville to Boydton it was initially part of State Route 1, renumbered State Route 31 in the 1923 renumbering, State Route 324 from soon after 1923 to 1927, part of State Route 201 from 1927 to 1928, and State Route 400 from 1928 to 1933.
- From Suffolk to Portsmouth, SR 12 used present State Route 337.

In the 1950s there were plans to extend US 58 from Cumberland Gap to St. Louis, using US 25-E to London, KY, using Kentucky Route 80 to Kentucky Lake, or via KY 56 across the new Ohio River bridge at Shawneetown, Ill.

The section from Emporia to Courtland was known as the "Suicide Strip," between 1970 and 1990 there were 1334 accidents and 107 deaths. The area featured a sign warning drivers about the "Suicide Strip," which led locals to organize a campaign named "58 Can't Wait" to fix the problem. The problem that was finally fixed in 1991 when US 58 was expanded into a 4 lane highway.

== Major intersections ==
State	County	Location	mi	km	Destinations	Notes
Tennessee	Claiborne	Cumberland Gap	0.00	0.00	US 25E (SR 32) – Harrogate, TN, Tazewell, TN, Middlesboro, KY	Interchange; western terminus
Cumberland Gap			0.6 0.00	0.97 0.00	Tennessee–Virginia state line	
Virginia	Lee				SR 687 (Dr. Thomas Walker Road) to US 58 Bus. – Ewing, Rose Hill	
Virginia	Lee				US 58 Bus. west (Dr. Thomas Walker Road) – Rose Hill, Ewing	
Virginia	Lee				SR 758 (Flanary Bridge Road) / SR 880 (Red Fletcher Road) – Lee County Airport	Former SR 63 south
Virginia	Lee	Jonesville	33.36	53.69	US 58 Alt. east (Main Street) / SR 649 (Park Street) – Pennington Gap, Norton	
Virginia	Lee	Jonesville			SR 70 south – Blackwater	
Virginia	Lee	Dot	42.51	68.41	US 421 north – Pennington Gap	West end of US 421 overlap
Virginia	Scott				SR 638 (Powell Mountain Road)	Former SR 66 north
Virginia	Scott	Duffield	53.26	85.71	US 23 north / SR 871 (Natural Tunnel Parkway) – Big Stone Gap	West end of US 23 overlap
Virginia	Scott	see US 23 (mile 20.85-2.92)				
Virginia	Scott	Weber City	71.19	114.57	US 23 south – Kingsport	East end of US 23 overlap; west end of SR 224 overlap
Virginia	Scott		71.45	114.99	SR 224 south (Wadlow Gap Highway) – Kingsport	East end of SR 224 overlap
Virginia	Scott	Hiltons			SR 709 (A.P. Carter Highway) – Carter Fold	to former SR 42 east
Virginia	Washington				SR 700 (Rich Valley Road)	Former SR 77 north
Virginia	City of Bristol		95.67	153.97	I-81 south / US 421 south – Bristol, Knoxville	East end of US 421 overlap; west end of I-81 overlap; US 58 west follows exit 1B
Virginia	see I-81					
Virginia	Washington		113.95	183.38	I-81 north / US 11 south (Lee Highway) – Roanoke, Abingdon	East end of I-81 overlap; west end of US 11 overlap; US 58 east follows exit 19
Virginia	Washington		114.25	183.87	US 11 north (Lee Highway)	East end of US 11 overlap
Virginia	Washington	Damascus	124.23	199.93	Appalachian Trail	West end of trail/street overlap
Virginia	Washington	Damascus	124.42	200.23	SR 716 (Shady Avenue) – Backbone Rock, Shady Valley	to SR 133 (TN)
Virginia	Washington	Damascus	124.73	200.73	SR 91 north (Damascus Drive) – Saltville	West end of SR 91 overlap
Virginia	Washington	Damascus	125.13	201.38	Appalachian Trail	East end of trail/street overlap
Virginia	Washington	Laureldale	125.72	202.33	SR 91 south (Mountain City Road) – Mountain City	East end of SR 91 overlap
Virginia	Washington				SR 603 (Konnarock Road) – Konnarock	
Virginia	Washington				SR 600 (Green Cove Road) – Green Cove, Taylors Valley	
Virginia	Grayson				SR 600 (Whitetop Road) – Whitetop Mountain, Chilhowie	
Virginia	Grayson		150.72	242.56	SR 362 north (Grayson Highlands Lane) – Grayson Highlands State Park	
Virginia	Grayson				SR 743 (Rugby Road)	to NC 194
Virginia	Grayson	Volney	158.47	255.03	SR 16 north (Troutdale Highway) – Troutdale, Marion	West end of SR 16 overlap
Virginia	Grayson	Mouth of Wilson	162.46	261.45	SR 16 south (Jefferson Highway) – Jefferson	East end of SR 16 overlap
Virginia	Grayson				SR 93 south (County Line Road) – NC line, Sparta	
Virginia	Grayson	Independence	175.15	281.88	US 21 south / US 221 – Wytheville, Sparta	West end of US 221 overlap
Virginia	Grayson		177.90	286.30	SR 274 east (Riverside Drive) to SR 94 – Fries	
Virginia	Grayson	Reavistown	186.58	300.27	SR 94 north (Riverside Drive) – Fries	
Virginia	City of Galax		189.71	305.31	SR 89 south (Main Street)	
Virginia	City of Galax				SR 89 Truck south (Meadow Street)	
Virginia	Carroll		199.98	321.84	I-77 – Wytheville, Charlotte	I-77 exit 14
Virginia	Carroll	Hillsville			US 58 Bus. east / US 221 north – Hillsville	Interchange; east end of US 221 overlap
Virginia	Carroll	Hillsville			US 52 – Hillsville, Fancy Gap	Interchange
Virginia	Carroll				US 58 Bus. west – Hillsville, Dublin	Interchange
Virginia	Floyd	No major junctions				
Virginia	Patrick		222.09	357.42	US 58 Bus. east (J.E.B. Stuart Highway) – Meadows of Dan, Blue Ridge Parkway	
Virginia	Patrick	Meadows of Dan	223.99	360.48	US 58 Bus. west / SR 795 (J.E.B. Stuart Highway / Mabry Mill Road) – Meadows of Dan, Blue Ridge Parkway	
Virginia	Patrick	Meadows of Dan			SR 758 (Willis Road) – Willis	Former SR 102 north
Virginia	Patrick	Cruzes Store	234.87	377.99	SR 8 north (Woolwine Highway) – Floyd, Philpott Dam	West end of SR 8 overlap
Virginia	Patrick	Stuart	236.88	381.22	SR 8 south / US 58 Bus. east (West Blue Ridge Street) – Stuart	East end of SR 8 overlap
Virginia	Patrick	Stuart	237.74	382.61	SR 1025 – Stuart	Interchange
Virginia	Patrick	Stuart	238.43	383.72	US 58 Bus. west (East Blue Ridge Street) / SR 830 (Morrison Lane) to SR 8 south – Stuart	
Virginia	Patrick				SR 626 (Abram Penn Highway) – Reynolds Homestead	Former SR 105 north
Virginia	Henry		260.87	419.83	US 220 north / US 58 Bus. east – Martinsville, Roanoke	Interchange; west end of US 220 overlap
Virginia	Henry				SR 641 (Joseph Martin Highway)	Interchange
Virginia	Henry		264.36	425.45	US 220 south / US 220 Bus. north – Martinsville, Greensboro	Interchange; east end of US 220 overlap
Virginia	Henry		267.01	429.71	SR 650 (Irisburg Road)	Interchange
Virginia	Henry		270.93	436.02	US 58 Bus. west – Martinsville	Interchange
Virginia	Henry	Axton			SR 610 (Axton Road) / SR 647 (Mountain Valley Road) – Aiken Summit, Sandy Level, Eden NC	Former SR 107 south
Virginia	Pittsylvania	Bachelors Hall	285.06	458.76	US 58 Bus. east – Danville	West end of freeway section
Virginia	Pittsylvania	Vandola	287.57	462.80	US 311 south (Harville-Saunders Parkway) / SR 1260 east (Oak Ridge Farms Road) – Winston-Salem	Northern terminus of US 311; western terminus of SR 1260
Virginia	City of Danville		292.32	470.44	US 29 south (SR 785 south) / US 29 Bus. north – Danville, Greensboro	Interchange ramps extend into North Carolina; west end of US 29/SR 785 overlap; west end of future I-785 overlap
Virginia	City of Danville		See US 29			
Virginia	City of Danville		299.28	481.64	US 29 north (Danville Expressway) / US 360 west / US 58 Bus. west / SR 785 end – Lynchburg, Danville	East end of US 29/SR 785 overlap; west end of US 360 overlap; future northern terminus of I-785
Virginia	Pittsylvania		304.53	490.09	SR 62 south (Milton Highway) / SR 726 north (Ringgold Depot Road) – Milton NC	
Virginia	Halifax	Delila	311.33	501.04	SR 119 south (Calvary Road) / SR 694 north (Medley Road)	
Virginia	Halifax	South Boston (Riverdale)	327.16	526.51	US 501 (Huell Matthews Highway) – South Boston, Roxboro NC	West end of US 501 Truck overlap
Virginia	Halifax		327.86	527.64	US 360 east / US 501 Truck north – Richmond, Speedway	East end of US 360 / US 501 Truck overlap
Virginia	Mecklenburg	Sandy Fork	344.38	554.23	SR 49 south – Virgilina	West end of SR 49 overlap
Virginia	Mecklenburg	Puryear Corner	345.64	556.25	US 58 Bus. east – Clarksville, Town of Clarksville Historic District	
Virginia	Mecklenburg	Clarksville	347.10	558.60	US 15 – Clarksville, Oxford NC	Interchange
Virginia	Mecklenburg		349.52	562.50	US 15 / US 58 Bus. west / SR 49 north – Clarksville, Chase City	Interchange; east end of SR 49 overlap
Virginia	Mecklenburg				SR 364 south – Occoneechee State Park	
Virginia	Mecklenburg	Boydton			US 58 Bus. east (Skipwith Road) / SR 688 – Skipwith, Boydton, Town of Boydton Historic District	
Virginia	Mecklenburg		358.72	577.30	SR 92 – Chase City, Boydton	
Virginia	Mecklenburg				US 58 Bus. west – Town of Boydton Historic District	
Virginia	Mecklenburg				SR 368 / SR 883 (Herbert Drive) – Mecklenburg Correctional Center	
Virginia	Mecklenburg		364.51	586.62	SR 4 south (Buggs Island Road) / SR 674 (Wooden Bridge Road) – Kerr Dam	
Virginia	Mecklenburg	Big Fork	368.74	593.43	US 1 south – Raleigh	West end of US 1 overlap
Virginia	Mecklenburg		371.89	598.50	US 1 north / US 58 Bus. east / SR 780 – South Hill	East end of US 1 overlap
Virginia	Mecklenburg	South Hill			SR 903 – South Hill	Interchange; to NC 903
Virginia	Mecklenburg	South Hill	375.45	604.23	US 58 Bus. west (Atlantic Street) / SR 643 (Country Lane) to US 1 north / SR 47 north – South Hill, Chase City	
Virginia	Mecklenburg	South Hill	375.69	604.61	I-85 – Petersburg, Durham	I-85 exit 12
Virginia	Mecklenburg	La Crosse			SR 618 (Country Club Road / North Main Street) – La Crosse Business District	Former SR 138 south
Virginia	Brunswick				SR 659 (Main Street)	Former SR 139 south
Virginia	Brunswick	Lawrenceville			US 58 Bus. east / SR 46	Interchange; west end of SR 46 Truck overlap
Virginia	Brunswick				US 58 Bus. west / SR 46 Truck north – Lawrenceville, St. Pauls College, Blackstone	Interchange; east end of SR 46 Truck overlap
Virginia	Brunswick				SR 670 (Airport Drive) – Lawrenceville Airport	Former SR 140 south
Virginia	Brunswick	Edgerton			SR 712 (Old Stage Road / Brooks Crossing Road)	Former SR 140 north
Virginia	Greensville	No major junctions				
Virginia	City of Emporia				SR 619 (Purdy Road / Wiggins Road)	Former SR 88 west
Virginia	City of Emporia		410.74	661.02	I-95 – Richmond, Rocky Mount	I-95 exit 11
Virginia	City of Emporia				US 58 Bus. east – Emporia	
Virginia	City of Emporia		411.58	662.37	US 301 – Emporia	Interchange
Virginia	City of Emporia		412.22	663.40	SR 614 (Reese Street)	Interchange
Virginia	City of Emporia		412.71	664.19	SR 611 (Davis Street)	Interchange
Virginia	City of Emporia		413.36	665.24	US 58 Bus. west – Emporia	
Virginia	Greensville	No major junctions				
Virginia	Southampton				SR 308 north (Three Creeks Road) – Sussex CH, Southampton Correctional Farm, Deerfield Correctional Center	
Virginia	Southampton		436.82	702.99	SR 35 (US 58 Bus. east) – Boykins, Courtland	
Virginia	Southampton		440.28	708.56	US 58 Bus. west – Courtland	
Virginia	Southampton		442.78	712.59	US 58 Bus. east (Camp Parkway) – Downtown Franklin	
Virginia	Southampton				SR 671 (Armory Drive) – Downtown Franklin	Interchange
Virginia	Southampton		446.52	718.60	US 258 south / US 258 Bus. north – Franklin, Murfreesboro	Interchange; west end of US 258 overlap
Virginia	Southampton				SR 714 (Pretlow Street)	Interchange; former SR 189
Virginia	City of Suffolk		450.81	725.51	US 258 north / SR 189 south – Windsor, Smithfield	Interchange; east end of US 258 overlap; west end of SR 189 overlap
Virginia	City of Suffolk		452.00	727.42	SR 272 west (South Quay Road)	
Virginia	City of Suffolk		456.17	734.13	SR 189 north (South Quay Road) – Holland	East end of SR 189 overlap
Virginia	City of Suffolk		457.28	735.92	US 58 Bus. west – Holland, Franklin	Interchange; westbound exit and eastbound entrance
Virginia	City of Suffolk		465.62	749.34	US 13 south to SR 32 – Ahoskie NC, Edenton NC	Interchange; west end of US 13 overlap
Virginia	City of Suffolk				US 58 Bus. east (Holland Road) – Downtown Suffolk	
Virginia	City of Suffolk		467.03	751.61	SR 604 (Pitchkettle Road)	Interchange
Virginia	City of Suffolk		468.91	754.64	US 460 west (US 460 Bus. east) – Petersburg, Downtown Suffolk	Interchange; west end of US 460 overlap
Virginia	City of Suffolk		469.84	756.13	SR 10 / SR 32 – Smithfield, Newport News, Downtown Suffolk	Interchange
Virginia	City of Suffolk		471.71	759.14	SR 642 (Wilroy Road)	Interchange
Virginia	City of Suffolk		474.01	762.85	US 13 Bus. south / US 58 Bus. west / US 460 Bus. west – Downtown Suffolk	Interchange; westbound exit and eastbound entrance
Virginia	City of Chesapeake		479.88	772.29	I-664 / US 13 north / US 460 east (Hampton Roads Beltway) to I-64 / I-264 east – Newport News, Hampton, Portsmouth, Richmond, Norfolk, Virginia Beach	I-664 exit 13; east end of US 13 / US 460 overlap (eastbound); west end of US 460 Alt. overlap (eastbound)
Virginia	City of Chesapeake		480.52	773.32	SR 191 (Jolliff Road) to South Military Highway north / US 13 east / US 460	East end of US 13 / US 460 overlap (westbound); west end of US 460 Alt. overlap (westbound)
Virginia	City of Portsmouth		484.03	778.97	SR 239 (Victory Boulevard)	
Virginia	City of Portsmouth		484.31	779.42	US 460 Alt. / SR 337 (Portsmouth Boulevard) to SR 337 Alt. east	East end of US 460 Alt. overlap
Virginia	City of Portsmouth		485.71	781.67	US 17 (Frederick Boulevard) to I-264	
Virginia	City of Portsmouth				To High Street north / US 17	
Virginia	City of Portsmouth		486.62	783.14	SR 337 Alt. west (Harbor Drive)	Interchange; westbound exit and eastbound entrance; west end of SR 337 Alt. overlap
Virginia	City of Portsmouth		486.62	783.14	SR 141 south (London Boulevard) – Downtown Portsmouth	Interchange
Virginia	City of Portsmouth				Port Norfolk	Interchange
Virginia	City of Portsmouth		487.39	784.38	SR 164 west to I-664 – Suffolk, Newport News	Interchange
Virginia	Elizabeth River				Midtown Tunnel	
Virginia	City of Norfolk		489.20	787.29	SR 337 east (Hampton Boulevard) / Brambleton Avenue – Chelsea, NS Railway Lambert's Point Docks, Old Dominion University, Naval Station Norfolk	Interchange; east end of SR 337 Alt. overlap; west end of SR 337 overlap
Virginia	City of Norfolk		490.29	789.05	SR 337 west (Brambleton Avenue) to I-264	East end of SR 337 overlap
Virginia	City of Norfolk				US 460 (Church Street)	
Virginia	City of Norfolk		491.47	790.94	SR 168 (Tidewater Drive) to I-264 east	
Virginia	City of Norfolk				SR 166 (Park Avenue)	
Virginia	City of Norfolk		492.96	793.34	To Ballentine Boulevard (SR 405 south) / I-264	
Virginia	City of Norfolk		495.19	796.93	US 13 (Military Highway)	Interchange
Virginia	City of Norfolk		495.98	798.20	SR 165 (Kempsville Road)	
Virginia	Norfolk–Virginia Beach city line				SR 403 (North Newtown Road) to I-64 / I-264	
Virginia	City of Virginia Beach		498.24	801.84	SR 190 (Witchduck Road) to I-264	
Virginia	City of Virginia Beach		499.35	803.63	SR 225 (Independence Boulevard)	
Virginia	City of Virginia Beach				To Rosemont Road / I-264	Former SR 411 south
Virginia	City of Virginia Beach				To Lynnhaven Parkway / I-264	Former SR 414 south
Virginia	City of Virginia Beach		504.37	811.70	Great Neck Road (SR 279 north)	
Virginia	City of Virginia Beach		504.51	811.93	US 58 Bus. east (Virginia Beach Boulevard) – Oceana	Interchange; eastbound exit and westbound entrance
Virginia	City of Virginia Beach		504.51	811.93	I-264 west – Norfolk	I-264 exit 20; westbound exit and eastbound entrance
Virginia	City of Virginia Beach				First Colonial Road	Former SR 408 north
Virginia	City of Virginia Beach		508.48	818.32	US 60 (Pacific Avenue)	Eastern terminus
1.000 mi = 1.609 km; 1.000 km = 0.621 mi: Concurrency terminus; Electronic toll collection; Incomplete access

== See also ==
- Virginia Beach Boulevard

=== Related U.S. Routes ===
- U.S. Route 158
- U.S. Route 258
- Special routes of U.S. Route 58

Browse numbered routes
< SR 11	Two‑digit State Routes; 1923-1933	SR 13 >
< SR 323	Spurs of SR 32; 1923–1928	SR 325 >
< SR 104	District 1 State Routes; 1928–1933	SR 106 >
none	District 4 State Routes; 1928–1933	SR 401 >
