= Western Branch Elizabeth River =

Coordinates: 36°50′56″N 76°21′28″W

Location
- Country: United States

Physical characteristics
- Source
  - location: Virginia

The Western Branch Elizabeth River is a 7.0-mile-long (11.3 km) tidal river which bisects the city of Portsmouth, Virginia, in the United States. It is a tributary of the Elizabeth River, part of the harbor of Hampton Roads in southeastern Virginia.

== See also ==
- List of rivers of Virginia
