= Civil Remedial Fees (Virginia) =

Virginia Remedial Fees were a set of taxes enacted by the Virginia General Assembly that collected up to $3,000 for minor moving violations such as failing to signal a turn and speeding 10 mph over the limit on a 70 mph road. The taxes were enacted as a way to fund various transportation projects without raising other taxes, and with the side benefit of discouraging abusive driving. However, the taxes were criticized for being excessive and not being levied against out-of-state drivers.

The taxes became the subject of a massive Internet petition-signing effort calling for their repeal. Some legislators across the Commonwealth, aware of the intense opposition, began reversing their positions and opposing the taxes.

On March 8, 2008, the last day of the session, the Assembly repealed the taxes and promised to refund the money that had been collected. At 10:15 p.m., at least ten Republican state senators refused to vote in favor of the legislation, which would have prevented the repeal taking immediate effect (as soon as the Governor signed the bill). However, at 10:25 p.m., it passed 37–3 on a re-vote, a result which allowed for an immediate effective date.
