= Port Norfolk Historic District =

Historic district in Virginia, United States

- U.S. National Register of Historic Places
- U.S. Historic district
- Virginia Landmarks Register
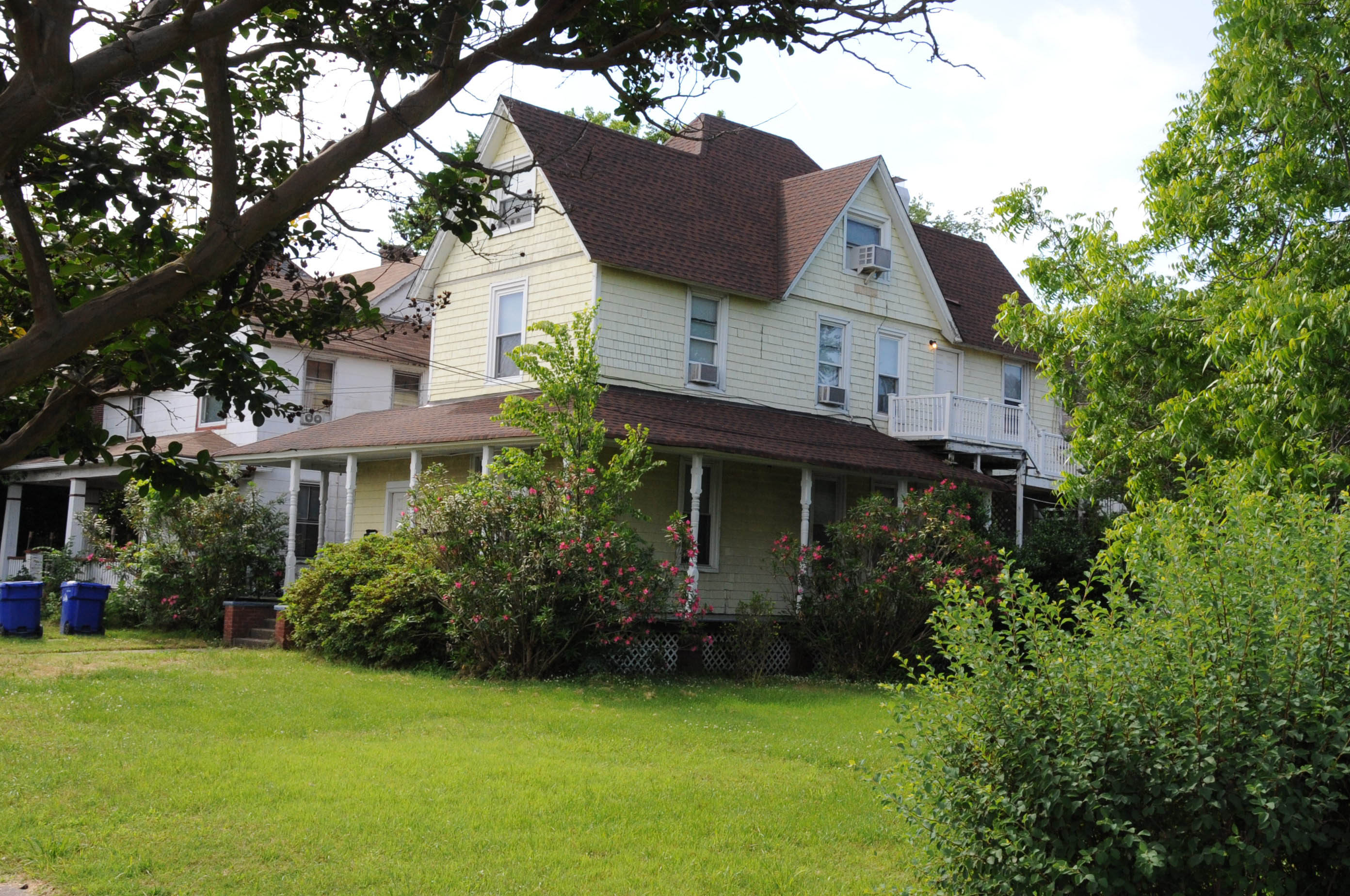
- House on Bayview Boulevard

- Location within Virginia Location within the United States
- Location: Roughly bounded by Bayview Blvd., Chatauqua Ave., Hartford St., Douglas Ave. and Hull Creek, Portsmouth, Virginia
- Coordinates: 36°50′54″N 76°20′14″W
- Area: 160 acres (65 ha)
- Built: 1890
- Architectural style: Bungalow/craftsman, Queen Anne, American Four Square
- NRHP reference No.: 83003299
- VLR No.: 124-0051

Significant dates
- Added to NRHP: September 30, 1983
- Designated VLR: August 16, 1983

Port Norfolk Historic District is a national historic district located at Portsmouth, Virginia. It encompasses 621 contributing buildings and 1 contributing site in a primarily residential section of suburban Portsmouth. It was developed between about 1890 and 1910, and includes notable examples of Queen Anne, Bungalow / American Craftsman, and American Foursquare style single family residences.

It was listed on the National Register of Historic Places in 1983.
