= Downtown Tunnel =

Tunnel across Southern Branch Elizabeth River in Virginia

Coordinates: 36°49′58.5″N 76°17′37″W

I-264 Downtown Tunnel
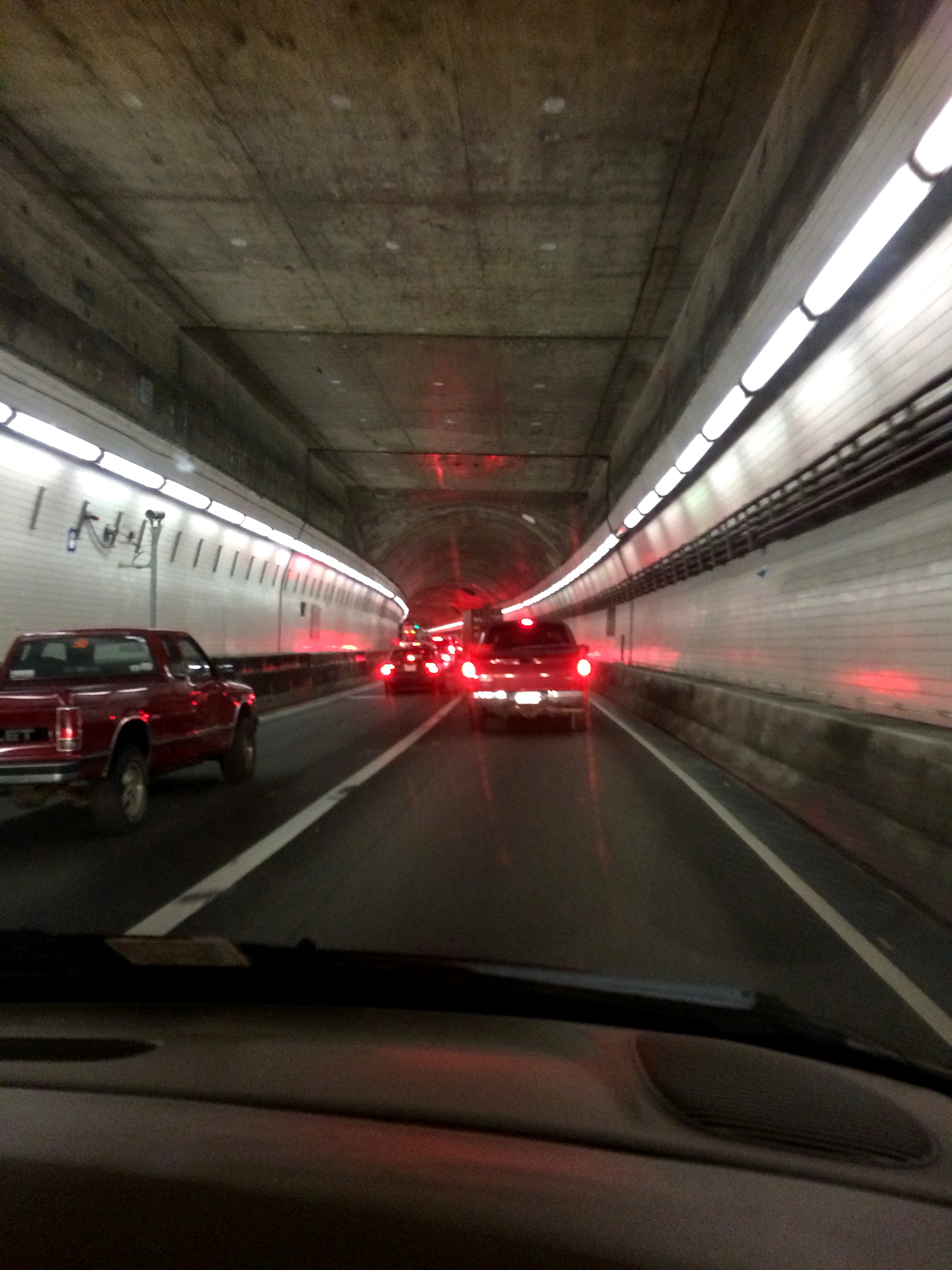
- Inside of the Eastbound I-264 Downtown Tunnel, which was renovated in 2014 as part of the Elizabeth River Tunnels Project.
- Interactive map of I-264 Downtown Tunnel

Overview
- Official name: Downtown Tunnel
- Location: Portsmouth—Norfolk
- Status: Open to traffic
- Route: I-264 / US 460 Alt.

Operation
- Opened: First tunnel: 1952; second tunnel:1987
- Owner: VDOT
- Operator: Elizabeth River Crossings OpCo, LLC
- Traffic: vehicle
- Toll: With E-ZPass: $1.94 off peak; $2.50 peak (Note: Peak hours are from (5:30-9am, 2:30-7pm)); Pay by Plate: $5.81 off peak; $6.37 peak
- Vehicles per day: 72,000

Technical
- No. of lanes: 4
- Operating speed: 35 miles per hour (56 km/h)
- Tunnel clearance: 13 ft (4.0 m)

The Downtown Tunnel on Interstate 264 (I-264) and U.S. Route 460 Alternate (US 460 Alt.) crosses the Southern Branch of the Elizabeth River in the South Hampton Roads area of Virginia, US. It links the independent City of Portsmouth with the independent City of Norfolk. In conjunction with the Berkley Bridge, the Downtown Tunnel connects to Interstate 464 to the City of Chesapeake and a continuation I-264 to the downtown and Waterside areas of Norfolk, and on to Virginia Beach. Owned by the Virginia Department of Transportation (VDOT), it is operated and maintained by Elizabeth River Crossings under a 58-year public–private partnership concession agreement. Formerly a toll-free facility, open road tolling was implemented on February 1, 2014, by VDOT to help finance repairs and expansion to the tunnel.

== History ==
Any time you build a complex interchange in a downtown metropolitan area with an underwater tunnel and a bridge with a liftspan for river traffic, you have a real challenge. Nowhere else in Virginia can you come out of a tunnel and cross a drawbridge.

— Jack Hodge, Former VDOT Chief Engineer

In the mid-1940s, Virginia legislators wanted to replace the aging vehicle ferry system that transported its motorists over the waterways in the state. Authorized by a revenue bond act passed earlier by the General Assembly, the commission decided during the 1946-47 fiscal year to construct toll bridges to replace ferry crossings on the York River at Yorktown and the Rappahannock River at [Grey's Point] and to acquire from private owners the ferries that carried vehicles across Hampton Roads between the Norfolk and Lower Peninsula areas. Shortly thereafter in 1952, VDOT opened a two-lane tunnel (then named the Norfolk-Portsmouth Bridge-Tunnel). It was the first fixed crossing directly between Portsmouth and Norfolk across the Elizabeth River, predating the Hampton Roads Bridge Tunnel by five years. It was financed and built by the Elizabeth River Tunnel Commission with toll revenue bonds and was completed in 1952. Tolls at the time were 25 cents.

In 1988 and 1989, during an expansion of I-264, the Downtown Tunnel was expanded to two tunnels (one two-lane tunnel in each direction), and the nearby Berkley Bridge was rebuilt and expanded to eight lanes, connecting I-264 to I-464, just short of (and above) the tunnel entrance. Tolls were also removed at that time.

Between 2019 and 2022 there have been increased occurrences of fake toll violations to drivers. Many of the drivers who received these notices have never crossed the river, or even, been to the state of Virginia. EZ-Pass has been criticized for failing to address the fraudulent toll violations.

== Public-private partnership and 2013 rehabilitation ==
In 2004, VDOT sent out an informal request for information to private entities to gauge interest in pursuing a public-private partnership to help build the parallel Midtown Tunnel and extend the MLK Freeway to I-264. At the time, the project did not include any work at the Downtown Tunnel. Of the three companies that responded, two of the companies, one being the company that ultimately bid on the current project (Skanska), referred to a study funded earlier in the year noting that the only possible way of making the project financially feasible was to toll the Downtown Tunnel as well as the Midtown Tunnel for construction costs. VDOT then began soliciting bids from private companies to partner with the state in executing the Elizabeth River Tunnels Project, which now included the rehabilitation of the Downtown Tunnel) through Virginia's Public Private Transportation Act.

Elizabeth River Crossings, the company formed by interested party Skanska with additional capital by Australian investment company Macquarie Group, submitted their proposal to VDOT. After the lengthy review process required under the PPTA, then-Governor Bob McDonnell and VDOT executed the Comprehensive Agreement with ERC on December 5, 2011.^{[15][16]} Under the agreement, VDOT retains ownership and oversight of the tunnels, while ERC finances, builds, operates and maintains the facilities for a 58-year concession period.

Under the agreement, the work on the Downtown Tunnel consisted of different items based on NFPA 502 standards, work which includes:

- Removing the suspended ceiling of the eastbound tunnel (the westbound tunnel suspended celling was removed in 2011 due to safety concerns)
- Removing old lighting and replacing with energy-efficient LED lighting
- Installing a new longitudinal ventilation system with eight sets of jet fans (16 total each tunnel),
- Removing police booths and other cosmetic level rehab work.

Work on the westbound tunnel began on August 9, 2013. Rehabilitation work on the eastbound tunnel began on July 25, 2014. The completion date of the Downtown Tunnel rehabilitation work was November 3, 2016.
