= Elizabeth River (Virginia) =

River in Virginia

Coordinates: 36°55′30″N 76°20′37″W

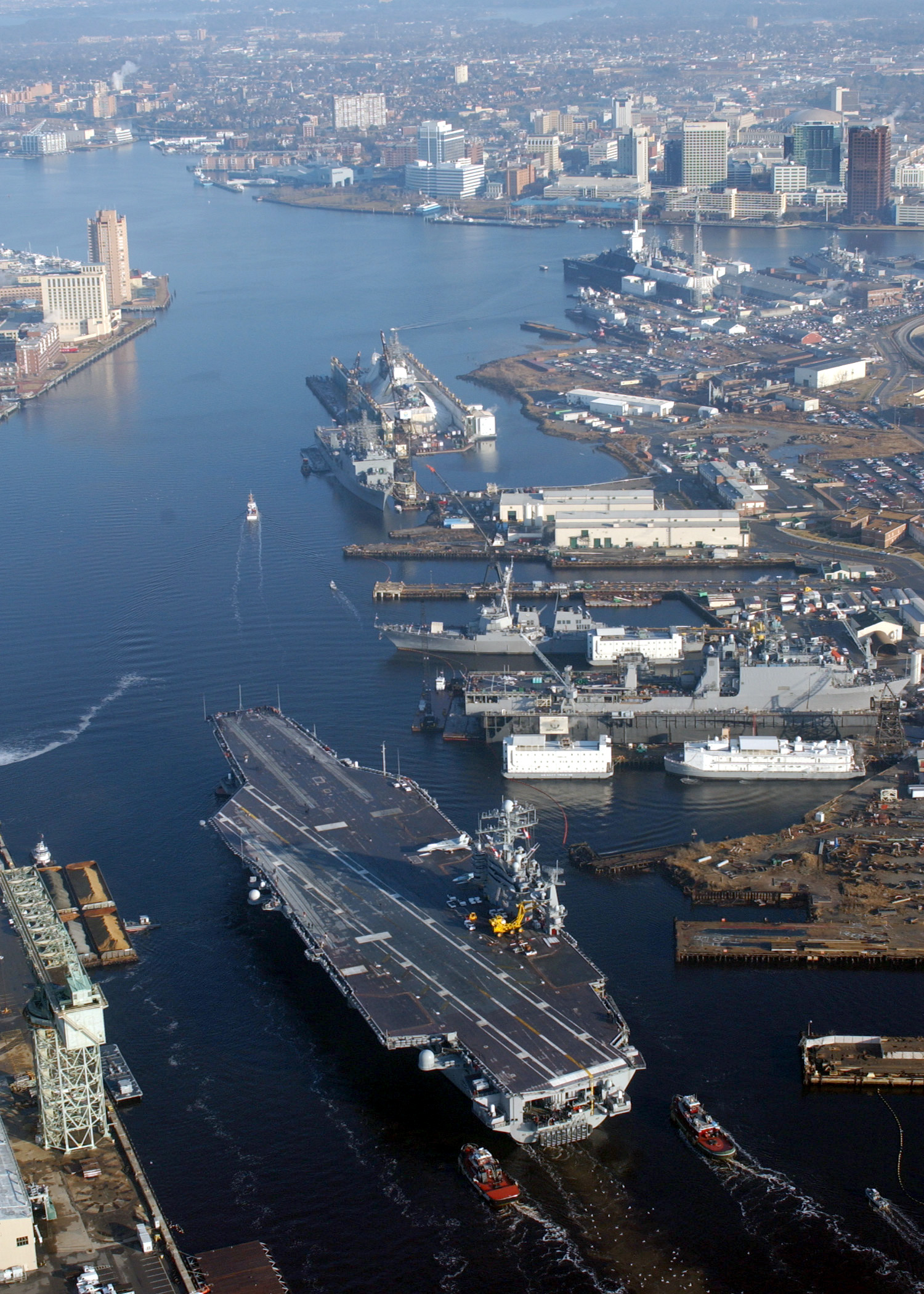
A portion of the Elizabeth River at Norfolk Naval Shipyard, at Portsmouth. The city of Portsmouth is on the left and Norfolk is on the right. USS Harry S. Truman (CVN-75) is heading downriver. View is to the north.

The Elizabeth River is a 6-mile-long (10 km) tidal estuary forming an arm of Hampton Roads harbor at the southern end of the Chesapeake Bay in southeast Virginia in the United States. It is located along the southern side of the mouth of the James River, between the cities of Portsmouth, Norfolk, and Chesapeake. Forming the core of the Hampton Roads harbor, it is heavily supported by its tributaries which depend upon it.

Through its Southern Branch and the Albemarle and Chesapeake Canal, the Elizabeth River also is a gateway to points to the south for the Atlantic Intracoastal Waterway, an inland path from the ocean providing a more sheltered navigable waterway to Florida for commercial and recreational boating.

== History ==
The Elizabeth River was named by the Jamestown colonists in the early 17th century for Princess Elizabeth Stuart, She was the daughter of King James I of England and a sister of the later King Charles I, and his older brother, Henry Frederick, the ill-fated heir-apparent to the throne who died of typhoid fever as a teenager.

When the settlers aboard the three tiny ships of Captain Christopher Newport's 1607 voyage first discovered the great harbor of Hampton Roads a few days after reaching land at Cape Henry, they were seeking a pathway to the west to reach the "Great Indies" and soon sailed upriver along the largest and most likely westerly river, which they named the James (for their king), passing by the areas closest to the ocean as they sought a protected haven from other European forces such as the Spanish. Their settlement 35 miles (56 km) inland at Jamestown was flawed in many other ways, but did meet the requirement of providing protection. Settlement along the Elizabeth River came a few years later.

During the U.S. Revolutionary War, Lord Dunmore and the British Army sailed up the Elizabeth River and landed in Norfolk. The British Army and the U.S. Continental Army then engaged at the Battle of Great Bridge on December 9, 1775. Upon British defeat, Lord Dunmore and his army withdrew onto four ships of the British Royal Navy, the Dunmore, the Liverpool, the Otter, and the Kingfisher. Under the command of Lord Dunmore, these ships patrolled along Norfolk's Elizabeth River waterfront and on New Year's Day 1776, began shelling Norfolk in what would later become known as the Burning of Norfolk.

During the War of 1812, two harbor fortifications located on opposite banks of the Elizabeth River were occupied to prevent the British from attacking Norfolk or Portsmouth. These defensive positions were Fort Norfolk, located on the eastern bank in Norfolk, and Fort Nelson, located on the western bank in Portsmouth. Neither of these forts saw action during the War of 1812. However, the men stationed at Fort Norfolk reinforced Craney Island, located at the mouth of the Elizabeth River, and took part in the Battle of Craney Island.

== Geography ==
The main branch of the estuary is approximately 6 miles (10 km) long and is 2 miles (3 km) wide at its mouth. It is formed by three primary branches, all tidal, known as the Eastern, Southern, and Western branches of the Elizabeth River, extending 7 to 14 miles (11 to 23 km) into neighboring communities. The Western and Southern branches are partially fed by tributaries that originate within the Great Dismal Swamp.

== Importance and use ==
The Elizabeth River estuary and its tributaries provide significant military and commercial port facilities for Norfolk and Portsmouth, as well as a third major city, Chesapeake, which was formed by the voluntary political consolidation in 1963 of the small independent city of South Norfolk with much larger Norfolk County, which had long surrounded the other two large and expanding cities. The three cities surround the Elizabeth River and most of the area served by its three main branches. The Elizabeth River is the home of the oldest shipyard in the United States, the Norfolk Naval Shipyard. Founded as The Gosport Shipyard in 1767, the shipyard is still in use today having survived both the American Revolutionary and Civil wars and fires set to the shipyard within each conflict.

The river and its branches provide for both commerce and recreation activities. The Intracoastal Waterway connects to the greater Hampton Roads area through the Elizabeth River. They are of great importance to both commerce and the U.S. military considerations.

== Environmental concerns ==
The Elizabeth River is a tributary of the Chesapeake Bay and faces significant environmental pollution challenges of its own that also hamper recovery in the Bay. The Elizabeth River's history with various industrial sites, such as dry docks, Norfolk Naval Shipyard, processing plants, and both sewage and storm water discharge contributed over time to the declining health of the river. In 1983, the EPA mentions the Elizabeth River was singled out as one of the most highly polluted bodies of water in the entire Bay watershed and as of 2011 remains one of the most polluted rivers on the United States east coast. Sediment contamination has made "toxic hot spots" within the Elizabeth River. Notably, the Southern Branch of the river at Money Point had become a 35-acre biological dead-zone with a nearly entirely lifeless river floor. Creosote (high in polycyclic aromatic hydrocarbons) from dumping and a major fire in 1963 played a major role in contaminating the river sediment there, which in some areas were as much as five feet thick.

The Commonwealth of Virginia entered into an agreement in 1995 after the Chesapeake Bay Program identified the Elizabeth River system as a "Region of Concern" in 1993. By 2003 a report entitled "State of the River 2003" by the Elizabeth River Project had been published, highlighting the sediment contamination in the Southern Branch along with other toxins including those causing cancer in some fish after a monitoring the river between 1999 and 2001. Efforts began in the 1990s and by 2003 bald eagles were returned to the watershed. 2008 saw the 3rd State Of The Elizabeth River report, prepared for the Virginia Department of Environmental Quality, which finally provided data that most of the river was not suitable for swimming. At the same time, the report showed the most positive trends for improving levels of nutrients in Virginia compared to other areas of the Chesapeake Bay. In 2009, a pilot area was dredged at Money Point, replaced with clean sand, and restored with vegetation and artificial oyster reefs and in 2010 at least 17 species of fish and shellfish were found in the former toxic site where barely any life existed previously. In 2011, dredging of the toxic sediment began, near Money Point as part of a larger initiative to help restore the Elizabeth River. Industries along the river are also voluntarily playing their part in restoring wetlands and oyster reefs in one of the largest restoration projects on the Chesapeake Bay.

== Crossings ==
Shipping has always been in competition with land-based transportation for crossings. Both activities are vital to the region.

Motor vehicles cross the main portion of the river using the Downtown Tunnel and the Midtown Tunnel. There are many other highway and railroad bridge crossings of the Eastern, Southern, and Western branches of the river of various ages and capacities, often with draw spans. The city of Chesapeake, with crossings of all three branches of the river by both railroads and highways of every type, and both bascule and swing-type draw spans, has the greatest number to contend with. In Chesapeake, the legal ownership and maintenance responsibilities are divided among the city, VDOT, and the railroads. In November 2012, the South Norfolk Jordan Bridge (SNJB) opened, a public-private partnership that allows the builder to toll for 50 years. The Bridge connects to Elm Avenue in Portsmouth and to Poindexter Street in Chesapeake. The bridge has no toll booths and relies on VDOT EZ-Pass transponders for payment or sends bills based on photography of license plates.

== See also ==
- List of Virginia rivers
- Eastern Branch Elizabeth River
- Southern Branch Elizabeth River
- Western Branch Elizabeth River
