= Midtown Tunnel (Virginia) =

Road tunnel in Virginia, United States

Coordinates: 36°51′31″N 76°18′48″W

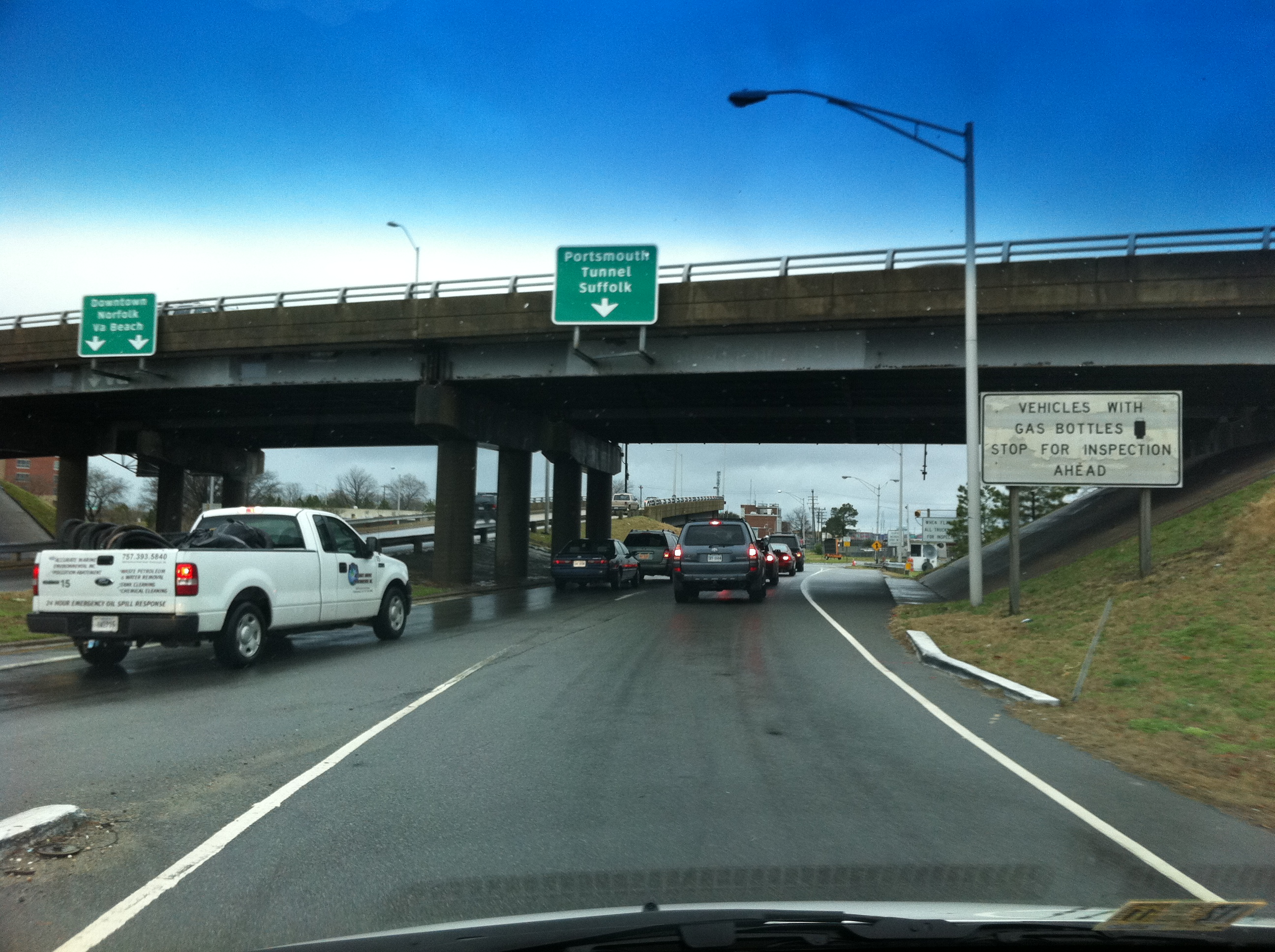
- Traffic on the Norfolk Approach to the Midtown Tunnel

Overview
- Location: Portsmouth, Virginia; Norfolk, Virginia
- Status: eastbound: open to traffic; westbound: open to traffic
- Route: US 58
- Crosses: Elizabeth River

Operation
- Opened: eastbound: 1962; westbound: 2016
- Owner: VDOT
- Operator: Elizabeth River Crossings
- Traffic: vehicle
- Toll: With E-ZPass: $1.85 off peak; $2.33 peak (Note: Peak hours are 5:30 - 9:00 am, 2:30 - 7:00 pm); Pay by Plate: $5.54 off peak; $6.02 peak
- Vehicles per day: 32,000

Technical
- No. of lanes: 4
- Operating speed: 35 miles per hour (56 km/h)
- Tunnel clearance: 13.5 ft
- Width: 8.5 feet (without permit); 11 feet (with permit)

The Midtown Tunnel carries U.S. Route 58 across the Southern Branch of the Elizabeth River in the South Hampton Roads area of Virginia, United States. It links the cities of Portsmouth and Norfolk. Owned by the Virginia Department of Transportation (VDOT), it is operated and maintained by Elizabeth River Crossings under a 58-year public–private partnership concession agreement. Formerly a toll-free facility, open road tolling was implemented on February 1, 2014 by VDOT to help finance repairs and expansion to the tunnel.

== History ==
The two-lane Midtown Tunnel was completed September 6, 1962, supplementing the Downtown Tunnel and the Berkley Bridge. It was the second fixed crossing directly between Portsmouth and Norfolk across the Elizabeth River. It was financed and built by the Elizabeth River Tunnel Commission with toll revenue bonds. In 1988 and 1989, during an expansion of I-264, the Downtown Tunnel and the Berkley Bridge were rebuilt and expanded. Tolls were also removed from the Midtown and Downtown tunnels at that time. Prior to 2007, the westbound lane of US Route 58, right before the tunnel's entry, had an HOV lane that spanned a total of 25 yards. Until its removal during construction in 2007, this lane allowed HOV traffic to merge in right at the tunnel entrance.

The need for expanded capacity at the Midtown Tunnel location has been well known and documented for decades, but developing a successful funding strategy to expand the tunnel has remained elusive over time. In 2006, the Hampton Roads Metropolitan Planning Organization (MPO) undertook a study to determine the feasibility of utilizing toll financing to support the region's high priority unfunded transportation projects, which included the Midtown Tunnel Project. This analysis concluded that the development and enhancements of the Midtown Tunnel and MLK Freeway Extension projects could be financially feasible if tolls were also collected to supplement inadequate public funds. This would include tolling the parallel Downtown Tunnel to create a congestion management plan to prevent the diversion of potential Midtown Tunnel traffic to a competing free facility.

== Issues ==
=== Congestion ===
During its first year of operation, 8,400 vehicles per day crossed through the tunnel. As port traffic expanded between Norfolk International Terminals and Portsmouth Marine Terminal during the 1980s, tunnel volumes increased year over year, reaching 40,000 vehicles per day in 2013, 3% of which is at least a truck with one trailer (as is typical of trucks leaving the port). As this number greatly exceeds its original capacity, hours of congestion are both a routine and daily occurrence at the crossing.

=== Floodgate failure ===
In September, 2003, the Midtown Tunnel was flooded and seriously damaged by Hurricane Isabel. The facility is equipped with floodgates designed for closure to protect it from flooding during extreme weather conditions such as hurricanes. As flood waters were rising during the storm, workers were unable to remove plates that were both bolted and tack-welded to the roadbed. As a result, the flood gates could not be completely closed and the tunnel filled with an estimated 44 million gallons of water. The tunnel suffered substantial electrical and mechanical damage, but was not damaged structurally. It was closed for nearly four weeks as water and sediment was pumped out, systems inspected, and essential repairs were completed. It was later determined that managers of the Virginia Department of Transportation (VDOT) had failed to adequately test the floodgates. VDOT revamped its operating procedures at all of its tunnels in the wake of the incident. Studies of additional harbor crossings have also gained additional attention since then.

== Expansion, Rehab and Elizabeth River Crossings ==
=== Public Private Partnership ===
After numerous studies and legislative attempts to fund the project publicly, Governor Bob McDonnell and VDOT in 2011 contracted with Elizabeth River Crossings (ERC) to build a new Midtown Tunnel, rehabilitate the existing Midtown Tunnel as well as the Downtown Tunnels, and extend the Martin Luther King Freeway. Under the agreement VDOT retained ownership and oversight of the tunnels, however ERC will finance, build, operate and maintain the facilities for a 58-year concession period. ERC will also assume risk of delivering the project on a performance-based, fixed-price, fixed-date contract, protecting users and taxpayers from cost overruns and delays. Funding is expected from tolls, private equity, contributions from the Commonwealth and a low-interest Federal Highway Administration loan. Operation of the tunnel system was turned over to ERC on July 12, 2012.

=== Construction and rehabilitation ===
Fabrication on the new Midtown Tunnel began in November 2012 in Sparrows Point, Maryland. The tunnel's 11 concrete elements were towed down the Chesapeake Bay to the Project site in Portsmouth for immersion and placement under the Elizabeth River. By March 2015, the first six elements were in place and production of the remaining five tunnel elements was in progress. Once the new tunnel was constructed, traffic in the existing Midtown Tunnel was converted to one-way eastbound from Portsmouth to Norfolk and the new 2-lane tunnel carried westbound traffic from Norfolk to Portsmouth. Rehabilitation work began in the existing tunnel after the new tunnel was opened. The new, westbound tunnel opened to traffic at 1:40pm EDT on June 17, 2016, with rehabilitation on the eastbound tunnel completed on September 1, 2017.

=== Tolling ===
As a part of the funding structure for the project, tolls were established by ERC. Tolls were originally scheduled to begin in late-summer 2012 (in conjunction with ERC assuming operation and maintenance duties in July 2012), however the McDonnell administration authorized a $100 million buydown suspension of the tolls until January 2014. This also gave time for a civil lawsuit to work its way to the Virginia Supreme Court who ruled on the case in November 2013, allowing tolling to begin in February 2014. It will continue through April 13, 2070.

Tolls were originally scheduled to begin at rates of $1.59/non-peak hours and $1.84/peak for cars and $4.77/non-peak and $7.34/peak for heavy vehicles. However, as part of an agreement with ERC, Governor Terry McAuliffe and VDOT agreed to pay ERC $82 million to reduce the toll rates to 75¢/off-peak and $1/peak for cars, and $1.50/off-peak and $4.00/peak heavy vehicles in 2014, with a 25¢ increase every year until the new Midtown Tunnel opens (or until the end of 2017), at which time the toll rates would then return to their originally scheduled rates.

After that, rates will increase annually by a factor equal to the greater of changes to Consumer Price Index or 3.5 percent.
