= Southern Branch Elizabeth River =

Coordinates: 36°48′34″N 76°17′24″W

Location
- Country: United States

Physical characteristics
- Source
  - location: Virginia

The Southern Branch Elizabeth River is a 14.5-mile-long (23.3 km), primarily tidal river in the U.S. state of Virginia. It flows from south to north through the city of Chesapeake and forms the boundary between the cities of Portsmouth and Chesapeake for its northernmost 3 miles (5 km). It is a tributary of the Elizabeth River, connecting to the harbor of Hampton Roads to the north. It is part of the Intracoastal Waterway of the Atlantic coast of the United States, connecting by it to the North Landing River, which flows into North Carolina.

== See also ==
- List of rivers of Virginia
- Atlantic Reserve Fleet, Norfolk
