= 1952 United States presidential election in Virginia =

- November 4, 1952

Nominee	Dwight D. Eisenhower	Adlai Stevenson
Party	Republican	Democratic
Home state	New York	Illinois
Running mate	Richard Nixon	John Sparkman
Electoral vote	12	0
Popular vote	349,037	268,677
Percentage	56.32%	43.36%
County and independent city results
Eisenhower
50–60%
60–70%
70–80%
Stevenson
40–50%
50–60%
60–70%
President before election
Harry S. Truman
Democratic
Elected President
Dwight D. Eisenhower
Republican

The 1952 United States presidential election in Virginia took place on November 4, 1952. Voters chose twelve representatives, or electors to the Electoral College, who voted for president and vice president.

For the previous five decades Virginia had almost completely disenfranchised its black and poor white populations through the use of a cumulative poll tax and literacy tests. So restricted was suffrage in this period that it has been calculated that a third of Virginia's electorate during the first half of the twentieth century comprised state employees and officeholders.

This limited electorate allowed Virginian politics to be controlled for four decades by the Byrd Organization, as progressive "antiorganization" factions were rendered impotent by the inability of almost all their potential electorate to vote. Historical fusion with the "Readjuster" Democrats, defection of substantial proportions of the Northeast-aligned white electorate of the Shenandoah Valley and Southwest Virginia over free silver, and an early move towards a "lily white" Jim Crow party meant Republicans retained a small but permanent number of legislative seats and local offices in the western part of the state. In 1928 a combination of growing middle-class Republicanism in the cities and anti-Catholicism against Al Smith in the Tidewater allowed the GOP to carry Virginia and elect three Congressmen, including one representing the local district of emerging machine leader Byrd. However, from 1932 with the state severely affected by the Depression, Republican strength declined below its low pre-1928 level, although Byrd himself became highly critical of Franklin D. Roosevelt's New Deal policies as early as 1940.

Largely because of fear of losing several seats in the House to resurgent Republicans, Virginia's federal officeholders, although all firmly opposed to Harry S. Truman's civil rights bills, did not endorse Strom Thurmond in 1948. However, Byrd became almost completely opposed to the Truman administration's policies during the ensuing presidential term, and after initially preferred nominee Richard Russell Jr. called for repealing the Taft–Hartley Act, the Byrd Organization refused to endorse any Democratic nominee, explicitly rejecting eventual nominees Illinois Governor Adlai Stevenson II and Alabama Senator John Sparkman.

== Campaign ==
Following the end of Reconstruction Virginia voted for every Democratic presidential nominee except for Al Smith in the 1928 election. U.S. Senator Harry F. Byrd opposed President Harry S. Truman's support for civil rights and chose to remain neutral in presidential elections. This allowed his political machine to support Republican presidential candidates while voting for Democratic candidates down ballot.

Following this election Virginia would support every Republican presidential nominee from 1952 to 2004 except for Lyndon B. Johnson in the 1964 election. In 2008, the state voted for Democrat Barack Obama and has since remained a Democratic-leaning state, largely due to the huge growth of Northern Virginia and the D.C. suburbs. By 2020, Joe Biden became the first Democrat to post a double-digit victory since Roosevelt himself in 1944. Virginia was the only southern state that Democratic nominee Jimmy Carter failed to win in the 1976 election.

Despite polls being uncertain, Virginia would be comfortably won by Republican nominees, Columbia University President Dwight D. Eisenhower, running with California Senator Richard Nixon.

=== Polls ===
Source	Rating	As of
Lansing State Journal	Tossup	September 17, 1952
The Salt Lake Tribune	Tilt D	October 24, 1952
Lubbock Morning Avalanche	Tossup	October 24, 1952
The Greeneville Sun	Lean D	October 25, 1952
The New York Times	Lean R (flip)	October 25, 1952
The Modesto Bee	Lean R (flip)	October 27, 1952
work=The New York Times	Lean D	October 27, 1952

== Results ==
1952 United States presidential election in Virginia
Party	Candidate	Votes	Percentage	Electoral votes
Republican	Dwight Eisenhower	349,037	56.32%	12
Democratic	Adlai Stevenson	268,677	43.36%	0
Socialist Labor	Eric Hass	1,160	0.19%	0
Social Democrat	Darlington Hoopes	504	0.08%	0
Progressive	Vincent Hallinan	311	0.05%	0
Totals		619,689	100.00%	12

=== Results by county or independent city ===
County or city	Dwight D. Eisenhower Republican		Adlai Stevenson Democratic		Eric Hass Socialist Labor		Darlington Hoopes Social Democrat		Vincent Hallinan Progressive		Margin		Total votes cast
County or city	#	%	#	%	#	%	#	%	#	%	#	%	Total votes cast
Accomack	2,626	53.99%	2,220	45.64%	12	0.25%	4	0.08%	2	0.04%	406	8.35%	4,864
Albemarle	2,523	60.32%	1,642	39.25%	8	0.19%	8	0.19%	2	0.05%	881	21.07%	4,183
Alexandria	8,579	56.92%	6,471	42.93%	8	0.15%	3	0.06%	1	0.02%	2,108	13.99%	15,072
Alleghany	2,564	52.88%	2,274	46.90%	7	0.14%	2	0.04%	2	0.04%	290	5.98%	4,849
Amelia	832	53.64%	703	45.33%	8	0.52%	5	0.32%	3	0.19%	129	8.31%	1,551
Amherst	1,407	40.20%	2,078	59.37%	11	0.31%	3	0.09%	1	0.03%	-671	-19.17%	3,500
Appomattox	929	49.13%	957	50.61%	3	0.16%	2	0.11%	0	0.00%	-28	-1.48%	1,891
Arlington	22,158	60.91%	14,032	38.57%	157	0.43%	5	0.01%	28	0.08%	8,126	22.34%	36,380
Augusta	3,414	69.97%	1,453	29.78%	6	0.15%	2	0.05%	4	0.10%	1,961	40.19%	4,879
Bath	765	62.65%	451	36.94%	2	0.16%	3	0.25%	0	0.00%	314	25.71%	1,221
Bedford	2,916	54.47%	2,426	45.32%	4	0.07%	5	0.09%	2	0.04%	490	9.15%	5,353
Bland	1,000	57.21%	743	42.51%	2	0.11%	1	0.06%	2	0.11%	257	14.70%	1,748
Botetourt	2,021	61.50%	1,264	38.47%	1	0.03%	0	0.00%	0	0.00%	757	23.03%	3,286
Bristol	1,574	52.31%	1,432	47.59%	12	0.45%	8	0.30%	0	0.00%	142	4.72%	3,009
Brunswick	1,098	39.97%	1,635	59.52%	5	0.18%	9	0.33%	0	0.00%	-537	-19.55%	2,747
Buchanan	2,330	38.65%	3,613	59.93%	69	1.14%	11	0.18%	6	0.10%	-1,283	-21.28%	6,029
Buckingham	811	46.58%	919	52.79%	5	0.29%	4	0.23%	2	0.11%	-108	-6.21%	1,741
Buena Vista	513	56.62%	392	43.27%	9	0.06%	7	0.05%	6	0.04%	121	13.35%	906
Campbell	2,447	47.26%	2,713	52.39%	14	0.27%	2	0.04%	2	0.04%	-266	-5.13%	5,178
Caroline	858	47.01%	954	52.27%	12	0.66%	1	0.05%	0	0.00%	-96	-5.26%	1,825
Carroll	3,774	68.68%	1,711	31.14%	7	0.13%	1	0.02%	2	0.04%	2,063	37.54%	5,495
Charles City	342	40.24%	492	57.88%	8	0.94%	5	0.59%	3	0.35%	-150	-17.64%	850
Charlotte	949	36.56%	1,630	62.79%	8	0.31%	7	0.27%	2	0.08%	-681	-26.23%	2,596
Charlottesville	3,292	60.14%	2,174	39.72%	1	0.03%	2	0.07%	0	0.00%	1,118	20.42%	5,474
Chesterfield	4,482	55.70%	3,546	44.07%	9	0.11%	5	0.06%	4	0.05%	936	11.63%	8,046
Clarke	809	52.88%	716	46.80%	4	0.26%	1	0.07%	0	0.00%	93	6.08%	1,530
Clifton Forge	936	53.46%	811	46.32%	1	0.11%	0	0.00%	0	0.00%	125	7.14%	1,751
Colonial Heights	896	51.73%	835	48.21%	2	0.04%	5	0.09%	1	0.02%	61	3.52%	1,732
Craig	425	46.45%	490	53.55%	0	0.00%	0	0.00%	0	0.00%	-65	-7.10%	915
Culpeper	1,507	60.33%	987	39.51%	1	0.04%	2	0.08%	1	0.04%	520	20.82%	2,498
Cumberland	695	54.42%	574	44.95%	3	0.23%	5	0.39%	0	0.00%	121	9.47%	1,277
Danville	4,765	58.49%	3,323	40.79%	3	0.17%	1	0.06%	0	0.00%	1,442	17.70%	8,146
Dickenson	2,913	47.41%	3,210	52.25%	17	0.28%	3	0.05%	1	0.02%	-297	-4.84%	6,144
Dinwiddie	983	39.77%	1,462	59.14%	11	0.44%	11	0.44%	5	0.20%	-479	-19.37%	2,472
Essex	610	52.45%	545	46.86%	6	0.52%	2	0.17%	0	0.00%	65	5.59%	1,163
Fairfax	13,020	60.90%	8,329	38.96%	7	0.03%	7	0.03%	16	0.07%	4,691	21.94%	21,379
Falls Church	1,386	59.82%	930	40.14%	1	0.06%	0	0.00%	0	0.00%	456	19.68%	2,317
Fauquier	2,068	56.27%	1,597	43.46%	8	0.22%	2	0.05%	0	0.00%	471	12.81%	3,675
Floyd	1,626	71.69%	619	27.29%	17	0.75%	2	0.09%	4	0.18%	1,007	44.40%	2,268
Fluvanna	724	57.74%	519	41.39%	5	0.40%	5	0.40%	1	0.08%	205	16.35%	1,254
Franklin	1,976	49.08%	2,012	49.98%	13	0.32%	20	0.50%	5	0.12%	-36	-0.90%	4,026
Frederick	1,803	57.53%	1,326	42.31%	4	0.13%	1	0.03%	0	0.00%	477	15.22%	3,134
Fredericksburg	1,536	61.20%	970	38.65%	26	0.32%	26	0.32%	6	0.07%	566	22.55%	2,510
Giles	1,935	52.94%	1,717	46.98%	3	0.08%	0	0.00%	0	0.00%	218	5.96%	3,655
Gloucester	1,073	52.44%	961	46.97%	6	0.29%	4	0.20%	2	0.10%	112	5.47%	2,046
Goochland	714	46.12%	820	52.97%	10	0.65%	4	0.26%	0	0.00%	-106	-6.85%	1,548
Grayson	4,449	61.78%	2,734	37.97%	10	0.14%	5	0.07%	3	0.04%	1,715	23.81%	7,201
Greene	537	67.80%	250	31.57%	3	0.38%	2	0.25%	0	0.00%	287	36.23%	792
Greensville	988	43.47%	1,259	55.39%	15	0.66%	6	0.26%	5	0.22%	-271	-11.92%	2,273
Halifax	2,274	40.70%	3,296	58.99%	10	0.18%	6	0.11%	1	0.02%	-1,022	-18.29%	5,587
Hampton	5,505	52.52%	4,946	47.19%	1	0.04%	0	0.00%	0	0.00%	559	5.33%	10,481
Hanover	2,257	59.76%	1,518	40.19%	2	0.05%	0	0.00%	0	0.00%	739	19.57%	3,777
Harrisonburg	2,238	77.82%	635	22.08%	2	0.08%	2	0.08%	0	0.00%	1,603	55.74%	2,876
Henrico	10,682	66.62%	5,339	33.30%	4	0.02%	7	0.04%	3	0.02%	5,343	33.32%	16,035
Henry	1,871	44.34%	2,323	55.05%	17	0.40%	8	0.19%	1	0.02%	-452	-10.71%	4,220
Highland	696	62.25%	419	37.48%	2	0.18%	1	0.09%	0	0.00%	277	24.77%	1,118
Hopewell	1,640	49.58%	1,657	50.09%	15	0.14%	9	0.09%	6	0.06%	-17	-0.51%	3,308
Isle of Wight	996	44.52%	1,227	54.85%	9	0.40%	4	0.18%	1	0.04%	-231	-10.33%	2,237
James City	527	60.23%	346	39.54%	2	0.23%	0	0.00%	0	0.00%	181	20.69%	875
King and Queen	415	51.23%	387	47.78%	3	0.37%	3	0.37%	2	0.25%	28	3.45%	810
King George	577	52.94%	503	46.15%	5	0.46%	3	0.28%	2	0.18%	74	6.79%	1,090
King William	730	57.39%	533	41.90%	7	0.55%	2	0.16%	0	0.00%	197	15.49%	1,272
Lancaster	1,228	61.49%	753	37.71%	10	0.50%	6	0.30%	0	0.00%	475	23.78%	1,997
Lee	4,622	51.99%	4,242	47.71%	16	0.18%	4	0.04%	7	0.08%	380	4.28%	8,891
Loudoun	2,540	54.86%	2,075	44.82%	9	0.19%	3	0.06%	3	0.06%	465	10.04%	4,630
Louisa	1,135	52.26%	1,025	47.19%	6	0.28%	4	0.18%	2	0.09%	110	5.07%	2,172
Lunenburg	837	35.27%	1,528	64.39%	4	0.17%	3	0.13%	1	0.04%	-691	-29.12%	2,373
Lynchburg	7,090	64.75%	3,848	35.14%	2	0.07%	1	0.03%	0	0.00%	3,242	29.61%	10,949
Madison	1,012	64.96%	540	34.66%	3	0.19%	1	0.06%	2	0.13%	472	30.30%	1,558
Martinsville	1,772	55.83%	1,391	43.82%	5	0.15%	3	0.09%	3	0.09%	381	12.01%	3,174
Mathews	951	63.87%	533	35.80%	4	0.27%	1	0.07%	0	0.00%	418	28.07%	1,489
Mecklenburg	1,891	42.46%	2,525	56.69%	20	0.45%	15	0.34%	3	0.07%	-634	-14.23%	4,454
Middlesex	705	57.74%	507	41.52%	5	0.41%	3	0.25%	1	0.08%	198	16.22%	1,221
Montgomery	3,881	70.68%	1,600	29.14%	7	0.13%	2	0.04%	1	0.02%	2,281	41.54%	5,491
Nansemond	1,168	32.87%	2,360	66.42%	12	0.34%	12	0.34%	1	0.03%	-1,192	-33.55%	3,553
Nelson	740	37.56%	1,222	62.03%	5	0.25%	2	0.10%	1	0.05%	-482	-24.47%	1,970
New Kent	455	52.78%	400	46.40%	5	0.58%	1	0.12%	1	0.12%	55	6.38%	862
Newport News	2,769	40.46%	4,051	59.20%	6	0.05%	2	0.02%	3	0.03%	-1,282	-18.74%	6,843
Norfolk	5,614	45.30%	6,766	54.60%	8	0.06%	3	0.02%	1	0.01%	-1,152	-9.30%	12,392
Norfolk City	14,166	54.33%	11,862	45.49%	6	0.19%	3	0.09%	2	0.06%	2,304	8.84%	26,074
Northampton	1,307	50.12%	1,289	49.42%	6	0.23%	6	0.23%	0	0.00%	18	0.70%	2,608
Northumberland	1,230	68.11%	573	31.73%	1	0.06%	1	0.06%	1	0.06%	657	36.38%	1,806
Nottoway	1,454	51.02%	1,381	48.46%	7	0.25%	4	0.14%	4	0.14%	73	2.56%	2,850
Orange	1,525	62.17%	916	37.34%	5	0.20%	5	0.20%	2	0.08%	609	24.83%	2,453
Page	2,649	64.59%	1,441	35.14%	10	0.24%	1	0.02%	0	0.00%	1,208	29.45%	4,101
Patrick	1,314	45.75%	1,554	54.11%	4	0.14%	0	0.00%	0	0.00%	-240	-8.36%	2,872
Petersburg	2,822	54.49%	2,342	45.22%	12	0.18%	5	0.07%	6	0.09%	480	9.27%	5,179
Pittsylvania	2,893	41.93%	3,976	57.62%	16	0.23%	10	0.14%	5	0.07%	-1,083	-15.69%	6,900
Portsmouth	3,621	36.74%	6,188	62.79%	16	0.06%	13	0.05%	17	0.07%	-2,567	-26.05%	9,855
Powhatan	558	52.49%	498	46.85%	29	0.29%	10	0.10%	7	0.07%	60	5.64%	1,063
Prince Edward	1,359	59.34%	926	40.44%	4	0.38%	1	0.09%	2	0.19%	433	18.90%	2,290
Prince George	541	46.40%	612	52.49%	2	0.09%	2	0.09%	1	0.04%	-71	-6.09%	1,166
Prince William	1,619	49.14%	1,653	50.17%	11	0.94%	2	0.17%	0	0.00%	-34	-1.03%	3,295
Princess Anne	3,180	51.04%	3,037	48.75%	14	0.42%	3	0.09%	6	0.18%	143	2.29%	6,230
Pulaski	2,815	62.03%	1,715	37.79%	4	0.06%	5	0.08%	4	0.06%	1,100	24.24%	4,538
Radford	1,523	57.73%	1,108	42.00%	9	0.17%	5	0.10%	1	0.02%	415	15.73%	2,638
Rappahannock	619	54.35%	518	45.48%	6	0.13%	1	0.02%	1	0.02%	101	8.87%	1,139
Richmond	727	68.91%	326	30.90%	2	0.18%	0	0.00%	0	0.00%	401	38.01%	1,055
Richmond City	29,300	60.28%	19,235	39.57%	1	0.04%	4	0.15%	2	0.08%	10,065	20.71%	48,610
Roanoke	6,017	68.95%	2,689	30.82%	1	0.09%	1	0.09%	0	0.00%	3,328	38.13%	8,726
Roanoke City	15,673	66.00%	8,042	33.87%	31	0.06%	22	0.05%	22	0.05%	7,631	32.13%	23,747
Rockbridge	2,068	65.90%	1,059	33.75%	9	0.10%	5	0.06%	6	0.07%	1,009	32.15%	3,138
Rockingham	4,350	73.11%	1,591	26.74%	9	0.29%	1	0.03%	1	0.03%	2,759	46.37%	5,950
Russell	2,937	47.33%	3,253	52.42%	4	0.07%	3	0.05%	2	0.03%	-316	-5.09%	6,206
Scott	4,703	61.13%	2,990	38.87%	11	0.18%	3	0.05%	2	0.03%	1,713	22.26%	7,693
Shenandoah	4,284	71.12%	1,734	28.78%	0	0.00%	0	0.00%	0	0.00%	2,550	42.34%	6,024
Smyth	3,694	64.98%	1,972	34.69%	3	0.05%	2	0.03%	1	0.02%	1,722	30.29%	5,685
South Norfolk	1,098	37.90%	1,782	61.51%	14	0.06%	7	0.03%	11	0.05%	-684	-23.61%	2,897
Southampton	1,166	36.70%	2,000	62.95%	15	0.26%	2	0.04%	2	0.04%	-834	-26.25%	3,177
Spotsylvania	1,174	48.98%	1,194	49.81%	11	0.38%	3	0.10%	3	0.10%	-20	-0.83%	2,397
Stafford	1,411	56.35%	1,077	43.01%	5	0.16%	4	0.13%	2	0.06%	334	13.34%	2,504
Staunton	2,578	73.07%	945	26.79%	4	0.11%	1	0.03%	0	0.00%	1,633	46.28%	3,528
Suffolk	1,622	57.17%	1,209	42.62%	2	0.07%	3	0.11%	1	0.04%	413	14.55%	2,837
Surry	414	41.15%	572	56.86%	21	0.88%	5	0.21%	3	0.13%	-158	-15.71%	1,006
Sussex	888	47.97%	956	51.65%	9	0.36%	4	0.16%	3	0.12%	-68	-3.68%	1,851
Tazewell	3,232	55.83%	2,527	43.65%	9	0.89%	11	1.09%	0	0.00%	705	12.18%	5,789
Virginia Beach	1,310	59.79%	881	40.21%	0	0.00%	0	0.00%	0	0.00%	429	19.58%	2,191
Warren	1,888	57.90%	1,362	41.77%	5	0.27%	1	0.05%	1	0.05%	526	16.13%	3,261
Warwick	3,307	54.00%	2,806	45.82%	3	0.05%	5	0.08%	3	0.05%	501	8.18%	6,124
Washington	3,810	57.74%	2,778	42.10%	22	0.38%	3	0.05%	5	0.09%	1,032	15.64%	6,599
Waynesboro	1,680	69.62%	730	30.25%	2	0.08%	1	0.04%	0	0.00%	950	39.37%	2,413
Westmoreland	1,117	59.51%	754	40.17%	8	0.25%	3	0.09%	0	0.00%	363	19.34%	1,877
Williamsburg	797	62.12%	483	37.65%	1	0.08%	2	0.16%	0	0.00%	314	24.47%	1,283
Winchester	2,375	69.20%	1,055	30.74%	1	0.03%	1	0.03%	0	0.00%	1,320	38.46%	3,432
Wise	3,911	45.16%	4,729	54.61%	10	0.15%	1	0.02%	0	0.00%	-818	-9.45%	8,660
Wythe	3,580	68.24%	1,654	31.53%	4	0.21%	2	0.11%	0	0.00%	1,926	36.71%	5,246
York	1,335	50.53%	1,287	48.71%	14	0.16%	4	0.05%	2	0.02%	48	1.82%	2,642
Totals	349,037	56.32%	268,677	43.36%	1,160	0.19%	504	0.08%	311	0.05%	80,360	12.96%	619,689

==== Counties and independent cities that flipped from Democratic to Republican ====
- Accomack
- Albemarle
- Alleghany
- Amelia
- Alexandria
- Bedford
- Bristol
- Buena Vista
- Charlottesville
- Clarke
- Clifton Forge
- Culpeper
- Cumberland
- Danville
- Fauquier
- Essex
- Frederick
- Fluvanna
- Giles
- Gloucester
- Fredericksburg
- Hanover
- Henrico
- Hampton
- James City
- Lancaster
- Loudoun
- King William
- Louisa
- Lynchburg
- Martinsville
- Middlesex
- New Kent
- Norfolk
- Northampton
- Nottoway
- Orange
- Petersburg
- Powhatan
- Prince Edward
- Princess Anne
- Rappahannock
- Richmond
- Suffolk
- Warren
- Waynesboro
- York

==== Counties and independent cities that flipped from Dixiecrat to Democratic ====
- Halifax

== Analysis ==
Eisenhower won Virginia by a 12.97 point margin, making this the first time Virginia voted for a Republican since it was won by Herbert Hoover in 1928, and the best Republican performance in Virginia to this point. Virginia was Eisenhower's strongest state in the old Confederacy, marking a shift from Virginia being previously regarded as a safe blue state to more of a red state. Eisenhower ultimately won the national election with 55.18 percent of the vote, making Virginia two points more Republican than the nation at-large. This was the first occasion any Confederate State voted more Republican than the nation since Virginia itself in 1888 voted 0.30 points more Republican while its blacks remained enfranchised and large numbers of white Readjusters had joined the GOP.

The key to Eisenhower's win was gains from the large in-migration to Northern Virginia, where the many new voters were not tied to the Democratic Party as Virginia's older generation was, with the result that Eisenhower gained four-fifths of approximately two hundred thousand new voters since 1948. Like the rest of the former Confederacy, Eisenhower also gained from transfer of 1948 Thurmond votes and from increasing upper-class Republican voting in cites such as Richmond. Nevertheless, the basis of Republican strength remained the old Readjuster and pro-gold standard regions of the Shenandoah Valley and Southwest Virginia.

This was also the first election after Colonial Heights was incorporated as an independent city. Eisenhower won Colonial Heights by a close margin of roughly three points. In the decades since, Colonial Heights has established itself as one of the most Republican-leaning independent cities in Virginia, and has yet to be won by a Democratic presidential candidate. Eisenhower's 1952 and 1956 victories in Colonial Heights of three points and four points remain the two lowest margins of victory for a Republican presidential candidate as of the 2024 election.

== See also ==
- United States presidential elections in Virginia

== Works cited ==
- Moreland, Laurence; Steed, Robert; Baker, Tod, eds. (1991). The 1988 Presidential Election in the South: Continuity Amidst Change in Southern Party Politics. Praeger Publishers. ISBN 0275931455.
