= VA240 =

VA240 may refer to:

- Ariane flight VA240, an Ariane 5 launch that occurred on 12 December 2017
- Virgin Australia flight 240, with IATA flight number VA240
- Virginia State Route 240 (VA-240), a primary state highway in the United States
