= Virginia State Route 239 =

State highway in the City of Portsmouth, Virginia, US

State Route 239
- Victory Boulevard

Route information
- Maintained by VDOT
- Length: 4.46 mi (7.18 km)
- Existed: late 1960s–present

Major junctions
- West end: SR 337 in Portsmouth
- US 58 / US 460 Alt. in Portsmouth; I-264 in Portsmouth; US 17 in Portsmouth
- East end: SR 337 in Portsmouth

Location
- Country: United States
- State: Virginia
- Counties: City of Portsmouth

Highway system
- Virginia Routes; Interstate; US; Primary; Secondary; Byways; History; HOT lanes
← SR 238	→ SR 240

State Route 239 (SR 239) is a primary state highway in the U.S. state of Virginia. Known as Victory Boulevard, the state highway runs 4.46 miles (7.18 km) between intersections with SR 337 in the independent city of Portsmouth. SR 239 connects U.S. Route 58 (US 58) and Interstate 264 (I-264) in the western part of Portsmouth with US 17 in the southern part of the city.

== Route description ==
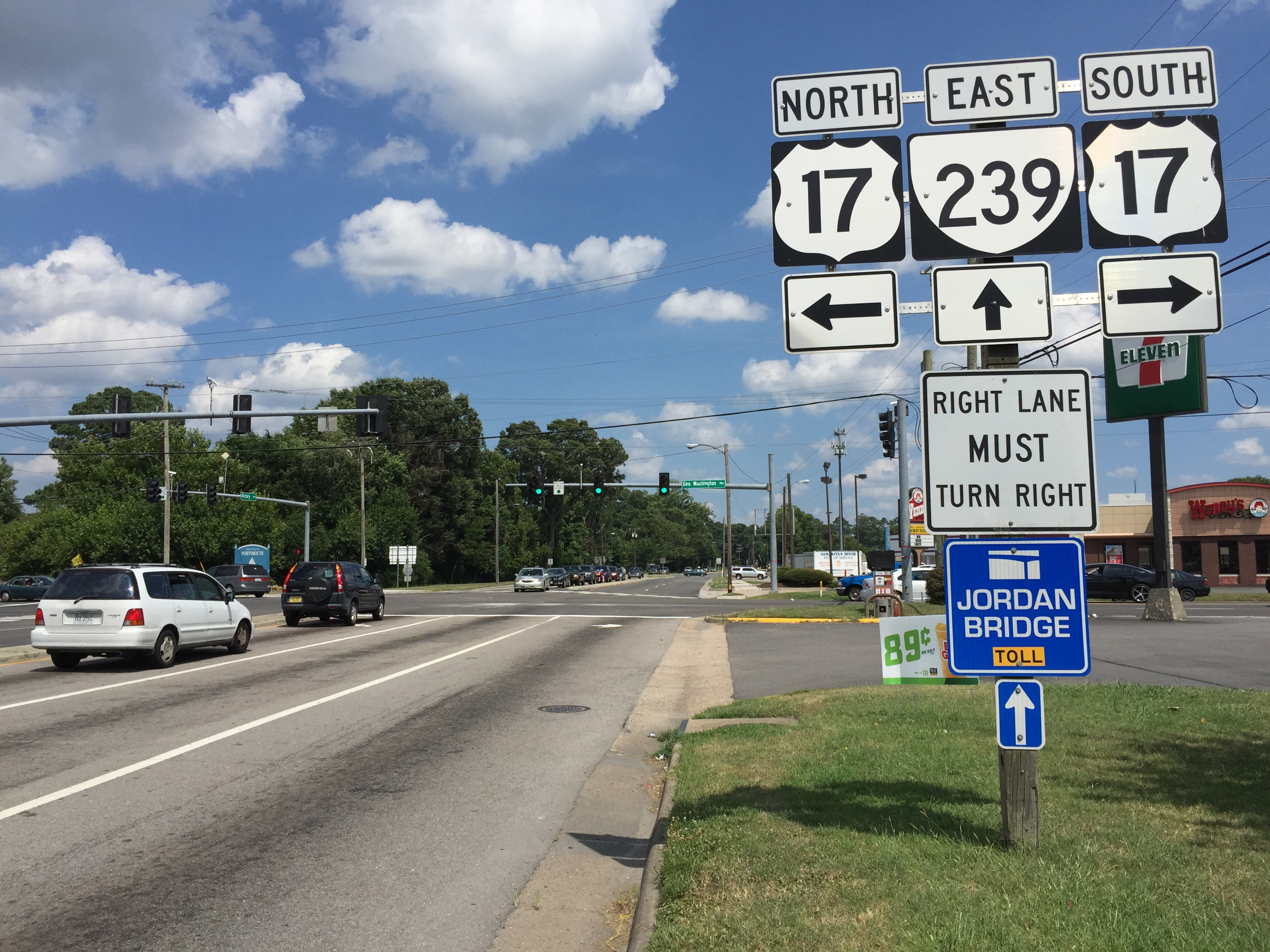
View east along SR 239 at US 17 in Portsmouth

SR 239 begins at an intersection with SR 337 (Portsmouth Boulevard) in the western part of Portsmouth. The state highway heads south as a four-lane divided highway and intersects US 58 and US 460 Alternate, which follow Airline Boulevard. Immediately south of Airline Boulevard, SR 239 has a grade crossing of a Norfolk Southern Railway rail line. The state highway continues south through a diamond interchange with I-264. SR 239 passes to the west of the Portsmouth campus of Tidewater Community College and Bide-A-Wee Golf Course as it curves to the east. The state highway intersects US 17 (George Washington Highway), then briefly parallels Norfolk Southern's Norfolk District rail line, which forms the boundary between the independent cities of Portsmouth and Chesapeake. SR 239 veers north and crosses Paradise Creek to enter the Norfolk Naval Shipyard, where the highway reaches its eastern terminus at SR 337 (Elm Avenue) west of the Jordan Bridge. The roadway continues north as Williams Avenue through the heart of the U.S. Navy shipyard.

== Major intersections ==
The entire route is in Portsmouth.

mi	km	Destinations	Notes
0.00	0.00	SR 337 (Portsmouth Boulevard)	Western terminus
0.22	0.35	US 58 / US 460 Alt. (Airline Boulevard)	
0.55	0.89	I-264 – Bowers Hill	Exit 3 (I-264)
2.66	4.28	US 17 (George Washington Highway)	
4.46	7.18	SR 337	Eastern terminus
1.000 mi = 1.609 km; 1.000 km = 0.621 mi
