= Virginia State Route 337 Alternate (Portsmouth) =

State highway in Virginia, United States

State Route 337 Alternate

Route information
- Maintained by VDOT
- Length: 2.29 mi (3.69 km)
- Existed: 1968–present

Major junctions
- West end: US 460 Alt. / SR 337 in Portsmouth
- East end: US 58 / SR 141 in Portsmouth

Location
- Country: United States
- State: Virginia

Highway system
- Virginia Routes; Interstate; US; Primary; Secondary; Byways; History; HOT lanes

State Route 337 Alternate (SR 337 Alternate) is a primary state highway in the U.S. state of Virginia, lying entirely within the city of Portsmouth. It is an alternate route of SR 337, but only intersects SR 337 at its west end.

== Route description ==
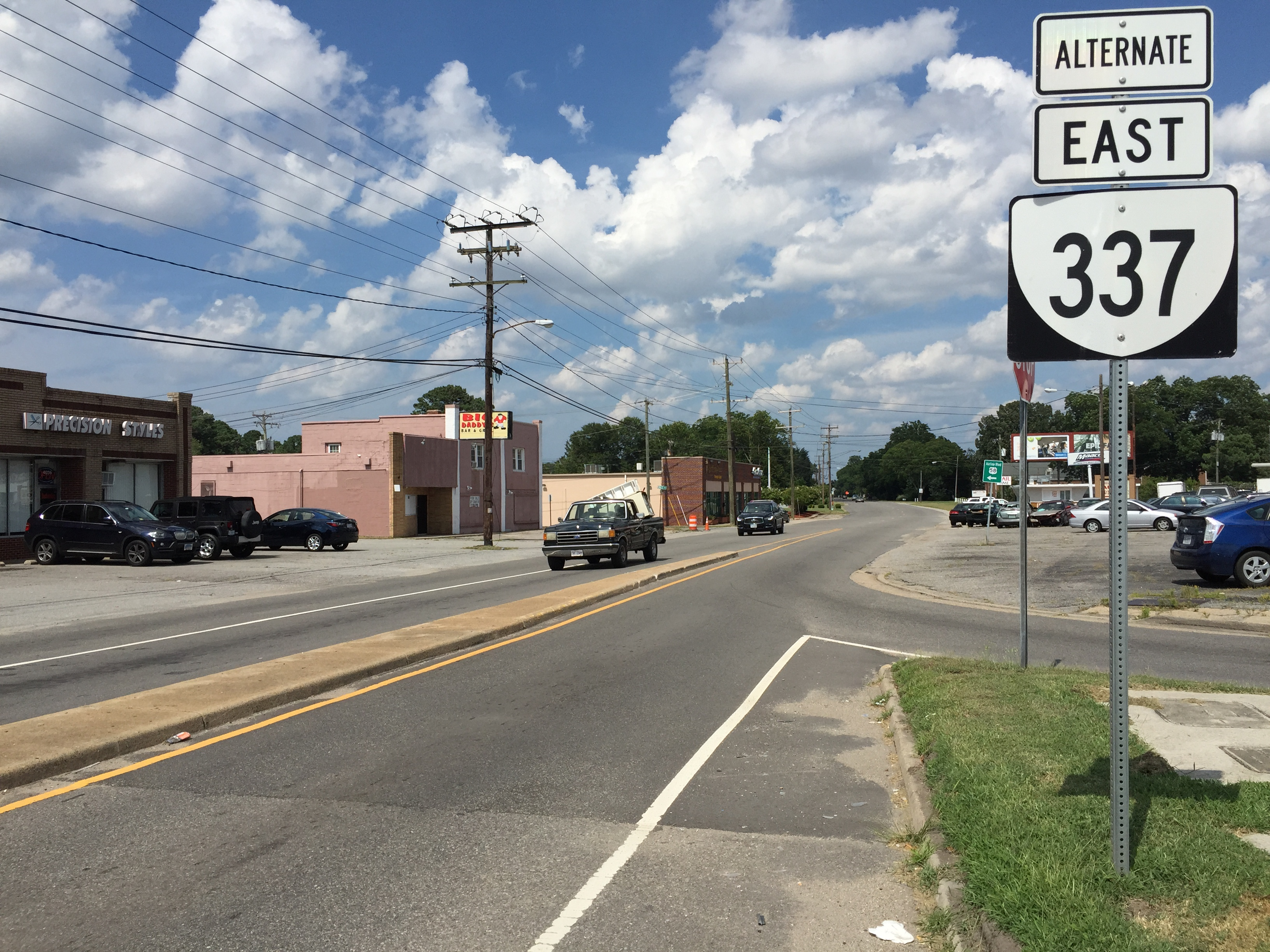
View east at the west end of SR 337 Alt. at SR 337 in Portsmouth

SR 337 Alternate begins at the intersection of Portsmouth Boulevard (US 460 Alternate/SR 337) and Turnpike Road, and runs northeast on Turnpike Road. It turns north on Harbor Drive and ends at the London Boulevard overpass, where US 58 joins and the Martin Luther King Jr. Freeway begins. The route does not return to SR 337, but continuing along US 58 via the freeway and through the Midtown Tunnel will take one back to SR 337 in Norfolk.

== History ==
Turnpike Road and most of SR 337 Alternate was initially part of SR 10, defined in 1918. That route came from Suffolk on Portsmouth Boulevard, turned northeast on Turnpike Road, north on Constitution Avenue (then Sixth Avenue), and east on High Street to reach the Norfolk-Portsmouth Ferry. It was defined as a state highway through Portsmouth in 1932, to be maintained by Portsmouth with aid from Virginia under Chapter 415, Acts of 1932. The road became US 117 in 1926, and US 58 was added in 1932. The present Airline Boulevard was built by Virginia as part of SR 12. When it was completed in the mid-1930s, US 58 was moved to it, and the old route along Turnpike Road and Constitution Avenue became State Route 287. SR 287 was renumbered as US 58 Alternate in the early 1940s. In 1968, US 58 Alternate was renumbered to SR 337 Alternate. It was truncated slightly at its west end from Airline Boulevard (US 58) to Portsmouth Boulevard, and the east end was realigned, using Harbor Drive rather than Constitution Avenue, and ending several blocks north of High Street (US 58 until 1962).

== Major intersections ==
The entire route is in Portsmouth.

mi	km	Destinations	Notes
0.00	0.00	US 460 Alt. / SR 337 (Portsmouth Boulevard)	
1.05	1.69	US 17 (Frederick Boulvevard)	
		High Street to I-264 / US 58 west	former US 58
2.29	3.69	US 58 east	Interchange
1.000 mi = 1.609 km; 1.000 km = 0.621 mi
