= Virginia State Route 240 =

State highway in Albemarle County, Virginia, US

State Route 240
- SR 240 highlighted in red

Route information
- Maintained by VDOT
- Length: 4.51 mi (7.26 km)
- Existed: 1942–present

Major junctions
- West end: US 250 / SR 635 in Brownsville
- East end: US 250 / SR 680 near Ivy

Location
- Country: United States
- State: Virginia
- Counties: Albemarle

Highway system
- Virginia Routes; Interstate; US; Primary; Secondary; Byways; History; HOT lanes
← SR 239	→ SR 241

State Route 240 (SR 240) is a primary state highway in the U.S. state of Virginia. The state highway runs 4.51 miles (7.26 km) between junctions with U.S. Route 250 (US 250) in Brownsville and near Ivy. SR 240 is an L-shaped route that forms the old alignment of US 250 through Crozet in western Albemarle County.

== Route description ==
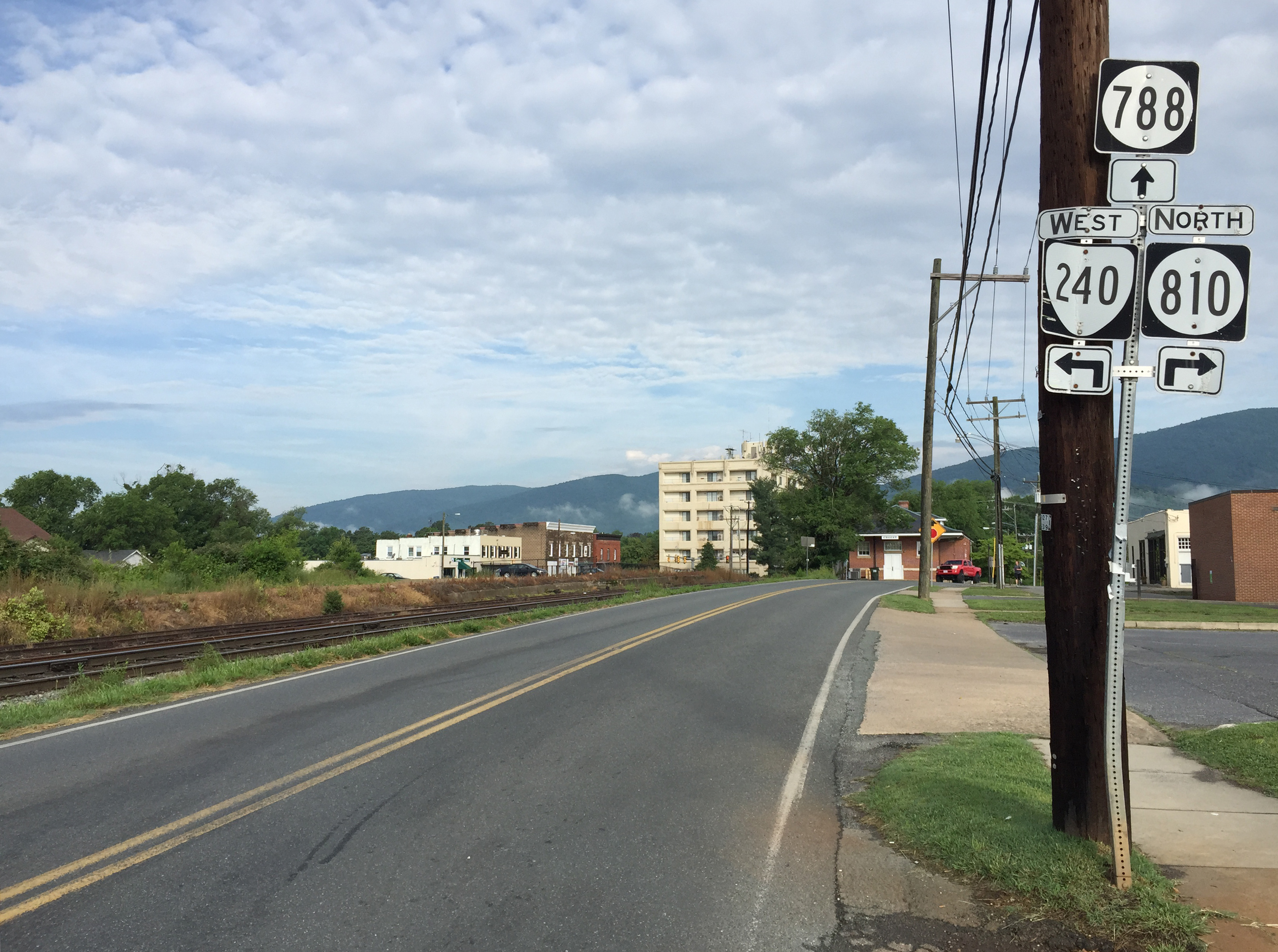
View west along SR 240 entering central Crozet at SR 788 and SR 810

SR 240 begins at an intersection with US 250 (Rockfish Gap Turnpike) in Brownsville. The state highway heads north as two-lane undivided Crozet Avenue into the unincorporated town of Crozet. SR 240 passes under CSX's North Mountain Subdivision and immediately reaches a four-way intersection with SR 788 (Railroad Avenue) and SR 810, on which Crozet Avenue continues north. SR 240 turns east onto Three Notchd Road. The state highway closely parallels the railroad for a short distance, then veers away and does not approach the rail line again until its eastern terminus at US 250 just west of the Mechums River west of Ivy. US 250 heads southwest as Rockfish Gap Turnpike and east as Ivy Road toward Charlottesville.

== Major intersections ==
The entire route is in Albemarle County.

Location	mi	km	Destinations	Notes
Brownsville	0.00	0.00	US 250 (Rockfish Gap Turnpike) / SR 635 (Miller School Road) to I-64 – Batesville, Charlottesville, Waynesboro	Western terminus; former planned SR 230 south
Crozet	1.20– 1.23	1.93– 1.98	SR 691 (Jarmans Gap Road / Tabor Street) – Claudius Crozet Park	Short concurrency with SR 691 between Jarmans Gap Road and Tabor Street
Crozet	1.40	2.25	SR 788 (Railroad Avenue) / SR 810 north (Crozet Avenue) – White Hall, Mint Springs Valley Park	Southern terminus of SR 810; former SR 230 north
Mechums River	4.51	7.26	US 250 (Ivy Road / Rockfish Gap Turnpike) / SR 680 (Browns Gap Turnpike) to I-64 – Charlottesville, Richmond, Waynesboro, Beaver Creek Lake	Eastern terminus
1.000 mi = 1.609 km; 1.000 km = 0.621 mi
