= 1936 United States presidential election in Virginia =

- November 3, 1936

Nominee	Franklin D. Roosevelt	Alf Landon
Party	Democratic	Republican
Home state	New York	Kansas
Running mate	John N. Garner	Frank Knox
Electoral vote	11	0
Popular vote	234,980	98,336
Percentage	70.23%	29.39%
County and independent city results
Roosevelt
50–60%
60–70%
70–80%
80–90%
90–100%
Landon
40–50%
50–60%
60–70%
President before election
Franklin D. Roosevelt
Democratic
Elected President
Franklin D. Roosevelt
Democratic

The 1936 United States presidential election in Virginia took place on November 3, 1936. Voters chose 11 representatives, or electors, to the Electoral College, who voted for president and vice president.

Virginia voted for the Democratic nominee, incumbent President Franklin D. Roosevelt, over the Republican nominee, Kansas Governor Alf Landon. Roosevelt ultimately won the national election with 60.80% of the vote. Roosevelt carried Virginia with the largest percentage since 1832, and no candidate since has been able to match his performance in the state.

== Results ==
1936 United States presidential election in Virginia
Party	Candidate	Votes	Percentage	Electoral votes
Democratic	Franklin D. Roosevelt (inc.)	234,980	70.23%	11
Republican	Alf Landon	98,336	29.39%	0
Prohibition	D. Leigh Colvin	594	0.18%	0
Socialist	Norman Thomas	313	0.09%	0
Union	William Lemke	233	0.07%	0
Communist	Earl Browder	98	0.03%	0
Socialist Labor	John W. Aiken	36	0.01%	0
Totals		334,590	100.00%	11
Voter turnout (voting age)				25.7%

=== Results by county ===
County or independent city	Franklin D. Roosevelt Democratic		Alf Landon Republican		Other candidates Various parties		Margin		Total votes cast
County or independent city	#	%	#	%	#	%	#	%	Total votes cast
Accomack County	1,583	70.08%	670	29.66%	6	0.27%	913	40.42%	2,259
Albemarle County	1,825	73.98%	635	25.74%	7	0.28%	1,190	48.24%	2,467
Alleghany County	2,013	60.18%	1,319	39.43%	13	0.39%	694	20.75%	3,345
Amelia County	753	75.53%	239	23.97%	5	0.50%	514	51.55%	997
Amherst County	1,734	87.75%	236	11.94%	6	0.30%	1,498	75.81%	1,976
Appomattox County	1,375	86.64%	204	12.85%	8	0.50%	1,171	73.79%	1,587
Arlington County	4,971	63.45%	2,825	36.06%	39	0.50%	2,146	27.39%	7,835
Augusta County	2,872	62.83%	1,668	36.49%	31	0.68%	1,204	26.34%	4,571
Bath County	614	54.34%	514	45.49%	2	0.18%	100	8.85%	1,130
Bedford County	2,276	78.32%	619	21.30%	11	0.38%	1,657	57.02%	2,906
Bland County	778	54.60%	642	45.05%	5	0.35%	136	9.54%	1,425
Botetourt County	1,544	53.22%	1,343	46.29%	14	0.48%	201	6.93%	2,901
Brunswick County	1,303	95.46%	60	4.40%	2	0.15%	1,243	91.06%	1,365
Buchanan County	1,886	69.88%	808	29.94%	5	0.19%	1,078	39.94%	2,699
Buckingham County	945	77.46%	273	22.38%	2	0.16%	672	55.08%	1,220
Campbell County	1,987	84.09%	370	15.66%	6	0.25%	1,617	68.43%	2,363
Caroline County	1,104	80.76%	258	18.87%	5	0.37%	846	61.89%	1,367
Carroll County	2,122	39.53%	3,245	60.45%	1	0.02%	-1,123	-20.92%	5,368
Charles City County	233	74.68%	79	25.32%	0	0.00%	154	49.36%	312
Charlotte County	1,727	89.85%	190	9.89%	5	0.26%	1,537	79.97%	1,922
Chesterfield County	2,522	79.48%	621	19.57%	30	0.95%	1,901	59.91%	3,173
Clarke County	940	82.38%	198	17.35%	3	0.26%	742	65.03%	1,141
Craig County	653	62.25%	395	37.65%	1	0.10%	258	24.59%	1,049
Culpeper County	1,266	69.41%	551	30.21%	7	0.38%	715	39.20%	1,824
Cumberland County	476	77.27%	136	22.08%	4	0.65%	340	55.19%	616
Dickenson County	2,683	70.05%	1,146	29.92%	1	0.03%	1,537	40.13%	3,830
Dinwiddie County	1,343	91.05%	127	8.61%	5	0.34%	1,216	82.44%	1,475
Elizabeth City County	1,925	75.79%	597	23.50%	18	0.71%	1,328	52.28%	2,540
Essex County	527	81.71%	116	17.98%	2	0.31%	411	63.72%	645
Fairfax County	2,913	64.35%	1,584	34.99%	30	0.66%	1,329	29.36%	4,527
Fauquier County	2,037	76.24%	629	23.54%	6	0.22%	1,408	52.69%	2,672
Floyd County	699	30.75%	1,566	68.90%	8	0.35%	-867	-38.14%	2,273
Fluvanna County	586	72.52%	217	26.86%	5	0.62%	369	45.67%	808
Franklin County	2,285	69.83%	975	29.80%	12	0.37%	1,310	40.04%	3,272
Frederick County	1,386	67.35%	665	32.31%	7	0.34%	721	35.03%	2,058
Giles County	1,547	59.59%	1,047	40.33%	2	0.08%	500	19.26%	2,596
Gloucester County	1,012	78.03%	281	21.67%	4	0.31%	731	56.36%	1,297
Goochland County	638	73.33%	228	26.21%	4	0.46%	410	47.13%	870
Grayson County	3,005	47.31%	3,343	52.63%	4	0.06%	-338	-5.32%	6,352
Greene County	341	51.43%	321	48.42%	1	0.15%	20	3.02%	663
Greensville County	884	100.00%	0	0.00%	0	0.00%	884	100.00%	884
Halifax County	4,331	93.30%	302	6.51%	9	0.19%	4,029	86.79%	4,642
Hanover County	1,397	80.47%	327	18.84%	12	0.69%	1,070	61.64%	1,736
Henrico County	3,610	73.39%	1,285	26.12%	24	0.49%	2,325	47.27%	4,919
Henry County	1,790	79.48%	458	20.34%	4	0.18%	1,332	59.15%	2,252
Highland County	515	49.52%	522	50.19%	3	0.29%	-7	-0.67%	1,040
Isle of Wight County	1,025	83.00%	207	16.76%	3	0.24%	818	66.23%	1,235
James City County	302	81.18%	70	18.82%	0	0.00%	232	62.37%	372
King and Queen County	372	74.85%	124	24.95%	1	0.20%	248	49.90%	497
King George County	469	61.23%	295	38.51%	2	0.26%	174	22.72%	766
King William County	696	76.48%	211	23.19%	3	0.33%	485	53.30%	910
Lancaster County	689	67.95%	322	31.76%	3	0.30%	367	36.19%	1,014
Lee County	4,120	66.46%	2,066	33.33%	13	0.21%	2,054	33.13%	6,199
Loudoun County	2,287	72.33%	867	27.42%	8	0.25%	1,420	44.91%	3,162
Louisa County	1,100	68.84%	486	30.41%	12	0.75%	614	38.42%	1,598
Lunenburg County	1,291	94.23%	77	5.62%	2	0.15%	1,214	88.61%	1,370
Madison County	804	54.81%	662	45.13%	1	0.07%	142	9.68%	1,467
Mathews County	622	57.65%	452	41.89%	5	0.46%	170	15.76%	1,079
Mecklenburg County	2,730	93.05%	202	6.88%	2	0.07%	2,528	86.16%	2,934
Middlesex County	653	83.61%	123	15.75%	5	0.64%	530	67.86%	781
Montgomery County	1,832	49.34%	1,852	49.88%	29	0.78%	-20	-0.54%	3,713
Nansemond County	1,478	89.36%	175	10.58%	1	0.06%	1,303	78.78%	1,654
Nelson County	1,204	76.35%	370	23.46%	3	0.19%	834	52.89%	1,577
New Kent County	307	71.90%	120	28.10%	0	0.00%	187	43.79%	427
Norfolk County	3,734	84.75%	652	14.80%	20	0.45%	3,082	69.95%	4,406
Northampton County	975	77.69%	277	22.07%	3	0.24%	698	55.62%	1,255
Northumberland County	618	70.39%	260	29.61%	0	0.00%	358	40.77%	878
Nottoway County	1,297	82.72%	260	16.58%	11	0.70%	1,037	66.14%	1,568
Orange County	1,227	75.00%	402	24.57%	7	0.43%	825	50.43%	1,636
Page County	1,888	54.77%	1,551	45.00%	8	0.23%	337	9.78%	3,447
Patrick County	1,588	68.45%	726	31.29%	6	0.26%	862	37.16%	2,320
Pittsylvania County	3,694	86.82%	556	13.07%	5	0.12%	3,138	73.75%	4,255
Powhatan County	438	73.49%	158	26.51%	0	0.00%	280	46.98%	596
Prince Edward County	1,153	81.77%	253	17.94%	4	0.28%	900	63.83%	1,410
Prince George County	713	84.48%	128	15.17%	3	0.36%	585	69.31%	844
Prince William County	1,512	76.29%	457	23.06%	13	0.66%	1,055	53.23%	1,982
Princess Anne County	1,925	81.29%	436	18.41%	7	0.30%	1,489	62.88%	2,368
Pulaski County	2,337	66.37%	1,180	33.51%	4	0.11%	1,157	32.86%	3,521
Rappahannock County	686	73.92%	241	25.97%	1	0.11%	445	47.95%	928
Richmond County	451	67.51%	217	32.49%	0	0.00%	234	35.03%	668
Roanoke County	3,422	61.57%	2,105	37.87%	31	0.56%	1,317	23.70%	5,558
Rockbridge County	1,635	64.98%	868	34.50%	13	0.52%	767	30.48%	2,516
Rockingham County	2,916	50.33%	2,834	48.91%	44	0.76%	82	1.42%	5,794
Russell County	3,143	66.03%	1,599	33.59%	18	0.38%	1,544	32.44%	4,760
Scott County	2,122	50.91%	2,046	49.09%	0	0.00%	76	1.82%	4,168
Shenandoah County	2,861	47.46%	3,152	52.29%	15	0.25%	-291	-4.83%	6,028
Smyth County	2,337	52.86%	2,067	46.75%	17	0.38%	270	6.11%	4,421
Southampton County	1,673	91.62%	148	8.11%	5	0.27%	1,525	83.52%	1,826
Spotsylvania County	836	64.61%	453	35.01%	5	0.39%	383	29.60%	1,294
Stafford County	651	52.08%	596	47.68%	3	0.24%	55	4.40%	1,250
Surry County	715	88.93%	87	10.82%	2	0.25%	628	78.11%	804
Sussex County	880	87.48%	126	12.52%	0	0.00%	754	74.95%	1,006
Tazewell County	2,992	59.90%	1,981	39.66%	22	0.44%	1,011	20.24%	4,995
Warren County	1,174	73.19%	426	26.56%	4	0.25%	748	46.63%	1,604
Warwick County	870	80.93%	200	18.60%	5	0.47%	670	62.33%	1,075
Washington County	2,595	55.76%	2,047	43.98%	12	0.26%	548	11.77%	4,654
Westmoreland County	871	74.64%	296	25.36%	0	0.00%	575	49.27%	1,167
Wise County	5,399	72.28%	2,057	27.54%	14	0.19%	3,342	44.74%	7,470
Wythe County	2,089	42.82%	2,781	57.01%	8	0.16%	-692	-14.19%	4,878
York County	729	73.79%	228	23.08%	31	3.14%	501	50.71%	988
Alexandria City	3,381	72.71%	1,225	26.34%	44	0.95%	2,156	46.37%	4,650
Bristol City	1,364	81.09%	311	18.49%	7	0.42%	1,053	62.60%	1,682
Buena Vista City	363	67.22%	177	32.78%	0	0.00%	186	34.44%	540
Charlottesville City	1,393	79.97%	335	19.23%	14	0.80%	1,058	60.73%	1,742
Clifton Forge City	1,199	77.35%	343	22.13%	8	0.52%	856	55.23%	1,550
Danville City	3,266	84.94%	549	14.28%	30	0.78%	2,717	70.66%	3,845
Fredericksburg City	944	69.57%	411	30.29%	2	0.15%	533	39.28%	1,357
Hampton City	971	83.56%	190	16.35%	1	0.09%	781	67.21%	1,162
Harrisonburg City	1,390	60.51%	894	38.92%	13	0.57%	496	21.59%	2,297
Hopewell City	1,309	79.29%	332	20.11%	10	0.61%	977	59.18%	1,651
Lynchburg City	3,697	72.60%	1,373	26.96%	22	0.43%	2,324	45.64%	5,092
Martinsville City	949	78.56%	255	21.11%	4	0.33%	694	57.45%	1,208
Newport News City	4,021	81.04%	919	18.52%	22	0.44%	3,102	62.52%	4,962
Norfolk City	10,561	76.26%	3,229	23.32%	59	0.43%	7,332	52.94%	13,849
Petersburg City	2,192	82.69%	444	16.75%	15	0.57%	1,748	65.94%	2,651
Portsmouth City	5,617	86.30%	861	13.23%	31	0.48%	4,756	73.07%	6,509
Radford City	650	60.30%	421	39.05%	7	0.65%	229	21.24%	1,078
Richmond City	18,784	80.45%	4,478	19.18%	86	0.37%	14,306	61.27%	23,348
Roanoke City	7,087	67.47%	3,363	32.02%	54	0.51%	3,724	35.45%	10,504
South Norfolk City	823	82.14%	172	17.17%	7	0.70%	651	64.97%	1,002
Staunton City	1,091	65.41%	568	34.05%	9	0.54%	523	31.35%	1,668
Suffolk City	1,360	82.88%	281	17.12%	0	0.00%	1,079	65.75%	1,641
Williamsburg City	389	79.55%	96	19.63%	4	0.82%	293	59.92%	489
Winchester City	1,096	59.21%	743	40.14%	12	0.65%	353	19.07%	1,851
Totals	234,980	70.23%	98,336	29.39%	1,274	0.38%	136,644	40.84%	334,590

==== Counties and independent cities that flipped from Democratic to Republican ====
- Carroll
- Grayson
- Highland
- Montgomery
- Shenandoah
- Wythe
