= 1940 United States presidential election in Virginia =

- November 5, 1940

Nominee	Franklin D. Roosevelt	Wendell Willkie
Party	Democratic	Republican
Home state	New York	New York
Running mate	Henry A. Wallace	Charles L. McNary
Electoral vote	11	0
Popular vote	235,961	109,363
Percentage	68.08%	31.55%
County and independent city results
Roosevelt
50–60%
60–70%
70–80%
80–90%
90–100%
Willkie
50–60%
60–70%
President before election
Franklin D. Roosevelt
Democratic
Elected President
Franklin D. Roosevelt
Democratic

The 1940 United States presidential election in Virginia took place on November 5, 1940. Voters chose 11 representatives, or electors, to the Electoral College, who voted for president and vice president.

Virginia voted for the Democratic nominee, incumbent President Franklin D. Roosevelt, over the Republican nominee, businessman Wendell Willkie. Roosevelt ultimately won the national election with 54.74% of the vote. The election would be the last time Fairfax County, Virginia's most populous county would vote Democratic until 2004, apart from 1964. As of the 2024 presidential election, this is the last time the Democratic nominee won the counties of Greene, Madison and Wythe. It also proved the last time the Democrats would win Montgomery County until Bill Clinton did so in 1992.

== Results ==
1940 United States presidential election in Virginia
Party	Candidate	Votes	Percentage	Electoral votes
Democratic	Franklin D. Roosevelt (inc.)	235,961	68.08%	11
Republican	Wendell Willkie	109,363	31.55%	0
Prohibition	Roger Babson	882	0.25%	0
Socialist	Norman Thomas	282	0.08%	0
Communist	Earl Browder	71	0.02%	0
Socialist Labor	John W. Aiken	48	0.01%	0
Totals		346,607	100.00%	11
Voter turnout (voting age)				22.0%

=== Results by county ===
County or independent city	Franklin D. Roosevelt Democratic		Wendell Willkie Republican		Other candidates Various parties		Margin		Total votes cast
County or independent city	#	%	#	%	#	%	#	%	Total votes cast
Accomack County	1,476	62.38%	882	37.28%	8	0.34%	594	25.11%	2,366
Albemarle County	1,648	67.05%	804	32.71%	6	0.24%	844	34.34%	2,458
Alleghany County	2,153	64.67%	1,164	34.97%	12	0.36%	989	29.71%	3,329
Amelia County	562	67.63%	267	32.13%	2	0.24%	295	35.50%	831
Amherst County	2,048	87.26%	292	12.44%	7	0.30%	1,756	74.82%	2,347
Appomattox County	1,144	83.93%	215	15.77%	4	0.29%	929	68.16%	1,363
Arlington County	5,440	55.16%	4,365	44.26%	57	0.58%	1,075	10.90%	9,862
Augusta County	2,774	60.78%	1,768	38.74%	22	0.48%	1,006	22.04%	4,564
Bath County	630	54.17%	527	45.31%	6	0.52%	103	8.86%	1,163
Bedford County	2,535	75.90%	791	23.68%	14	0.42%	1,744	52.22%	3,340
Bland County	753	51.97%	693	47.83%	3	0.21%	60	4.14%	1,449
Botetourt County	1,329	54.87%	1,085	44.80%	8	0.33%	244	10.07%	2,422
Brunswick County	1,288	88.46%	164	11.26%	4	0.27%	1,124	77.20%	1,456
Buchanan County	2,554	66.37%	1,291	33.55%	3	0.08%	1,263	32.82%	3,848
Buckingham County	829	73.82%	289	25.73%	5	0.45%	540	48.09%	1,123
Campbell County	2,358	83.65%	456	16.18%	5	0.18%	1,902	67.47%	2,819
Caroline County	1,136	78.51%	305	21.08%	6	0.41%	831	57.43%	1,447
Carroll County	1,546	45.66%	1,835	54.19%	5	0.15%	-289	-8.54%	3,386
Charles City County	238	72.12%	92	27.88%	0	0.00%	146	44.24%	330
Charlotte County	1,467	85.24%	251	14.58%	3	0.17%	1,216	70.66%	1,721
Chesterfield County	3,354	78.71%	879	20.63%	28	0.66%	2,475	58.08%	4,261
Clarke County	1,043	75.58%	333	24.13%	4	0.29%	710	51.45%	1,380
Craig County	656	68.55%	299	31.24%	2	0.21%	357	37.30%	957
Culpeper County	1,208	67.34%	579	32.27%	7	0.39%	629	35.06%	1,794
Cumberland County	396	70.84%	157	28.09%	6	1.07%	239	42.75%	559
Dickenson County	2,551	58.74%	1,785	41.10%	7	0.16%	766	17.64%	4,343
Dinwiddie County	1,129	80.64%	264	18.86%	7	0.50%	865	61.79%	1,400
Elizabeth City County	2,337	77.90%	652	21.73%	11	0.37%	1,685	56.17%	3,000
Essex County	547	78.93%	145	20.92%	1	0.14%	402	58.01%	693
Fairfax County	3,263	57.65%	2,371	41.89%	26	0.46%	892	15.76%	5,660
Fauquier County	1,874	71.07%	756	28.67%	7	0.27%	1,118	42.40%	2,637
Floyd County	729	32.93%	1,482	66.94%	3	0.14%	-753	-34.01%	2,214
Fluvanna County	579	70.52%	241	29.35%	1	0.12%	338	41.17%	821
Franklin County	2,037	68.63%	925	31.17%	6	0.20%	1,112	37.47%	2,968
Frederick County	1,631	67.79%	773	32.13%	2	0.08%	858	35.66%	2,406
Giles County	1,716	62.54%	1,024	37.32%	4	0.15%	692	25.22%	2,744
Gloucester County	937	79.41%	241	20.42%	2	0.17%	696	58.98%	1,180
Goochland County	820	81.67%	180	17.93%	4	0.40%	640	63.75%	1,004
Grayson County	2,703	48.91%	2,806	50.78%	17	0.31%	-103	-1.86%	5,526
Greene County	363	56.28%	282	43.72%	0	0.00%	81	12.56%	645
Greensville County	843	84.38%	152	15.22%	4	0.40%	691	69.17%	999
Halifax County	3,441	89.94%	373	9.75%	12	0.31%	3,068	80.19%	3,826
Hanover County	1,347	78.36%	364	21.18%	8	0.47%	983	57.18%	1,719
Henrico County	3,993	66.25%	2,005	33.27%	29	0.48%	1,988	32.98%	6,027
Henry County	1,795	78.73%	474	20.79%	11	0.48%	1,321	57.94%	2,280
Highland County	549	46.45%	628	53.13%	5	0.42%	-79	-6.68%	1,182
Isle of Wight County	1,138	84.55%	208	15.45%	0	0.00%	930	69.09%	1,346
James City County	306	67.40%	146	32.16%	2	0.44%	160	35.24%	454
King and Queen County	365	74.49%	124	25.31%	1	0.20%	241	49.18%	490
King George County	515	75.40%	167	24.45%	1	0.15%	348	50.95%	683
King William County	697	74.79%	235	25.21%	0	0.00%	462	49.57%	932
Lancaster County	711	68.63%	317	30.60%	8	0.77%	394	38.03%	1,036
Lee County	4,180	61.39%	2,623	38.52%	6	0.09%	1,557	22.87%	6,809
Loudoun County	2,156	66.73%	1,061	32.84%	14	0.43%	1,095	33.89%	3,231
Louisa County	896	60.46%	573	38.66%	13	0.88%	323	21.79%	1,482
Lunenburg County	1,213	89.26%	144	10.60%	2	0.15%	1,069	78.66%	1,359
Madison County	692	51.56%	646	48.14%	4	0.30%	46	3.43%	1,342
Mathews County	592	62.51%	349	36.85%	6	0.63%	243	25.66%	947
Mecklenburg County	2,402	88.54%	308	11.35%	3	0.11%	2,094	77.18%	2,713
Middlesex County	586	82.19%	125	17.53%	2	0.28%	461	64.66%	713
Montgomery County	2,168	53.20%	1,890	46.38%	17	0.42%	278	6.82%	4,075
Nansemond County	1,408	91.55%	129	8.39%	1	0.07%	1,279	83.16%	1,538
Nelson County	1,291	79.40%	330	20.30%	5	0.31%	961	59.10%	1,626
New Kent County	286	68.26%	133	31.74%	0	0.00%	153	36.52%	419
Norfolk County	3,821	85.39%	639	14.28%	15	0.34%	3,182	71.11%	4,475
Northampton County	866	70.52%	359	29.23%	3	0.24%	507	41.29%	1,228
Northumberland County	712	64.61%	386	35.03%	4	0.36%	326	29.58%	1,102
Nottoway County	1,290	77.06%	373	22.28%	11	0.66%	917	54.78%	1,674
Orange County	1,283	72.94%	464	26.38%	12	0.68%	819	46.56%	1,759
Page County	1,596	49.30%	1,630	50.36%	11	0.34%	-34	-1.05%	3,237
Patrick County	1,479	73.99%	514	25.71%	6	0.30%	965	48.27%	1,999
Pittsylvania County	3,710	83.28%	728	16.34%	17	0.38%	2,982	66.94%	4,455
Powhatan County	510	76.23%	157	23.47%	2	0.30%	353	52.77%	669
Prince Edward County	1,110	77.35%	313	21.81%	12	0.84%	797	55.54%	1,435
Prince George County	766	82.81%	156	16.86%	3	0.32%	610	65.95%	925
Prince William County	1,435	73.97%	500	25.77%	5	0.26%	935	48.20%	1,940
Princess Anne County	1,689	79.04%	445	20.82%	3	0.14%	1,244	58.21%	2,137
Pulaski County	2,226	68.39%	1,023	31.43%	6	0.18%	1,203	36.96%	3,255
Rappahannock County	588	72.06%	225	27.57%	3	0.37%	363	44.49%	816
Richmond County	475	64.10%	257	34.68%	9	1.21%	218	29.42%	741
Roanoke County	3,539	60.11%	2,302	39.10%	47	0.80%	1,237	21.01%	5,888
Rockbridge County	1,618	63.83%	902	35.58%	15	0.59%	716	28.24%	2,535
Rockingham County	2,569	46.34%	2,922	52.71%	53	0.96%	-353	-6.37%	5,544
Russell County	3,109	59.79%	2,080	40.00%	11	0.21%	1,029	19.79%	5,200
Scott County	2,474	45.28%	2,982	54.58%	8	0.15%	-508	-9.30%	5,464
Shenandoah County	2,450	40.89%	3,527	58.87%	14	0.23%	-1,077	-17.98%	5,991
Smyth County	2,420	52.95%	2,134	46.70%	16	0.35%	286	6.26%	4,570
Southampton County	1,508	87.02%	213	12.29%	12	0.69%	1,295	74.73%	1,733
Spotsylvania County	785	68.02%	365	31.63%	4	0.35%	420	36.40%	1,154
Stafford County	803	63.28%	463	36.49%	3	0.24%	340	26.79%	1,269
Surry County	658	84.58%	120	15.42%	0	0.00%	538	69.15%	778
Sussex County	737	81.62%	164	18.16%	2	0.22%	573	63.46%	903
Tazewell County	3,108	56.80%	2,356	43.06%	8	0.15%	752	13.74%	5,472
Warren County	1,338	73.00%	491	26.79%	4	0.22%	847	46.21%	1,833
Warwick County	1,065	77.57%	305	22.21%	3	0.22%	760	55.35%	1,373
Washington County	3,245	54.30%	2,697	45.13%	34	0.57%	548	9.17%	5,976
Westmoreland County	845	70.24%	357	29.68%	1	0.08%	488	40.57%	1,203
Wise County	4,538	75.66%	1,448	24.14%	12	0.20%	3,090	51.52%	5,998
Wythe County	1,695	52.72%	1,507	46.87%	13	0.40%	188	5.85%	3,215
York County	787	80.31%	177	18.06%	16	1.63%	610	62.24%	980
Alexandria City	4,004	68.67%	1,802	30.90%	25	0.43%	2,202	37.76%	5,831
Bristol City	1,465	76.94%	423	22.22%	16	0.84%	1,042	54.73%	1,904
Buena Vista City	280	70.89%	113	28.61%	2	0.51%	167	42.28%	395
Charlottesville City	1,759	69.94%	743	29.54%	13	0.52%	1,016	40.40%	2,515
Clifton Forge City	1,179	76.41%	353	22.88%	11	0.71%	826	53.53%	1,543
Danville City	3,324	80.27%	787	19.01%	30	0.72%	2,537	61.27%	4,141
Fredericksburg City	1,037	66.26%	522	33.35%	6	0.38%	515	32.91%	1,565
Hampton City	975	81.66%	215	18.01%	4	0.34%	760	63.65%	1,194
Harrisonburg City	1,462	58.93%	1,000	40.31%	19	0.77%	462	18.62%	2,481
Hopewell City	981	76.05%	308	23.88%	1	0.08%	673	52.17%	1,290
Lynchburg City	4,656	70.22%	1,966	29.65%	9	0.14%	2,690	40.57%	6,631
Martinsville City	980	78.15%	269	21.45%	5	0.40%	711	56.70%	1,254
Newport News City	3,907	81.41%	863	17.98%	29	0.60%	3,044	63.43%	4,799
Norfolk City	10,783	75.38%	3,485	24.36%	36	0.25%	7,298	51.02%	14,304
Petersburg City	2,193	77.90%	604	21.46%	18	0.64%	1,589	56.45%	2,815
Portsmouth City	5,053	87.83%	675	11.73%	25	0.43%	4,378	76.10%	5,753
Radford City	793	65.21%	417	34.29%	6	0.49%	376	30.92%	1,216
Richmond City	19,332	75.99%	6,031	23.71%	76	0.30%	13,301	52.29%	25,439
Roanoke City	6,942	65.85%	3,553	33.70%	47	0.45%	3,389	32.15%	10,542
South Norfolk City	920	85.50%	156	14.50%	0	0.00%	764	71.00%	1,076
Staunton City	1,042	59.75%	687	39.39%	15	0.86%	355	20.36%	1,744
Suffolk City	1,215	76.03%	383	23.97%	0	0.00%	832	52.07%	1,598
Williamsburg City	367	67.84%	168	31.05%	6	1.11%	199	36.78%	541
Winchester City	1,114	53.89%	945	45.72%	8	0.39%	169	8.18%	2,067
Totals	235,961	68.08%	109,363	31.55%	1,284	0.37%	126,598	36.52%	346,608

==== Counties and independent cities that flipped from Democratic to Republican ====
- Rockingham
- Page

==== Counties and independent cities that flipped from Republican to Democratic ====
- Montgomery
- Wythe
