= Jordan Bridge =

South Norfolk Jordan Bridge
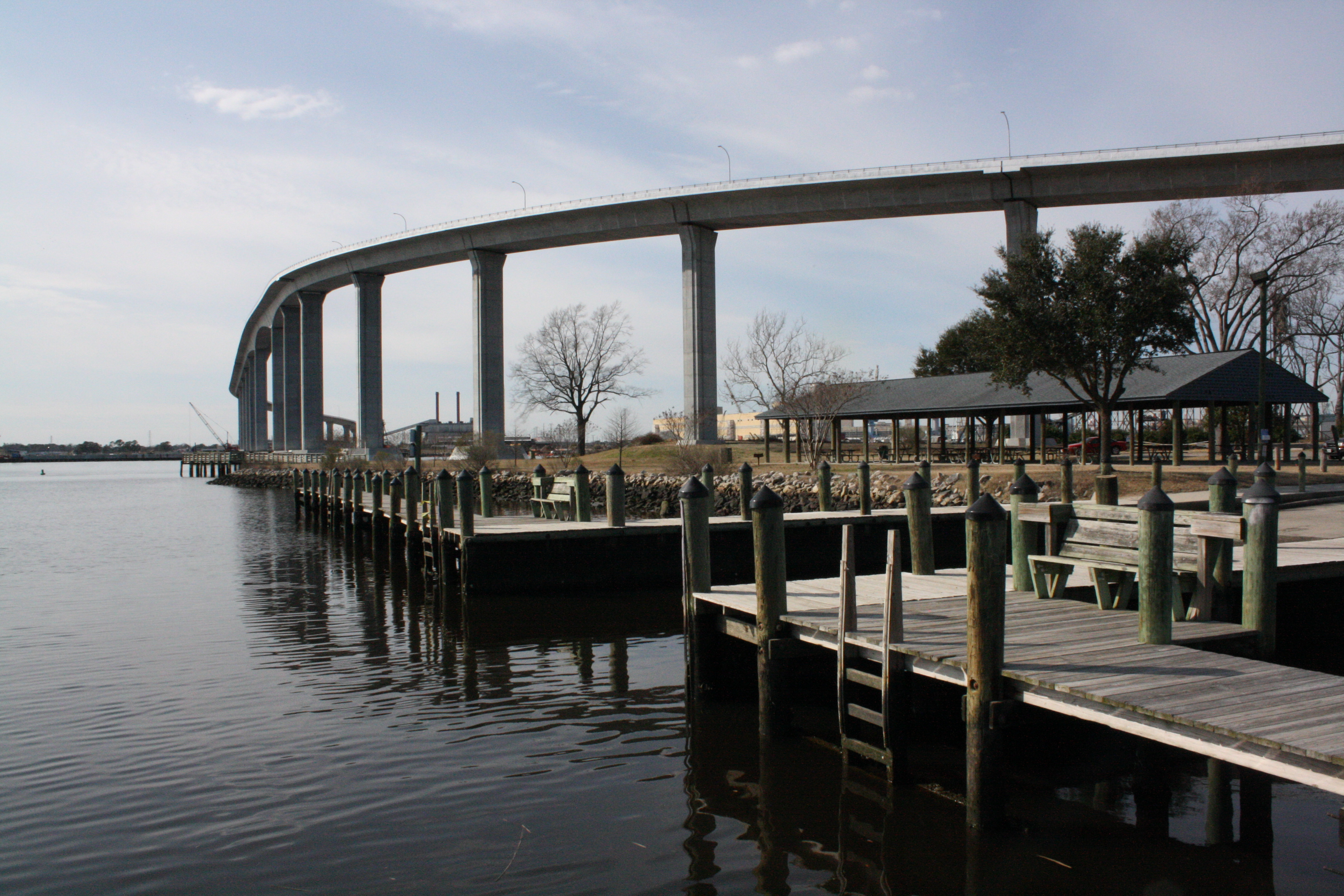
- The new South Norfolk Jordan Bridge
- Coordinates: 36°48′30″N 76°17′24″W
- Carries: Vehicles, pedestrians
- Crosses: Southern Branch Elizabeth River
- Locale: Chesapeake, Portsmouth
- Official name: South Norfolk Jordan Bridge
- Other name: Jordan Bridge
- Owner: United Bridge Partners

Characteristics
- Total length: about 5,000 ft (1,500 m)
- Height: 145 ft (44 m)

Location
- Interactive map of South Norfolk Jordan Bridge

The Jordan Bridge, officially named the South Norfolk Jordan Bridge, is a tolled highway fixed bridge which carries State Route 337 over the Southern Branch Elizabeth River between the City of Portsmouth into the City of Chesapeake in South Hampton Roads, Virginia. The new crossing is an all-electronic toll facility that eliminated bridge lifts and height and weight restrictions and restored a vital river crossing for the Hampton Roads region.

Originally opened in 1928, it was privately built by an organization led by South Norfolk businessmen Wallace and Carl Jordan. It was later renamed the Jordan Bridge, principally to honor long-standing manager Carl M. Jordan. The oldest drawbridge in Virginia, the 80-year-old bridge had reached the end of its useful life by 2008. Faced with diminishing returns on millions of dollars in needed maintenance and unknown reliability, it was permanently closed on November 8, 2008.

A replacement bridge, built with 100% private funds, and paid for by tolls, was approved by Chesapeake City Council on January 27, 2009. The new South Norfolk Jordan Bridge was originally scheduled to be completed by July 2010, but was finally completed and opened for use on October 27, 2012. It is owned and operated by United Bridge Partners, a business consortium consisting of Figg Bridge Builders and a private infrastructure investment firm.

== Early history ==
Originally known as the Norfolk-Portsmouth Bridge, the bridge was planned and financing organized by South Norfolk businessman Carl M. Jordan, who operated Jordan Brothers Lumber Co. with his brother Wallace. The Jordan brothers brought lumber from the Great Dismal Swamp to their lumber mill in South Norfolk, and had come to believe that the existing Norfolk County Ferry Service was not dependable enough for the needs of their business, or others in the community.

It was a Waddell & Harrington-type vertical-lift drawbridge and was designed by Harrington, Howard, & Ash (engineers) of Kansas City, Missouri. It was completed at a cost of $1.25 million, and opened on August 24, 1928, as a toll bridge with a ceremony attended by Virginia's Governor Harry F. Byrd.

Many years later, the bridge was renamed for Carl Jordan, who also had served as general manager and executive vice president of the South Norfolk Bridge Commission, Inc., a non-profit corporation organized in 1944 to manage the bridge. Ownership of the bridge was transferred to the City of Chesapeake after the Bridge Commission's indebtedness was finally satisfied in 1977.

== Incidents: collisions with ships, mechanical failure ==
The Southern Branch Elizabeth River is heavily used by ocean-going vessels to reach industrial facilities and a shipyard upstream from the Jordan Bridge. Traffic bound for the Atlantic Intracoastal Waterway also passes through this point.

The Jordan Bridge was struck by ships several times. On June 2, 1939, an oil tanker struck it, and the east tower and lift span collapsed into the river, injuring two bridge employees, and closing it for more than 6 months. Another major collision of a ship occurred on June 13, 1943. The most recent collision with a ship was in January, 2004.

In more recent years, there were periodic problems with the lift mechanism in addition to occasional collisions. When stuck in the "down" position, navigation for ocean-going vessels was severely inhibited, leading to concerns by shipping companies, ship operators and the U.S. Navy, whose shipyard is just downstream from the span. The equipment was mechanically obsolete, and repair parts were often unavailable.

== Modern use ==
In recent years, the bridge was heavily traveled during morning and afternoon rush hours by motor vehicle traffic. A substantial portion of those were shipyard workers from the Norfolk Naval Shipyard. Navy personnel assigned to the ships docked there also commute from homes in the eastern portion of South Hampton Roads, which includes the cities of Norfolk and Virginia Beach and a large portion of the City of Chesapeake.

The Jordan Bridge also had served effectively as an alternate route when other key river crossings in the area were congested or closed, most notably after Hurricane Isabel in October 2003 when the Midtown Tunnel connecting Portsmouth and Norfolk was flooded. Tolls on the Jordan Bridge were temporarily suspended, and daily traffic increased by 20,000 vehicles.

As the bridge and its approaches have only one lane in each direction, traffic backups and delays often occurred in more recent years. The Jordan Bridge was the oldest drawbridge in Virginia. Formerly operated by the City of Chesapeake's Department of Public Works, it had a restricted weight limit of 3 tons. Daily toll revenue was approximately $5,000. The toll (collected on the Chesapeake side) for both direction was 50 cents for motorcycles, 75 cents for two axle vehicles, $1.00 for three axles and $1.25 for four axles. There were no facilities for electronic toll collection.

== Replacement ==
Necessary repairs requiring too much expenditure, caused the city council to vote to shut down the bridge in October 2008.

The new bridge has a bi-directional, tiered toll structure based on vehicle class, peak/off peak period, and E-ZPass/Pay-by-Plate payment option, with a free pedestrian walkway/jogging path. The new South Norfolk Jordan Bridge opened on October 26, 2012, at a reported construction cost of $142 million.

On December 16, 2022, a fire occurred at a trash plant near the Jordan Bridge, causing it to partially close. The bridge was re-opened January 7, 2023.
