= 1932 United States presidential election in Virginia =

- November 8, 1932

Nominee	Franklin D. Roosevelt	Herbert Hoover
Party	Democratic	Republican
Home state	New York	California
Running mate	John N. Garner	Charles Curtis
Electoral vote	11	0
Popular vote	203,979	89,637
Percentage	68.46%	30.09%
County and independent city results
Roosevelt
50–60%
60–70%
70–80%
80–90%
90–100%
Hoover
50–60%
President before election
Herbert Hoover
Republican
Elected President
Franklin D. Roosevelt
Democratic

The 1932 United States presidential election in Virginia took place on November 8, 1932. Voters chose eleven representatives, or electors to the Electoral College, who voted for president and vice president.

Like all former Confederate States, early twentieth-century Virginia almost completely disenfranchised its black and poor white populations through the use of a cumulative poll tax and literacy tests. So severe was the disenfranchising effect of the new 1902 Constitution that it has been calculated that a third of the electorate during the first half of the twentieth century comprised state employees and officeholders.

This limited electorate meant Virginian politics was controlled by political machines based in Southside Virginia—the 1920s would see the building of the Byrd Organization which would control the state's politics until the Voting Rights Act. Progressive “antiorganization” factions were rendered impotent by the inability of almost all their potential electorate to vote. Unlike the Deep South, historical fusion with the “Readjuster” Democrats, defection over free silver of substantial proportions of the Northeast-aligned white electorate of the Shenandoah Valley and Southwest Virginia, and an early move towards a “lily white” Jim Crow party meant that in general elections the Republicans retained around one-third of the small statewide electorate, with the majority of GOP support located in the western part of the state. However—like in Tennessee during the same era—the parties avoided competition in many areas by an agreed division over local offices.

1928 saw a substantial change, whereby a combination of anti-Catholicism in the Tidewater region and growing middle-class Republicanism in the cities saw Republican Herbert Hoover carry Virginia's electoral votes and elect three Congressmen, including the local district of emerging machine leader Byrd. However, a combination of record drought and the economic catastrophe of the Great Depression meant that the trend towards the GOP would be short-lived. The Depression had extremely severe effects in the South, which had the highest unemployment rate in the nation, and many Southerners blamed this on the North and on Wall Street, rejecting Hoover's claim that the Depression's causes were exogenous.

For some time in 1932, Byrd was seen as a possible compromise candidate between Roosevelt and Al Smith for the Democratic presidential nomination; however, Southern opposition to Smith meant that Byrd ultimately wavered on seeking the nomination and accepted Roosevelt, as even delegates from such states as North Carolina rejected him for FDR.

Neither major party candidate campaigned in the state, and no polls were taken early in the campaign. when the state was finally polled in the middle of October, Roosevelt was clearly leading over Hoover by around five-to-two. A later poll had Roosevelt winning by seventy thousand votes, despite overall being much more favourable to the incumbent president than most other polls. As it turned out, the earlier poll was more accurate, with Roosevelt winning by over one hundred and fourteen thousand votes. Roosevelt ultimately won the national election with 57.41 percent of the vote, and is to date the last Democrat to carry Carroll, Highland, and Shenandoah counties.

== Results ==
1932 United States presidential election in Virginia
Party	Candidate	Votes	Percentage	Electoral votes
Democratic	Franklin D. Roosevelt	203,979	68.46%	11
Republican	Herbert Hoover (inc.)	89,637	30.09%	0
Socialist	Norman Thomas	2,382	0.80%	0
Prohibition	William D. Upshaw	1,843	0.62%	0
Communist	William Z. Foster	86	0.03%	0
Farmer–Labor	Jacob S. Coxey Sr.	15	0.01%	0
Totals		297,942	100.00%	11

=== Results by county or independent city ===
1932 United States presidential election in Virginia by counties and independent cities
County or city	Franklin D. Roosevelt Democratic		Herbert Hoover Republican		Other candidates Various parties		Margin		Total votes cast
County or city	#	%	#	%	#	%	#	%	Total votes cast
Accomack County	2,458	81.74%	527	17.53%	22	0.73%	1,931	64.22%	3,007
Albemarle County	1,949	78.24%	508	20.39%	34	1.36%	1,441	57.85%	2,491
Alleghany County	1,293	53.50%	1,095	45.30%	29	1.20%	198	8.19%	2,417
Amelia County	701	82.08%	142	16.63%	11	1.29%	559	65.46%	854
Amherst County	1,764	89.09%	195	9.85%	21	1.06%	1,569	79.24%	1,980
Appomattox County	1,123	83.99%	204	15.26%	10	0.75%	919	68.74%	1,337
Arlington County	3,285	52.69%	2,806	45.01%	143	2.29%	479	7.68%	6,234
Augusta County	2,606	61.51%	1,541	36.37%	90	2.12%	1,065	25.14%	4,237
Bath County	594	59.88%	384	38.71%	14	1.41%	210	21.17%	992
Bedford County	2,321	81.99%	469	16.57%	41	1.45%	1,852	65.42%	2,831
Bland County	783	57.74%	556	41.00%	17	1.25%	227	16.74%	1,356
Botetourt County	1,808	59.12%	1,209	39.54%	41	1.34%	599	19.59%	3,058
Brunswick County	1,361	95.58%	52	3.65%	11	0.77%	1,309	91.92%	1,424
Buchanan County	1,372	65.24%	727	34.57%	4	0.19%	645	30.67%	2,103
Buckingham County	870	79.82%	204	18.72%	16	1.47%	666	61.10%	1,090
Campbell County	1,692	83.72%	301	14.89%	28	1.39%	1,391	68.83%	2,021
Caroline County	1,076	78.89%	270	19.79%	18	1.32%	806	59.09%	1,364
Carroll County	1,537	50.79%	1,461	48.28%	28	0.93%	76	2.51%	3,026
Charles City County	245	73.13%	85	25.37%	5	1.49%	160	47.76%	335
Charlotte County	1,300	88.02%	169	11.44%	8	0.54%	1,131	76.57%	1,477
Chesterfield County	1,886	69.90%	726	26.91%	86	3.19%	1,160	42.99%	2,698
Clarke County	841	86.43%	124	12.74%	8	0.82%	717	73.69%	973
Craig County	649	67.18%	302	31.26%	15	1.55%	347	35.92%	966
Culpeper County	1,349	75.70%	417	23.40%	16	0.90%	932	52.30%	1,782
Cumberland County	511	84.05%	84	13.82%	13	2.14%	427	70.23%	608
Dickenson County	2,635	67.95%	1,228	31.67%	15	0.39%	1,407	36.28%	3,878
Dinwiddie County	1,028	90.18%	104	9.12%	8	0.70%	924	81.05%	1,140
Elizabeth City County	1,226	62.58%	700	35.73%	33	1.68%	526	26.85%	1,959
Essex County	420	80.15%	101	19.27%	3	0.57%	319	60.88%	524
Fairfax County	2,714	65.33%	1,368	32.93%	72	1.73%	1,346	32.40%	4,154
Fauquier County	1,999	83.43%	379	15.82%	18	0.75%	1,620	67.61%	2,396
Floyd County	699	39.90%	1,051	59.99%	2	0.11%	-352	-20.09%	1,752
Fluvanna County	579	75.39%	176	22.92%	13	1.69%	403	52.47%	768
Franklin County	2,245	72.96%	812	26.39%	20	0.65%	1,433	46.57%	3,077
Frederick County	1,536	76.19%	456	22.62%	24	1.19%	1,080	53.57%	2,016
Giles County	1,754	62.60%	1,016	36.26%	32	1.14%	738	26.34%	2,802
Gloucester County	916	75.64%	280	23.12%	15	1.24%	636	52.52%	1,211
Goochland County	629	77.65%	166	20.49%	15	1.85%	463	57.16%	810
Grayson County	2,306	58.26%	1,624	41.03%	28	0.71%	682	17.23%	3,958
Greene County	394	60.43%	258	39.57%	0	0.00%	136	20.86%	652
Greensville County	692	85.33%	112	13.81%	7	0.86%	580	71.52%	811
Halifax County	3,583	91.85%	275	7.05%	43	1.10%	3,308	84.80%	3,901
Hanover County	1,073	80.56%	238	17.87%	21	1.58%	835	62.69%	1,332
Henrico County	2,458	63.43%	1,291	33.32%	126	3.25%	1,167	30.12%	3,875
Henry County	1,146	76.25%	342	22.75%	15	1.00%	804	53.49%	1,503
Highland County	464	55.37%	355	42.36%	19	2.27%	109	13.01%	838
Isle of Wight County	982	77.02%	284	22.27%	9	0.71%	698	54.75%	1,275
James City County	302	71.06%	116	27.29%	7	1.65%	186	43.76%	425
King and Queen County	368	68.79%	154	28.79%	13	2.43%	214	40.00%	535
King George County	475	69.65%	203	29.77%	4	0.59%	272	39.88%	682
King William County	612	76.12%	177	22.01%	15	1.87%	435	54.10%	804
Lancaster County	639	68.93%	272	29.34%	16	1.73%	367	39.59%	927
Lee County	2,892	58.84%	1,985	40.39%	38	0.77%	907	18.45%	4,915
Loudoun County	2,440	79.45%	600	19.54%	31	1.01%	1,840	59.92%	3,071
Louisa County	879	68.62%	366	28.57%	36	2.81%	513	40.05%	1,281
Lunenburg County	1,141	91.50%	92	7.38%	14	1.12%	1,049	84.12%	1,247
Madison County	849	61.52%	522	37.83%	9	0.65%	327	23.70%	1,380
Mathews County	652	56.50%	488	42.29%	14	1.21%	164	14.21%	1,154
Mecklenburg County	2,188	88.30%	275	11.10%	15	0.61%	1,913	77.20%	2,478
Middlesex County	595	80.19%	127	17.12%	20	2.70%	468	63.07%	742
Montgomery County	1,805	53.01%	1,522	44.70%	78	2.29%	283	8.31%	3,405
Nansemond County	1,264	86.22%	196	13.37%	6	0.41%	1,068	72.85%	1,466
Nelson County	1,457	85.61%	238	13.98%	7	0.41%	1,219	71.62%	1,702
New Kent County	286	70.44%	115	28.33%	5	1.23%	171	42.12%	406
Norfolk County	2,926	72.09%	1,072	26.41%	61	1.50%	1,854	45.68%	4,059
Northampton County	1,264	80.15%	298	18.90%	15	0.95%	966	61.26%	1,577
Northumberland County	630	71.27%	245	27.71%	9	1.02%	385	43.55%	884
Nottoway County	1,348	80.67%	277	16.58%	46	2.75%	1,071	64.09%	1,671
Orange County	1,253	79.96%	309	19.72%	5	0.32%	944	60.24%	1,567
Page County	1,851	58.61%	1,261	39.93%	46	1.46%	590	18.68%	3,158
Patrick County	1,342	72.42%	486	26.23%	25	1.35%	856	46.20%	1,853
Pittsylvania County	3,124	81.35%	656	17.08%	60	1.56%	2,468	64.27%	3,840
Powhatan County	433	78.02%	108	19.46%	14	2.52%	325	58.56%	555
Prince Edward County	970	81.04%	196	16.37%	31	2.59%	774	64.66%	1,197
Prince George County	597	83.03%	115	15.99%	7	0.97%	482	67.04%	719
Prince William County	1,499	78.61%	386	20.24%	22	1.15%	1,113	58.36%	1,907
Princess Anne County	1,451	76.29%	432	22.71%	19	1.00%	1,019	53.58%	1,902
Pulaski County	2,314	66.99%	1,109	32.11%	31	0.90%	1,205	34.89%	3,454
Rappahannock County	590	81.94%	124	17.22%	6	0.83%	466	64.72%	720
Richmond County	461	69.95%	192	29.14%	6	0.91%	269	40.82%	659
Roanoke County	2,509	58.79%	1,704	39.93%	55	1.29%	805	18.86%	4,268
Rockbridge County	1,764	67.35%	811	30.97%	44	1.68%	953	36.39%	2,619
Rockingham County	2,750	53.85%	2,194	42.96%	163	3.19%	556	10.89%	5,107
Russell County	3,274	70.09%	1,386	29.67%	11	0.24%	1,888	40.42%	4,671
Scott County	2,137	55.64%	1,673	43.56%	31	0.81%	464	12.08%	3,841
Shenandoah County	2,635	50.51%	2,514	48.19%	68	1.30%	121	2.32%	5,217
Smyth County	2,287	54.50%	1,843	43.92%	66	1.57%	444	10.58%	4,196
Southampton County	1,357	87.15%	182	11.69%	18	1.16%	1,175	75.47%	1,557
Spotsylvania County	784	68.35%	346	30.17%	17	1.48%	438	38.19%	1,147
Stafford County	731	61.38%	454	38.12%	6	0.50%	277	23.26%	1,191
Surry County	653	88.72%	73	9.92%	10	1.36%	580	78.80%	736
Sussex County	688	83.39%	122	14.79%	15	1.82%	566	68.61%	825
Tazewell County	2,713	56.97%	2,005	42.10%	44	0.92%	708	14.87%	4,762
Warren County	1,096	74.46%	367	24.93%	9	0.61%	729	49.52%	1,472
Warwick County	645	71.67%	242	26.89%	13	1.44%	403	44.78%	900
Washington County	2,784	60.17%	1,774	38.34%	69	1.49%	1,010	21.83%	4,627
Westmoreland County	641	74.80%	212	24.74%	4	0.47%	429	50.06%	857
Wise County	5,276	68.13%	2,405	31.06%	63	0.81%	2,871	37.07%	7,744
Wythe County	1,866	53.56%	1,589	45.61%	29	0.83%	277	7.95%	3,484
York County	457	56.84%	309	38.43%	38	4.73%	148	18.41%	804
Alexandria City	2,941	70.29%	1,199	28.66%	44	1.05%	1,742	41.63%	4,184
Bristol City	1,252	79.09%	307	19.39%	24	1.52%	945	59.70%	1,583
Buena Vista City	258	58.90%	154	35.16%	26	5.94%	104	23.74%	438
Charlottesville City	1,287	75.53%	409	24.00%	8	0.47%	878	51.53%	1,704
Clifton Forge City	917	72.15%	328	25.81%	26	2.05%	589	46.34%	1,271
Danville City	2,264	73.41%	740	23.99%	80	2.59%	1,524	49.42%	3,084
Fredericksburg City	812	68.18%	366	30.73%	13	1.09%	446	37.45%	1,191
Hampton City	772	71.22%	294	27.12%	18	1.66%	478	44.10%	1,084
Harrisonburg City	995	58.81%	665	39.30%	32	1.89%	330	19.50%	1,692
Hopewell City	957	72.50%	342	25.91%	21	1.59%	615	46.59%	1,320
Lynchburg City	3,656	74.07%	1,200	24.31%	80	1.62%	2,456	49.76%	4,936
Martinsville City	739	77.14%	212	22.13%	7	0.73%	527	55.01%	958
Newport News City	2,703	62.80%	1,515	35.20%	86	2.00%	1,188	27.60%	4,304
Norfolk City	8,814	65.45%	4,403	32.69%	250	1.86%	4,411	32.75%	13,467
Petersburg City	1,920	78.69%	490	20.08%	30	1.23%	1,430	58.61%	2,440
Portsmouth City	3,344	63.17%	1,840	34.76%	110	2.08%	1,504	28.41%	5,294
Radford City	542	59.63%	341	37.51%	26	2.86%	201	22.11%	909
Richmond City	14,631	70.75%	5,602	27.09%	448	2.17%	9,029	43.66%	20,681
Roanoke City	6,215	65.15%	3,195	33.49%	130	1.36%	3,020	31.66%	9,540
South Norfolk City	597	63.17%	329	34.81%	19	2.01%	268	28.36%	945
Staunton City	988	63.54%	551	35.43%	16	1.03%	437	28.10%	1,555
Suffolk City	1,013	78.71%	265	20.59%	9	0.70%	748	58.12%	1,287
Williamsburg City	387	76.63%	99	19.60%	19	3.76%	288	57.03%	505
Winchester City	1,179	61.73%	698	36.54%	33	1.73%	481	25.18%	1,910
Totals	203,979	68.46%	89,637	30.09%	4,326	1.45%	114,342	38.38%	297,942

==== Counties and independent cities that flipped from Republican to Democratic ====
- Arlington
- Alleghany
- Augusta
- Bath
- Bland
- Botetourt
- Carroll
- Charles City
- Chesterfield
- Elizabeth City
- Fairfax
- Giles
- Gloucester
- Greene
- Grayson
- Henrico
- Highland
- Isle of Wight
- James City
- King and Queen
- King George
- Lancaster
- Lee
- Louisa
- Madison
- Mathews
- Montgomery
- New Kent
- Norfolk
- Northumberland
- Patrick
- Pittsylvania
- Page
- Princess Anne
- Pulaski
- Richmond
- Roanoke
- Rockingham
- Scott
- Smyth
- Shenandoah
- Spotsylvania
- Stafford
- Tazewell
- Westmoreland
- Warick
- Washington
- Wythe
- York
- Alexandria
- Buena Vista
- Clifton Forge
- Danville
- Fredericksburg
- Harrisonburg
- Hopewell
- Lynchburg
- Norfolk
- Portsmouth
- Newport News
- Radford
- Richmond
- Roanoke
- South Norfolk
- Staunton
- Winchester

== Analysis ==
Although Roosevelt won Virginia by a margin that exceeded Woodrow Wilson’s two victories in the state and was the best Democratic performance since Andrew Jackson exactly a century previously, Hoover—despite losing every county except Floyd—was still able to maintain a small portion of the urban and Tidewater gains made by the Republicans during the 1920s. In some counties of the Virginia Peninsula and Middle Peninsula, the incumbent president bettered Calvin Coolidge’s 1924 performance even in a depression year.

As of the 2024 presidential election, this is the last election in which Carroll County, Highland County, and Shenandoah County voted for a Democratic presidential candidate. This is the closest anyone has come to sweeping every Virginia county since 1820.
