= 1924 United States presidential election in Virginia =

- November 4, 1924

Nominee	John W. Davis	Calvin Coolidge
Party	Democratic	Republican
Home state	West Virginia	Massachusetts
Running mate	Charles W. Bryan	Charles G. Dawes
Electoral vote	12	0
Popular vote	139,797	73,359
Percentage	62.49%	32.79%
County and independent city results
Davis
40–50%
50–60%
60–70%
70–80%
80–90%
90–100%
Coolidge
40–50%
50–60%
60–70%
President before election
Calvin Coolidge
Republican
Elected President
Calvin Coolidge
Republican

The 1924 United States presidential election in Virginia took place on November 4, 1924. Voters chose 12 representatives, or electors to the Electoral College, who voted for president and vice president.

The 1900s had seen Virginia, like all former Confederate States, almost completely disenfranchise its black and poor white populations through the use of a cumulative poll tax and literacy tests. So severe was the disenfranchising effect of the new 1902 Constitution that the electorate for the 1904 presidential election was halved compared to that of previous elections, and it has been calculated that a third of those who voted were state employees and officeholders.

This limited electorate meant Virginian politics was controlled by political machines based in Southside Virginia — firstly one led by Thomas Staples Martin and after he died the Byrd Organization. Progressive “antiorganization” factions were rendered impotent by the inability of almost all their potential electorate to vote. Unlike the Deep South, historical fusion with the “Readjuster” Democrats, defection of substantial proportions of the Northeast-aligned white electorate of the Shenandoah Valley and Southwest Virginia over free silver, and an early move towards a “lily white” Jim Crow party meant that in general elections the Republicans retained around one-third of the small statewide electorate, with the majority of GOP support located in the western part of the state. However, in many areas — like in Tennessee during the same era — the parties avoided competition by an agreed division over local offices.

Virginia was less affected than Oklahoma, Tennessee or North Carolina by the upheavals of World War I and the Nineteenth Amendment, although there was an unsuccessful challenge to lily-white control of the state's Republican Party in 1921.

During the prolonged national convention, Virginia delegates supported favorite son Senator Carter Glass, who had virtually no support elsewhere. Ultimately the nomination went to a compromise candidate in Wall Street lawyer and former United States Ambassador to the United Kingdom John W. Davis of West Virginia. Although West Virginia was a border state whose limited African-American population had not been disenfranchised, Davis did share the extreme social conservatism of Southern Democrats of his era; he supported poll taxes and opposed women's suffrage. In addition, Davis, like Coolidge, favored strictly limited government. At the same time a progressive third-party run was predicted as early as winter 1923–24, and ultimately Wisconsin Senator Robert M. La Follette would be nominated by the “Committee for Progressive Political Action”.

Neither Davis, La Follette, nor Republican nominee, incumbent President Calvin Coolidge campaigned in the state, which was always viewed as certain to go for Davis after having voted Democratic at every election since 1876. A Digest poll at the end of October, which included votes for some candidates not on the ballot, had Davis winning by 22.5 percentage points, a figure which understated his final margin of 29.69 points or a 6.22-point improvement from James M. Cox in 1920. Progressive Party candidate La Follette would relegate Davis to third in twelve states and carry his home state of Wisconsin, but had very little appeal amongst Virginia's restricted electorate, reaching double digits in only four counties and six independent cities. Overall Virginia was La Follette's sixth-weakest state (Note: This excludes Louisiana where La Follette was not on the ballot at all, though he received an undocumented number of votes as a write-in candidate.) after South Carolina, North Carolina, Mississippi, Tennessee and Rhode Island.

Until 2016, this was the last time a Democrat carried Virginia without winning the presidency. This was also the last time that a Democrat who lost the nationwide popular vote won the state until 2024, a hundred years later. This was also the last time that a Democrat won Virginia and a Republican won neighboring West Virginia until 2008, 84 years later.

== Results ==
1924 United States presidential election in Virginia
Party	Candidate	Votes	Percentage	Electoral votes
Democratic	John W. Davis	139,797	62.49%	12
Republican	Calvin Coolidge (inc.)	73,359	32.79%	0
Progressive	Robert M. La Follette	10,379	4.64%	0
Socialist Labor	Frank T. Johns	191	0.09%	0
Totals		223,726	100.00%	12

=== Results by county ===
1924 United States presidential election in Virginia by counties and independent cities
County or Independent City	John W. Davis Democratic		Calvin Coolidge Republican		Robert M. La Follette Progressive		Frank T. Johns Socialist Labor		Margin		Total votes cast
County or Independent City	#	%	#	%	#	%	#	%	#	%	Total votes cast
Accomack County	2,087	85.92%	307	12.64%	32	1.32%	3	0.12%	1,780	73.28%	2,429
Albemarle County	1,383	76.75%	366	20.31%	52	2.89%	1	0.06%	1,017	56.44%	1,802
Alleghany County	589	36.11%	856	52.48%	183	11.22%	3	0.18%	-267	-16.37%	1,631
Amelia County	372	68.89%	153	28.33%	15	2.78%	0	0.00%	219	40.56%	540
Amherst County	1,092	82.29%	129	9.72%	105	7.91%	1	0.08%	963	72.57%	1,327
Appomattox County	952	88.72%	101	9.41%	18	1.68%	2	0.19%	851	79.31%	1,073
Arlington County	1,209	41.39%	1,307	44.74%	405	13.87%	0	0.00%	-98	-3.36%	2,921
Augusta County	1,920	58.81%	1,265	38.74%	78	2.39%	2	0.06%	655	20.06%	3,265
Bath County	404	48.38%	407	48.74%	24	2.87%	0	0.00%	-3	-0.36%	835
Bedford County	1,811	79.64%	432	19.00%	31	1.36%	0	0.00%	1,379	60.64%	2,274
Bland County	604	49.55%	609	49.96%	4	0.33%	2	0.16%	-5	-0.41%	1,219
Botetourt County	1,427	51.82%	1,264	45.90%	61	2.21%	2	0.07%	163	5.92%	2,754
Brunswick County	887	90.33%	65	6.62%	30	3.05%	0	0.00%	822	83.71%	982
Buchanan County	870	44.25%	1,080	54.93%	14	0.71%	2	0.10%	-210	-10.68%	1,966
Buckingham County	623	73.21%	213	25.03%	15	1.76%	0	0.00%	410	48.18%	851
Campbell County	1,468	74.03%	372	18.76%	142	7.16%	1	0.05%	1,096	55.27%	1,983
Caroline County	840	77.56%	223	20.59%	20	1.85%	0	0.00%	617	56.97%	1,083
Carroll County	1,257	41.68%	1,743	57.79%	14	0.46%	2	0.07%	-486	-16.11%	3,016
Charles City County	141	60.78%	82	35.34%	8	3.45%	1	0.43%	59	25.43%	232
Charlotte County	1,006	80.87%	154	12.38%	84	6.75%	0	0.00%	852	68.49%	1,244
Chesterfield County	967	73.04%	282	21.30%	75	5.66%	0	0.00%	685	51.74%	1,324
Clarke County	687	88.19%	76	9.76%	15	1.93%	1	0.13%	611	78.43%	779
Craig County	512	61.46%	300	36.01%	19	2.28%	2	0.24%	212	25.45%	833
Culpeper County	876	79.06%	190	17.15%	42	3.79%	0	0.00%	686	61.91%	1,108
Cumberland County	398	81.72%	61	12.53%	28	5.75%	0	0.00%	337	69.20%	487
Dickenson County	1,618	53.10%	1,294	42.47%	119	3.91%	16	0.53%	324	10.63%	3,047
Dinwiddie County	685	82.53%	122	14.70%	23	2.77%	0	0.00%	563	67.83%	830
Elizabeth City County	698	63.22%	312	28.26%	88	7.97%	6	0.54%	386	34.96%	1,104
Essex County	315	82.03%	60	15.63%	9	2.34%	0	0.00%	255	66.41%	384
Fairfax County	1,586	62.20%	765	30.00%	195	7.65%	4	0.16%	821	32.20%	2,550
Fauquier County	1,277	74.55%	345	20.14%	89	5.20%	2	0.12%	932	54.41%	1,713
Floyd County	515	34.04%	984	65.04%	13	0.86%	1	0.07%	-469	-31.00%	1,513
Fluvanna County	452	73.26%	136	22.04%	27	4.38%	2	0.32%	316	51.22%	617
Franklin County	1,902	63.55%	1,077	35.98%	13	0.43%	1	0.03%	825	27.56%	2,993
Frederick County	1,314	71.92%	484	26.49%	29	1.59%	0	0.00%	830	45.43%	1,827
Giles County	1,319	59.15%	852	38.21%	58	2.60%	1	0.04%	467	20.94%	2,230
Gloucester County	616	84.38%	109	14.93%	5	0.68%	0	0.00%	507	69.45%	730
Goochland County	394	65.89%	164	27.42%	40	6.69%	0	0.00%	230	38.46%	598
Grayson County	1,611	52.37%	1,442	46.88%	20	0.65%	3	0.10%	169	5.49%	3,076
Greene County	285	53.27%	240	44.86%	8	1.50%	2	0.37%	45	8.41%	535
Greensville County	417	72.77%	132	23.04%	23	4.01%	1	0.17%	285	49.74%	573
Halifax County	2,245	84.24%	374	14.03%	45	1.69%	1	0.04%	1,871	70.21%	2,665
Hanover County	732	80.88%	135	14.92%	38	4.20%	0	0.00%	597	65.97%	905
Henrico County	1,052	65.55%	416	25.92%	132	8.22%	5	0.31%	636	39.63%	1,605
Henry County	1,097	64.64%	565	33.29%	35	2.06%	0	0.00%	532	31.35%	1,697
Highland County	508	52.26%	454	46.71%	10	1.03%	0	0.00%	54	5.56%	972
Isle of Wight County	631	76.30%	190	22.97%	6	0.73%	0	0.00%	441	53.33%	827
James City County	173	72.08%	54	22.50%	13	5.42%	0	0.00%	119	49.58%	240
King and Queen County	314	69.47%	134	29.65%	4	0.88%	0	0.00%	180	39.82%	452
King George County	280	55.67%	206	40.95%	16	3.18%	1	0.20%	74	14.71%	503
King William County	372	69.79%	148	27.77%	13	2.44%	0	0.00%	224	42.03%	533
Lancaster County	564	84.43%	90	13.47%	14	2.10%	0	0.00%	474	70.96%	668
Lee County	2,376	48.04%	2,456	49.66%	112	2.26%	2	0.04%	-80	-1.62%	4,946
Loudoun County	1,794	88.33%	152	7.48%	82	4.04%	3	0.15%	1,642	80.85%	2,031
Louisa County	707	67.59%	282	26.96%	57	5.45%	0	0.00%	425	40.63%	1,046
Lunenburg County	686	66.22%	130	12.55%	219	21.14%	1	0.10%	467 (Note: In this county or city where La Follette ran second ahead of Coolidge, the margin given is that between Davis and La Follette)	45.08%	1,036
Madison County	589	60.66%	347	35.74%	35	3.60%	0	0.00%	242	24.92%	971
Mathews County	678	76.78%	195	22.08%	10	1.13%	0	0.00%	483	54.70%	883
Mecklenburg County	1,649	84.30%	286	14.62%	20	1.02%	1	0.05%	1,363	69.68%	1,956
Middlesex County	438	83.75%	78	14.91%	7	1.34%	0	0.00%	360	68.83%	523
Montgomery County	1,142	52.65%	964	44.44%	63	2.90%	0	0.00%	178	8.21%	2,169
Nansemond County	539	82.67%	99	15.18%	13	1.99%	1	0.15%	440	67.48%	652
Nelson County	1,042	72.82%	350	24.46%	36	2.52%	3	0.21%	692	48.36%	1,431
New Kent County	178	63.80%	86	30.82%	15	5.38%	0	0.00%	92	32.97%	279
Norfolk County	1,000	73.05%	289	21.11%	77	5.62%	3	0.22%	711	51.94%	1,369
Northampton County	941	81.19%	180	15.53%	38	3.28%	0	0.00%	761	65.66%	1,159
Northumberland County	589	80.80%	130	17.83%	10	1.37%	0	0.00%	459	62.96%	729
Nottoway County	840	72.35%	181	15.59%	140	12.06%	0	0.00%	659	56.76%	1,161
Orange County	834	78.09%	181	16.95%	53	4.96%	0	0.00%	653	61.14%	1,068
Page County	1,015	49.34%	885	43.02%	155	7.54%	2	0.10%	130	6.32%	2,057
Patrick County	1,138	58.90%	783	40.53%	11	0.57%	0	0.00%	355	18.37%	1,932
Pittsylvania County	2,563	72.08%	880	24.75%	113	3.18%	0	0.00%	1,683	47.33%	3,556
Powhatan County	247	67.12%	110	29.89%	11	2.99%	0	0.00%	137	37.23%	368
Prince Edward County	714	82.73%	140	16.22%	9	1.04%	0	0.00%	574	66.51%	863
Prince George County	279	73.23%	90	23.62%	12	3.15%	0	0.00%	189	49.61%	381
Prince William County	847	72.39%	269	22.99%	52	4.44%	2	0.17%	578	49.40%	1,170
Princess Anne County	690	80.42%	137	15.97%	31	3.61%	0	0.00%	553	64.45%	858
Pulaski County	1,767	53.84%	1,422	43.33%	90	2.74%	3	0.09%	345	10.51%	3,282
Rappahannock County	395	78.22%	89	17.62%	21	4.16%	0	0.00%	306	60.59%	505
Richmond County	340	72.19%	125	26.54%	6	1.27%	0	0.00%	215	45.65%	471
Roanoke County	1,078	57.04%	695	36.77%	115	6.08%	2	0.11%	383	20.26%	1,890
Rockbridge County	1,394	65.38%	680	31.89%	58	2.72%	0	0.00%	714	33.49%	2,132
Rockingham County	2,041	49.38%	1,982	47.96%	100	2.42%	10	0.24%	59	1.43%	4,133
Russell County	2,554	57.03%	1,848	41.27%	73	1.63%	3	0.07%	706	15.77%	4,478
Scott County	2,177	44.32%	2,666	54.28%	67	1.36%	2	0.04%	-489	-9.96%	4,912
Shenandoah County	2,186	48.18%	2,214	48.80%	134	2.95%	3	0.07%	-28	-0.62%	4,537
Smyth County	1,907	45.71%	2,232	53.50%	31	0.74%	2	0.05%	-325	-7.79%	4,172
Southampton County	1,119	79.70%	203	14.46%	82	5.84%	0	0.00%	916	65.24%	1,404
Spotsylvania County	448	60.87%	255	34.65%	32	4.35%	1	0.14%	193	26.22%	736
Stafford County	450	48.44%	433	46.61%	43	4.63%	3	0.32%	17	1.83%	929
Surry County	388	77.29%	72	14.34%	42	8.37%	0	0.00%	316	62.95%	502
Sussex County	607	81.26%	132	17.67%	8	1.07%	0	0.00%	475	63.59%	747
Tazewell County	2,568	46.89%	2,631	48.04%	272	4.97%	6	0.11%	-63	-1.15%	5,477
Warren County	699	78.72%	150	16.89%	38	4.28%	1	0.11%	549	61.82%	888
Warwick County	248	76.78%	58	17.96%	16	4.95%	1	0.31%	190	58.82%	323
Washington County	3,083	51.20%	2,848	47.30%	83	1.38%	7	0.12%	235	3.90%	6,021
Westmoreland County	484	73.89%	157	23.97%	14	2.14%	0	0.00%	327	49.92%	655
Wise County	4,157	50.55%	3,322	40.39%	736	8.95%	9	0.11%	835	10.15%	8,224
Wythe County	1,899	48.12%	1,996	50.58%	49	1.24%	2	0.05%	-97	-2.46%	3,946
York County	305	77.22%	75	18.99%	15	3.80%	0	0.00%	230	58.23%	395
Alexandria City	1,136	57.96%	556	28.37%	266	13.57%	2	0.10%	580	29.59%	1,960
Bristol City	1,036	68.79%	440	29.22%	29	1.93%	1	0.07%	596	39.58%	1,506
Buena Vista City	235	59.95%	149	38.01%	8	2.04%	0	0.00%	86	21.94%	392
Charlottesville City	831	71.64%	218	18.79%	108	9.31%	3	0.26%	613	52.84%	1,160
Clifton Forge City	447	46.90%	225	23.61%	281	29.49%	0	0.00%	166	17.42%	953
Danville City	1,577	70.37%	473	21.11%	187	8.34%	4	0.18%	1,104	49.26%	2,241
Fredericksburg City	558	68.97%	223	27.56%	27	3.34%	1	0.12%	335	41.41%	809
Hampton City	471	76.59%	129	20.98%	15	2.44%	0	0.00%	342	55.61%	615
Harrisonburg City	624	49.13%	631	49.69%	15	1.18%	0	0.00%	-7	-0.55%	1,270
Hopewell City	277	56.42%	206	41.96%	8	1.63%	0	0.00%	71	14.46%	491
Lynchburg City	2,086	74.08%	602	21.38%	128	4.55%	0	0.00%	1,484	52.70%	2,816
Newport News City	1,574	56.56%	917	32.95%	289	10.38%	3	0.11%	657	23.61%	2,783
Norfolk City	5,061	63.87%	2,447	30.88%	411	5.19%	5	0.06%	2,614	32.99%	7,924
Petersburg City	1,331	83.45%	228	14.29%	32	2.01%	4	0.25%	1,103	69.15%	1,595
Portsmouth City	2,206	64.26%	624	18.18%	595	17.33%	8	0.23%	1,582	46.08%	3,433
Radford City	394	48.82%	314	38.91%	99	12.27%	0	0.00%	80	9.91%	807
Richmond City	9,904	73.79%	2,600	19.37%	907	6.76%	10	0.07%	7,304	54.42%	13,421
Roanoke City	3,930	61.07%	1,747	27.15%	755	11.73%	3	0.05%	2,183	33.92%	6,435
South Norfolk City	281	64.01%	134	30.52%	24	5.47%	0	0.00%	147	33.49%	439
Staunton City	1,022	63.52%	549	34.12%	38	2.36%	0	0.00%	473	29.40%	1,609
Suffolk City	557	73.29%	179	23.55%	24	3.16%	0	0.00%	378	49.74%	760
Williamsburg City	196	85.96%	31	13.60%	0	0.00%	1	0.44%	165	72.37%	228
Winchester City	820	65.18%	420	33.39%	18	1.43%	0	0.00%	400	31.80%	1,258
Totals	139,717	62.48%	73,328	32.79%	10,369	4.64%	189	0.08%	66,389	29.69%	223,603

== See also ==
- United States presidential elections in Virginia
