= South Norfolk, Virginia =

Part of the city of Chesapeake, Virginia, US

Coordinates: 36°47′40″N 76°16′20″W

South Norfolk was an independent city in the South Hampton Roads region of eastern Virginia, United States, and is now a section of the city of Chesapeake, one of the cities of Hampton Roads which surround the harbor of Hampton Roads and are linked by the Hampton Roads Beltway.

== History ==
Historical population
Census	Pop.	Note	%±
1920	7,724		—
1930	7,857		1.7%
1940	8,038		2.3%
1950	10,434		29.8%
1960	22,035		111.2%
1920-1960 Population as the City of South Norfolk

Located a few miles south of the larger city of Norfolk along the Southern Branch Elizabeth River, South Norfolk became an incorporated town in Norfolk County in 1919. Within three years, it became an independent city.

In the early 1920s, streetcars ran from Ocean View in Norfolk, to South Norfolk. There was a ferry that docked at the end of Indian River Road and crossed the Southern Branch Elizabeth River to Portsmouth.

The much larger independent city of Norfolk expanded rapidly into the adjacent communities after World War II, primarily by annexing parts of Norfolk County. In the early 1960s, Norfolk sought to annex the last stretch of Norfolk County between the cities of Norfolk and South Norfolk. This would have left South Norfolk completely surrounded by Norfolk. Realizing that this annexation attempt threatened their viability, South Norfolk and Norfolk County decided to merge into a larger independent city. Under Virginia law, cities are immune from annexation.

In 1963, after a referendum in South Norfolk and Norfolk County and with approval from the Virginia General Assembly, South Norfolk and Norfolk County merged to form the independent city of Chesapeake. The new name was also selected through a voter referendum.

== Revitalization ==
The Gateway at South Norfolk was the city's first major redevelopment project generated by the city's South Norfolk Revitalization Plan. When completed, The Gateway at South Norfolk, which will span 6 acres (24,000 m^{2}), will feature 133 condominiums and loft apartments as well as 54,000 square feet (5,000 m^{2}) of retail and office space. Harris-Judah LLC, the builder/developer behind The Gateway at South Norfolk, has announced that affordable, single family homes are available in Chesapeake's South Norfolk area. The homes, which are row-style, are located on B Street and a total of approximately 15 will be available. Construction started in 2010 and ended in 2014 with only one public library and one apartment complex compared to the 133 Harris-Judah LLC promised.

== Presidential election results ==
United States presidential election results for South Norfolk, Virginia
Year	Republican		Democratic		Third party(ies)	
Year	No.	%	No.	%	No.	%
1924	134	30.52%	281	64.01%	24	5.47%
1928	865	84.56%	158	15.44%	0	0.00%
1932	329	34.81%	597	63.17%	19	2.01%
1936	172	17.17%	823	82.14%	7	0.70%
1940	156	14.50%	920	85.50%	0	0.00%
1944	241	20.63%	924	79.11%	3	0.26%
1948	347	27.05%	857	66.80%	79	6.16%
1952	1,098	37.71%	1,782	61.20%	32	1.10%
1956	1,521	42.14%	1,871	51.84%	217	6.01%
1960	1,341	38.09%	2,155	61.20%	25	0.71%

== See also ==
- Chesapeake, Virginia
- Political subdivisions of Virginia § Boroughs
- Norfolk County, Virginia
- Former counties, cities, and towns of Virginia
- New Norfolk County, Virginia (1636–1637)
- Lower Norfolk County, Virginia (1637–1691)
- Norfolk County (1691–1963)
