= Battle of Craney Island =

1813 battle of the War of 1812

Coordinates: 36.94605°N 76.35360°W

- Part of the War of 1812
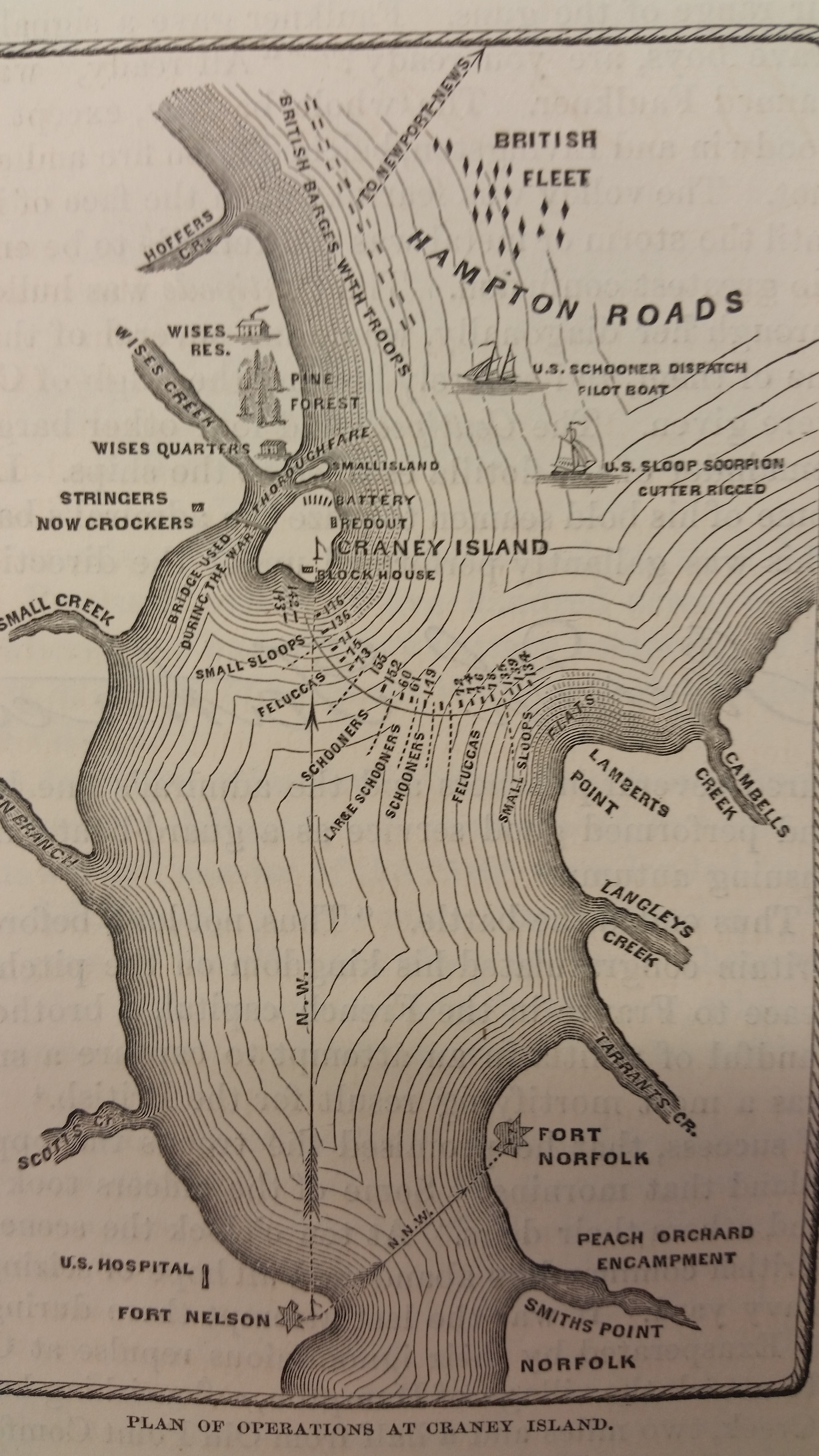
- Battle of Craney Island
Date	June 22, 1813
Location	Craney Island, near Norfolk and Portsmouth, Virginia
Result	American victory

Belligerents
United Kingdom	United States

Commanders and leaders
(United Kingdom of Great Britain and Ireland) George Cockburn (United Kingdom of Great Britain and Ireland) John Borlase Warren	(United States) Robert B. Taylor

Strength
2,500 Infantry and Marines Company of French Royalists	596 Infantry, Marines and Sailors; 91 artillery pieces

Casualties and losses
3 killed 16 wounded 62 missing	None

The Battle of Craney Island was fought on June 22, 1813 during the War of 1812. British forces under George Cockburn and John Borlase Warren attempted an amphibious landing on Craney Island, Virginia but were repulsed by defending American troops under Robert B. Taylor. The battle prevented Norfolk and Portsmouth, two major hubs of American commerce, from coming under British attack.

== Background ==
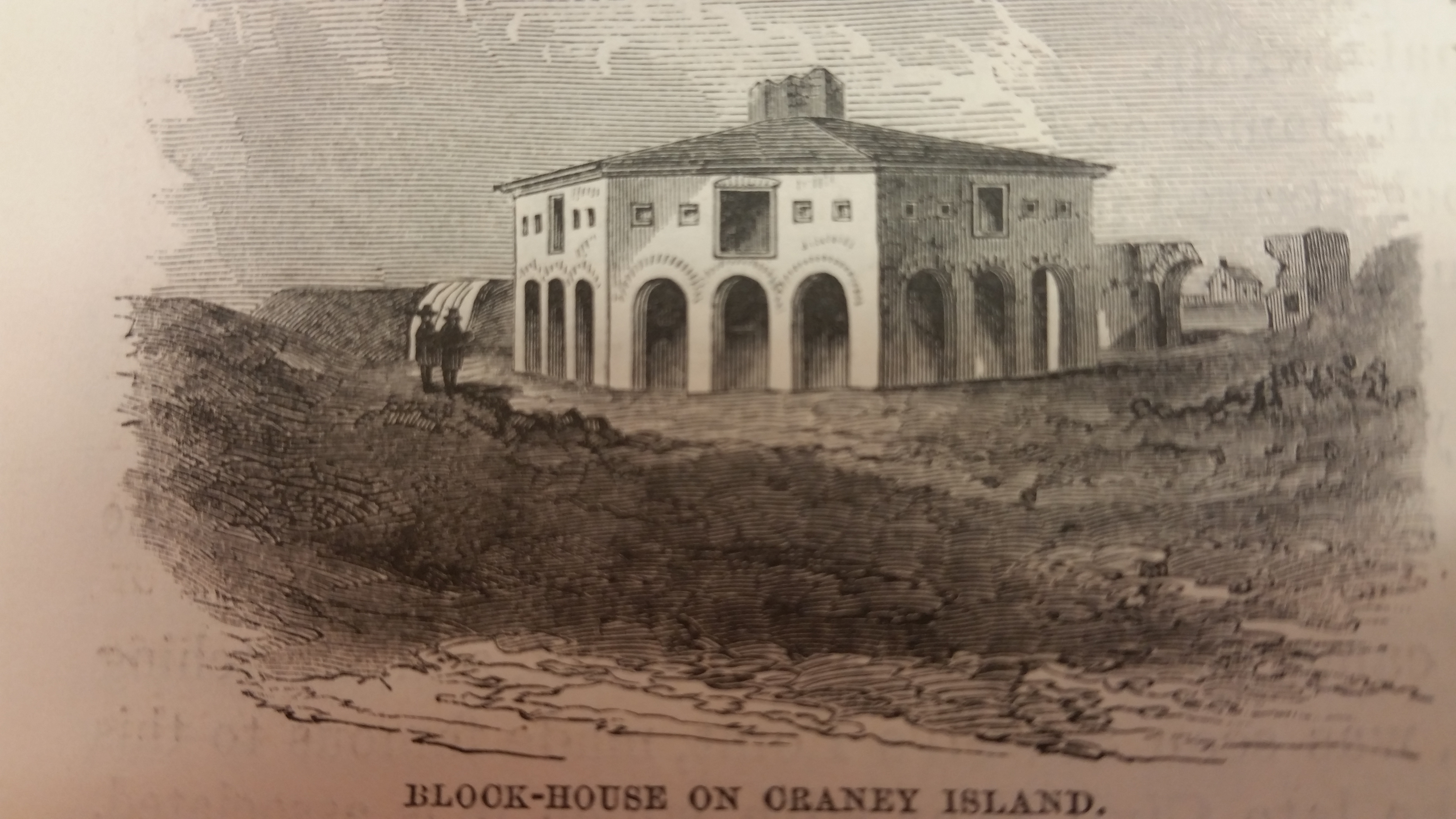
Craney Island Blockhouse during the War of 1812

Admiral Sir George Cockburn commanded a British fleet blockading the Chesapeake Bay. In early 1813, Cockburn and Admiral Sir John B. Warren planned to attack the Gosport Shipyard in Portsmouth and capture the frigate U.S.S. Constellation. Brigadier General Robert B. Taylor commanded the Virginia Militia in the Norfolk area. Taylor hastily built defenses around Norfolk and Portsmouth, but he had no intentions of letting the British penetrate as far as those two cities. Instead Taylor commandeered several ships and created a chain barrier across the Elizabeth River between Fort Norfolk and Fort Nelson. He next built the Craney Island Fort on the island of the same name at the mouth of the Elizabeth River near Hampton Roads. Since the Constellation was already penned up in the Chesapeake because of the British blockade, the ship's crew was used to man some of the redoubts on the island. In all, 596 Americans were defending the fortifications on Craney Island.

== Battle ==
On the morning of June 22, 1813, a British landing party of 700 Royal Marines and soldiers of the 102nd Regiment of Foot along with a company of Independent Foreigners came ashore at Hoffler's Creek near the mouth of the Nansemond River to the west of Craney Island. When the British landed, the defenders realized they were not flying a flag and quickly raised an American flag over the breastworks. The defenders fired, and the attackers began to fall back, realizing that they could not ford the water between the mainland and the island (the Thoroughfare) under such fire. British barges manned by sailors, Royal Marines, and the other company of Independent Foreigners then attempted to attack the eastern side of the island. Defending this portion was a company of light artillery under the command of Captain Arthur Emmerson. Emmerson ordered his gunners to hold their fire until the British were in range. Once they opened fire, the British attackers were driven off, with some barges destroyed, and they retreated back to the ships. The Americans captured the 24-oar barge Centipede, flagship of the British landing force, and the commander of HMS Diadem, Sir John Hanchett, illegitimate son of King George III, was severely wounded by a solid shot from a six pounder cannon. (Note: Hanchett (1762-1819) is buried in Ickleton, Cambridgeshire.)

== Aftermath ==
The Americans had scored a defensive victory in the face of a much larger force; Norfolk and the Gosport Navy Yard were as a result spared from attack. Having failed in their attempt to attack Norfolk, Warren and Cockburn moved north for actions in the Chesapeake Bay, including an attempt to attack St. Michaels, Maryland, in August.

Two days after the battle, British forces crossed the Hampton Roads via Craney Island and attacked Hampton, Virginia. 400 Virginian militiamen gathered to oppose them, but were routed by the British and fled through a nearby wood. In the immediate aftermath of the battle, British Major-General Thomas Sydney Beckwith described the actions of the Independent Companies of Foreigners, a British unit consisting of former French prisoners, as "highly conspicuous and praiseworthy". However, the unit proceeded to rob and murder several American prisoners, and after British forces occupied Hampton, the Foreigners dispersed "to plunder in every direction", inflicting "brutal treatment [upon] several peaceable Inhabitants whose age or infirmities rendered them unable to get out of their way". A British officer wrote in his diary that "Every horror was perpetrated with impunity – rape, murder, pillage – and not a single man was punished."

After the raid, several Americans sent letters to the British criticizing the Foreigners' actions during raid. In response, Beckwith replied that their actions were in response to an incident during the battle of Craney Island where three boats containing troops from the Foreigners were stranded by American cannon fire; U.S. forces waded towards the boats to capture them, and Lieutenant-Colonel Charles James Napier later recalled that "One boat with thirty of the foreigners [was] stranded with a shot through her, and the Americans, wading to it, deliberately massacred the poor men!" In response to claims that American forces had committed a massacre, Taylor, "while not denying the firing upon the boats out of general necessity during the action, conveniently noted that the stranded Frenchmen were not deliberately targeted, and found that only one was shot... while attempting to escape." 22 soldiers from the unit were captured by the Americans, "lending some credence to the Americans’ claims." Regardless, "rumours of cold-blooded American brutality enraged the British forces, [with] Napier noting that his own men and the Foreigners took the news particularly badly."

The repulse at Craney Island did not deter the British from further operations in Hampton Roads the next year. That year in 1814, during the Chesapeake campaign, they proceeded up the Chesapeake Bay, as there were no forts guarding the mouth of the bay at the time (this led to the building of Fort Monroe beginning in the 1820s, to close the bay to enemy vessels), routing Admiral Barney's flotilla of gunboats, carrying out the Raid on Alexandria, landing ground forces that bested the US defenders at the Battle of Bladensburg, and carrying out the Burning of Washington. American troops defeated a British landing attempt at Caulk's Field one week later and an assault on Baltimore roughly two weeks after that, ending British incursions in the mid-Atlantic.

== Legacy ==
Three active battalions of the US Regular Army's 4th Infantry Regiment (1–4 Inf, 2–4 Inf and 3–4 Inf) perpetuate the lineages of the old 20th Infantry Regiment, which had elements that participated in the Battle of Craney Island.

Virginia Historical Marker K-258 (The Battle of Craney Island) (at the entrance to Hoffler Creek Wildlife Preserve on Twin Pines Road) commemorates the battle.

== See also ==
- British Invasion of Hampton, Virginia in 1813
