= Fort Nelson (Virginia) =

- Hospital Point, Portsmouth, Virginia
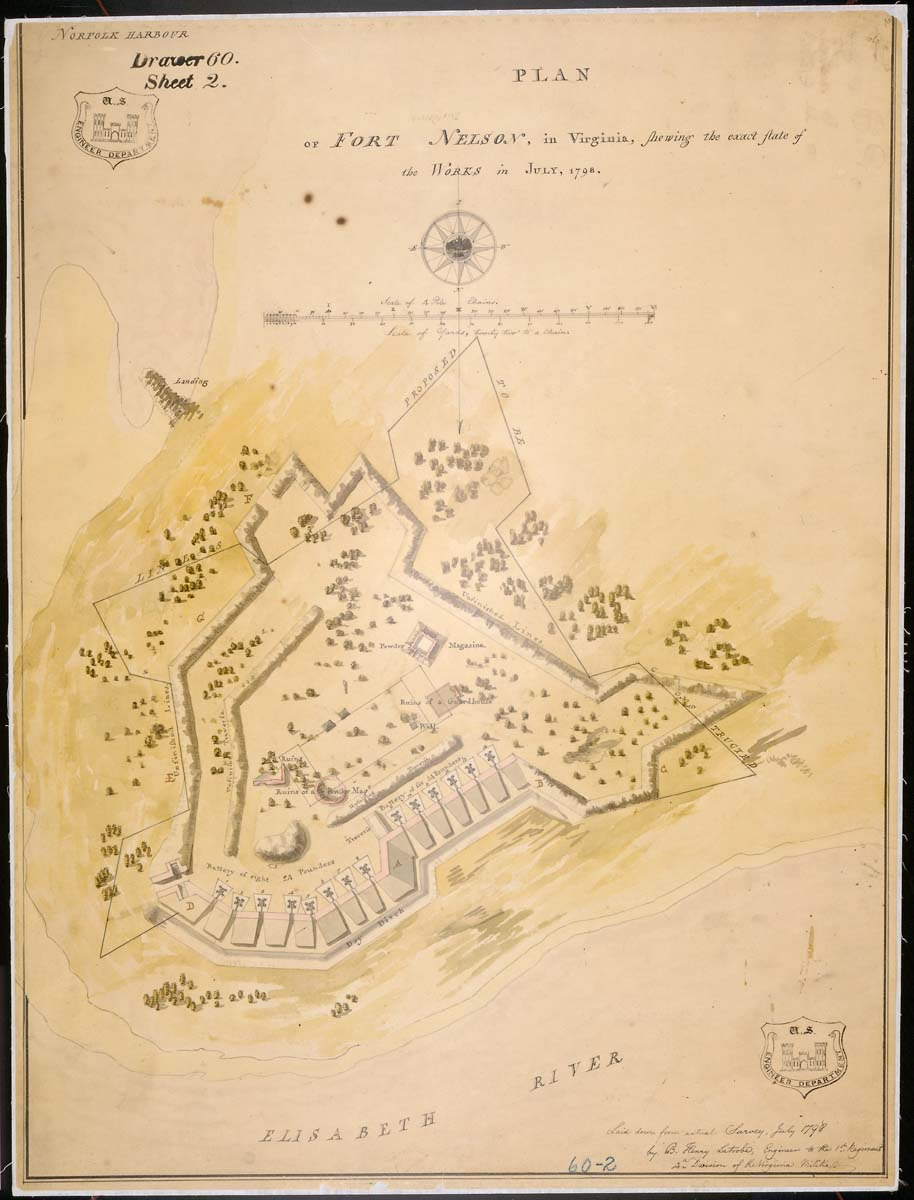
- Plan of Fort Nelson as of July 1798

Site information
- Type: Earthwork
- Condition: demolished

Location
- Coordinates: 36°50′50″N 76°18′15″W

Site history
- Built: 1776; 1794–1795; 1807–1809 (brick and earth fort); 1861 (earthwork)
- Built by: Patriot forces United States Army Corps of Engineers; Confederate forces
- In use: 1776–1824; 1861–1862
- Materials: Brick, earth
- Demolished: 1827 circa 1865
- Battles/wars: American Revolution; War of 1812; American Civil War

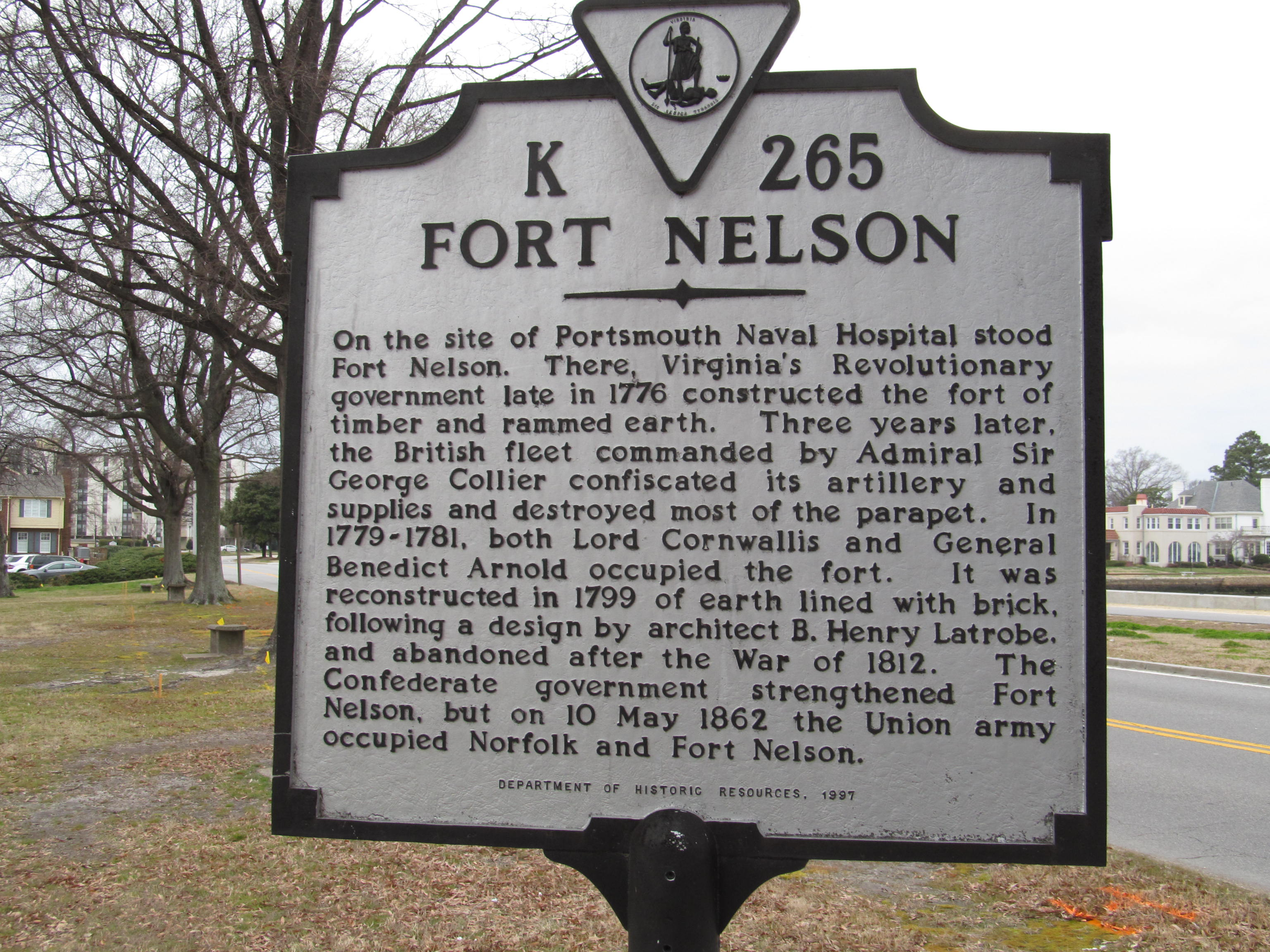
Historical marker for Fort Nelson

Fort Nelson was a fort located on Hospital Point in Portsmouth, Virginia, which is currently the site of the Portsmouth Naval Hospital. The fort was named for Thomas Nelson Jr., governor of Virginia in 1781. It and Fort Norfolk were built to guard the Elizabeth River, including the cities of Norfolk and Portsmouth and the Gosport Navy Yard. The fort was originally built by patriot forces with funding from the Virginia government in 1776 during the American Revolutionary War, but destroyed when the British occupied the area in 1779. A British map shows that they rebuilt the fort by 1781. Following the Revolution, the fort was again rebuilt in 1794 under the first system of US fortifications, was garrisoned in the War of 1812, but was demolished in 1827 to make room for the naval hospital. The fort was again rebuilt by Confederate forces in 1861, but the Confederates evacuated the area in May 1862 and the fort was eventually demolished.

== American Revolution ==
1781 British map showing forts in the Portsmouth area. Fort Nelson is the fort on "Mill Point", with a note that it was built by the rebels a.k.a. Patriot forces.

Late in 1776, Virginia's Revolutionary government constructed the fort of timber and rammed earth. It was built for a garrison of 150 men near previous entrenchments from 1774, with the work supervised by Benedict Arnold, who was with the patriot forces at the time. A fort on the future site of Fort Norfolk was also built across the river. In 1779, a British fleet commanded by Admiral Sir George Collier confiscated its artillery and supplies and destroyed most of the parapet; the garrison evacuated the fort before it was captured. During 1781, both Benedict Arnold (having defected to the British) and Lord Cornwallis occupied the fort. A 1781 British map of fortifications erected by them on the Elizabeth River indicates that they rebuilt Fort Nelson, and shows a fort on the future site of Fort Norfolk.

== Construction and War of 1812 ==
The fort was reconstructed in 1794 as an earthwork bastion fort under what was later termed the first system of US fortifications. Fort Norfolk was built at the same time to create a crossfire with Fort Nelson on enemy ships in the Elizabeth River. In 1795 Captain Richard S. Blackburn's company was being formed in the Norfolk area, and by 1799 garrisoned both Fort Norfolk and Fort Nelson. In 1802–1804 the fort was again rebuilt of earth lined with brick, to a design by architect B. Henry Latrobe as part of what was later termed the second system of US fortifications. The work was initially supervised by Major Decius Wadsworth, and the rebuilt fort had a capacity of 37 guns with barracks for one company.

In 1807 the Chesapeake–Leopard affair off Hampton Roads caused a heightened state of alert at Fort Nelson, then commanded by Captain John Saunders. Heavy mortars were ordered transferred from Newport, Rhode Island to the fort. The Army's report on fortifications in December 1808 stated that Fort Nelson had been strengthened and materials for a new battery at Hospital Point had been procured. By the end of 1809 the fort was "supported by half bastions" (probably the new battery) and mounted 33 guns.

Although Fort Nelson itself never saw conflict, it was garrisoned during the War of 1812. An elongated chain was stretched from Fort Norfolk to Fort Nelson in order to prevent the British fleet from attacking Gosport Navy Yard, Norfolk, and/or Portsmouth. In the main action of the war in the Norfolk area, the British were repulsed in the Battle of Craney Island and did not enter Norfolk. However, they proceeded up Chesapeake Bay to burn Washington, D.C. and unsuccessfully attack Baltimore, as there were no forts guarding the mouth of the bay at the time. This led to the building of Fort Monroe beginning in the 1820s, to close the bay to enemy vessels. This made the Elizabeth River forts obsolete. Fort Nelson was abandoned in 1824 and torn down in 1827 to make room for the naval hospital; reportedly much of the fort's brick was re-used in building the hospital.

== American Civil War ==
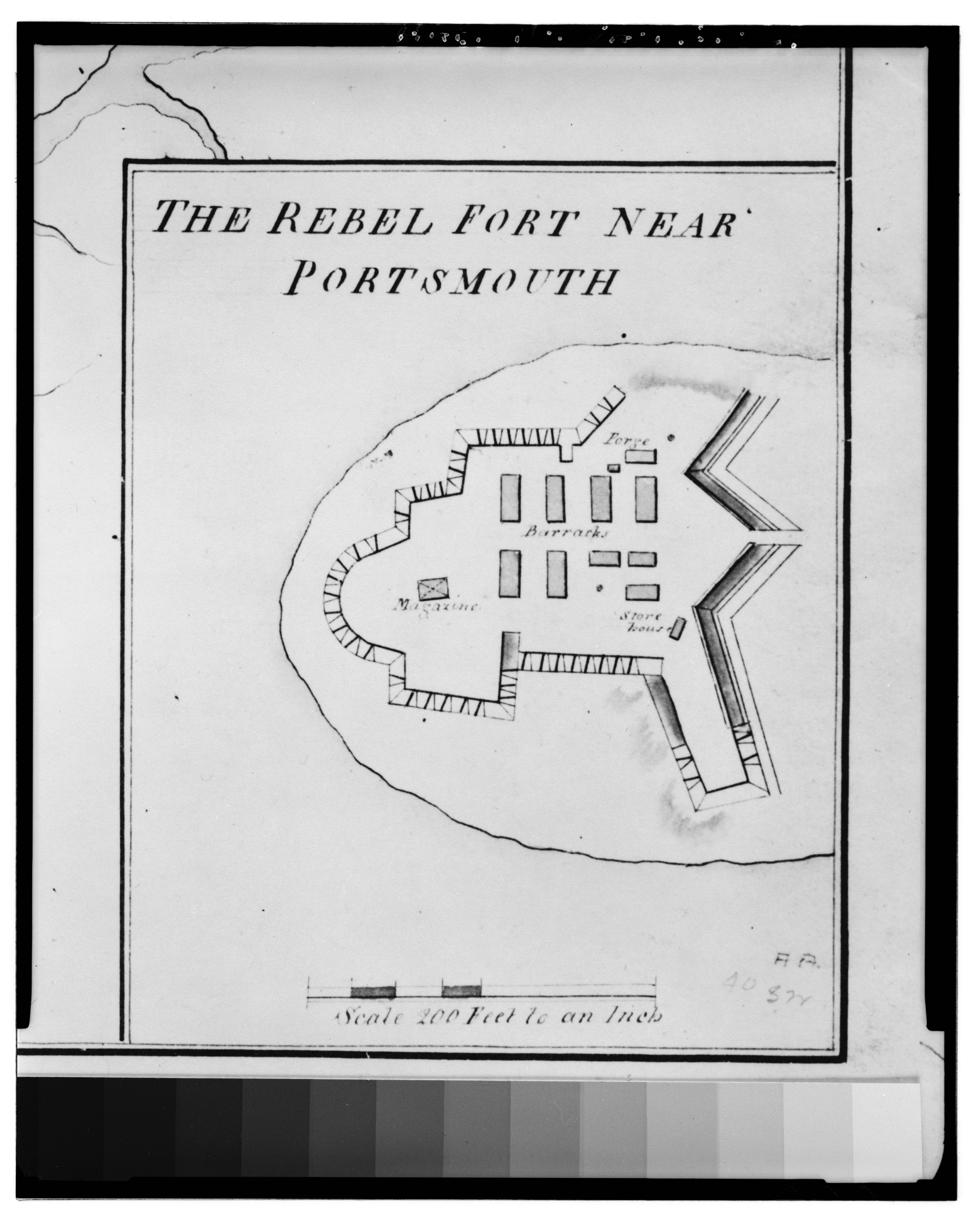
Drawing circa 1886 of Fort Nelson

During the Civil War, the Confederacy occupied Fort Nelson in April 1861, and the Confederate government rebuilt the fort as an 18-gun battery. However, Fort Nelson came under federal control on 10 May 1862, when the Union army, under the leadership of Major General John E. Wool, occupied the Norfolk area following a Confederate withdrawal. It is unclear when the fort was abandoned and demolished, probably in 1865 after the Civil War ended.

== Present ==
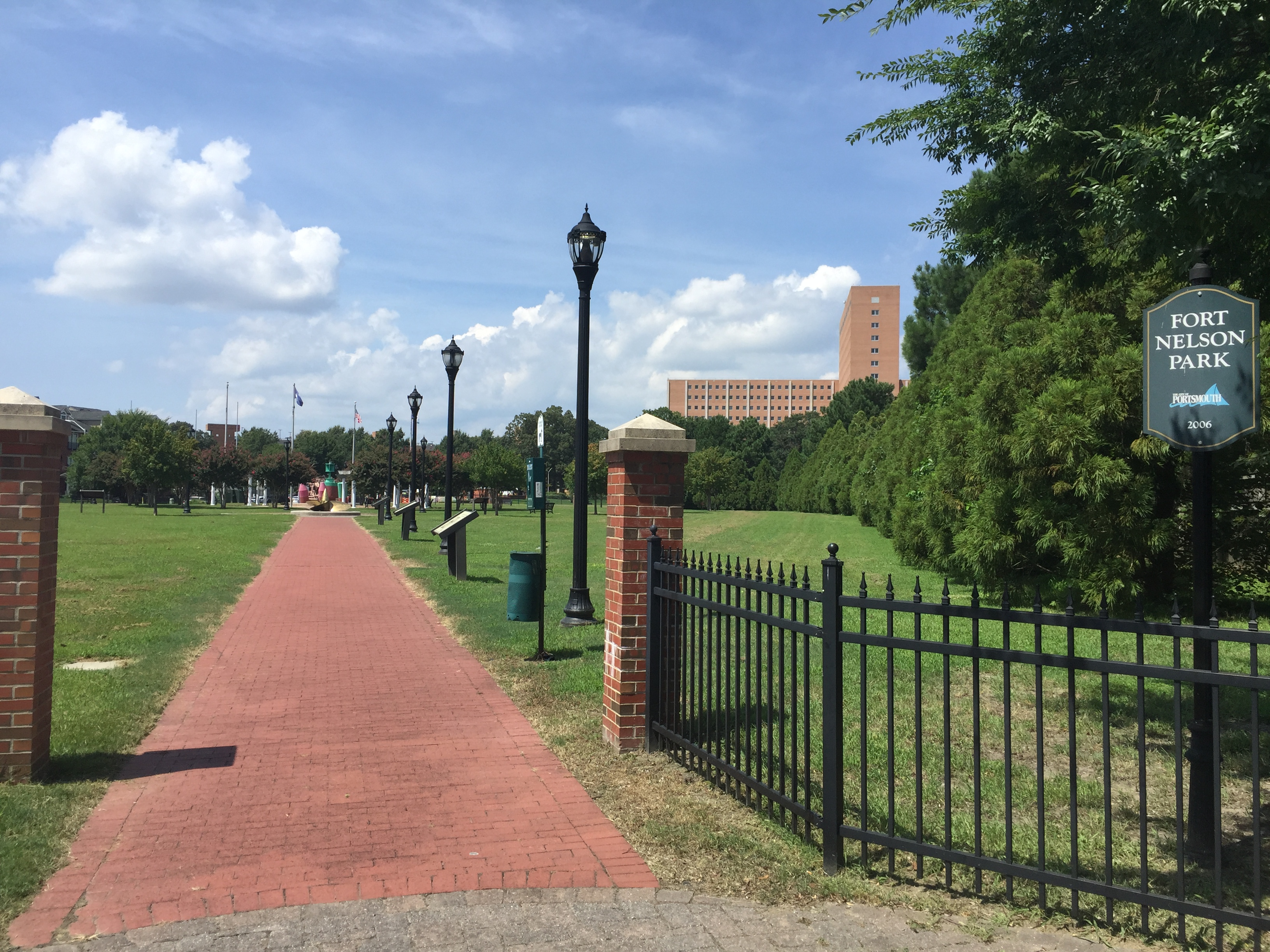
Fort Nelson Park in Portsmouth, near the site of the historic fort

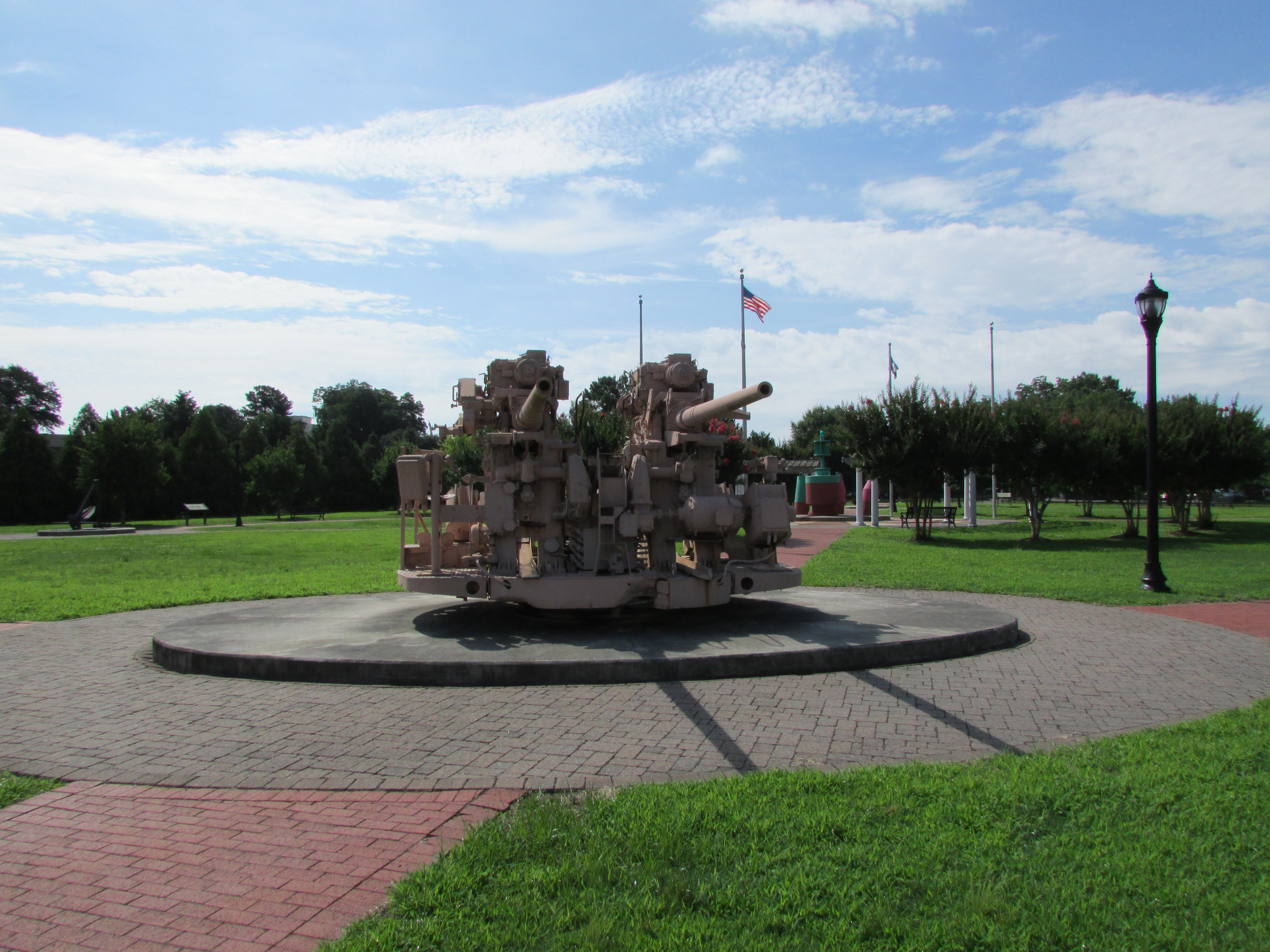
Antiaircraft gun mount in Fort Nelson Park

No trace of the fort remains today. In 2006 Fort Nelson Park was opened on the site of a Civil War-era gasworks, south of the hospital property and some distance from Hospital Point, which is in the northeastern part of the hospital property. The park commemorates the fort in a publicly accessible area. The park has several naval guns and other nautical items. The Fort Nelson Chapter of the Daughters of the American Revolution is named for the fort.

== See also ==
- Seacoast defense in the United States
- List of coastal fortifications of the United States
