= Naval Medical Center Portsmouth =

U.S. Navy medical facility in Virginia

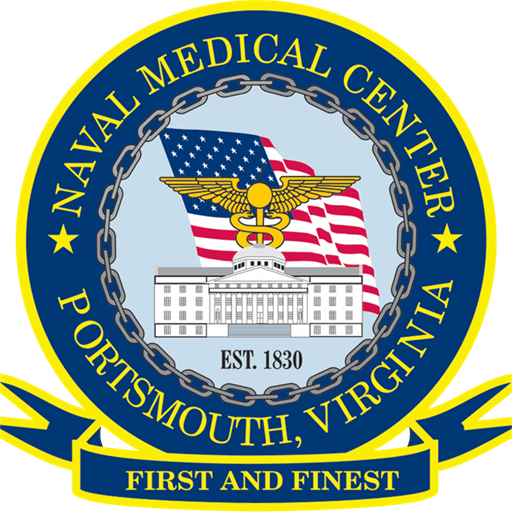
- Command Seal
- Founded: 1827
- Country: United States
- Branch: United States Navy
- Type: Hospital
- Part of: Naval Medical Forces Atlantic, Bureau of Medicine and Surgery
- Mottos: First and Finest
- Decorations: Meritorious Unit Commendation
- Website: portsmouth.tricare.mil

Commanders
- Commanding Officer: Captain Kim P. Shaughnessy-Granger
- Executive Officer: Captain Justin Lafreniere
- Portsmouth Naval Hospital
- U.S. National Register of Historic Places
- Virginia Landmarks Register
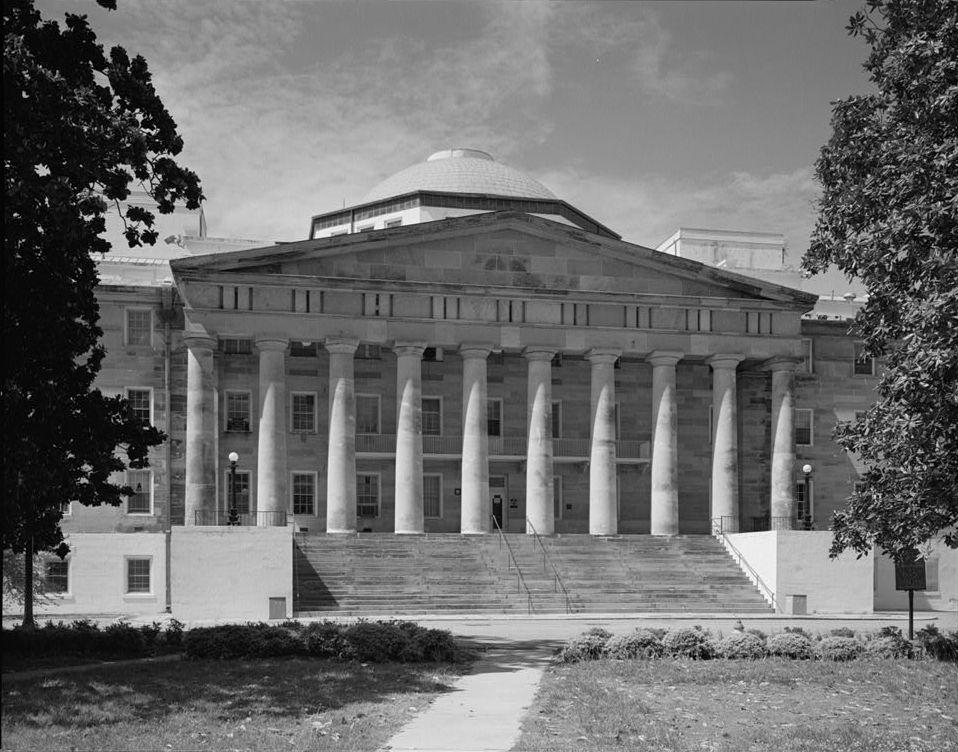
- U.S. Naval Hospital, Portsmouth, VA (1827), John Haviland, architect.

- Location within Virginia Location within the United States
- Location: On Hospital Point at Washington and Crawford Sts., Portsmouth, Virginia
- Coordinates: 36°50′51″N 76°18′17″W
- Area: 20 acres (8.1 ha)
- Built: 1832
- Architects: Haviland, John; Wood, Don & Deming
- NRHP reference No.: 72001516
- VLR No.: 124-0036

Significant dates
- Added to NRHP: April 13, 1972
- Designated VLR: November 16, 1971

The Naval Medical Center Portsmouth (NMCP), formerly Naval Hospital Portsmouth, and originally Norfolk Naval Hospital, is a United States Navy medical center in Portsmouth, Virginia, United States. It is the oldest continuously running hospital in the Navy medical system.

== History ==
The historic Portsmouth Naval Hospital building was designed by architect John Haviland (1792–1852) and built in 1827. It is a three-story granite and Freestone building on a 12-foot (3.7 m) basement. Its form is that of a hollow rectangle, measuring 172 feet (52 m) wide by 192 feet (59 m) deep. The front facade features a 92 feet (28 m) wide Doric order portico with ten columns. The building's interior was reconstructed in 1907, and a shallow dome was added to the roof. Located on the property are a contributing marker erected by Haviland over the grave of Major John Saunders, one time commander of Forts Nelson and Norfolk, who died March 15, 1810; and a memorial cannon commemorating Fort Nelson. Fort Nelson, now demolished, was near the hospital's site.

The hospital staff has a long tradition of providing service to the fleet. In the summer of 1832 during a massive cholera outbreak, naval doctors, nurses, and attendants remained on duty caring for patients throughout the epidemic, working heroically to check the ravages of the disease and to allay patients' fears.

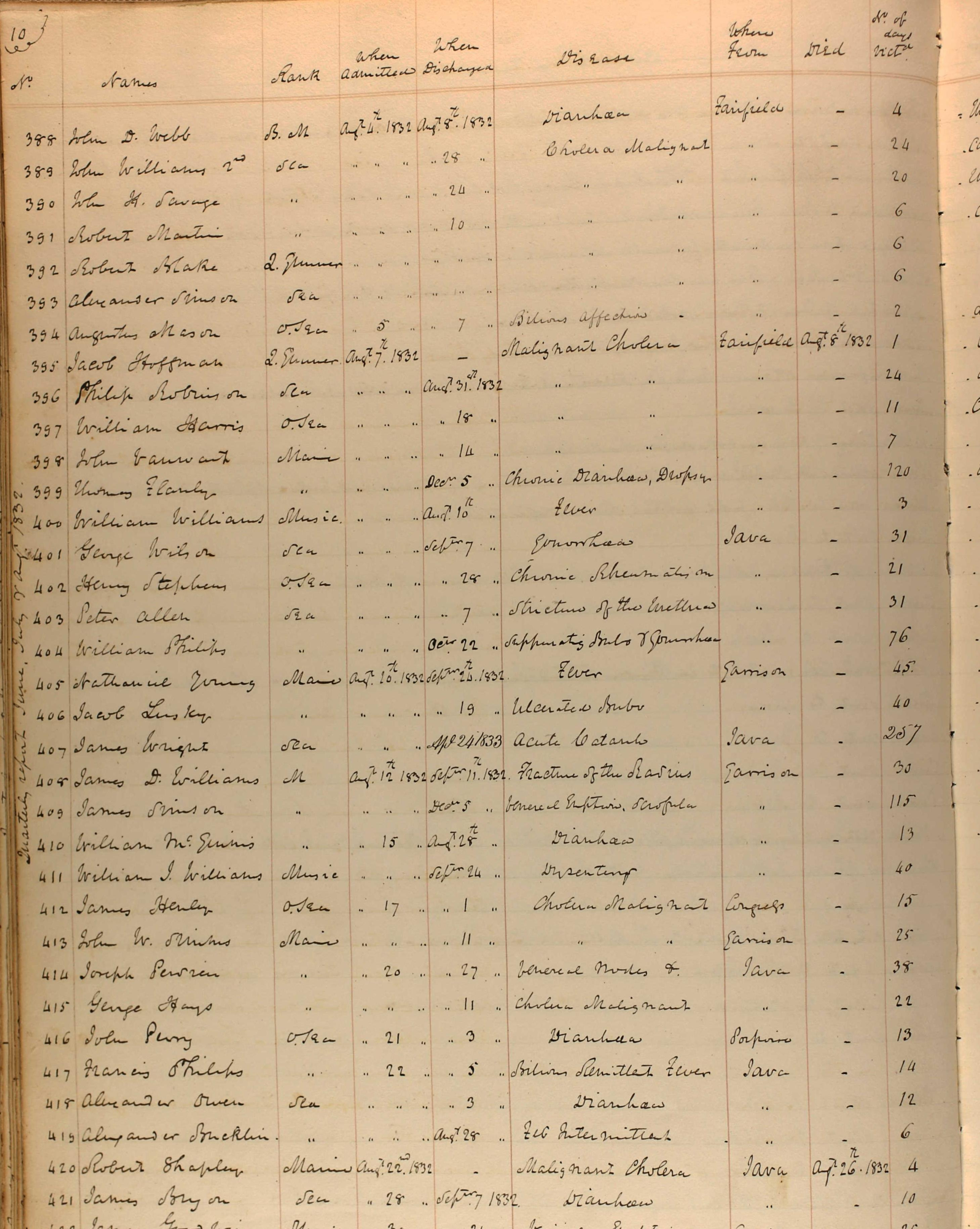
Register of Patients Gosport Naval Hospital August 1832 cholera cases

== Early Navy medicine ==
In 1798, Congress established the "Hospital Fund" to provide medical treatment that formerly had been administered to officers, sailors and marines ashore in sail lofts, storerooms or other work spaces at Gosport Shipyard. By 1821, enough money had been collected to build naval hospitals in key ports. In 1830, the Navy's first hospital opened in Portsmouth. Before then, what is now Hospital Point was the site of Fort Nelson. That fort had protected the area from the British during the Revolutionary War. Several decades later, Fort Nelson fell into disrepair from neglect when Fort Monroe became the protector of the harbor. Construction of the hospital began in 1827. Workers removed more than 500,000 bricks from Fort Nelson and re-used them in the hospital's foundation and inner walls. In 1830, Surgeon Thomas Williamson was ordered to make the hospital ready to receive patients. Dr. Williamson became medical director of the nation's first naval hospital. It is on the National Register of Historical Places.

== Early civilian workers ==
Through the early nineteenth century, both Norfolk (Gosport) Navy Yard and Naval Hospital extensively utilized enslaved labor (see thumbnails 1815 payroll and 1832 hospital muster). On January 2, 1832, in a letter to the Secretary of the Navy, Commodore Lewis Warrington confirmed enslaved labor at the hospital. Warrington stated, "I knew that for ten years, that mode has been pursued without complaint or representation against it. In that time several Surgeons attached to the Hospital and several captains in command of the Yard all of whom acquiesced in it." In a January 5, 1832, followup Warrington clarified that the hospital's female enslaved workers and their children had separate sleeping quarters."[In] assigning reasons for the employment of Washers [laundresses] at the Hospital, I omitted to state that they were fixed in an outhouse at a considerable distance from the establishment and had no intercourse with it, but such as was allowed by the medical officer, consequently neither they nor their children could occasion any inconvenience or produce any irregularity." Most of the staff took their meals (victualed) at the hospital. The enslaved workers and probably the steward Samuel McFall (white) and doorkeeper William Fell (white) lived on the grounds. At the hospital enslaved African Americans worked in wide variety of occupations as nurses, attendants, hospital cooks, washers/laundresses, boatmen and gravediggers. In 1832 Madeline Flanders (see thumbnail) was the first woman listed as a hospital nurse.

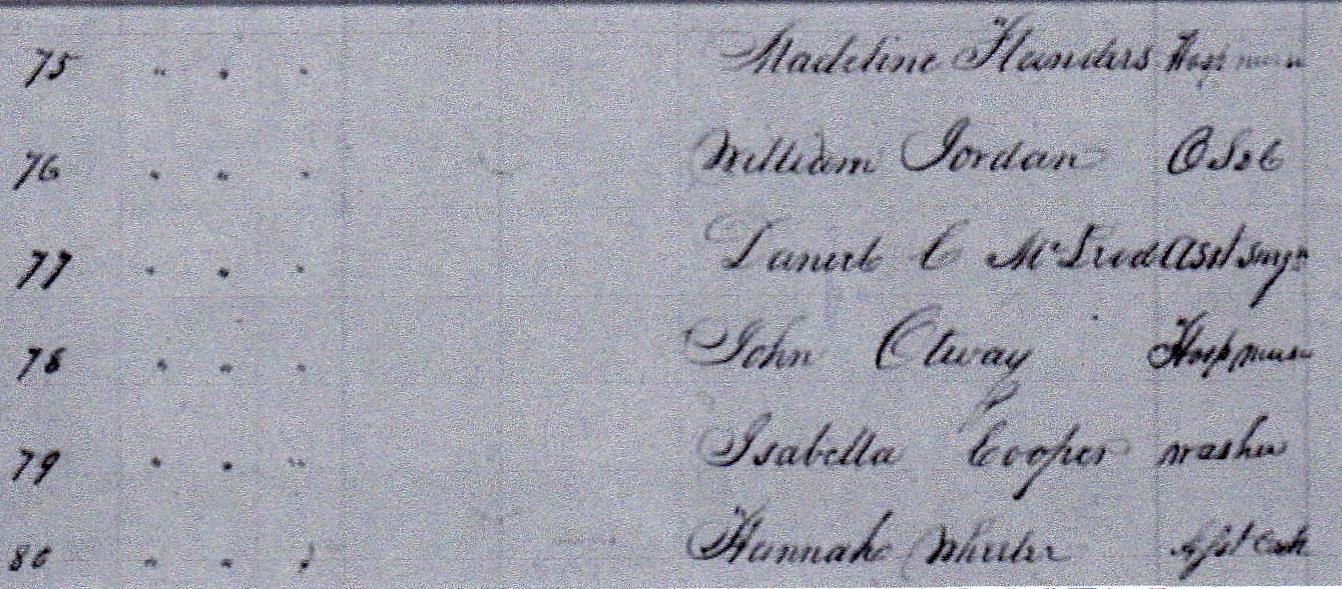
1832 hospital muster enumerating Madeline Flanders nurse and other early Gosport (Norfolk) Naval Hospital employees

=== Yellow fever ===
In June 1855, the steamer USS Franklin put into Norfolk after sailing from the West Indies. Mosquitoes carrying yellow fever escaped when the vessel docked. As the mosquitoes spread, the local population quickly succumbed to the disease. Two months later, with 20 to 70 citizens a day being stricken, representatives of Portsmouth appealed to the Navy to help treat townspeople. The hospital was then opened to the local population and 587 citizens were treated. In appreciation, the Common Council of Portsmouth presented gold medals to six naval surgeons.

=== Navy's First Corps School ===
In 1898, President William McKinley established the Navy Hospital Corps. The first Navy Corps School graduation took place at Portsmouth Naval Hospital in 1902 when 28 students completed the course. The lifesaving record of the corps while caring for the sick and wounded during battle and peacetime has made it one of the most decorated among the military services.

=== Navy Nurse Corps ===
Congress created the Navy Nurse Corps in 1908, allowing women to perform duties that previously had been done by men. They held no rank and were titled, "nurse". The first 20 to graduate were known as the "Sacred Twenty", and of them, three reported for duty at Portsmouth in 1909. Among them was Lenah Higbee, who became Chief Nurse at Portsmouth, and later was the second Superintendent of Nurses for the U.S. Navy. In 1964, male nurses were allowed in the corps.

== Wartime ==
=== War of 1812 ===
Lydia Cypis was the first female hospital nurse at Norfolk Station Hospital. She served in the War of 1812 and during the years 1810 to 1814. Nurse Cypis was probably enslaved as there no documentation of the Naval Hospital ever hiring free women, white or black, prior to the Civil War. Her pay was $5.00 per month and this went to the slaveholder.

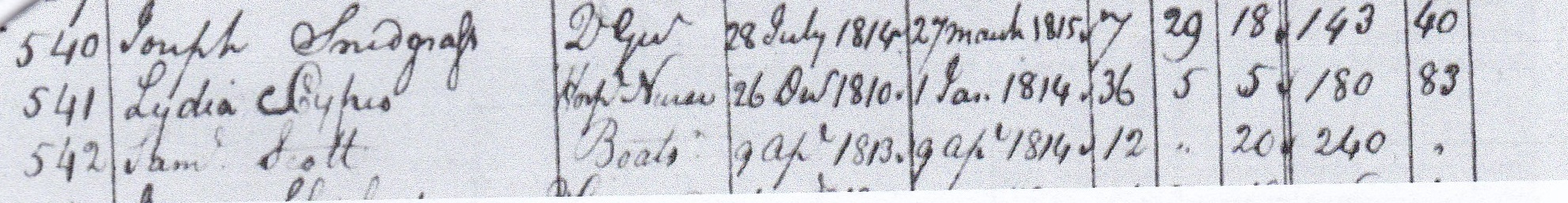
Lydia Cypis, Hospital Nurse, Norfolk Station, employee number 541, service October 26, 1810, to January 1, 1814, served during War of 1812.

=== Civil War ===
Virginia seceded from the Union on April 17, 1861. On April 20, the Governor ordered the 3rd Virginia regiment to occupy and fortify the Naval Hospital grounds. A battery of earthen works was hastily erected on the point and renamed Fort Nelson, after the old Revolutionary War fort. During the Confederate occupation, the hospital served as a medical facility and a fort. The Union retook the area on May 10, 1862, and until the end of the war, the hospital cared for Union soldiers and Sailors. In 1865, the hospital treated nearly 1,300 patients.

=== Spanish–American War ===
After the Spanish defeat at the battle of Santiago, Cuba, in 1898, the sick and injured needed treatment. The hospital ship U.S.S. Solace transported 55 sick U.S. Navy and 48 wounded Spanish sailors to the hospital. The hospital staff treated the Spanish patients not as enemies, but as fellow seamen in distress. After the war, the Spanish Navy praised Portsmouth Naval Hospital for the compassion and humanitarian acts of kindness extended to them and their countrymen.

== Hospital renovation ==
By 1900, 70 years of time and use had taken its toll on the hospital. In 1907, hospital personnel moved patients to tent-covered wooden platforms constructed several hundred yards from the building. Patient care took place in the tents for nearly a year and a half while the hospital was renovated. During this period, two new wings and the Jeffersonian dome were added. The hospital reopened in February 1909. From 1910 to 1940, surgeries were performed under the dome by skylight.

When the United States entered World War I, the hospital was immediately expanded. Several temporary wood-framed buildings were constructed to accommodate the growing number of patients. These buildings included 34 patient pavilions and four Hospital Corps barracks. During a one-month period in 1917, patients increased from 200 to 1,405. The largest monthly admissions were in October 1918 when patients numbered 2,257. Treatment of measles and mumps accounted for half of the patients.

== 1918 influenza pandemic ==
In addition to wartime casualties, the naval hospital also treated large numbers of patients due to the great influenza pandemic of 1918. In the fall of 1918 the influenza pandemic quickly devastated the Naval Training Station at Hampton Roads Virginia where it arrived on September 13, 1918. During the pandemic 3005 naval recruits at the training station contracted the disease and 175 of them died. Most of these recruits were treated at Norfolk Naval Hospital where the hospital general registers reflect the speedy spread of the virus. During the course of the pandemic many in the hospital staff contracted the disease while tending the sick. During the war, 19 Navy nurses died on active duty, over half of them from influenza. Among these were two members of the United States Navy Nurse Corps stationed at Norfolk Naval Hospital they were Hortense Elizabeth Wind USNR (1891–1918) see thumbnail and Ann Marie Dahlby USNR (1892–1918) both died after contacting the disease at the hospital, while treating ailing and dying sailors.

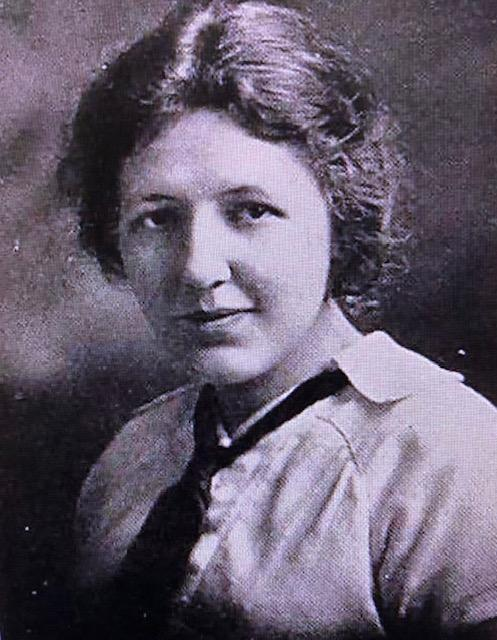
Hortense Elizabeth Wind RN USNR (1891–1918)

== World War II ==
World War II created the need to rapidly expand the hospital in 1941. The $1.5 million program increased the number of hospital beds to 3,441. A dental clinic, ships service, library and a bank were added. The staff—medical officers, nurses, corpsmen, Marines and civilians—swelled to 3,055. On a single day in August 1944, there were 2,997 patients. Between 1937 and 1948, residency and intern programs were established through the Graduate Medical Education system. The sprawling facility escaped post-war downsizing and went on to serve during the Korean War.

== Skyscraper ==
Bldg. 215 (now Bldg. 3) was constructed to provide a modern 500-bed hospital and to centralize the medical departments scattered around the base. Towering seventeen stories, it was the tallest all-welded steel-framed building from New York to Miami. Along with the latest medical equipment, it had a cobbler shop, tailor shop, entertainment auditorium, Navy Exchange and modern galley. In 1973, twelve American prisoners of war from Vietnam were received on the 12th floor, where they were reunited with family and given time to recuperate. It served as the main hospital from 1959 to 1999.

== Charette Health Care Center ==
The Charette Center was dedicated in April 1999 and is the third naval hospital built in Portsmouth. The 1 million square foot, five-story hospital contains 17 operating rooms, 300 exam rooms, 296 beds and 140 special treatment rooms. The center is named for Master Chief Corpsman William R. Charette, who served with the 1st Marine Division during the Korean Conflict. Charette came under hostile fire while helping the wounded. In spite of his own wounds, he continued to treat the injured Marines. He was awarded the Medal of Honor for his gallantry.

== Gallery ==
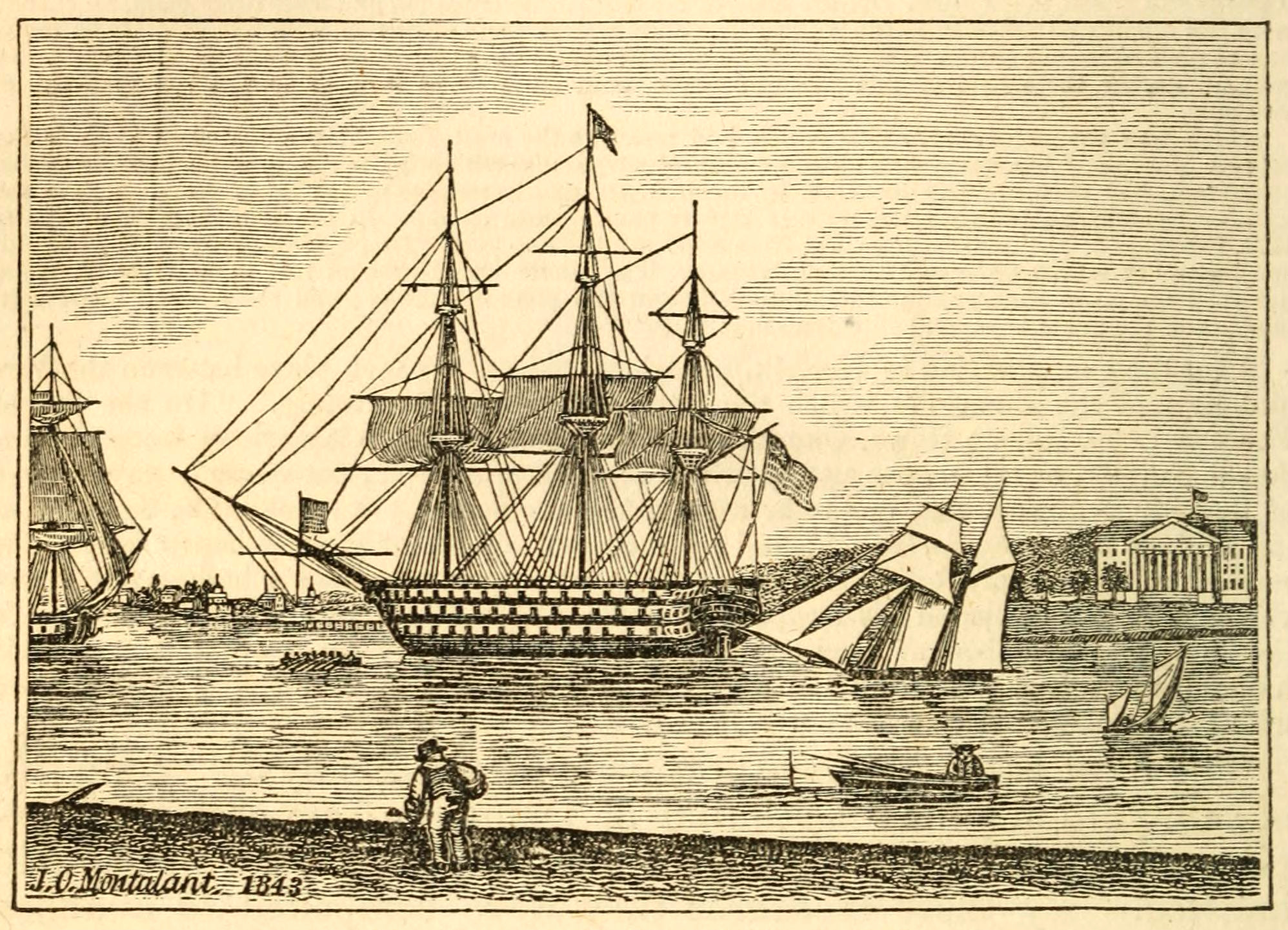
Hospital visible in the background (right) in an 1843 engraving of Portsmouth

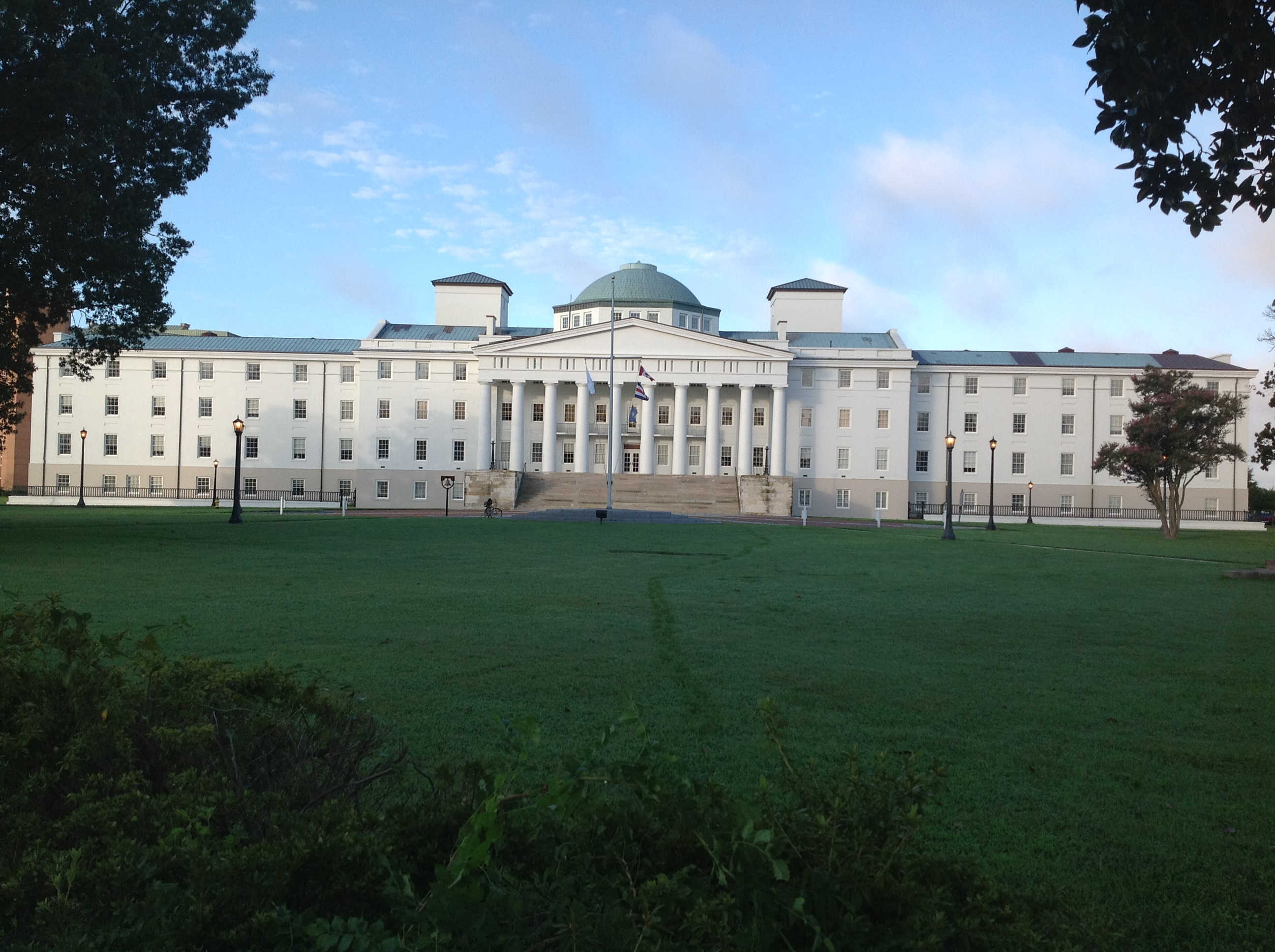
Naval Medical Center Portsmouth, 2012

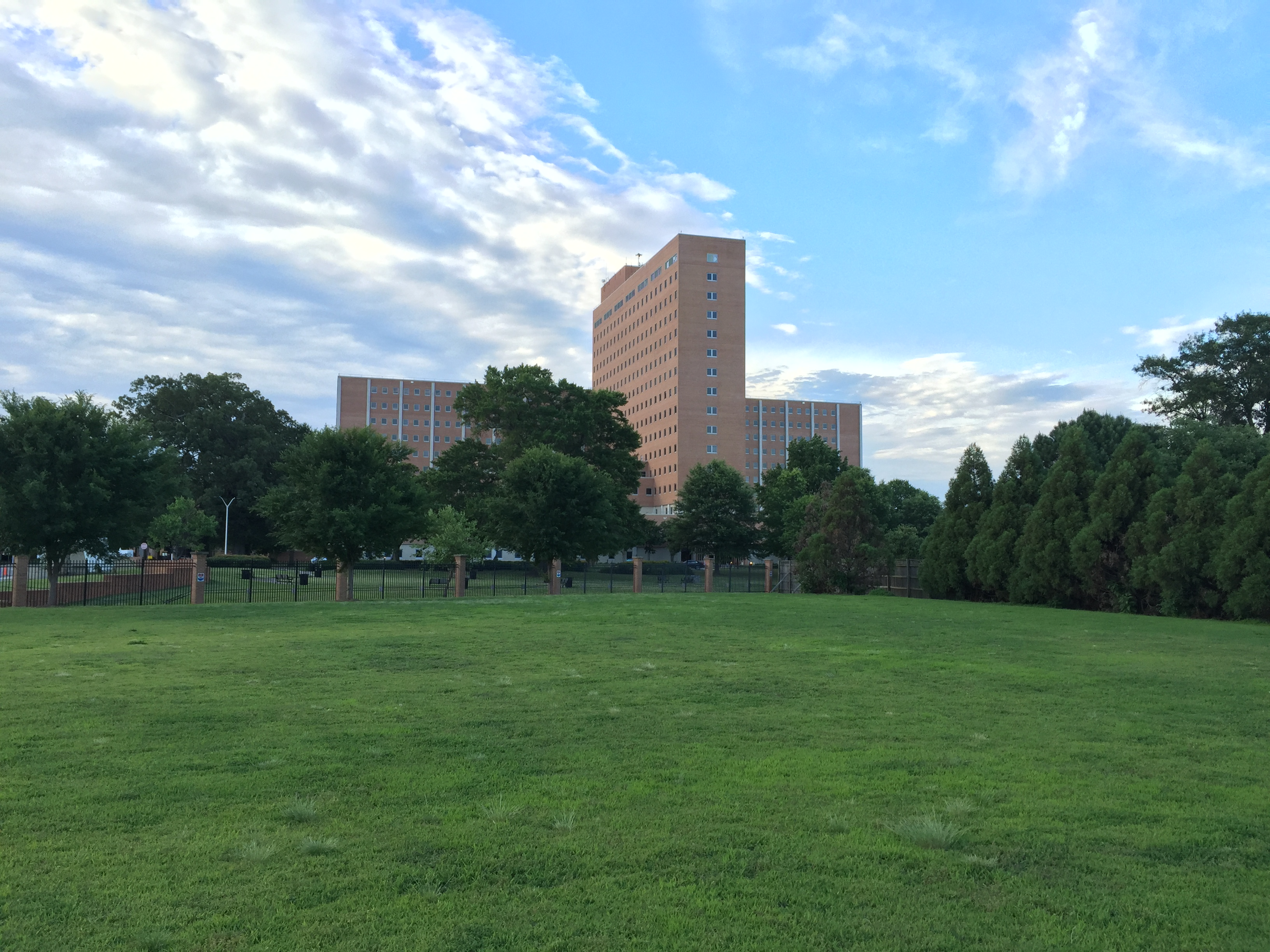
High-rise building in 2016
