= Craney Island (Virginia) =

Island in Virginia, United States

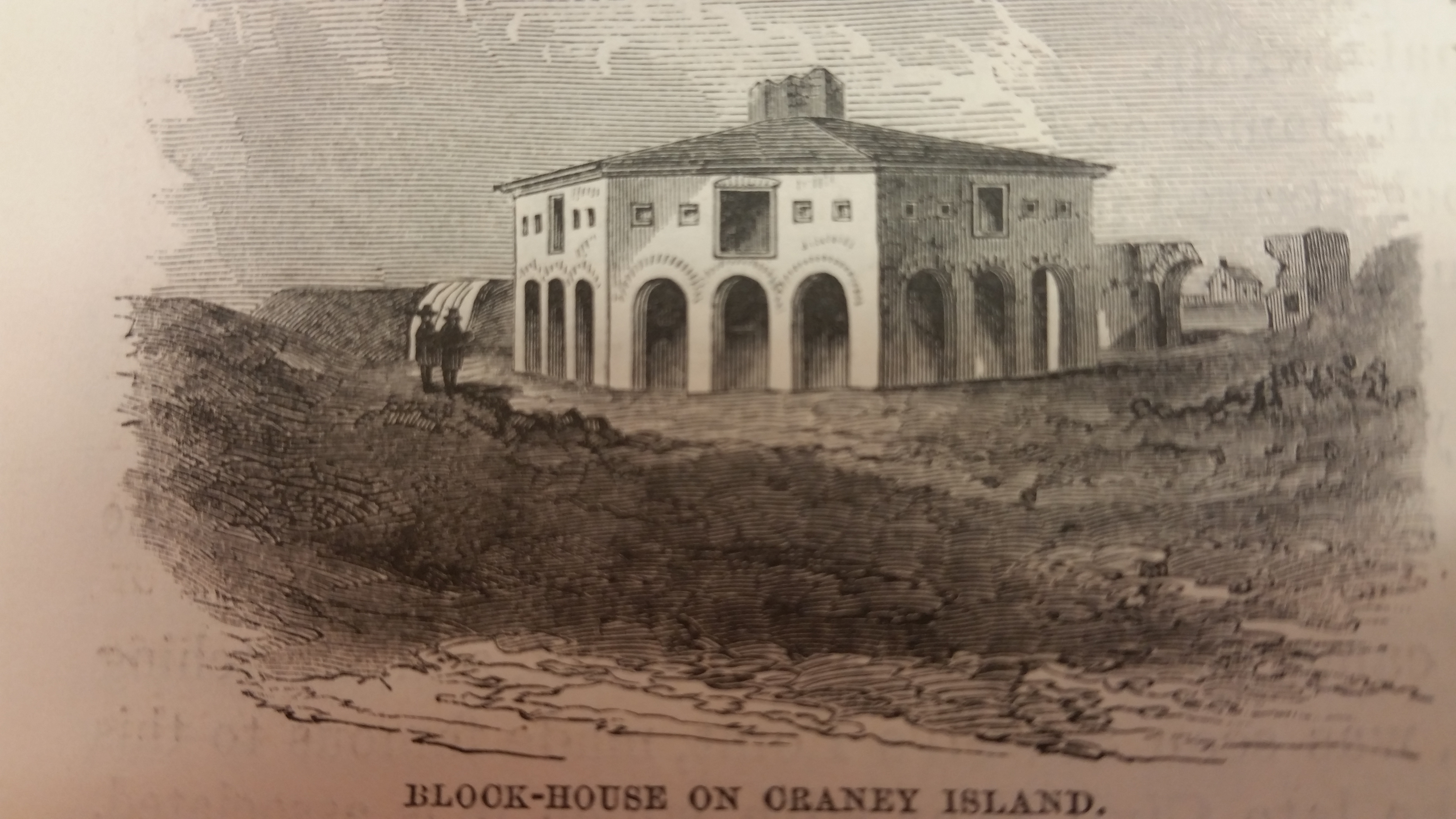
- Craney Island Blockhouse during the War of 1812

- Location within Virginia Location within the United States

Geography
- Location: Elizabeth River
- Coordinates: 36°53′33″N 76°21′34″W
- Total islands: 1

Administration
- United States
- State: Virginia
- City: City of Portsmouth

Demographics
- Population: none

Craney Island Fort
- Craney Island, Portsmouth (formerly Norfolk County), Virginia

Site information
- Type: Earthwork fort
- Controlled by: U.S. Army Corps of Engineers
- Condition: No remains

Site history
- Built: 1813, 1862
- Built by: United States Army Corps of Engineers; Confederate forces
- In use: 1813–1820, 1862
- Materials: Earth
- Battles/wars: War of 1812; American Civil War

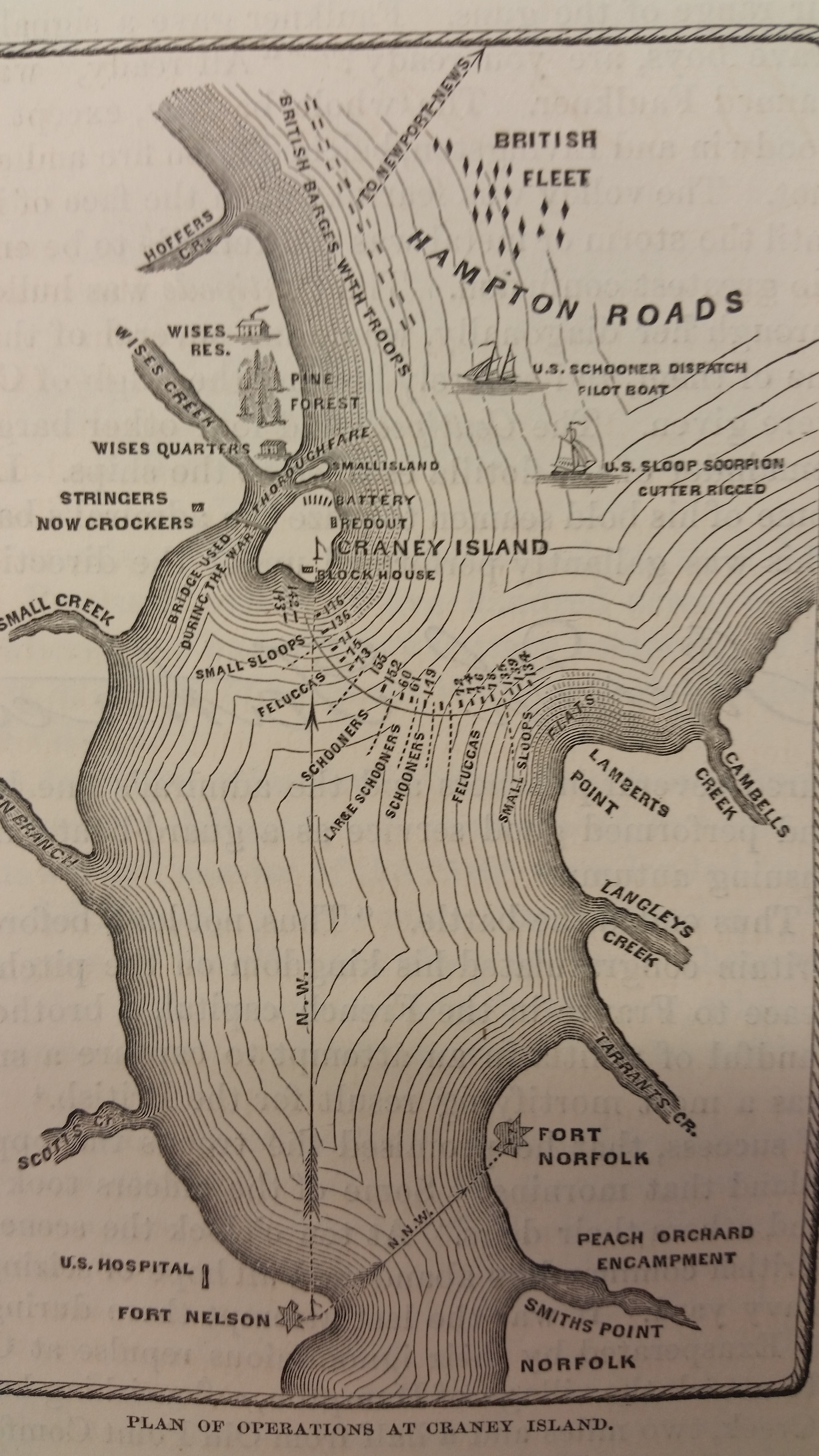
Map of the Battle of Craney Island

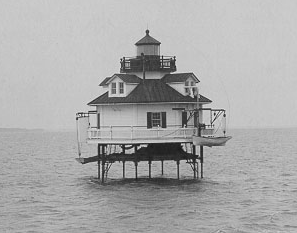
Craney Island Light; this structure stood 1884–1936

Craney Island is a point of land in the independent city of Portsmouth in the South Hampton Roads region of eastern Virginia in the United States. The location, formerly in Norfolk County, is near the mouth of the Elizabeth River opposite Lambert's Point on Hampton Roads. It is home to the Craney Island US Naval Supply Center, managed by the U.S. Army Corps of Engineers.

== History ==
The name "Craney Island" was derived from the fact that the early English settlers on the Elizabeth River in the 17th century were impressed with the great number of what they mistakenly believed to be cranes that inhabited it. Hence the name "Crayne" or "Craney Point." The birds the settlers thought were cranes were actually white and blue herons, still fairly common birds in the Hampton Roads region.

Near the entrance to the navigational channel of the Elizabeth River, Craney Island proved to be of strategic significance during the War of 1812 and the American Civil War.

== War of 1812 ==
During the War of 1812, the federal government built the Craney Island Fort as part of the second system of US fortifications. It was completed in early 1813. The fort had a mile-long earthwork connecting the main seven-gun battery in the southeast with an outer battery and blockhouse in the northwest. A small redoubt was in the fort's center. By June 1813 the fort was armed with two 24-pounder cannon, along with one 18-pounder and four 6-pounders.

On June 22, 1813, the Battle of Craney Island took place. During the battle, the fort was manned by 580 regulars and militia in addition to 150 sailors and marines from the USS Constellation, all under Brigadier General Robert B. Taylor. During the battle, British forces attempted an unsuccessful amphibious landing on the island, suffering 81 casualties. The battle prevented Norfolk and Portsmouth from being attacked by the British. However, two days after the battle British forces attacked and captured Hampton, Virginia, which had no forts at the time.

The repulse at Craney Island did not deter the British from further operations in Hampton Roads the next year. In 1814, they proceeded up Chesapeake Bay to burn Washington, D.C., and unsuccessfully attack Baltimore, as there were no forts guarding the mouth of the bay at the time. This led to the building of Fort Monroe beginning in the 1820s, to close the bay to enemy vessels.

The fort was abandoned some time after 1820.

== First U.S. Lightship, lighthouses ==
In 1820, the first U.S. lightship was established at Hampton Roads. It was first placed at Willoughby Spit, on the south side of the harbor. The weather conditions proved to be too harsh on the seventy-ton vessel there and it was moved to Craney Island where it served until 1859. It was replaced by a lighthouse, which was replaced in 1884 by a hexagonal screwpile lighthouse. The 1884 Craney Island Light served until 1936, when it was replaced by an automated light on the old foundation. In the 1970s this was replaced by a buoy.

== Civil War ==
Early in the American Civil War (1861–1865), the important Gosport Shipyard upstream from Craney Island on the Elizabeth River at Portsmouth fell into Confederate hands and the first Confederate ironclad warship CSS Virginia was converted from USS Merrimack there. The Confederates built a 20-gun battery on the island and berthed the Virginia there. This ship fought the first Union ironclad USS Monitor during the famous Battle of Hampton Roads on March 9, 1862, which was inconclusive as neither armored ship could defeat the other.

Only two months later, as recapture of Norfolk and Portsmouth by Union forces was imminent, on the morning of May 11, 1862, the Virginia was deliberately run aground near Craney Island and burned by the crew to avoid capture.

== Modern times ==
In modern times, Craney Island is an industrial area and has been used as a location for placement of dredged materials since 1957. It is operated by the U.S. Army Corps of Engineers. A major fueling depot for the United States Navy is located adjacent. The Norfolk District of the Corps staff has received recognition for the creation, protection, and preservation of a critical habitat for birds such as the piping plover, least terns, brown pelicans, osprey, and other threatened or endangered species that use the island as a large nesting ground. Audubon Society members have turned the island into a favorite spot for bird watching.

Craney Island is visible to Interstate 664 traffic crossing Hampton Roads on the Monitor–Merrimac Memorial Bridge–Tunnel, which is west of the island. It may also be viewed from Old Dominion University, which is east of the island across the Elizabeth River. The proposed "Third Crossing" of Hampton Roads would cross Craney Island.

Although not a historical name for the ship or station, a lightship named Portsmouth commemorates the first lightship at Craney Island at the Portsmouth Naval Shipyard Museum in Portsmouth, Virginia.

Virginia Historical Marker K-258 (The Battle of Craney Island) (at the entrance to Hoffler Creek Wildlife Preserve on Twin Pines Road) commemorates the battle.
