= Fort Nelson Chapter of the Daughters of the American Revolution Chapter House =

- U.S. National Register of Historic Places
- Virginia Landmarks Register
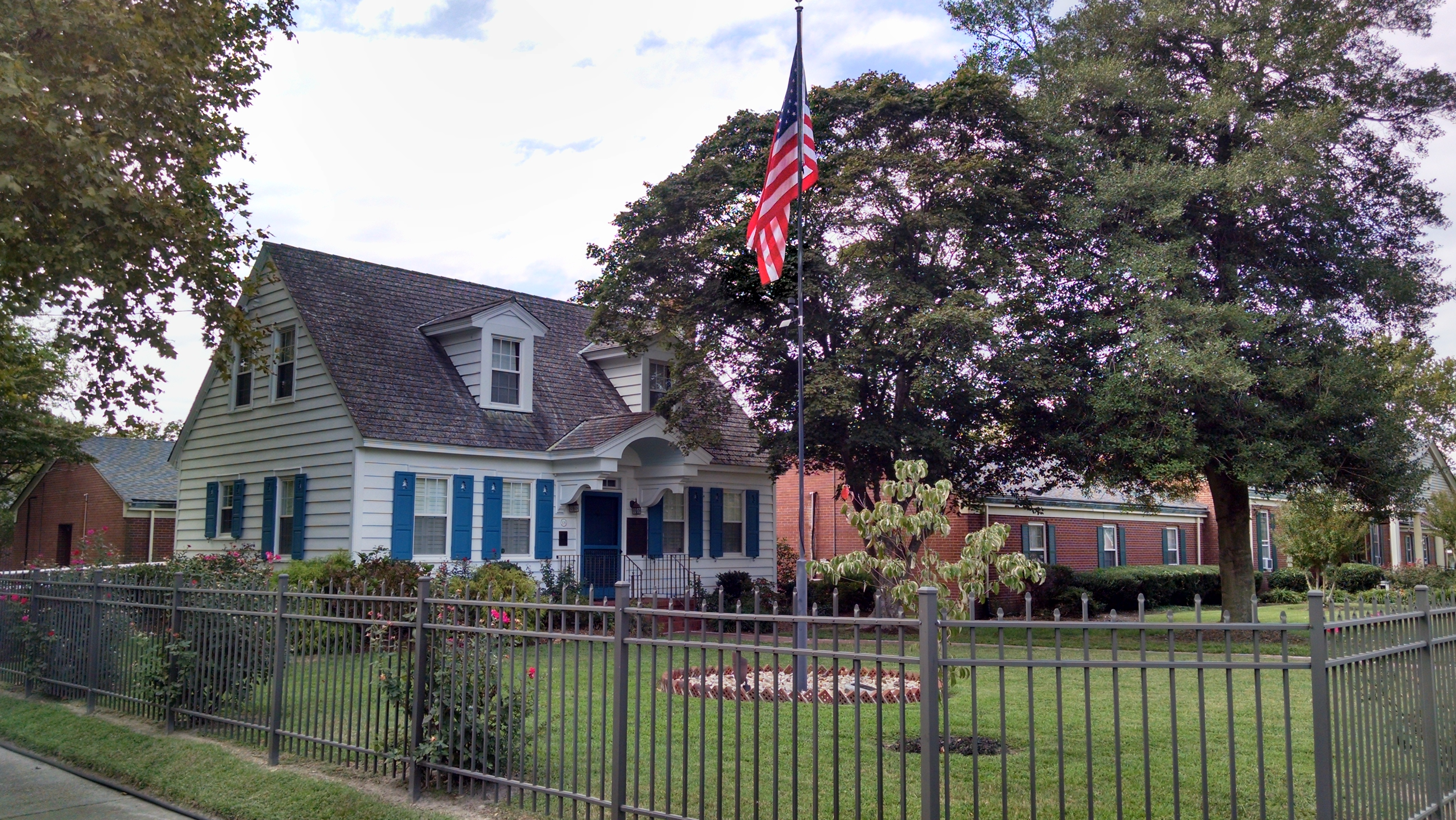

- Location within Virginia Location within the United States
- Location: 506 Westmoreland Ave., Portsmouth, Virginia
- Coordinates: 36°49′59″N 76°21′50″W
- Area: 0.1 acres (0.040 ha)
- Built: 1935
- Architectural style: Colonial Revival
- NRHP reference No.: 07000805
- VLR No.: 124-0042

Significant dates
- Added to NRHP: August 8, 2007
- Designated VLR: June 6, 2007

Fort Nelson Chapter of the Daughters of the American Revolution Chapter House is a historic Daughters of the American Revolution clubhouse located at Portsmouth, Virginia. It was built in 1935, and is a 1 1/2-story, Colonial Revival style frame building. The building appears much like a 20th-century adaptation of a wood-frame Tidewater House. It features a central entrance sheltered by a Classical overhang supported by scrolled brackets.

It was listed on the National Register of Historic Places in 2006.
