= Hoffler Creek =

River in Virginia, United States

Coordinates: 36.896225°N 76.407723°W

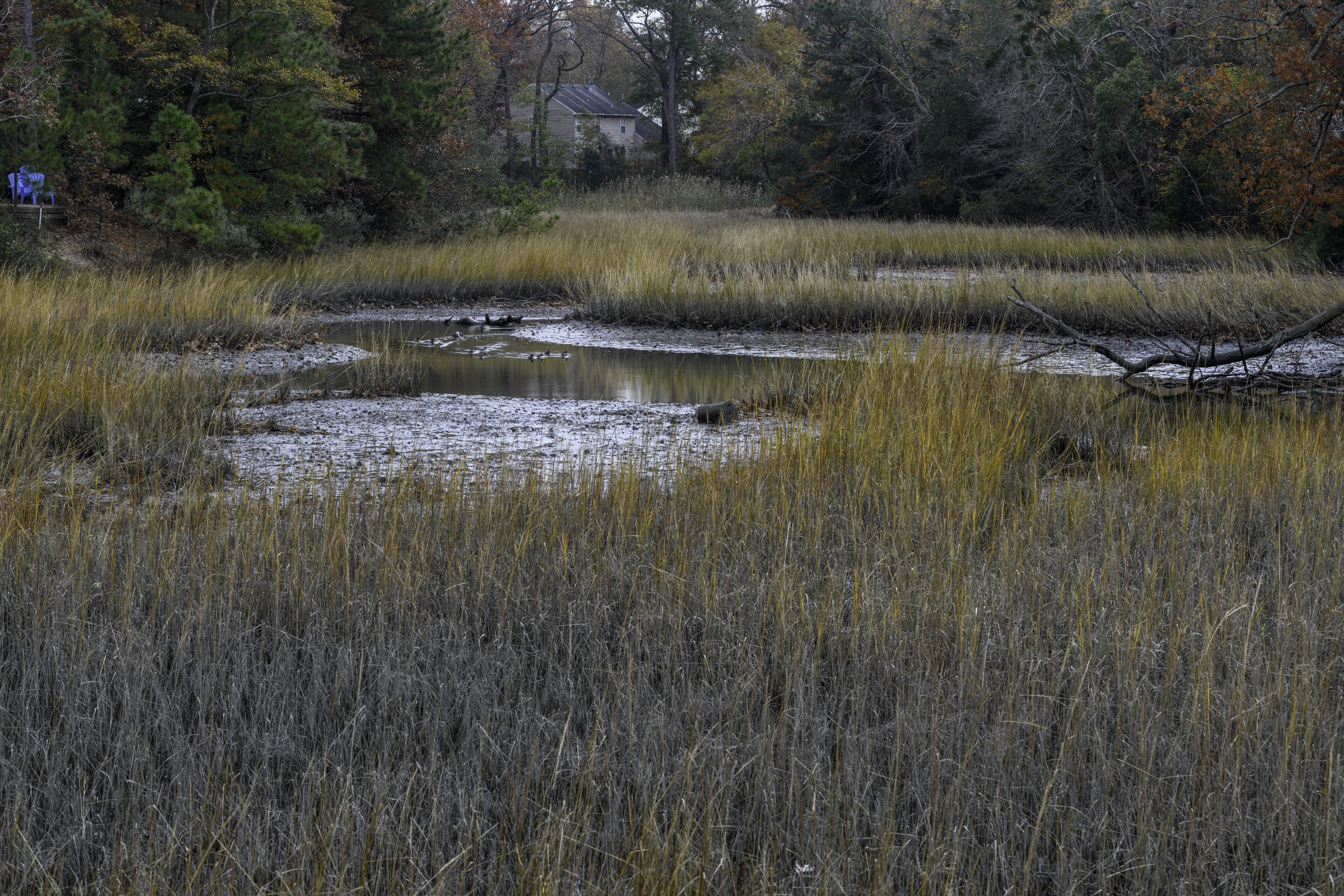
Salt Marsh at Hoffler Creek

Hoffler Creek is a 2.1-mile-long (3.4 km) tidal inlet of the James River on its southern side in Hampton Roads. It forms the boundary between the cities of Portsmouth and Suffolk, Virginia. The mouth of the creek is between the Nansemond River to the west and Craney Island to the east.

Normally a tranquil salt marsh, the estuary can change dramatically with tide, wind and rain. In 2003, Hurricane Isabel caused significant flooding into yards abutting the creek. Less dramatic flooding occurs with Nor'easter storms, which often last several days.

== Wildlife ==
Despite loss of habitat from wooded land to single-family dwellings, Hoffler Creek continues to support wildlife including:

- Otter, raccoon, gray fox, deer, opossum, groundhog, rabbit
- Bald eagle, osprey, pileated woodpecker, duck, goose, heron, egret, hawk, gull, owl, pelican
- Blue crab, turtle

== See also ==
- List of rivers in Virginia
