= Robert B. Taylor =

American politician (1774–1834)

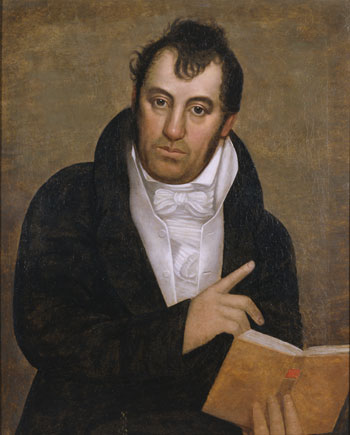
- portrait attributed to Cephas Thompson
- Born: Robert Barraud Taylor; March 24, 1774; Norfolk, Virginia, Virginia Colony
- Died: 1834 (aged 59–60); Norfolk, Virginia, U.S.
- Occupations: Soldier, Lawyer
- Title: Brigadier General, Judge

Robert Barraud Taylor (March 24, 1774 – April 13, 1834) was a nineteenth-century American lawyer and militia Brigadier General from Virginia.

== Early life ==
Taylor was born in Williamsburg, Virginia, the son of Sarah Curle Barraud, a descendant of Huguenots who had fled religious persecution in France, and Robert Taylor, who served multiple terms as mayor of Norfolk. He graduated from the College of William and Mary in 1793. While at College, he fought a duel with John Randolph of Roanoke.

== Career ==
The Virginia Capitol at Richmond VA where 19th century Conventions met

As an adult, Taylor lived in Norfolk, Virginia, and was elected to the House of Delegates from 1796 to 1800.

Appointed by the General Assembly as a Brigadier General of state militia, Taylor served in the defense of Norfolk 1813-1814 during the War of 1812; he was appointed to the same rank in the U.S. army, but declined.

In 1829, Taylor was elected to the Virginia Constitutional Convention of 1829-1830. He was chosen by the Convention to serve on the Committee on the Judicial Department, but he resigned on ascertaining that his views on enfranchisement and apportionment did not align with his constituency. He was one of four delegates elected from the western senatorial district made up his home district of the Borough of Norfolk, and Norfolk, Princess Anne, and Nansemond Counties. He was replaced by Hugh Blair Grigsby.

Taylor served on the Virginia General Court from 1831 until his death.

== Death ==
Robert B. Taylor died on April 13, 1834, in Norfolk, Virginia.

== Bibliography ==
- Pulliam, David Loyd (1901). The Constitutional Conventions of Virginia from the foundation of the Commonwealth to the present time. John T. West, Richmond. ISBN 978-1-2879-2059-5.
