= Garfield Archer =

American politician

Member of the Kansas House of Representatives
- In office 1933–1936

Personal details
- Born: June 9, 1880 Densmore, Kansas, U.S.
- Died: November 13, 1940 (aged 60) Densmore, Kansas, U.S.
- Party: Republican
- Relatives: Glenn L. Archer Jr. (grandson)

Garfield Archer (June 9, 1880 – November 13, 1940) was an American politician. He served as a Republican member of the Kansas House of Representatives.

== Life and career ==
Archer was born in Densmore, Kansas. He was a farmer.

In 1933, Archer was elected to the Kansas House of Representatives, serving until 1936.

Archer died in November 1940 of a heart attack at his home in Densmore, Kansas, at the age of 60.
