= Clifton Forge Residential Historic District =

Historic district in Virginia, United States

- U.S. National Register of Historic Places
- U.S. Historic district
- Virginia Landmarks Register
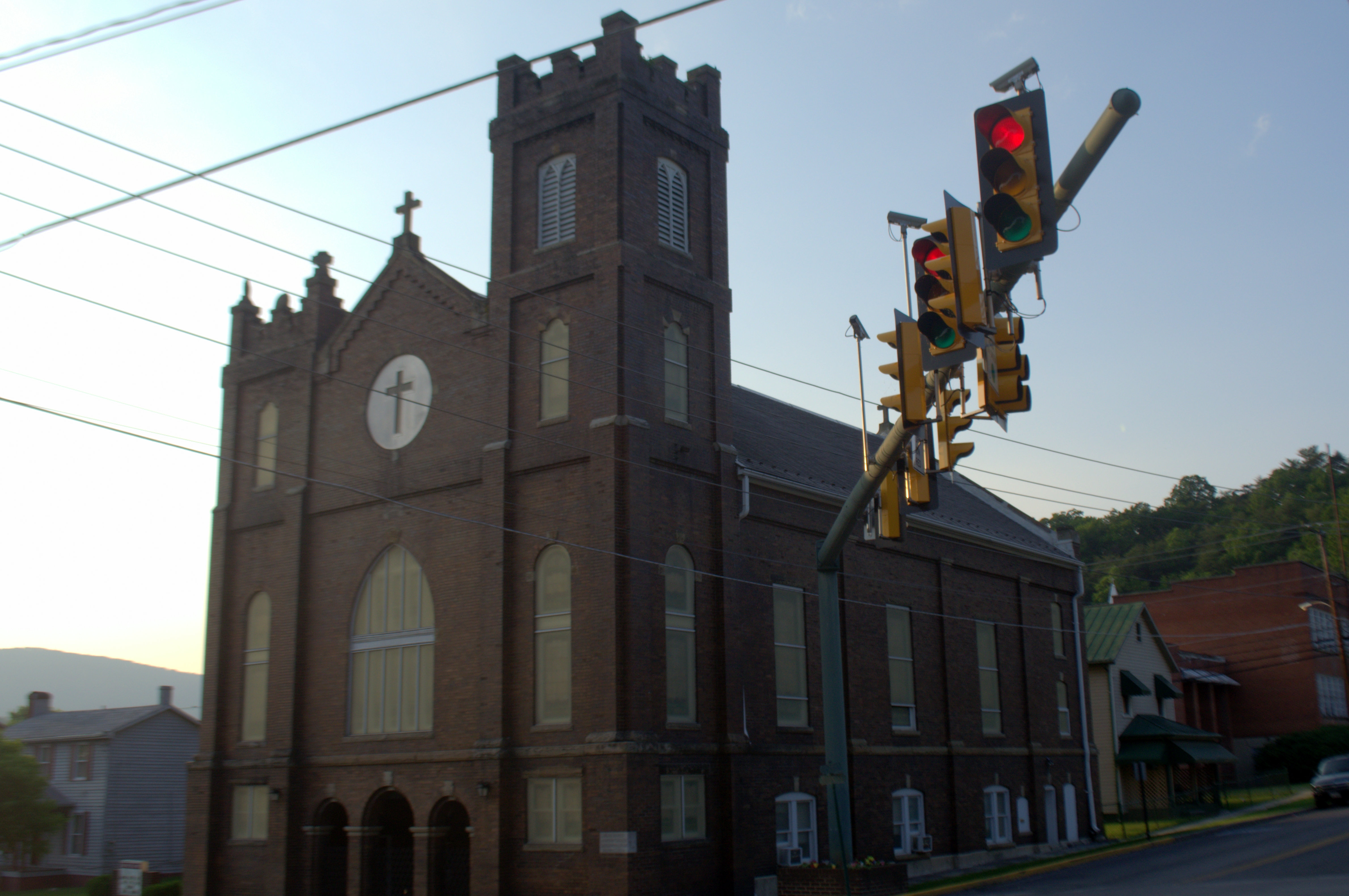
- Main Street Baptist Church

- Location within Virginia Location within the United States
- Location: Roughly bounded by Memorial Park, Crown Hill Cemetery, Dry Creek, Keswick, Lowell, Main & Pine Sts., McCormick Blvd., Clifton Forge, Virginia
- Coordinates: 37°49′06″N 79°49′32″W
- Area: 174 acres (70 ha)
- Built by: Acord, Andrew Jackson
- Architect: Frye & Chesterton; Et al.
- Architectural style: Queen Anne, Bungalow, Colonial Revival
- NRHP reference No.: 12000517
- VLR No.: 105-5036

Significant dates
- Added to NRHP: August 14, 2012
- Designated VLR: June 21, 2012

Clifton Forge Residential Historic District is a national historic district located at Clifton Forge, Alleghany County, Virginia. The district encompasses 728 contributing buildings and two contributing sites in a predominantly residential section of Clifton Forge. It primarily includes single-family frame vernacular dwellings dating to the turn-of-the 20th century. They are vernacular interpretations of a variety of popular architectural styles including Queen Anne, Colonial Revival, and Bungalow. Notable non-residential buildings include the Clifton Forge High School (1928), First Baptist Church (c. 1892), Main Street Baptist Church (1921), First Christian Church (1906), Presbyterian Church (1907), Methodist Church (1908–1910), Clifton Forge Baptist Church (1912), Clifton Forge Woman's Club (1939), and Clifton Forge Armory (1940–1941). Memorial Park and Crown Hill Cemetery are contributing sites. Located in the district and separately listed is the Jefferson School.

It was added to the National Register of Historic Places in 2012.
