= 1984 United States presidential election in Virginia =

- November 6, 1984
- Turnout: 81.5%

Nominee	Ronald Reagan	Walter Mondale
Party	Republican	Democratic
Home state	California	Minnesota
Running mate	George H. W. Bush	Geraldine Ferraro
Electoral vote	12	0
Popular vote	1,337,078	796,250
Percentage	62.29%	37.09%

Reagan
40–50%
50–60%
60–70%
70–80%
80–90%
Mondale
40–50%
50–60%
60–70%
70–80%
80–90%
90–100%
No data
President before election
Ronald Reagan
Republican
Elected President
Ronald Reagan
Republican

The 1984 United States presidential election in Virginia took place on November 6, 1984. All 50 states and the District of Columbia, were part of the 1984 United States presidential election. Virginia voters chose 12 electors to the Electoral College, which selected the president and vice president of the United States.

Virginia was won by incumbent United States President Ronald Reagan of California, who was running against former Vice President Walter Mondale of Minnesota. Reagan ran for a second time with incumbent Vice President and former C.I.A. Director George H. W. Bush of Texas, and Mondale ran with Representative Geraldine Ferraro of New York, the first major female candidate for the vice presidency.

Virginia weighed in for this election as 5 points more Republican than the national average. As of the 2024 presidential election, this is the last election in which the independent cities of Franklin, Lexington, Roanoke, and Falls Church voted for the Republican candidate, and the last election when Virginia voted to the right of Mississippi. Reagan won Virginia by a landslide 25 percentage point margin. At the time, Virginia was considered to be a Republican stronghold.

Virginia, which had been the only former Confederate state to vote for Gerald Ford in 1976, was not even particularly close in 1980. Virginia rejected the incumbent Southerner, Jimmy Carter, in favor of Reagan by nearly 13 points. Virginia would not vote Democratic until 2008, after which it has always voted Democratic.

The 1984 election confirmed Virginia's position as a center of the emerging Republican South in the late 20th century. Reagan's 62.3 percent vote share in the state made it his seventeenth best nationally, and his fourth-best in the former Confederacy, after Florida, Texas, and South Carolina. (Of those three, Florida and Texas had similarly decisively rejected Carter in 1980.)

Reagan performed well throughout all of Virginia's regions, relegating Mondale mostly to some largely African-American counties in the east, some highly unionized coal counties in southwest Virginia, and the independent cities of Alexandria, Norfolk, Richmond, and Portsmouth. Particularly noteworthy, however, was Reagan's strong performance in Virginia's large, suburban counties: he got over sixty percent of the vote in Fairfax County, which cast the most votes of any of the state's jurisdictions, and over seventy percent in the independent city of Virginia Beach, Henrico County, and Chesterfield County. He also got over 2/3 of the vote in the emerging exurb of Prince William County.

Mondale flipped Arlington County, making Reagan the first Republican since William Howard Taft in 1908 to win the White House without carrying that county. Mondale also flipped the city of Alexandria. These were among a handful of counties nationwide that flipped against Reagan. (Note: Along with Keweenaw County, Michigan, Marin County, California, Santa Cruz County, California, Tompkins County, New York, Arlington County, Virginia, Alexandria, Virginia, and Lane County, Oregon.)

== Campaign ==
Among white voters, 72% supported Reagan while 27% supported Mondale.

== Results ==
1984 United States presidential election in Virginia
Party	Candidate	Votes	Percentage	Electoral votes
Republican	Ronald Reagan (inc.)	1,337,078	62.29%	12
Democratic	Walter Mondale	796,250	37.09%	0
Independent Democrat	Lyndon LaRouche	13,307	0.62%	0
Totals		2,146,635	100.0%	12

=== By city/county ===
County or city	Ronald Reagan Republican		Walter Mondale Democratic		Lyndon LaRouche Independent Democrat		Margin		Total
County or city	#	%	#	%	#	%	#	%	Total
Accomack	8,047	64.55%	4,355	34.94%	64	0.51%	3,692	29.61%	12,466
Albemarle	14,455	64.16%	7,982	35.43%	93	0.41%	6,473	28.73%	22,530
Alexandria	21,166	46.77%	23,552	52.05%	535	1.18%	-2,386	-5.28%	45,253
Alleghany	3,067	60.89%	1,932	38.36%	38	0.75%	1,135	22.53%	5,037
Amelia	2,336	61.41%	1,432	37.64%	36	0.95%	904	23.77%	3,804
Amherst	7,004	66.51%	3,409	32.37%	117	1.11%	3,595	34.14%	10,530
Appomattox	3,386	68.65%	1,498	30.37%	48	0.97%	1,888	38.28%	4,932
Arlington	34,848	48.24%	37,031	51.26%	363	0.50%	-2,183	-3.02%	72,242
Augusta	15,308	79.22%	3,899	20.18%	116	0.60%	11,409	59.04%	19,323
Bath	1,434	65.93%	727	33.43%	14	0.64%	707	32.50%	2,175
Bedford	10,371	68.15%	4,754	31.24%	92	0.60%	5,617	36.91%	15,217
Bedford City	1,553	60.36%	997	38.75%	23	0.89%	556	21.61%	2,573
Bland	1,812	67.29%	867	32.19%	14	0.52%	945	35.10%	2,693
Botetourt	5,959	64.15%	3,243	34.91%	87	0.94%	2,716	29.24%	9,289
Bristol	5,012	67.11%	2,429	32.53%	27	0.36%	2,583	34.58%	7,468
Brunswick	2,950	48.58%	3,040	50.06%	83	1.37%	-90	-1.48%	6,073
Buchanan	5,053	38.71%	7,828	59.97%	172	1.32%	-2,775	-21.26%	13,053
Buckingham	2,627	57.36%	1,879	41.03%	74	1.62%	748	16.33%	4,580
Buena Vista	1,335	64.40%	724	34.93%	14	0.68%	611	29.47%	2,073
Campbell	13,388	74.69%	4,380	24.44%	156	0.87%	9,008	50.25%	17,924
Caroline	2,949	48.04%	3,111	50.68%	78	1.27%	-162	-2.64%	6,138
Carroll	7,056	70.26%	2,914	29.02%	72	0.72%	4,142	41.24%	10,042
Charles City	776	30.03%	1,776	68.73%	32	1.24%	-1,000	-38.70%	2,584
Charlotte	2,999	61.76%	1,811	37.29%	46	0.95%	1,188	24.47%	4,856
Charlottesville	6,947	48.56%	7,317	51.15%	42	0.29%	-370	-2.59%	14,306
Chesapeake	27,542	61.64%	16,740	37.46%	402	0.90%	10,802	24.18%	44,684
Chesterfield	54,896	79.78%	13,739	19.97%	176	0.26%	41,157	59.81%	68,811
Clarke	2,529	67.21%	1,215	32.29%	19	0.50%	1,314	34.92%	3,763
Clifton Forge	965	51.44%	896	47.76%	15	0.80%	69	3.68%	1,876
Colonial Heights	6,387	83.71%	1,218	15.96%	25	0.33%	5,169	67.75%	7,630
Covington	1,722	54.46%	1,391	43.99%	49	1.55%	331	10.47%	3,162
Craig	1,173	57.70%	845	41.56%	15	0.74%	328	16.14%	2,033
Culpeper	5,596	70.60%	2,255	28.45%	75	0.95%	3,341	42.15%	7,926
Cumberland	2,027	60.89%	1,237	37.16%	65	1.95%	790	23.73%	3,329
Danville	12,141	66.85%	5,846	32.19%	174	0.96%	6,295	34.66%	18,161
Dickenson	3,921	44.34%	4,848	54.82%	75	0.85%	-927	-10.48%	8,844
Dinwiddie	4,547	56.04%	3,485	42.95%	82	1.01%	1,062	13.09%	8,114
Emporia	1,252	60.25%	807	38.84%	19	0.91%	445	21.41%	2,078
Essex	2,120	61.63%	1,300	37.79%	20	0.58%	820	23.84%	3,440
Fairfax	183,181	62.88%	107,295	36.83%	822	0.28%	75,886	26.05%	291,298
Fairfax City	6,234	65.36%	3,263	34.21%	41	0.43%	2,971	31.15%	9,538
Falls Church	2,684	52.62%	2,398	47.01%	19	0.37%	286	5.61%	5,101
Fauquier	10,319	71.41%	4,056	28.07%	76	0.53%	6,263	43.34%	14,451
Floyd	3,431	67.69%	1,599	31.54%	39	0.77%	1,832	36.15%	5,069
Fluvanna	2,247	62.21%	1,332	36.88%	33	0.91%	915	25.33%	3,612
Franklin	7,684	60.21%	4,903	38.42%	175	1.37%	2,781	21.79%	12,762
Franklin City	1,561	49.87%	1,537	49.11%	32	1.02%	24	0.76%	3,130
Frederick	9,542	77.79%	2,671	21.77%	54	0.44%	6,871	56.02%	12,267
Fredericksburg	3,500	58.60%	2,439	40.83%	34	0.57%	1,061	17.77%	5,973
Galax	1,548	65.18%	814	34.27%	13	0.55%	734	30.91%	2,375
Giles	4,340	58.18%	3,047	40.84%	73	0.98%	1,293	17.34%	7,460
Gloucester	7,109	70.91%	2,830	28.23%	86	0.86%	4,279	42.68%	10,025
Goochland	3,404	60.60%	2,178	38.78%	35	0.62%	1,226	21.82%	5,617
Grayson	4,508	65.43%	2,319	33.66%	63	0.91%	2,189	31.77%	6,890
Greene	2,216	73.87%	760	25.33%	24	0.80%	1,456	48.54%	3,000
Greensville	2,304	48.28%	2,352	49.29%	116	2.43%	-48	-1.01%	4,772
Halifax	6,726	60.58%	4,231	38.11%	146	1.31%	2,495	22.47%	11,103
Hampton	25,537	57.95%	18,180	41.25%	351	0.80%	7,357	16.70%	44,068
Hanover	18,800	79.26%	4,831	20.37%	87	0.37%	13,969	58.89%	23,718
Harrisonburg	5,221	68.15%	2,384	31.12%	56	0.73%	2,837	37.03%	7,661
Henrico	63,864	74.74%	21,336	24.97%	248	0.29%	42,528	49.77%	85,448
Henry	12,693	63.76%	6,976	35.04%	237	1.19%	5,717	28.72%	19,906
Highland	997	70.91%	398	28.31%	11	0.78%	599	42.60%	1,406
Hopewell	5,661	68.27%	2,564	30.92%	67	0.81%	3,097	37.35%	8,292
Isle of Wight	5,664	60.18%	3,650	38.78%	98	1.04%	2,014	21.40%	9,412
James City	7,104	66.54%	3,486	32.65%	87	0.81%	3,618	33.89%	10,677
King and Queen	1,449	54.39%	1,201	45.08%	14	0.53%	248	9.31%	2,664
King George	2,356	61.34%	1,450	37.75%	35	0.91%	906	23.59%	3,841
King William	2,803	65.43%	1,448	33.80%	33	0.77%	1,355	31.63%	4,284
Lancaster	3,416	67.72%	1,559	30.91%	69	1.37%	1,857	36.81%	5,044
Lee	5,365	50.83%	5,085	48.18%	104	0.99%	280	2.65%	10,554
Lexington	1,197	55.34%	946	43.74%	20	0.92%	251	11.60%	2,163
Loudoun	17,765	67.99%	8,227	31.49%	136	0.52%	9,538	36.50%	26,128
Louisa	3,789	57.91%	2,703	41.31%	51	0.78%	1,086	16.60%	6,543
Lunenburg	2,713	59.94%	1,754	38.75%	59	1.30%	959	21.19%	4,526
Lynchburg	18,047	67.41%	8,542	31.91%	183	0.68%	9,505	35.50%	26,772
Madison	2,723	67.15%	1,302	32.11%	30	0.74%	1,421	35.04%	4,055
Manassas	4,613	71.34%	1,824	28.21%	29	0.45%	2,789	43.13%	6,466
Manassas Park	975	71.96%	375	27.68%	5	0.37%	600	44.28%	1,355
Martinsville	4,234	58.37%	2,942	40.56%	78	1.08%	1,292	17.81%	7,254
Mathews	2,868	71.61%	1,106	27.62%	31	0.77%	1,762	43.99%	4,005
Mecklenburg	6,777	65.69%	3,438	33.33%	101	0.98%	3,339	32.36%	10,316
Middlesex	2,612	67.23%	1,206	31.04%	67	1.72%	1,406	36.19%	3,885
Montgomery	12,428	62.88%	7,202	36.44%	135	0.68%	5,226	26.44%	19,765
Nelson	2,777	57.22%	2,021	41.64%	55	1.13%	756	15.58%	4,853
New Kent	2,679	68.71%	1,204	30.88%	16	0.41%	1,475	37.83%	3,899
Newport News	33,614	60.35%	21,834	39.20%	250	0.45%	11,780	21.15%	55,698
Norfolk	36,360	48.15%	38,913	51.53%	243	0.32%	-2,553	-3.38%	75,516
Northampton	2,906	55.81%	2,226	42.75%	75	1.44%	680	13.06%	5,207
Northumberland	3,166	68.41%	1,407	30.40%	55	1.19%	1,759	38.01%	4,628
Norton	806	48.32%	842	50.48%	20	1.20%	-36	-2.16%	1,668
Nottoway	3,418	59.00%	2,296	39.63%	79	1.36%	1,122	19.37%	5,793
Orange	4,483	65.72%	2,285	33.50%	53	0.78%	2,198	32.22%	6,821
Page	5,021	66.78%	2,437	32.41%	61	0.81%	2,584	34.37%	7,519
Patrick	4,703	70.47%	1,908	28.59%	63	0.94%	2,795	41.88%	6,674
Petersburg	5,753	38.17%	9,248	61.35%	73	0.48%	-3,495	-23.18%	15,074
Pittsylvania	15,743	66.08%	7,791	32.70%	290	1.22%	7,952	33.38%	23,824
Poquoson	3,667	84.73%	647	14.95%	14	0.32%	3,020	69.78%	4,328
Portsmouth	18,940	46.42%	21,623	53.00%	238	0.58%	-2,683	-6.58%	40,801
Powhatan	3,921	73.61%	1,381	25.92%	25	0.47%	2,540	47.69%	5,327
Prince Edward	3,454	56.11%	2,589	42.06%	113	1.84%	865	14.05%	6,156
Prince George	4,999	69.64%	2,136	29.76%	43	0.60%	2,863	39.88%	7,178
Prince William	34,992	68.88%	15,631	30.77%	180	0.35%	19,361	38.11%	50,803
Pulaski	8,242	64.90%	4,364	34.36%	93	0.73%	3,878	30.54%	12,699
Radford	2,855	61.15%	1,781	38.15%	33	0.71%	1,074	23.00%	4,669
Rappahannock	1,696	62.65%	999	36.90%	12	0.44%	697	25.75%	2,707
Richmond	1,869	68.46%	830	30.40%	31	1.14%	1,039	38.06%	2,730
Richmond City	38,754	43.73%	49,408	55.75%	466	0.53%	-10,654	-12.02%	88,628
Roanoke	23,348	68.56%	10,569	31.04%	137	0.40%	12,779	37.52%	34,054
Roanoke City	19,008	52.09%	17,300	47.41%	184	0.50%	1,708	4.68%	36,492
Rockbridge	4,067	65.66%	2,098	33.87%	29	0.47%	1,969	31.79%	6,194
Rockingham	13,480	75.70%	4,220	23.70%	107	0.60%	9,260	52.00%	17,807
Russell	5,738	45.54%	6,760	53.66%	101	0.80%	-1,022	-8.12%	12,599
Salem	6,419	65.43%	3,347	34.12%	44	0.45%	3,072	31.31%	9,810
Scott	5,804	59.10%	3,904	39.75%	113	1.15%	1,900	19.35%	9,821
Shenandoah	9,048	76.03%	2,771	23.29%	81	0.68%	6,277	52.74%	11,900
Smyth	8,593	67.08%	4,102	32.02%	116	0.91%	4,491	35.06%	12,811
South Boston	1,899	65.64%	974	33.67%	20	0.69%	925	31.97%	2,893
Southampton	4,669	57.99%	3,300	40.99%	82	1.02%	1,369	17.00%	8,051
Spotsylvania	8,207	66.74%	4,012	32.63%	78	0.63%	4,195	34.11%	12,297
Stafford	10,293	69.63%	4,429	29.96%	60	0.41%	5,864	39.67%	14,782
Staunton	6,137	74.88%	2,012	24.55%	47	0.57%	4,125	50.33%	8,196
Suffolk	10,128	52.97%	8,842	46.25%	149	0.78%	1,286	6.72%	19,119
Surry	1,462	43.38%	1,875	55.64%	33	0.98%	-413	-12.26%	3,370
Sussex	2,183	46.14%	2,408	50.90%	140	2.96%	-225	-4.76%	4,731
Tazewell	9,645	53.89%	8,014	44.78%	237	1.32%	1,631	9.11%	17,896
Virginia Beach	72,571	74.36%	24,703	25.31%	320	0.33%	47,868	49.05%	97,594
Warren	5,016	65.73%	2,551	33.43%	64	0.84%	2,465	32.30%	7,631
Washington	12,132	68.06%	5,573	31.26%	121	0.68%	6,559	36.80%	17,826
Waynesboro	4,465	73.45%	1,579	25.97%	35	0.58%	2,886	47.48%	6,079
Westmoreland	3,219	56.84%	2,363	41.73%	81	1.43%	856	15.11%	5,663
Williamsburg	1,913	56.23%	1,469	43.18%	20	0.59%	444	13.05%	3,402
Winchester	5,055	70.68%	2,064	28.86%	33	0.46%	2,991	41.82%	7,152
Wise	7,909	51.36%	7,303	47.43%	187	1.21%	606	3.93%	15,399
Wythe	6,773	68.65%	2,996	30.37%	97	0.98%	3,777	38.28%	9,866
York	10,214	71.24%	4,063	28.34%	60	0.42%	6,151	42.90%	14,337
Totals	1,337,078	62.29%	796,250	37.09%	13,307	0.62%	540,828	25.20%	2,146,635

==== Counties and independent cities that flipped from Republican to Democratic ====
- Arlington
- Alexandria

==== Counties and independent cities that flipped from Democratic to Republican ====
- Alleghany
- Bath
- Buckingham
- Craig
- Dinwiddie
- Franklin
- Giles
- Henry
- Isle of Wight
- King and Queen
- Lee
- Louisa
- Nelson
- Northampton
- Pulaski
- Southampton
- Wise
- Bedford
- Buena Vista
- Clifton Forge
- Covington
- Franklin
- Hampton
- Lexington
- Radford
- Roanoke
- Suffolk

=== Results by congressional district ===
All ten congressional districts, including four that elected Democrats, voted for Reagan.

District	Reagan	Mondale	Representative
1st	62%	37%	Herb Bateman
2nd	63%	37%	George Whitehurst
3rd	65%	35%	Tom Bliley
4th	56%	43%	Norman Sisisky
5th	66%	34%	Dan Daniel
6th	66%	34%	Jim Olin
7th	69%	31%	James Robinson
7th	69%	31%	Daniel Slaughter
8th	61%	38%	Stanford Parris
9th	58%	41%	Rick Boucher
10th	59%	41%	Frank Wolf

== See also ==
- Presidency of Ronald Reagan

== Works cited ==
- Black, Earl; Black, Merle (1992). The Vital South: How Presidents Are Elected. Harvard University Press. ISBN 0674941306.
