= William Overstreet =

William Overstreet may refer to:

- William Overstreet Jr., American fighter pilot
- William Benton Overstreet, American songwriter, bandleader and pianist
- Bill Overstreet, mayor of Juneau, Alaska
- Will Overstreet, American football linebacker
