= West Clifton Forge, Virginia =

Incorporated town in Alleghany County, Virginia

Coordinates: 37.811583°N 79.837580°W

West Clifton Forge was an incorporated town located in Alleghany County, Virginia, United States. In 1906 the towns of Clifton Forge and West Clifton Forge merged to form the independent city of Clifton Forge.
