= Harvey Woods =

American baseball coach and athletic director (1921–1996)

Biographical details
- Born: March 21, 1921; Clifton Forge, Virginia, U.S.
- Died: February 25, 1996 (aged 74)

Coaching career (HC unless noted)
- 1951–1966: Fairleigh Dickinson
- 1978–1979: Fairleigh Dickinson

Administrative career (AD unless noted)
- 1950–1966: Fairleigh Dickinson

Head coaching record
- Overall: 225–167–2

Harvey Drewry Woods Jr. (March 21, 1921 – February 25, 1996) was an American coach and administrator who was the first athletic director at Fairleigh Dickinson University and was the school's baseball coach from 1951 to 1966 and 1978 to 1979.

== Early life ==
Woods was born in Clifton Forge, Virginia. He attended Hampden–Sydney College and was a member of the school's football and baseball teams. He served in the United States Army Air Corps during World War II and was a member of the Eighth Air Force's baseball team. After leaving the military, Woods attended the University of Richmond, where he played baseball and football.

== Fairleigh Dickinson University ==
Woods was the first athletic director at Fairleigh Dickinson University. From 1951 to 1966, he was also the school's baseball coach. From 1961 to 1962, he was chairman of the Eastern College Athletic Conference eligibility committee. He resigned as athletic director in 1977 to return to coaching. He coached two more seasons, retiring in 1979. In eighteen seasons, Woods had an overall record of 225–167–2.

== Later life ==
Woods moved to Melbourne, Florida in 1983. He died on February 25, 1996.
