= Glenn L. Archer Jr. =

American judge (1929–2011)

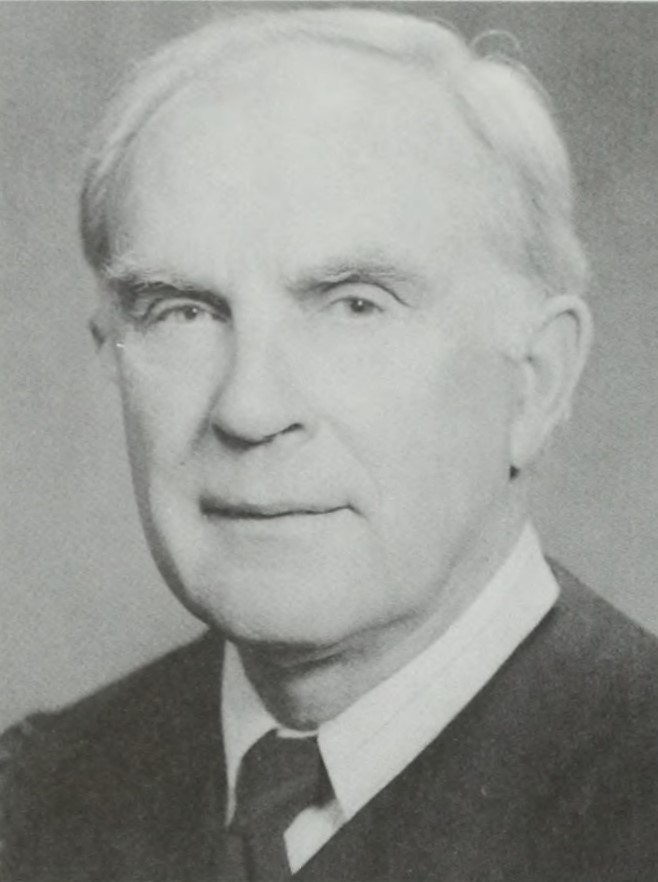

Senior Judge of the United States Court of Appeals for the Federal Circuit
- In office December 24, 1997 – July 27, 2011

Chief Judge of the United States Court of Appeals for the Federal Circuit
- In office March 18, 1994 – December 24, 1997
- Preceded by: Helen W. Nies
- Succeeded by: Haldane Robert Mayer

Judge of the United States Court of Appeals for the Federal Circuit
- In office December 17, 1985 – December 24, 1997
- Appointed by: Ronald Reagan
- Preceded by: Jack Miller
- Succeeded by: Timothy B. Dyk

Personal details
- Born: Glenn Leroy Archer Jr. March 21, 1929 Densmore, Kansas, U.S.
- Died: July 27, 2011 (aged 82) Tempe, Arizona, U.S.
- Relations: Garfield Archer (grandfather)
- Education: Yale University (BA); George Washington University (JD)

Glenn Leroy Archer Jr. (March 21, 1929 – July 27, 2011) was a United States circuit judge of the United States Court of Appeals for the Federal Circuit.

== Education and career ==
Born in Densmore, Kansas, Archer moved to Topeka, Kansas, where he attended public high school. Archer received a Bachelor of Arts degree in English literature from Yale University in 1952 and a Juris Doctor, with honors, from George Washington University Law School in 1954. He served as a First Lieutenant in the Judge Advocate General's Office of the United States Air Force from 1954 to 1956. He entered private practice in Washington, D.C., as an associate in the law firm of Hamel, Park, McCabe and Saunders from 1956 to 1960 and a partner from 1960 to 1981. Archer served as Assistant Attorney General in charge of the United States Department of Justice Tax Division from 1982 to 1984.

== Federal judicial service ==
On October 16, 1985, Archer was nominated by President Ronald Reagan to a seat on the United States Court of Appeals for the Federal Circuit vacated by Judge Jack Miller. Archer was confirmed by the United States Senate on December 16, 1985, and received his commission on December 17, 1985. He assumed duties as a Circuit Judge on December 23, 1985. He replaced Judge Helen W. Nies as Chief Judge on March 18, 1994, and served in that capacity until December 24, 1997, when (now former) Chief Judge Haldane Robert Mayer replaced him. Archer assumed senior status on December 24, 1997. He died on July 27, 2011.

== Personal life ==
Archer resided in Alexandria, Virginia, and Oxford, Maryland, but subsequently moved to Tempe, Arizona.

He enjoyed boating and the outdoors, building his own kayak. He was married twice with four children and one step child.

== Sources ==
Legal offices
Preceded by Jack Miller	Judge of the United States Court of Appeals for the Federal Circuit; 1985–1997	Succeeded by Timothy B. Dyk
Preceded by Helen W. Nies	Chief Judge of the United States Court of Appeals for the Federal Circuit; 1994–1997	Succeeded by Haldane Robert Mayer
