= Richard Hertling =

American judge (born 1960)

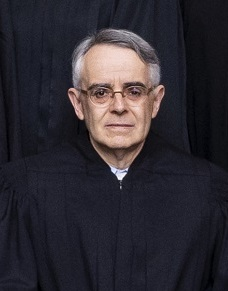
- Hertling in 2022

Judge of the United States Court of Federal Claims
- Incumbent
- Assumed office June 12, 2019
- Appointed by: Donald Trump
- Preceded by: George Miller

United States Assistant Attorney General for the Office of Legislative Affairs
- Acting
- In office 2003–2007
- President: George W. Bush
- Preceded by: Daniel J. Bryant
- Succeeded by: Ronald Weich

Personal details
- Born: Richard Alan Hertling; January 25, 1960 (age 65) New York City, New York, U.S.
- Political party: Republican
- Education: Brown University (BA); University of Chicago (JD)

Richard Alan Hertling (born January 25, 1960) is a judge of the United States Court of Federal Claims.

== Education and career ==
Hertling earned his Bachelor of Arts, magna cum laude, from Brown University, and his J.D. degree from the University of Chicago Law School.

After graduating from law school, Hertling served as a law clerk to Judge Henry Anthony Politz of the United States Court of Appeals for the Fifth Circuit.

During the George W. Bush administration, Hertling worked at the United States Department of Justice, where he served as Acting United States Assistant Attorney General for the Office of Legislative Affairs.

Before joining the Bush administration, Hertling served as the Republican Staff Director of the United States Senate Committee on Governmental Affairs. Earlier, he served as Chief Counsel of the United States Senate Committee on the Judiciary's Subcommittee on Terrorism, Technology & the Law. He also served as chief of staff to United States Senator Peter Fitzgerald and as chief counsel of the United States House Committee on the Judiciary. Hertling advised Fred Thompson's 2008 presidential campaign. He also served as a staffer for Senators Lamar Alexander and Arlen Specter. From 2013 to 2019 he was part of the public affairs practice of Covington & Burling.

=== Claims court service ===
On April 26, 2018, President Donald Trump announced his intent to nominate Hertling to serve as a Judge of the United States Court of Federal Claims for a term of 15 years. On May 7, 2018, his nomination was sent to the United States Senate. He was nominated to the seat vacated by Judge George W. Miller, who retired on August 7, 2013. On October 24, 2018, a hearing on his nomination was held before the Senate Judiciary Committee. On January 3, 2019, his nomination was returned to the President under Rule XXXI, Paragraph 6 of the Senate. On January 23, 2019, President Trump announced his intent to renominate Hertling for a federal judgeship. His nomination was sent to the Senate later that day. On February 7, 2019, his nomination was reported out of committee by a 19–3 vote.

On June 5, 2019, the Senate invoked cloture on his nomination by a 66–23 vote. On June 10, 2019, Hertling was confirmed by a 69–27 vote. He received his judicial commission on June 12, 2019.

Legal offices
Preceded by George Miller	Judge of the United States Court of Federal Claims; 2019–present	Incumbent
