= Sally Katzen =

American lawyer

- Born: November 22, 1942 (age 83)
- Education: Smith College (BA); University of Michigan (JD)
- Political party: Democratic
- Spouse: Timothy B. Dyk
- Children: 1

Sally Katzen (born November 22, 1942) is an American lawyer, legal scholar, and government official. Katzen was a member of the Obama-Biden Transition Project's Agency Review Working Group responsible for the Executive Office of the President and government operations agencies, and held White House positions in the Clinton administration, including as administrator of the Office of Information and Regulatory Affairs.

Katzen worked at the Podesta Group as senior advisor and teaches at the New York University School of Law.

== Government ==
During the Clinton administration, Katzen served as deputy director for management in the Office of Management and Budget from 1999 through 2001, as deputy assistant to the President for economic policy and deputy director of the National Economic Council during 1998 and 1999, and as administrator of the Office of Information and Regulatory Affairs in the Office of Management and Budget from 1993 through 1998. Katzen also served in the Carter Administration as general counsel and then as deputy director for program policy of the Council on Wage and Price Stability in the Executive Office of the President.

Katzen has served on National Academies of Science panels and is a Fellow of the National Academy of Public Administration.

== Biography ==
Katzen was born and raised in Pittsburgh, Pennsylvania, where she graduated from Taylor Allderdice High School, and graduated magna cum laude from Smith College and the University of Michigan Law School, where she was editor-in-chief of the Michigan Law Review. She was the first female to hold such a position for a major law review. After graduating from law school, she clerked for Judge J. Skelly Wright of the U.S. Court of Appeals for the District of Columbia Circuit.

In the 1980s she was a partner in the Washington, D.C. law firm Wilmer Cutler & Pickering, specializing in regulatory and legislative matters. She has worked extensively in the field of administrative law in her personal law practice and in other professional activities. In 1988, she was elected chair of the Section on Administrative Law and Regulatory Practice of the American Bar Association; she has held various other offices in the ABA, including serving two terms as a Washington delegate to the House of Delegates. She served as a public member and vice-chairman of the adjunct professor at Georgetown Law Center. In 1990 she was elected president of the Women's Legal Defense Fund. She joined the Clinton administration in 1993. She worked at the Podesta Group as senior advisor.

Katzen has taught at Smith College, George Mason University School of Law, the University of Michigan Law School, the University of Pennsylvania Law School, Johns Hopkins University, and the George Washington University Law School. Since spring 2011 she has been a visiting professor at the NYU School of Law.

== Personal life ==
Sally Katzen is married to U.S. Court of Appeals for the Federal Circuit judge Timothy B. Dyk, and they have one child, Abraham Benjamin Dyk. Katzen is Jewish, and she taught at the Temple Sinai in Pittsburgh where her parents Nathan and Hilda Katzen were founding members of the congregation.
