= Clifton Furnace =

- U.S. National Register of Historic Places
- Virginia Landmarks Register
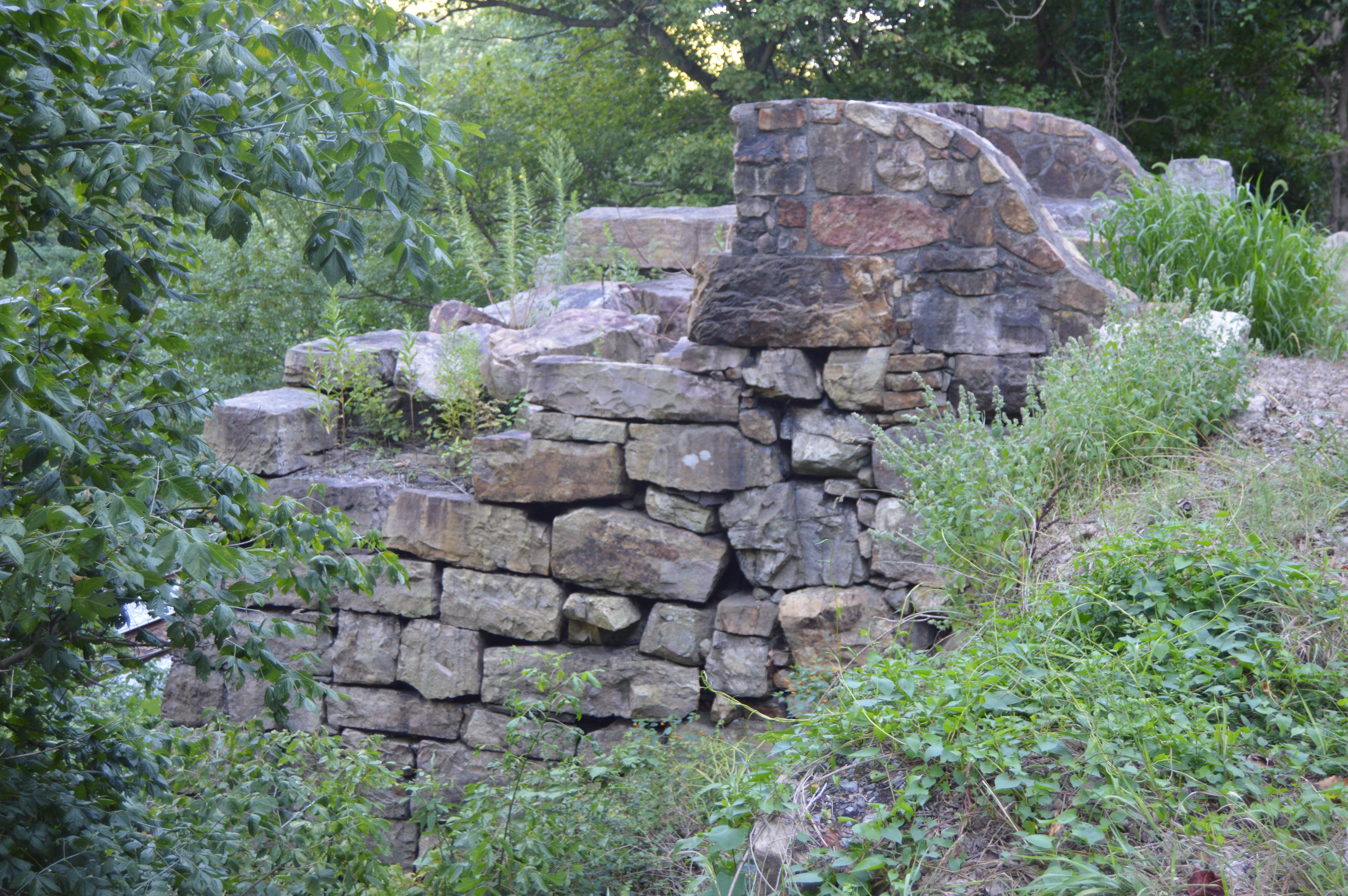
- Northern side

- Location within Virginia Location within the United States
- Location: U.S. Route 220, near Clifton Forge, Virginia
- Coordinates: 37°48′34″N 79°47′50″W
- Area: less than one acre
- Built: 1846
- Architectural style: Cold Blast Charcoal Furnace
- NRHP reference No.: 77001485
- VLR No.: 003-0019

Significant dates
- Added to NRHP: August 16, 1977
- Designated VLR: February 17, 1977

Clifton Furnace is a historic cold blast charcoal furnace located near Clifton Forge, Alleghany County, Virginia. It was built in 1846 of large, rough-hewn, rectangular stones. It measures 34 feet square at the base and the sides and face taper towards the top. The furnace went out of blast in 1854 and was revamped in 1874. It was abandoned in 1877.

It was added to the National Register of Historic Places in 1982.
