= Timothy B. Dyk =

American federal judge (born 1937)

Timothy Dyk
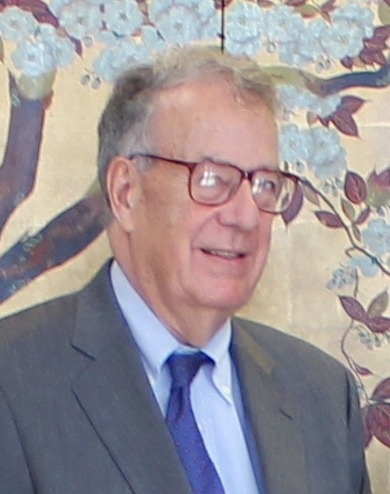
- Dyk in 2013

Judge of the United States Court of Appeals for the Federal Circuit
- Incumbent
- Assumed office May 25, 2000
- Appointed by: Bill Clinton
- Preceded by: Glenn L. Archer Jr.

Personal details
- Born: Timothy Belcher Dyk; February 14, 1937 (age 89) Boston, Massachusetts, U.S.
- Spouse: Sally Katzen
- Relatives: Ruth Dyk (mother)
- Education: Harvard University (BA, JD)

Timothy Belcher Dyk (born February 14, 1937) is an American lawyer and jurist serving since 2000 as a U.S. circuit judge of the U.S. Court of Appeals for the Federal Circuit.

== Education and early career ==
Dyk was born on February 14, 1937, in Boston. His mother was the women's suffragist and psychologist Ruth Dyk. His father, Walter Dyk, studied and wrote about the Navajo Indians. He graduated from Harvard College in 1958 with a Bachelor of Arts, cum laude, and from Harvard Law School in 1961 with Juris Doctor, magna cum laude, where he was a member of the Harvard Law Review.

Dyk clerked for retired United States Supreme Court Justices Stanley Forman Reed and Harold Hitz Burton in 1961 and 1962, and clerked for Supreme Court Chief Justice Earl Warren from 1962 to 1963. While clerking for Chief Justice Warren, Dyk came across a handwritten pro se petition for a writ of certiorari from a prisoner in Florida named Clarence Earl Gideon asserting that the trial court had improperly denied his constitutional right to a lawyer. Chief Justice Warren had specifically instructed Dyk to look out for a case raising the right-to-counsel issue. The Supreme Court heard the case, and in March 1963 issued its landmark opinion in Gideon v. Wainwright, which established that the U.S. Constitution provides indigent defendants with the right to have the assistance of a lawyer.

From 1963 until 1964, Dyk completed a one-year assignment with the United States Department of Justice as Special Assistant to the then Assistant Attorney General, Tax Division, Louis F. Oberdorfer.

== Private practice ==
Dyk worked in private practice as an attorney in Washington, D.C., from 1964 until 2000, first with Wilmer, Cutler & Pickering, where he became a partner, and later with Jones, Day, Reavis & Pogue, where he was chair of the Issues and Appeals practice. He was a lecturer at the Georgetown University Law Center in 1983, 1986, and 1989, a visiting professor and lecturer at the University of Virginia School of Law from 1984 to 1985 and from 1987 to 1988, and was also a lecturer at Yale Law School in 1986, 1987, and 1989.

Immediately prior to being nominated to the Federal Circuit in 1998, Dyk was a partner at Jones Day, specializing in First Amendment law. One case saw Dyk arguing for the release to the public of the cockpit recordings of the Space Shuttle Challenger disaster. In an August 4, 1997, article in The Washington Post, Dyk was identified as one of "only a handful of repeat performers considered heavyweights" in representing clients before the United States Supreme Court. Dyk also made the news in the early and mid-1990s for his desire to open federal courtrooms to news media organizations. After the Judicial Conference of the United States voted on September 20, 1994, to keep cameras out of federal courtrooms by ending a pilot program that had allowed cameras at civil trials and appeals in eight courts, Dyk told the Washington Post that "they appear to have slammed the door on a very important experiment, which, if it had been expanded, would have benefited people throughout the country."

== Federal judicial service ==
On April 6, 1998, President Bill Clinton nominated Dyk to a seat on the United States Court of Appeals for the Federal Circuit vacated by Judge Glenn L. Archer Jr. With the United States Senate controlled by Republicans, Dyk's nomination languished for more than two years. The delay was due in part to some Republican Senators' views that the Federal Circuit did not need another judge. Dyk was confirmed by the Senate by a 74–25 vote on May 24, 2000. He received his commission on May 25, 2000. As of 2016, Dyk has written over 400 precedential majority decisions and over 170 non-precedential majority decisions for the Federal Circuit, and over 50 precedential majority decisions for the First Circuit, where he has sat by designation. Dyk has also sat by designation as a trial judge in the Eastern District of Texas and the District of Delaware.

== Personal life ==
Dyk's wife, Sally Katzen, was the Administrator of the Office of Information and Regulatory Affairs and the Deputy Director for Management, Office of Management and Budget during the Clinton administration, and is currently a Professor of Practice and Distinguished Scholar in Residence as well as the Co-Director of the Legislative and Regulatory Process Clinic at New York University School of Law.

== See also ==
- List of law clerks for the chief justice of the United States
- List of law clerks for the sixth seat of the Supreme Court of the United States
- List of law clerks for the eighth seat of the Supreme Court of the United States

Legal offices
Preceded by Glenn L. Archer Jr.	Judge of the United States Court of Appeals for the Federal Circuit; 2000–present	Incumbent
