= Ruth Dyk =

American psychologist, suffragist, and author

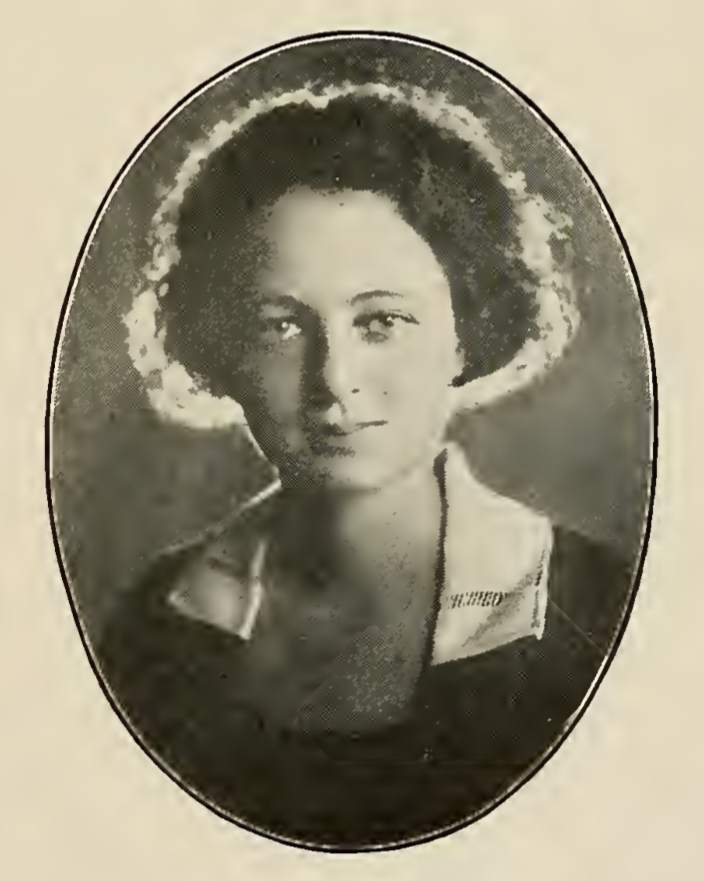
- Ruth Belcher, from the 1923 yearbook of Wellesley College
- Born: Ruth Belcher; March 25, 1901; Portland, Maine, U.S.
- Died: November 18, 2000 (aged 99); Rochester, New York, U.S.
- Education: Wellesley College; Simmons College; University of Wisconsin; University of California, Berkeley
- Occupations: Suffragist, psychologist, author

Ruth Dyk (née Belcher; March 25, 1901 – November 18, 2000) was an American suffragist, psychologist, and author. As a young woman, she and her mother marched together in Boston for women's suffrage, and late in life she was featured in Ken Burns' documentary on the subject, Not for Ourselves Alone. Dyk also worked as a researcher at the State University of New York, publishing findings that challenged contemporary notions that motherhood necessarily brought women happiness.

== Early life and education ==
Dyk was born Ruth Belcher on March 25, 1901, in Portland, Maine. Her parents were Arthur Fuller Belcher, a lawyer who died when Ruth was three, and Annie Manson Belcher, who was one of the first women to attend Tufts Medical School, though the school forced her out when she married. Ruth grew up in Newton Center, Massachusetts, where Ruth and her mother marched together in Boston for women's suffrage.

Dyk attended Wellesley College as an undergraduate, graduating in 1923, and Simmons College, earning an M.A. in economics. She also studied at the University of Wisconsin and the University of California, Berkeley.

Dyk was later featured in Ken Burns' documentary of suffragists, Not for Ourselves Alone.

== Career ==
Dyk worked with delinquent girls as a psychiatric social worker in upstate New York. She later became a researcher at the Downstate Medical Center of the State University of New York in Brooklyn. In 1950, she co-wrote Anxiety in Pregnancy and Childbirth (published by Paul B. Hoeber, an imprint of Harper & Bros.), reporting research findings that, contrary to the prevailing view that bearing children necessarily brought women happiness, pregnancy could exacerbate the difficulties of women who had mental illnesses or were “maladjusted”.

Dyk also co-wrote Psychological Differentiation (Wiley, 1962), and Left Handed (Columbia University Press, 1980), an anthropological study of Navajo Indians continuing work begun by her husband.

Dyk appeared in Not For Ourselves Alone: The Story of Elizabeth Cady Stanton & Susan B. Anthony in the show's first episode. Dyk, 98, discusses a march for women's suffrage she witnessed as a teenager.

== Personal life and death ==
She married Walter Dyk, an anthropologist, who died in 1972. They had two children: Timothy Dyk, a judge, and Penelope Carter.

Dyk died on November 18, 2000, in her home in Rochester, New York. She was 99.
