= Jimmie V. Reyna =

American judge (born 1952)

Jimmie Reyna
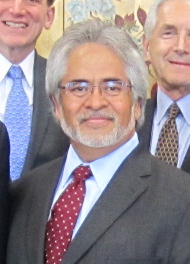
- Reyna in 2011

Judge of the United States Court of Appeals for the Federal Circuit
- Incumbent
- Assumed office April 5, 2011
- Appointed by: Barack Obama
- Preceded by: Haldane Robert Mayer

Personal details
- Born: November 11, 1952 (age 74) Tucumcari, New Mexico, U.S.
- Education: University of Rochester (BA); University of New Mexico (JD)

Jimmie V. Reyna (born November 11, 1952) is an American lawyer, former president of the Hispanic National Bar Association, and a United States circuit judge of the United States Court of Appeals for the Federal Circuit.

Reyna's appointment to the federal bench had two historical distinctions: he became both the first Latino and first international trade practitioner to be appointed to the Federal Circuit.

== Early life and education ==
Jimmie Reyna was born on November 11, 1952, in Tucumcari, New Mexico, to Julian Calano Reyna and Consuelo Valdenebro Reyna, who were Baptist missionaries. He grew up in Clovis, New Mexico, and graduated as valedictorian of his high school class. He was also senior class president, a letterman, and participated in the speech and drama clubs. Throughout high school, Reyna held after-school jobs and worked at night with his father, cleaning offices.

Reyna received his Bachelor of Arts degree from the University of Rochester in 1975 and his Juris Doctor from the University of New Mexico School of Law in 1978.

In 1971, Reyna entered the University of Rochester on scholarship where he majored in history. During his freshman year, Reyna married classmate Dolores Ramirez from the Bronx, New York; they had their first child during their sophomore year. While in college, during their summers, he sold books door-to-door in various cities and regions around the country. As a WRUR campus disc jockey, he created Rochester's first Spanish language radio program, which he operated as a community program for several hours each Saturday morning. Both Dolores and Reyna graduated from the University of Rochester in 1975.

In 1975, Reyna entered the University of New Mexico School of Law. During his third year of law school, he participated in the Centro Legal Clinical Law Program and the Felony Prosecution Program and clerked for Ortega & Snead. He received his Juris Doctor in 1978 and was admitted to the New Mexico State Bar in 1979.

== Professional career ==
Reyna's legal career has included work as a solo practitioner, firm associate, law firm partner, and the federal bench. His practice has involved jury and bench trials, representation of companies, individuals and children, and appearances before municipal, state, and federal courts as well as a wide variety of U.S. administrative and agencies and governmental departments. His bar admissions include the Supreme Court of the United States, the U.S. Court of Appeals for the Federal Circuit, the U.S. Court of International Trade, the U.S. Court of Appeals for the Tenth Circuit, the U.S. District Court for the District of New Mexico, the District of Columbia Court of Appeals, and the Supreme Court of the State of New Mexico.

After completing law school, Reyna stayed in New Mexico to work as an associate for the law firm of Shaffer, Butt, Thornton & Baer. From 1981 to 1986, Reyna had a solo practice in Albuquerque, New Mexico. In 1984, he was a founder of the Hispanic Culture Foundation and for the next several years served on its board and as its legal counsel. The Hispanic Culture Foundation was the predecessor organization to the National Hispanic Cultural Center (and Foundation) located in Albuquerque, New Mexico. In 1985, he attended the National Security Forum of the Air War College in Montgomery, Alabama. Throughout their time in Albuquerque, both Reyna and Dolores were actively engaged in the area's mental health community.

In 1986, Reyna started as an associate in Washington, D.C., with the law firm of Stewart & Stewart, where he specialized in trade policy and international trade regulation. In 1993, he was made partner at Stewart and Stewart. By then his work had expanded to international trade policy as he developed expertise and an international reputation in matters involving multilateral and regional trade arrangements, including representation of client interests in international trade negotiations.

Since 1994, Reyna has served as a U.S. panelist for disputes arising under Chapter 19 of the North American Free Trade Agreement (NAFTA), addressing antidumping claims and countervailing duties. In addition, in 1995, he was nominated by the U.S. government and confirmed by the World Trade Organization (WTO) to serve on the U.S. roster of non- governmental panelists for the World Trade Organization (WTO), Dispute Settlement Mechanism for disputes involving both trade in goods and trade in services, one of a few individuals worldwide who at that time received that distinction. He served on both the NAFTA and the WTO rosters up to his appointment to the federal bench.

In 1998, Reyna joined Williams Mullen as a partner, and directed the firm's Trade and Customs Practice Group and its Latin America Task Force. In 2006, he was elected to serve on the firm's board of directors for a two-year term, and then reelected in 2008 to a three-year term.

Judge Reyna has authored two books, Passport to North American Trade: Rules of Origin and Customs Procedures Under the NAFTA (Shepards 1995), and The GATT Uruguay Round, A Negotiating History: Services, 1986-1992 (Kluwer 1993). He has also authored a number of articles on international trade and customs issues.

For over 25 years, Reyna worked as an international trade practitioner. His legal work has focused on laws, regulations, and governmental measures that affect cross-border movement of goods and services. He advised clients on foreign investment; U.S. and foreign trade policy; international treaties, pacts, and accords; trade negotiations; international trade agreements; and multilateral trade-related organizations. He provided representation on U.S. trade relief cases (antidumping, countervailing duty, and safeguard actions), including trade cases involving U.S. interests that are brought before foreign governments. In addition, he provided extensive representation in business regulation matters including compliance, export controls, FCPA, customs, trade in services, rules of origin, customs audits/compliance, product standards, food safety, and homeland and border security issues. He represented clients before the Court of International Trade, the U.S. Court of Appeals for the Federal Circuit, and assisted with the representation of U.S. clients before foreign governmental, administrative and judicial bodies. On three separate occasions, the Court of International Trade commended him for his pro bono work before that court.

== Federal judicial service ==
Reyna was originally nominated to fill a seat on the United States Court of Appeals for the Federal Circuit on September 29, 2010. His nomination was returned to the President after the adjournment of Congress and he was renominated on January 5, 2011. The Senate confirmed his nomination on April 4, 2011, by a 86–0 vote. He received his commission on April 5, 2011. Reyna's appointment to the federal bench had two historical distinctions: he became both the first Latino and first international trade practitioner to be appointed to the Federal Circuit.

As of January 11, 2019, Reyna has heard 1,325 cases and authored 272 opinions, including 125 precedential opinions and 3 en banc opinions; Reyna authored the en banc opinions in Wi-Fi One, LLC v. Broadcom Corporation, 878 F.3d 1364 (Fed. Cir. 2018) (en banc), Suprema, Inc. v. Int'l Trade Comm'n, 796 F.3d 1338 (Fed. Cir. 2015) (en banc) and Cloer v. Sec'y of Health & Human Servs., 675 F.3d 1358 (Fed. Cir. 2012) (en banc order). In 2018, Judge Reyna authored the most precedential opinions by the Federal Circuit at fifteen opinions.

Notable cases authored by Judge Reyna include Monk v. Shulkin, 855 F.3d 1312 (Fed. Cir. 2017) and his dissent in Kingdomware Technologies, Inc. v. United States, 754 F.3d 923 (Fed. Cir. 2014). In Monk, the Federal Circuit ruled for the first time that veterans may bring class actions against the Department of Veterans Affairs. In Kingdomware Technologies, Inc. v. United States, 136 S. Ct. 1969 (2016), the Supreme Court adopted Judge Reyna's dissenting position that 38 U.S.C. § 8127(a) of the Veterans Benefits, Health Care and Information Technology Act of 2006 requires the Department of Veterans Affairs to apply the "Rule of Two" in all contracting decisions. Until the Supreme Court's decision, the department applied the Rule of Two only when it needed contracts to satisfy its annual goals for contracting with service-disabled and other veteran-owned small businesses.

== Awards ==
Judge Reyna has been nationally recognized as a leader and jurist. In 2009, Judge Reyna received the Ohtli Award, the highest honor bestowed by the Mexican government on non-Mexican citizens for work in the U.S. (and other countries) assisting Mexican citizens and promoting Mexican culture. He has consistently been named to Top 100 lists as one of the most influential Latino leaders by Hispanic Business Magazine (2011), Latino Leaders Magazine (2011, 2012, 2015, 2016 and 2017), and Washington Business Journal (2010). In 2018, Judge Reyna received the Hon. William C. Conner Inn Excellence Award. This award is given to judges of certain federal courts for their "dedication to the promotion of excellence in the legal profession."

In 2017, Judge Reyna delivered the commencement speech at the University of Rochester. The University of Rochester also awarded Reyna the Charles Force Hutchison and Marjorie Smith Hutchison Medal in 2017 for outstanding achievement and notable service. Reyna also delivered the 2017 commencement address to graduates of the South Texas College of Law Houston, where he was introduced as "One of the most influential Hispanic lawyers - and people - in our country."

Judge Reyna is heavily involved in the Hispanic National Bar Association where he has provided nearly twenty years of leadership, including serving as its National President from 2006 to 2007. He also help found the U.S.-Mexico Law Institute, where he has served as a member of its board of directors.

== Personal ==
Reyna married his wife, Dolores Ramirez, during his freshman year at the University of Rochester. They left New Mexico for Rockville, Maryland in 1986 in search of specialized care facilities for their autistic son. In 1989, he was ordained as a Deacon, First Baptist Church of Wheaton, Maryland, where for over ten years he taught a Sunday School Class for senior men (ages 60 and over).

Reyna's professional career reflects his belief that an attorney owes a duty to improve the profession and to be of service to the community. He first joined the American Bar Association and the Hispanic National Bar Association in 1981.

Reyna's work in the American Bar Association included: Section on International Law (vice-chair Mexican Law Committee, 1990–92; co-chair of the Mexican Law Committee 1993–94, 2003–05; chair of the U.S.-Mexico Foreign Trade Subcommittee, 1989–90, 1994; Section on Dispute Resolution, International Committee (co-chair of the Subcommittee on MERCOSUR 1999–01, co-chair Subcommittee on WTO 2001–06)).

Reyna's work for the Hispanic National Bar Association (HNBA) began in earnest in 1998. In 1999 he started the HNBA International Law Committee and served as its chair for several years. In 2004, he was elected to the HNBA Board of Governors as a Regional President for Region V (MD, DC, VA, WVA). In 2005 he was elected HNBA Vice President of Regional Affairs. From October 2005 through September 2006, he served as HNBA President Elect. In September 2006-October 2007, he served as HNBA National President. He devoted countless hours and many resources to the HNBA and in time became a sought after mentor for lawyers and judges of all ages. He also created and instituted the HNBA Legislative Day program and the Office of the HNBA Historian. In 2006, he established the first HNBA LGBT Committee. He created the HNBA first community outreach program called La Promesa en el Derecho ("The Promise in the Law"), a program designed to instill trust and confidence within the Latino community in the U.S. legal and government institutions. He continues his work in the HNBA and speaks throughout the country on the responsibilities of lawyers in America, in particular before local and state Hispanic bar associations.

In 2010, he was a recipient of the Ohtli Medal Award (the highest honor bestowed by the Mexican government for non-Mexican citizens). The Ohtli is awarded to persons that have been dedicated to opening pathways for Latinos living in the United States.

Reyna has authored two books and a large number of articles on international trade topics and issues. In addition, he was the founder, and served as the Senior Editor, of the Hispanic National Bar Association Journal of Law and Policy.

Reyna is a noted speaker. He developed his own speaker program that takes him throughout the country speaking before America's youth and, in particular, the many local and state Hispanic bar associations. His messages are inspirational and move audiences to seek excellence in their work and diligence towards meeting life goals. In addition, he is a frequent keynote speaker before local, state and national bar associations that are devoted to intellectual property law.

In February 2016, the Minnesota IP Inn of Court voted to change its name to the Honorable Jimmie V. Reyna IP Inn of Court.

== See also ==
- List of Hispanic and Latino American jurists

Legal offices
Preceded by Haldane Robert Mayer	Judge of the United States Court of Appeals for the Federal Circuit; 2011–present	Incumbent
