= George W. Miller (judge) =

American judge (1941–2016)

Judge of the United States Court of Federal Claims
- In office December 13, 2003 – August 7, 2013
- Appointed by: George W. Bush
- Preceded by: James T. Turner
- Succeeded by: Richard Hertling

Personal details
- Born: July 12, 1941 Schenectady, New York, U.S.
- Died: June 27, 2016 (aged 74) Falls Church, Virginia, U.S.
- Education: Princeton University (BA); Harvard University (JD); George Washington University (LLM)

George Wesley Miller (July 12, 1941 – June 27, 2016) was a judge of the United States Court of Federal Claims, appointed to that court in 2004 by President George W. Bush.

== Early life, education, and career ==
Born in Schenectady, New York, Miller received a Bachelor of Arts, magna cum laude, from Princeton University in 1963, a Juris Doctor from Harvard Law School in 1966, and a Master of Laws in taxation from the George Washington University Law School in 1968. He was a law clerk to Judge Bruce M. Forrester of the United States Tax Court from 1966 to 1967, and was then an officer in the U.S. Navy Judge Advocate General Corps until 1970.

Miller was a trial attorney at Hogan & Hartson (now Hogan Lovells) for 33 years, from 1970 to 2004, including 26 years as a partner. He handled a broad range of civil litigation and commercial arbitration matters, developing an active practice representing both property owners and governmental entities in "takings" cases. His clients included Whitney Benefits, Inc. and Peter Kiewit Sons' Co., for whom he secured a $200 million settlement in 1995. In 1985, he was appointed by the District of Columbia Court of Appeals to the court's Board of Professional Responsibility, a nine-member panel that administers the lawyer disciplinary system in the District of Columbia. He served as Vice Chairman from 1988 to 1989, and then as Chairman until 1991). He was on the D.C. Court of Appeals Task Force on Racial and Ethnic Bias in the D.C. Courts from 1990 to 1992, and on the United States Court of Appeals for the District of Columbia Advisory Committee on Admissions and Grievances from 2002 to 2004.

In 1994, then Chief Loren A. Smith appointed Miller to the Court of Federal Claims Advisory Council, which consists of Court of Federal Claims bar members whose practices are representative of the court's docket. The Council advises the court on matters pertaining to court administration and the court's relationship with the bar and the public. Miller was re-appointed to the Advisory Council in 1999 by then Chief Lawrence M. Baskir and was a member of the Advisory Council at the time of his appointment to the court. Miller assisted in planning, and was one of several moderators at, an April 1999 symposium sponsored by the U. S. Court of Federal Claims entitled, "When Does Retroactivity Cross the Line? Winstar, Eastern Enterprises and Beyond," held in Washington, D. C. The proceedings were published in 51 ALA. L. REV. 933-1379 (2000). He also served on a court-appointed Litigation Practice Task Force, which was established following the 1995 Judicial Conference of the Court of Federal Claims to consider ways to expedite proceedings and improve the litigation process in the court. Miller was also a member of the U.S. Court of Federal Claims Bar Association's Board of Governors and served on the Board at the time of his appointment to the United States Court of Federal Claims.

=== Claims court service ===
Miller was appointed to the United States Court of Federal Claims by President George W. Bush. He received his commission as a judge on December 13, 2003. He retired in on August 7, 2013.

== Memberships ==
Miller was admitted to the Bars of Virginia, the District of Columbia, and New York.

== Personal life ==
He was married to Mary Katherine "Kay" Miller, with whom he had three children. Miller died on June 27, 2016, in Falls Church, Virginia.

Legal offices
Preceded by James T. Turner	Judge of the United States Court of Federal Claims; 2003–2013	Succeeded by Richard Hertling
