= James T. Turner =

American judge

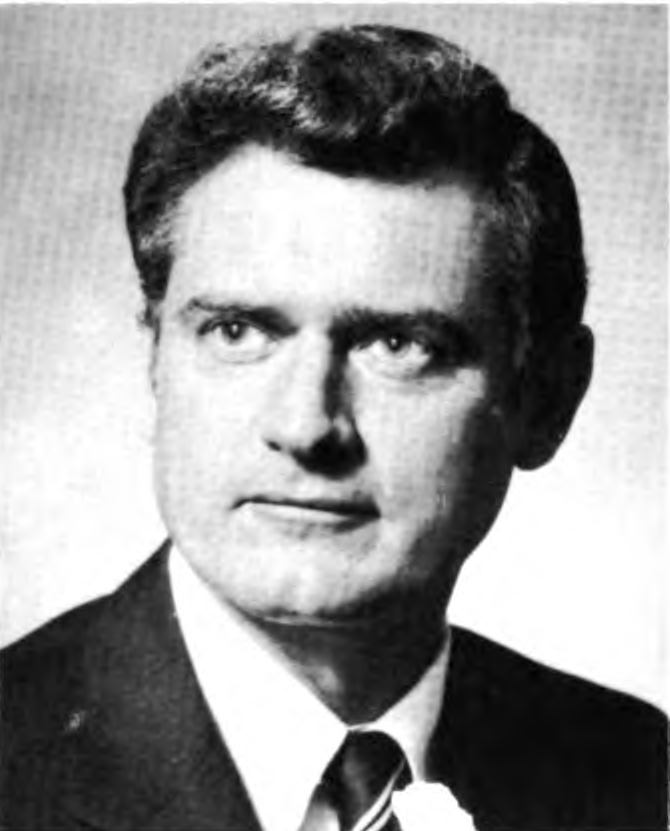

Senior Judge of the United States Claims Court
- Incumbent
- Assumed office July 2, 2002

Judge of the United States Claims Court
- In office July 2, 1987 – July 2, 2002
- Appointed by: Ronald Reagan
- Preceded by: Haldane Mayer
- Succeeded by: George Miller

Personal details
- Born: James Thomas Turner; March 12, 1938 (age 88) Clifton Forge, Virginia, U.S.
- Spouse: Patricia Renfrow
- Education: Wake Forest College (BA); University of Virginia (LLB)

Military service
- Allegiance: United States
- Branch/service: United States Army
- Years of service: 1960–1962
- Rank: Captain
- Unit: Army Military Intelligence Corps; Army Reserve

James Thomas Turner (born March 12, 1938) is a senior judge of the United States Claims Court (now named the United States Court of Federal Claims).

== Education and career ==
Turner received his Bachelor of Arts from Wake Forest College in 1960 and his Bachelor of Laws from the University of Virginia School of Law in 1965.

In 1960 he was a desk reporter and copy desk employee for the Winston-Salem Journal in Winston-Salem, North Carolina. In 1963 he was general laborer and clerical worker for a construction company in Charlottesville, Virginia. From 1963 to 1965 he was a legal assistant for the law firm of Deets and Martin in Charlottesville, Virginia.

He was formerly in the private practice of law in Norfolk, Virginia, 1965–1979 with the firm Williams, Worrell, Kelly & Greer. He served in the United States Army from 1960 to 1962, achieving the rank of captain.

== Federal judicial service ==
=== District court service ===
Turner was appointed a United States magistrate judge for the United States District Court for the Eastern District of Virginia in July 1979 and served in that position until his appointment as Judge of the United States Court of Federal Claims.

=== Claims court service ===
On April 23, 1987, he was nominated by President Reagan to a seat on the Court of Claims vacated by Haldane Robert Mayer who was elevated to the Federal Circuit. On June 3, 1987, a hearing was held on his nomination. He was reported out of committee on June 23, 1987. On July 1, 1987, he was confirmed in the United States Senate by voice vote. He was appointed Judge to the United States Court of Federal Claims on July 2, 1987, and entered on duty on August 19, 1987. He became a senior judge on July 2, 2002.

== Personal life ==
He is married to the former Patricia Renfrow and has one son, James, III.

== Memberships ==
He is a member of the American Bar Association, Virginia Bar Association, Virginia State Bar, and Norfolk and Portsmouth Bar Association.

Legal offices
Preceded by Haldane Robert Mayer	Judge of the United States Court of Federal Claims; 1987–2002	Succeeded by George Miller
