= Haldane Robert Mayer =

American judge

Haldane Mayer
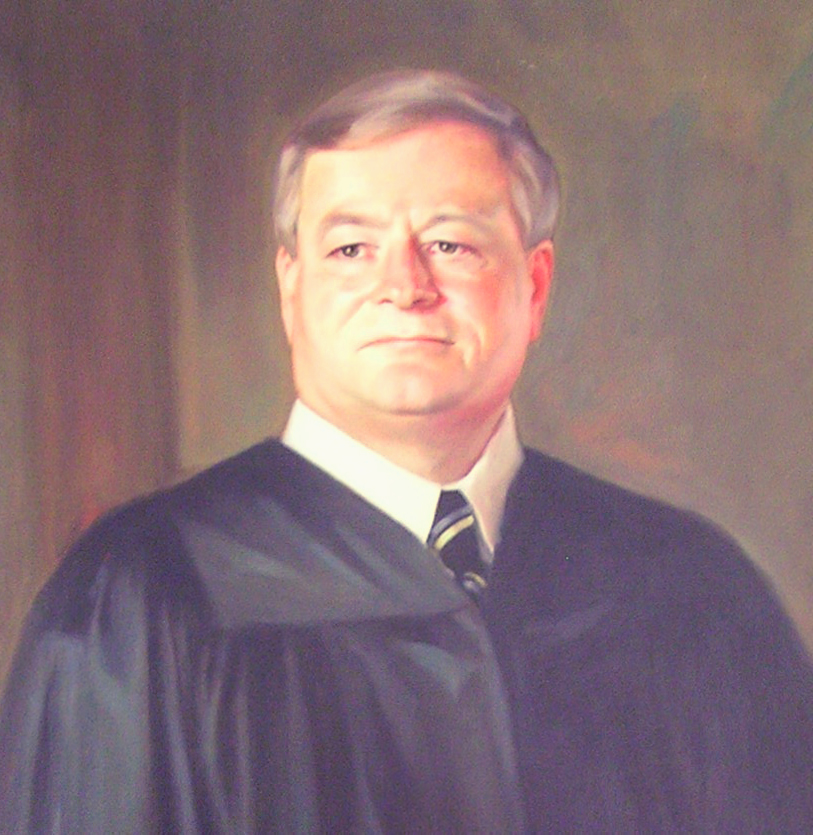

Senior Judge of the United States Court of Appeals for the Federal Circuit
- Incumbent
- Assumed office June 30, 2010

Chief Judge of the United States Court of Appeals for the Federal Circuit
- In office December 24, 1997 – December 25, 2004
- Preceded by: Glenn L. Archer Jr.
- Succeeded by: Paul Redmond Michel

Judge of the United States Court of Appeals for the Federal Circuit
- In office June 15, 1987 – June 30, 2010
- Appointed by: Ronald Reagan
- Preceded by: Marion T. Bennett
- Succeeded by: Jimmie V. Reyna

Judge of the United States Claims Court
- In office December 10, 1982 – June 19, 1987
- Appointed by: Ronald Reagan
- Preceded by: Seat established
- Succeeded by: James T. Turner

Personal details
- Born: Haldane Robert Mayer; February 21, 1941 (age 84); Buffalo, New York, U.S.
- Education: United States Military Academy (BS); College of William and Mary (JD)

Haldane Robert Mayer (born February 21, 1941) is a senior United States circuit judge of the United States Court of Appeals for the Federal Circuit.

== Education and military service ==
Mayer was born in Buffalo, New York, to Haldane and Myrtle Mayer. He was educated in the public schools of Lockport, New York. Mayer was appointed to the United States Military Academy by Representative William E. Miller, and received a Bachelor of Science degree in 1963. Mayer served in the United States Army from 1963 to 1975. He was awarded the Bronze Star, Meritorious Service, and Army Commendation Medals, the Combat Infantryman Badge, Parachutist Badge, Ranger Tab, and Ranger Combat Badge for his service during the Vietnam War. He took leave from the Army to attend the William & Mary Law School, where he was editor-in-chief of the William and Mary Law Review. He graduated first in his class and received his Juris Doctor in 1971. He attended The Judge Advocate General's Legal Center and School at the University of Virginia.

== Later career ==
Mayer served as special assistant to the Chief Justice of the United States, Warren E. Burger, for three years, and as law clerk to Judge John D. Butzner Jr., of the United States Court of Appeals for the Fourth Circuit. He was in private practice in Charlottesville, Virginia, in the 1970s, and in Washington, D.C., in 1980 and 1981. He was Deputy and Acting Special Counsel at the United States Merit Systems Protection Board from 1981 to 1982.

=== Federal judicial service ===
President Ronald Reagan appointed him to the United States Claims Court in 1982, where he served until 1987. Mayer was nominated by President Ronald Reagan on February 3, 1987, to a seat on the United States Court of Appeals for the Federal Circuit vacated by Judge Marion T. Bennett. He was confirmed by the United States Senate on June 11, 1987, and received commission on June 15, 1987. He served as Chief Judge from 1997 to 2004. Mayer assumed senior status on June 30, 2010. He was an adjunct professor at the George Washington University Law School and the University of Virginia School of Law. He was a member of the Judicial Conference of the United States from 1997 to 2004.

=== Notable decisions ===
Mayer wrote a concurring opinion in Intellectual Ventures v. Symantec, that controversially argues that "(1) patents constricting the essential channels of online communication run afoul of the First Amendment; and (2) claims directed to software implemented on a generic computer are categorically not eligible for patent."

== Personal life ==
Mayer married Mary Anne McCurdy on August 13, 1966. They had two daughters, Anne Christian and Rebecca Paige.

Legal offices
New seat	Judge of the United States Claims Court; 1982–1987	Succeeded by James T. Turner
Preceded by Marion T. Bennett	Judge of the United States Court of Appeals for the Federal Circuit; 1987–2010	Succeeded by Jimmie V. Reyna
Preceded by Glenn L. Archer Jr.	Chief Judge of the United States Court of Appeals for the Federal Circuit; 1997–2004	Succeeded by Paul Redmond Michel
