= William Overstreet Jr. =

American WWII fighter pilot (1921–2013)

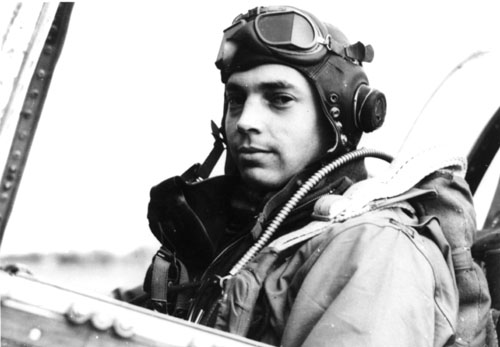
- Born: April 10, 1921; Clifton Forge, Virginia, United States
- Died: December 29, 2013 (aged 92); Roanoke, Virginia, United States
- Spouse: Juanita Elizabeth Brackens
- Military career
- Allegiance: United States of America
- Branch: United States Army Air Forces
- Service years: 1942–1945
- Rank: Captain
- Unit: 363rd Fighter Squadron 357th Fighter Group
- Conflicts: World War II

William Bruce "Bill" Overstreet Jr. (April 10, 1921 – December 29, 2013) was an American fighter pilot and a veteran of the 357th Fighter Group, 363rd Fighter Squadron of the United States Army Air Forces during World War II. He is best known for pursuing a German Messerschmitt Bf 109G underneath the arches of the Eiffel Tower in 1944.

== Early life ==
William B. Overstreet Jr., was born April 10, 1921, in Clifton Forge, Virginia. His parents were William B. Overstreet and Nannie Gertrude Taylor. William had two older sisters, Bernice Elvin Overstreet and Melvene Gertrude Overstreet.

William graduated from Clifton Forge High School May 31, 1938. While a student, he was a member of the Junior League his freshman year. Orchestra as a Sophomore, Junior, and Senior. Glee Club as a Sophomore, Junior, and Senior. Part of the V.L. Club where he served as Treasurer, Secretary and finally President. He was in Beta Club his Junior and Senior years. Student Council his Senior year. Bill received the School League Award and American Legion Award prior to graduation.

== Military career ==
William enlisted in the U.S. Army on August 12, 1942. He intended to become an Aviation Cadet. He was accepted as an Aviation Cadet on September 1, 1942, by letter from the CO of the Santa Ana Army Air Base in California.

Overstreet began his training at Rankin Aeronautical Academy in Tulare, California. Once complete he transferred to Air Force Advanced Flying School. After completing training he transferred again to Luke Field, Arizona in April 1943. William graduated and earned his Silver Wings at Luke Field on May 20, 1943. After being discharged as an enlisted man, he was re-enlisted as a 2nd Lt. and assigned to the 363rd Fighter Squadron 357th Fighter Group stationed at Santa Rosa, California.

On June 28, 1943, William was involved in a plane crash while training. The accident was described by William as:

"We had completed several aileron rolls, a loop, and some turns in order to hold our position. Then the Flight Leader, Lt. Bochkay, started an aileron roll to the left. I am confident it was started with plenty of airspeed. However, when the ship was approximately in an inverted position, it tumbled. I did not make any sharp movements with the stick that could have caused it, but possibly did use excessive rudder. Truthfully, I cannot state the real cause as I can think of nothing wrong with the plane, maneuver, or execution of the maneuver that could have caused a tumble. When it tumbled, I attempted to recover by trying to hold the nose straight down and once, while in an inverted flat spin, I thought I had it under control but instead, it tumbled again. While I was beaten around in the cockpit a lot, and everything happened so fast that I am not positive of all the plane's actions, apparently it tumbled, went into a flat inverted spin, tumbled again, went into another flat inverted spin and then tumbled on down. At somewhere near three thousand (3,000) or four thousand (4,000) feet I decided to jump but had a little trouble getting the door off. Finally, after both pulling the emergency release and the safety catch, I kicked the right door off and then jumped out. I was then between two hundred (200) and three hundred (300) feet, so I pulled the ripcord immediately and landed between five (5) and ten (10) feet from the plane within two (2) seconds after the parachute opened. I was uninjured, so I got up and signaled the Flight Leader who was circling near me that I was alright."

On August 27, 1943, Overstreet transferred to Tonopah, Nevada for additional training. After completing training over the desert, he was transferred back to California and then on to Caspar, Wyoming prior to traveling to the east coast to prepare for overseas duty.

=== World War II ===
William and the 363rd Fighter Squadron arrived overseas in England and were initially stationed on December 1, 1943, at USAAF Station 157, RAF Raydon as part of the Ninth Air Force. It wasn't long before the 357th Fighter Group was transferred to the station at Leiston where they would serve out the war as part of the Eighth Air Force. The Group became operational in February 1944 and Overstreet had his first "claim to fame" as he called it, when he flew unconscious for 90-minutes during the March 27, 1944 mission. His oxygen mask failed for a time at a higher altitude and he passed out. He regained consciousness and was forced to land at nearby Debden rather than Leiston.

==== April 11, 1944 – The first claims ====
Overstreet's first two claims as a fighter pilot came on April 11, 1944, mission. In the first claim, Overstreet shared a destroyed claim to a HE-11K with Captain Anderson, Lt. Simpson, and 2nd Lt. Kayser. In the Encounter Report he described it as follows.

The flight (Chamber White) was making practically a gunnery pattern on the ship. I sat right behind it, firing, from about 150 yards, closing in to about 100 yards, and observed hits in the fuselage and engine. As soon as I pulled up, the E/A hit the ground and exploded. I claim one HE-11K (shared).

That same day, William reported a Damaged Me 109 stating the following in the Encounter Report.

The Me 109 did a tight turn on the ground, evidently hoping we'd leave him. Several P-51s made quick passes at him and then I got right behind him. He then leveled out and tried to pull away from us. I only had one gun firing by then and observed hits at the cockpit. He was smoking slightly, but I followed him for some time on the deck, pulling away only when out of ammunition. I began firing from [unreadable] yards closing to about 100 yards. I experienced no trouble keeping on his tail then on the deck. I claim a Me 109 damaged.

==== May 12, 1944 – Destroyed Ju 52 claim ====
Overstreet made another claim for a Destroyed Ju 52 on a mission May 12, 1944 while flying with Captain Clarence "Bud" Anderson who led a group of fighters, on a mission to Czech oil plants. Anderson's account of the sortie is as follows.

I was leading Cement Blue Flight and while down on the deck; after having shot down a Me 109, we came upon a small grass airfield with no runways and a few hangars on the north and south ends of the field. I saw a Me 109 land and taxi towards the hangar line so I called the flight and we all went down. I caught the 109 that had landed just as he pulled up to the line and stopped. I opened fire at long range and closed getting a good concentrated pattern all the while – I did not see the pilot get out. I then hit the deck pulled over the trees and down the other side of a ridge that was on the south end of the field – there I saw tracers for the first time but not close to me.

My #2, Lt. Overstreet, moved down on my right and strafed a Ju. 52 parked by a hangar on the south side of the field – he saw good strikes from nose to tail and it was smoking when he left. Lt. Overstreet claimed one Destroyed Ju. 52.

My #3, Lt. Pierce, saw a Me 109 bellied in on the west edge – in good shape – and gave it a good strafe job getting hits all over. It caught on fire. Lt. Pierce looked back and saw the Me 109 I strafed smoking badly.

My #4, Lt. Michaely did not fire.

Two aircraft from the Greenhouse Squadron were above and watched us joining in later.

==== June 29, 1944 – Destroyed FW 190 claim ====
On a mission to France on June 17, 1944, Overstreet made another claim – a destroyed FW 190. His encounter report reads as follows.

I was flying Cement Red #4 when we bounced eight FW-190s. We dived down on their tail. Captain ANDERSON Red Flight #1 was firing at the leader of the formation who soon bailed out. I was closing on the FW-190 on our right when he started to roll over to the left. I was still out of range but closing fast so I opened fire as the ship flipped over the pilot bailed out. Then I broke off to rejoin Red #3.

==== July 29, 1944 – Destroyed FW 190 in the air ====
On this day, Overstreet entered many claims into the official records. One destroyed Me 109 in the air. One destroyed FW 190 on the ground. A damaged FW 190 on the ground and a probable destroy for a Do 217. Overstreet's statement in the Encounter Reports read:

Entry #1. On July 29, I chased a 109 to the deck and had a wing in the grass when he blew up. He must have been trying to get to his base because we were close to a German airfield. My wingman, Harold Hand, and I made a pass and destroyed another 109 and damaged a Do 217. I went back and got another 109 but I found that I was alone. I asked Hand where he was and he replied, "I am giving you top cover."

Entry #2

I was flying Cement Red #3 and my wingman and I were making a pass on a large field. As we did a Me 109 dove on us slightly to our right. I turned into him as soon as I was across the field and he was fairly close. He turned right leaving me right behind him. Using the gyro gunsight I fired about 30° deflection and got hits. I think the range was about 350 yards. I closed in still firing and hit his coolant. He dropped down right on the ground and as my wing was in the grass I had to pull up. Pieces of the 109 made holes in my canopy. They gyro gunsight (K-14) worked extremely well and I think was responsible for getting the hits at first. I claim one Me 109 destroyed in the air.

Operation Frantic V

William was selected to be one of the fighter pilots for the OPERATION FRANTIC V mission to Russia and Italy in August 1944. During this Shuttle Run, the pilots escorted bombers to Poland, Russia, Italy, made a special run to pick up downed airmen in Yugoslavia, and then returned to Leiston in England.

Overstreet completed one tour of duty overseas before being shipped back to the states. Prior to departing Leiston he filed his September 1944 Flight Record which stated, "COMBAT OPERATIONAL TOUR OF DUTY COMPLETED." A combat tour was logged at 300 combat flying hours. Bill's final Combat Time was 301:25. Having flown 50 sorties, received the Air Medal with three Oak Leaf Clusters and a Distinguished Flying Cross (DFC), and he was recommended for the first Oak Leaf Cluster for the DFC be awarded on basis of forty sorties and one enemy aircraft destroyed. William achieved the rank of Captain on September 15, 1944, just prior to shipping back to the states after he completed his tour of duty.

==== Stateside service (October 1944 – October 24, 1945) ====
Upon return to the states, after processing through Fort Benjamin Harrison and a short furlough, Overstreet reported to the Army Air Force Redistribution Station No. 2 in Miami Beach, Florida on November 13, 1944, for reassignment and processing. From there he was sent to teach gunnery at Pinellas Army Airfield in Florida. By August 30, 1945, William was transferred to the Perry Army Airfield in Perry, Florida as a member of the 342nd AAF Base Unit. Once there he was transferred again to prepare for discharge. Overstreet was Honorably discharged on October 24, 1945, at Indiantown Gap, Pennsylvania.

== Awards and campaigns ==
William was credited with the following Campaigns: Rhineland, Normandy, Northern France, Air Offensive Europe, Rome Arno. He received the following awards.

- Air Medal with 10 oak leaf clusters
- American Campaign Medal
- Croix de Guerre with palm (France)
- Distinguished Flying Cross with one bronze oak leaf cluster
- Distinguished Unit Citation
- European-African-Middle Eastern Campaign Medal
- Russian Medal – The 50th Anniversary of the Victory of the Great Patriotic War (WWII). Issued 21 June 1995.
- Yugoslavian Medal – Commemorative War Cross 1941–45 of the Royal Yugoslav Army. Issued 8 May 1965.

Late in life, Overstreet was awarded France's highest military award, the Legion of Honour, by French Ambassador to the United States Pierre Vimont at a ceremony held at the National D-Day Memorial in Bedford, Virginia, on June 6, 2009.

== Personal life and death ==
William married Juanita "Nita" Elizabeth Brackens on December 26, 1944, at the Granbery Memorial Methodist Church in Granbery, Virginia. After the war, the couple moved to Charleston, West Virginia where Bill held several jobs before starting college using the benefits provided by the G.I. Bill.

Overstreet never stopped flying after his discharge from the Army Air Forces after the war. On April 6, 1947, he and his wife Nita took a trip from their home in Charleston, West Virginia, where he worked at Billinger Field. William was flying the Cub Bill in high winds when the plane capsized upon landing at Covington Airport. The couple was taken to Alleghany Memorial Hospital in Covington to be examined after the crash where they were found to be ok and released soon after admittance.

William attended the National Business College School of Business and Secretarial Science in Roanoke, Virginia. His coursework in Accountancy and Business Administration began in June 1951. After two years of coursework, he still needed to have two years of practical experience before he could take his Certified Public Accountant (CPA) exams. He worked for a firm called Andrews Burket & Co. A year later, he officially graduated from college on June 12, 1954, with a degree in Accounting and Business Administration and Commercial Science. William took his CPA exams and received his license and certificate in January 1955.

Throughout the rest of his life, William focused on family, faith, and community. He built his and Nita's dream home in Roanoke. Ran a successful CPA business. The couple traveled and golfed often as they both enjoyed the sport. Overstreet also gave back to his community in ways of money, service, and personal history at local museums.

During the war, William lost a close friend and fellow fighter pilot named Edward "Eddie" Simpson. This loss haunted him the rest of his life. To honor his friend, William funded in perpetuity a college scholarship program in Eddie's name. The Community Foundation serving Western Virginia pulls together many funding sources to serve its area of Southwest Virginia including the Greater Roanoke Valley. The scholarship is listed as Eddie Simpson Scholarship Fund.

Finally, while no longer an active organization, Overstreet was an integral part of the 357th Fighter Group Association. This group held reunions around the country where veterans, family, and friends gathered to talk about the war, share stories and information, and view the aircraft.

William and Juanita both lived long lives. Juanita died November 1, 1999, at Roanoke Carilion Hospital in Roanoke, Virginia. She was buried at Evergreen Burial Park in Roanoke. William died on December 29, 2013, at the age of 92. He was also buried in Evergreen Burial Park.

== Further reading and oral histories ==
=== Books ===
Anderson, Clarence E. "Bud" Anderson with Joseph P. Hamelin. To Fly and Fight Memories of a Triple Ace. Pacifica, California: Pacifica Military Museum, 1990.

Maddox, Joey. Bleeding Sky. The Story of Captain Fletcher E. Adams and the 357th Fighter Group. U.S.: Xlibris, 2009.

Olmsted, Merle C. The 357th Over Europe. St. Paul, Minnesota: Phalanx Publishing Co, 1994.

Olmsted USAF (Ret), MSGT Merle C. To War with the Yoxford Boys. The Complete Story of the 357th Fighter Group. Hamilton, MT: Eagles Editions, Ltd, 2004.

Olmsted, Merle C. The Yoxford Boys. The 357th Fighter Group on Escort Over Europe and Russia. Fallbrook, California: Aero Publishers, Inc. 1971.

=== Oral histories and websites ===
Bill Riley. "Captain William (Bill) Overstreet USAAF Interview 11/13/02." Posted 12 January 2014. YouTube video. https://www.youtube.com/watch?v=_cb9-FFJINM

Bill Riley. "357th Fighter Group Series Proposed Introductory Sequence." Posted 15 January 2014. YouTube video. https://www.youtube.com/watch?v=QyBwdvLXEnY

Bill Riley. "Bill Overstreet Roanoke Transportation Museum Video 1." Posted 23 January 2015. YouTube video. https://www.youtube.com/watch?v=8VUusvU6dBw

Bill Riley. "Bill Overstreet Roanoke Transportation Museum Video 2." Posted 23 January 2015. YouTube video. https://www.youtube.com/watch?v=njpWjDAlabama4K8

Bill Riley. "Bill Overstreet Roanoke Transportation Museum Video 3." Posted 23 January 2015. YouTube video. https://www.youtube.com/watch?v=d6OHAYPsVKE

To Fly and Fight. "Interview with Captain William B. "Bill" Overstreet, 363rd FS." https://toflyandfight.com/interview-with-captain-william-b-bill-overstreet-363rd-fs/
