= Densmore, Kansas =

Unincorporated community in Norton County, Kansas

- Unincorporated community
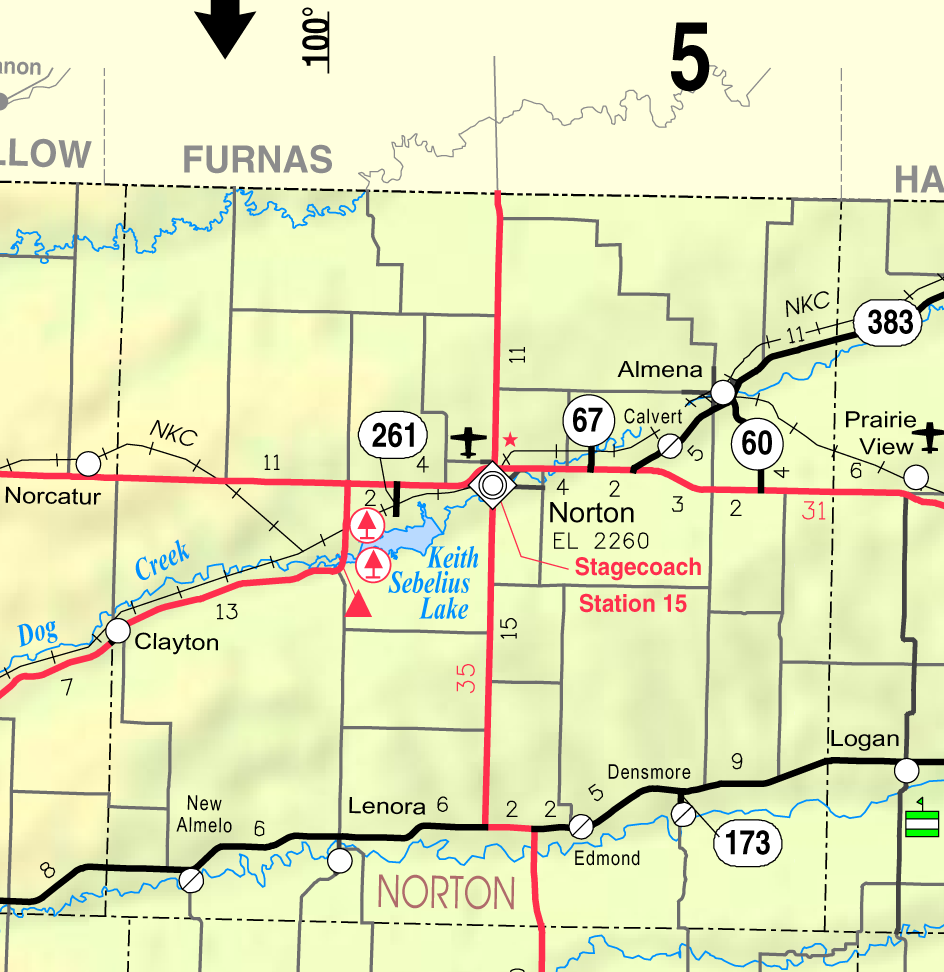
- KDOT map of Norton County (legend)

- Location within Kansas Location within the United States
- Coordinates: 39°38′18″N 99°44′21″W
- Country: United States
- State: Kansas
- County: Norton
- Founded: 1880s
- Elevation: 2,080 ft (630 m)
- Time zone: UTC-6 (CST)
  - Summer (DST): UTC-5 (CDT)
- ZIP Code: 67645
- Area code: 785
- FIPS code: 20-17700
- GNIS ID: 472018

Densmore is an unincorporated community in Norton County, Kansas, United States, approximately two miles east of the city of Edmond near K-9 highway.

== History ==
Densmore was a station on the Missouri Pacific Railroad.

Densmore had a post office from 1880 until 1992.

== Education ==
Densmore is served by Logan USD 326 public school district.

Densmore High School was closed in 1965 through school unification. The Densmore High School mascot was Warriors.

== Notable people ==
Glenn L. Archer Jr., a judge of the United States Court of Appeals for the Federal Circuit, was born here.
