= Jefferson School (Clifton Forge, Virginia) =

Historic building in Virginia, US

- U.S. National Register of Historic Places
- Virginia Landmarks Register
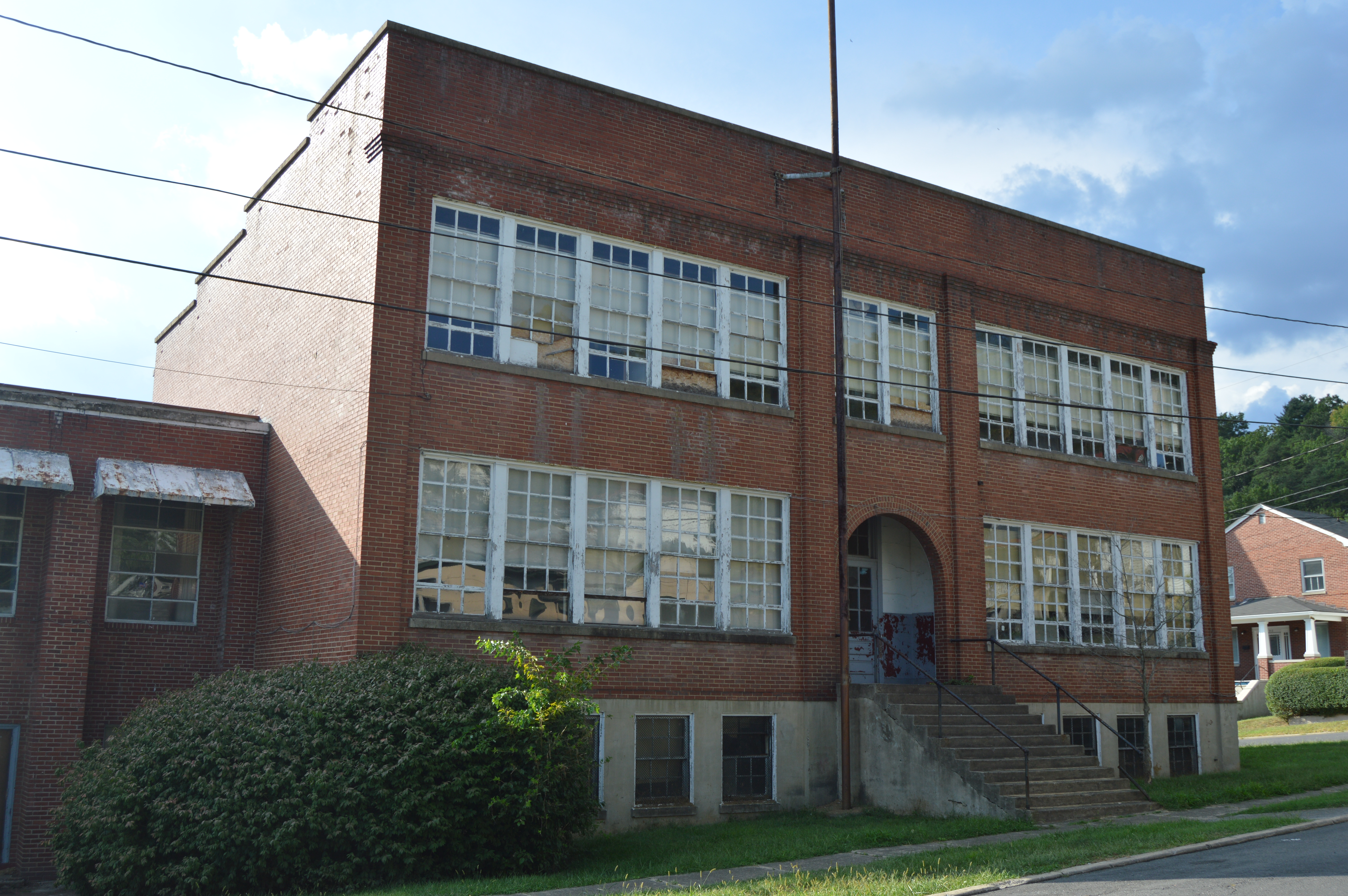
- Front of the school

- Location within Virginia Location within the United States
- Location: A Street, Clifton Forge, Virginia
- Coordinates: 37°48′57″N 79°49′8″W
- Area: 1.2 acres (0.49 ha)
- Built: 1926, 1952-1953
- NRHP reference No.: 10001061
- VLR No.: 105-0171

Significant dates
- Added to NRHP: December 27, 2010
- Designated VLR: September 30, 2010

Jefferson School, also known as East Elementary and Clifton Forge Elementary East, is a historic school building located at Clifton Forge, Alleghany County, Virginia. It was built in 1926, as a rectangular two-story building is clad in running-bond brick in the Colonial Revival style. It sits on a raised concrete foundation and has ribbons of small-paned double-hung windows and a recessed front entrance.

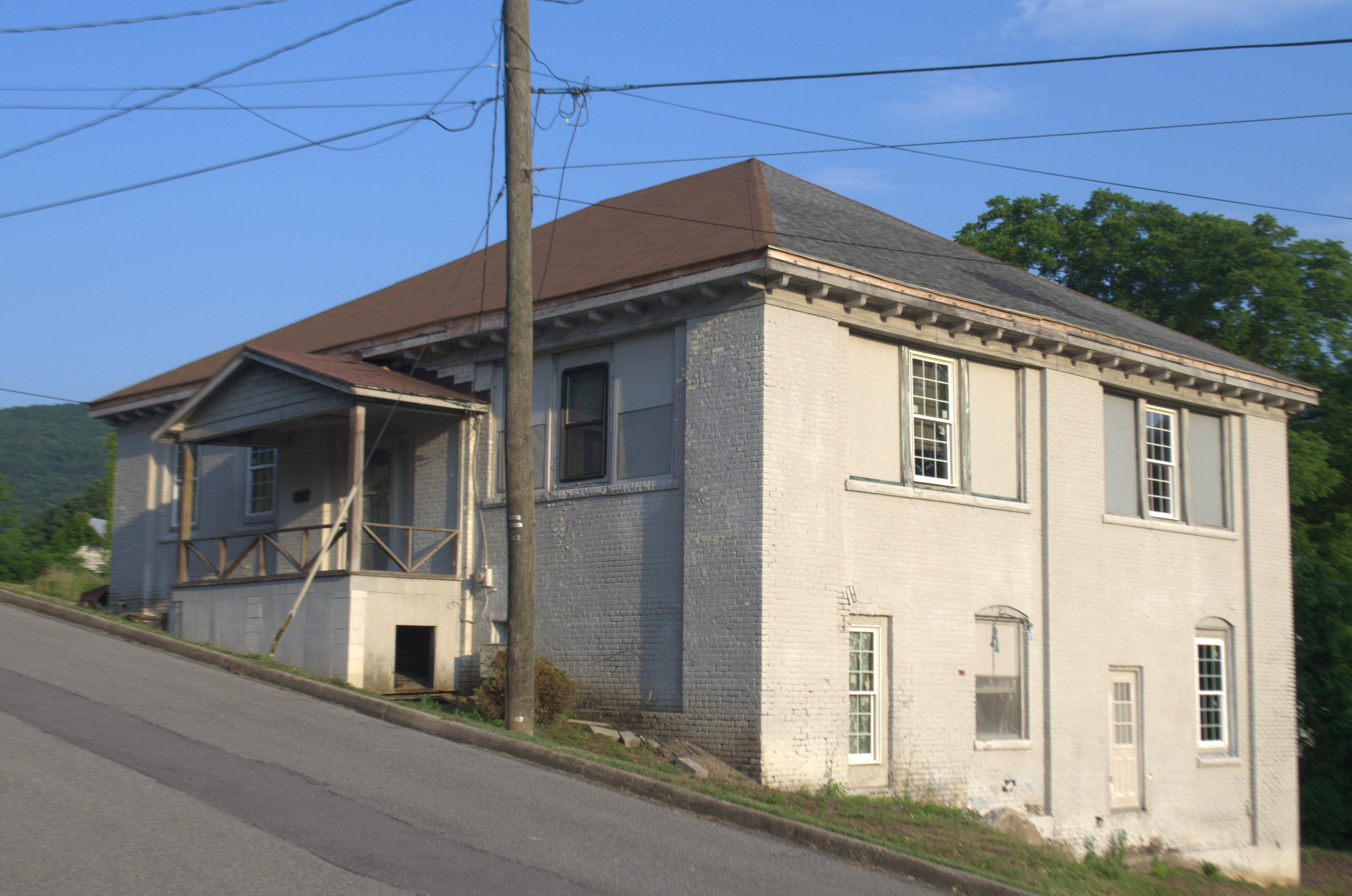
Previous 1902 Jefferson School (Clifton Forge, Virginia)

A library and cafeteria were not added until 1937, when improvements also included water fountains, a public address system and projector. The town high school built for White Americans in 1928 had a cafeteria and libraries were required for schools by 1902. A two-story rectangular addition was built in 1952. 1952 improvements included more classrooms, an auditorium/gymnasium, an Industrial arts shop and an office for the principal. Teachers had no offices. The school provided primary and secondary school education for African Americans attending school in the Clifton Forge community from 1926 until 1965. It was added to the National Register of Historic Places in 2010.

The previous building from 1902 is just around the corner from the 1926 school.
