= 1908 United States presidential election in Virginia =

- November 3, 1908
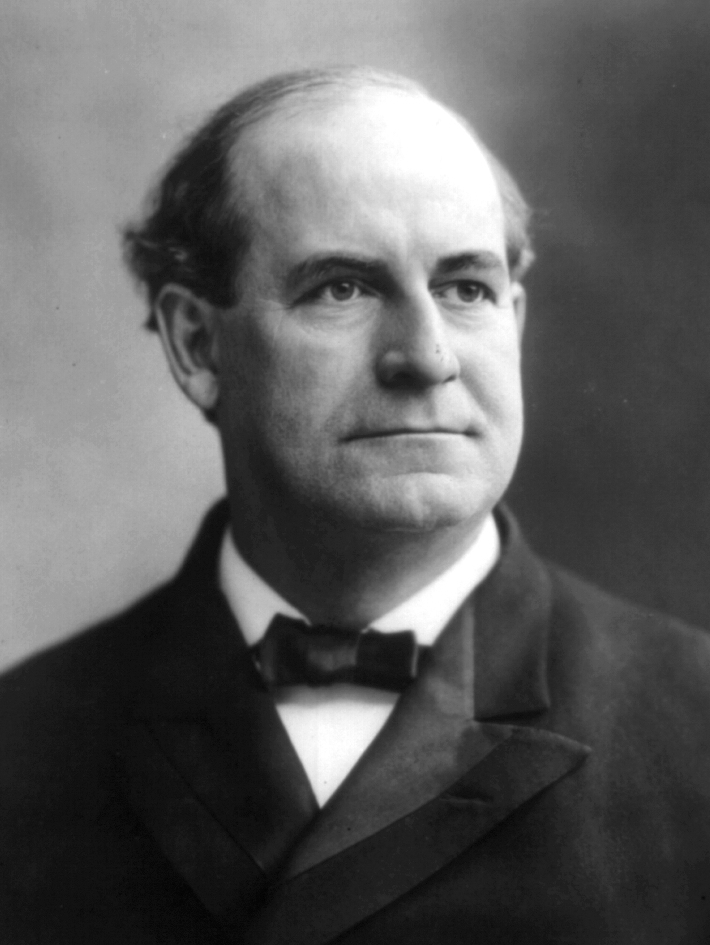

Nominee	William Jennings Bryan	William Howard Taft
Party	Democratic	Republican
Home state	Nebraska	Ohio
Running mate	John W. Kern	James S. Sherman
Electoral vote	12	0
Popular vote	82,946	52,572
Percentage	60.52%	38.36%
County and independent city results
Bryan
40–50%
50–60%
60–70%
70–80%
80–90%
Taft
40–50%
50–60%
60–70%
70–80%
President before election
Theodore Roosevelt
Republican
Elected President
William Howard Taft
Republican

The 1908 United States presidential election in Virginia took place on November 3, 1908, as part of the 1908 United States presidential election. Voters chose twelve representatives, or electors to the Electoral College, who voted for president and vice president.

The 1900s had seen Virginia, like all former Confederate States, almost completely disenfranchise its black and poor white populations through the use of a cumulative poll tax and literacy tests. So severe was the disenfranchising effect of the new 1902 Constitution that the electorate for the 1904 presidential election was halved compared to that of previous elections, and it has been calculated that a third of those who voted were state employees and officeholders. The limited electorate meant Virginian politics was controlled by political machines — firstly one led by Thomas Staples Martin and after he died the Byrd Organization.

However, unlike the Deep South, historical fusion with the “Readjuster” Democrats, defection of substantial proportions of the Northeast-aligned white electorate of the Shenandoah Valley and Southwest Virginia over free silver, and an early move towards a “lily white” Jim Crow party meant that in general elections the Republicans retained around one-third of the small statewide electorate.

Following the failure of Theodore Roosevelt to reconcile with the South, and a hiccup when Republican elector and long-time Lily-White party leader William H. Robinson refused to support party nominee, former Secretary of War William Howard Taft because he was a Unitarian, Taft would in July stay for a month in Hot Springs and in October become the first Republican candidate to tour the Confederacy. Early in the campaign third-time Democratic candidate William Jennings Bryan criticised Taft as adopting Democratic policies in a slavish manner, but during his later tour of Virginia, Taft was very critical of Bryan for focusing too much on short-term issues. In front of a crowd of twelve thousand in Richmond, Taft argued that he was the man to bring Virginia and the northern states closer together, and that voting for Republican candidates and policies was highly reasonable.

Despite the enthusiastic reception Taft received in Richmond, he was hindered by the fact that the Richmond Times-Dispatch, which had endorsed William McKinley twelve years previously, endorsed Bryan this time. Polls in mid-October saw Virginia as safe for Bryan, which would be confirmed at the beginning of the fourth week of that month. Bryan ultimately would win the state by a margin of 22.16 percentage points. At the time this was the largest margin in Virginia since Andrew Jackson won the state by 49.93 percentage points in 1832, although Woodrow Wilson, Franklin D. Roosevelt, Richard Nixon and Ronald Reagan have since surpassed Bryan's performance.

Bryan had previously won Virginia against William McKinley in both 1896 and 1900.

== Results ==
1908 United States presidential election in Virginia
Party	Candidate	Votes	Percentage	Electoral votes
Democratic	William Jennings Bryan	82,946	60.52%	12
Republican	William Howard Taft	52,572	38.36%	0
Prohibition	Eugene W. Chafin	1,111	0.81%	0
Socialist	Eugene V. Debs	255	0.19%	0
Populist	Thomas E. Watson	105	0.08%	0
Independence	Thomas L. Hisgen	51	0.04%	0
Socialist Labor	August Gillhaus	25	0.02%	0
Totals		137,065	100.0%	12

=== Results by county ===
1908 United States presidential election in Virginia by counties and independent cities
County or Independent City	William Jennings Bryan Democratic		William Howard Taft Republican		Eugene W. Chafin Prohibition		Other candidates Various parties		Margin		Total votes cast
County or Independent City	#	%	#	%	#	%	#	%	#	%	Total votes cast
Accomack County	1,748	81.64%	337	15.74%	58	2.71%	0	0.00%	1,411	65.90%	2,141
Albemarle County	999	71.05%	380	27.03%	7	0.50%	20	1.42%	619	44.03%	1,406
Alexandria County	354	67.82%	165	31.61%	54	5.58%	8	0.83%	189	36.21%	522
Alleghany County	422	43.64%	483	49.95%	2	0.62%	0	0.00%	-61	-6.31%	967
Amelia County	247	76.71%	73	22.67%	1	0.10%	1	0.10%	174	54.04%	322
Amherst County	849	83.65%	164	16.16%	2	0.27%	0	0.00%	685	67.49%	1,015
Appomattox County	633	84.18%	117	15.56%	0	0.00%	3	0.57%	516	68.62%	752
Augusta County	1,435	56.56%	987	38.90%	109	4.30%	6	0.24%	448	17.66%	2,537
Bath County	340	58.02%	232	39.59%	12	2.05%	2	0.34%	108	18.43%	586
Bedford County	1,275	71.11%	463	25.82%	45	2.51%	10	0.56%	812	45.29%	1,793
Bland County	339	45.81%	397	53.65%	4	0.54%	0	0.00%	-58	-7.84%	740
Botetourt County	808	50.16%	792	49.16%	11	0.68%	0	0.00%	16	0.99%	1,611
Brunswick County	507	79.84%	123	19.37%	5	0.79%	0	0.00%	384	60.47%	635
Buchanan County	395	38.35%	635	61.65%	0	0.00%	0	0.00%	-240	-23.30%	1,030
Buckingham County	676	66.86%	333	32.94%	2	0.20%	0	0.00%	343	33.93%	1,011
Campbell County	624	76.94%	174	21.45%	9	1.11%	4	0.49%	450	55.49%	811
Caroline County	494	59.73%	326	39.42%	6	0.73%	1	0.12%	168	20.31%	827
Carroll County	859	36.09%	1,521	63.91%	0	0.00%	0	0.00%	-662	-27.82%	2,380
Charles City County	99	53.51%	84	45.41%	0	0.00%	2	1.08%	15	8.11%	185
Charlotte County	537	68.49%	242	30.87%	4	0.51%	1	0.13%	295	37.63%	784
Chesterfield County	608	76.57%	167	21.03%	11	1.39%	8	1.01%	441	55.54%	794
Clarke County	517	85.88%	74	12.29%	7	1.16%	4	0.66%	443	73.59%	602
Craig County	364	61.38%	224	37.77%	5	0.84%	0	0.00%	140	23.61%	593
Culpeper County	962	80.37%	233	19.47%	2	0.17%	0	0.00%	729	60.90%	1,197
Cumberland County	374	84.62%	68	15.38%	0	0.00%	0	0.00%	306	69.23%	442
Dickenson County	551	44.87%	671	54.64%	0	0.00%	6	0.49%	-120	-9.77%	1,228
Dinwiddie County	445	73.80%	157	26.04%	1	0.17%	0	0.00%	288	47.76%	603
Elizabeth City County	673	71.67%	251	26.73%	10	1.06%	5	0.53%	422	44.94%	939
Essex County	364	74.74%	123	25.26%	0	0.00%	0	0.00%	241	49.49%	487
Fairfax County	1,143	73.27%	404	25.90%	10	0.64%	3	0.19%	739	47.37%	1,560
Fauquier County	1,354	78.58%	363	21.07%	4	0.23%	2	0.12%	991	57.52%	1,723
Floyd County	390	25.28%	1,149	74.47%	4	0.26%	0	0.00%	-759	-49.19%	1,543
Fluvanna County	451	76.83%	135	23.00%	0	0.00%	1	0.17%	316	53.83%	587
Franklin County	1,218	52.50%	1,101	47.46%	1	0.04%	0	0.00%	117	5.04%	2,320
Frederick County	866	69.56%	354	28.43%	25	2.01%	0	0.00%	512	41.12%	1,245
Giles County	705	53.13%	605	45.59%	14	1.06%	3	0.23%	100	7.54%	1,327
Gloucester County	477	83.10%	94	16.38%	0	0.00%	3	0.52%	383	66.72%	574
Goochland County	294	53.85%	246	45.05%	2	0.37%	4	0.73%	48	8.79%	546
Grayson County	841	40.36%	1,243	59.64%	0	0.00%	0	0.00%	-402	-19.29%	2,084
Greene County	252	40.78%	366	59.22%	0	0.00%	0	0.00%	-114	-18.45%	618
Greensville County	273	76.69%	77	21.63%	3	0.84%	3	0.84%	196	55.06%	356
Halifax County	1,268	65.63%	650	33.64%	8	0.41%	6	0.31%	618	31.99%	1,932
Hanover County	522	70.92%	204	27.72%	6	0.82%	4	0.54%	318	43.21%	736
Henrico County	627	74.11%	215	25.41%	3	0.35%	1	0.12%	412	48.70%	846
Henry County	761	51.11%	716	48.09%	7	0.47%	5	0.34%	45	3.02%	1,489
Highland County	292	47.25%	305	49.35%	21	3.40%	0	0.00%	-13	-2.10%	618
Isle of Wight County	530	72.70%	199	27.30%	0	0.00%	0	0.00%	331	45.40%	729
James City County	132	67.35%	62	31.63%	2	1.02%	0	0.00%	70	35.71%	196
King and Queen County	349	65.60%	181	34.02%	2	0.38%	0	0.00%	168	31.58%	532
King George County	296	59.80%	198	40.00%	0	0.00%	1	0.20%	98	19.80%	495
King William County	276	54.33%	228	44.88%	4	0.79%	0	0.00%	48	9.45%	508
Lancaster County	468	78.00%	122	20.33%	3	0.50%	7	1.17%	346	57.67%	600
Lee County	805	37.56%	1,334	62.25%	3	0.14%	1	0.05%	-529	-24.69%	2,143
Loudoun County	1,570	75.05%	447	21.37%	66	3.15%	9	0.43%	1,123	53.68%	2,092
Louisa County	692	69.83%	290	29.26%	6	0.61%	3	0.30%	402	40.57%	991
Lunenburg County	414	79.46%	105	20.15%	1	0.19%	1	0.19%	309	59.31%	521
Madison County	466	60.28%	305	39.46%	1	0.13%	1	0.13%	161	20.83%	773
Mathews County	577	86.25%	86	12.86%	4	0.60%	2	0.30%	491	73.39%	669
Mecklenburg County	1,000	79.24%	252	19.97%	6	0.48%	4	0.32%	748	59.27%	1,262
Middlesex County	413	71.58%	164	28.42%	0	0.00%	0	0.00%	249	43.15%	577
Montgomery County	734	47.45%	795	51.39%	11	0.71%	7	0.45%	-61	-3.94%	1,547
Nansemond County	857	75.04%	272	23.82%	11	0.96%	2	0.18%	585	51.23%	1,142
Nelson County	742	70.27%	308	29.17%	5	0.47%	1	0.09%	434	41.10%	1,056
New Kent County	193	54.52%	159	44.92%	0	0.00%	2	0.56%	34	9.60%	354
Norfolk County	879	54.33%	739	45.67%	0	0.00%	0	0.00%	140	8.65%	1,618
Northampton County	673	78.44%	174	20.28%	11	1.28%	0	0.00%	499	58.16%	858
Northumberland County	410	68.68%	185	30.99%	2	0.34%	0	0.00%	225	37.69%	597
Nottoway County	481	78.85%	118	19.34%	10	1.64%	1	0.16%	363	59.51%	610
Orange County	587	74.02%	198	24.97%	8	1.01%	0	0.00%	389	49.05%	793
Page County	804	49.42%	802	49.29%	14	0.86%	7	0.43%	2	0.12%	1,627
Patrick County	723	39.77%	1,092	60.07%	0	0.00%	3	0.17%	-369	-20.30%	1,818
Pittsylvania County	1,471	60.19%	962	39.36%	9	0.37%	2	0.08%	509	20.83%	2,444
Powhatan County	255	63.43%	146	36.32%	0	0.00%	1	0.25%	109	27.11%	402
Prince Edward County	561	82.38%	117	17.18%	3	0.44%	0	0.00%	444	65.20%	681
Prince George County	171	66.02%	88	33.98%	0	0.00%	0	0.00%	83	32.05%	259
Prince William County	738	77.77%	200	21.07%	0	0.00%	0	0.00%	538	56.69%	949
Princess Anne County	403	80.28%	99	19.72%	9	0.95%	2	0.21%	304	60.56%	502
Pulaski County	714	47.44%	780	51.83%	5	0.33%	6	0.40%	-66	-4.39%	1,505
Rappahannock County	433	73.02%	158	26.64%	2	0.34%	0	0.00%	275	46.37%	593
Richmond County	338	62.13%	205	37.68%	0	0.00%	1	0.18%	133	24.45%	544
Roanoke County	732	61.67%	426	35.89%	26	2.19%	3	0.25%	306	25.78%	1,187
Rockbridge County	1,000	54.82%	810	44.41%	10	0.55%	4	0.22%	190	10.42%	1,824
Rockingham County	1,736	50.66%	1,580	46.10%	103	3.01%	8	0.23%	156	4.55%	3,427
Russell County	827	41.10%	1,173	58.30%	8	0.40%	4	0.20%	-346	-17.20%	2,012
Scott County	1,145	39.09%	1,781	60.81%	0	0.00%	3	0.10%	-636	-21.71%	2,929
Shenandoah County	1,294	46.71%	1,449	52.31%	18	0.65%	9	0.32%	-155	-5.60%	2,770
Smyth County	906	40.07%	1,350	59.71%	4	0.18%	1	0.04%	-444	-19.64%	2,261
Southampton County	818	78.88%	206	19.86%	10	0.96%	3	0.29%	612	59.02%	1,037
Spotsylvania County	346	53.89%	282	43.93%	13	2.02%	1	0.16%	64	9.97%	642
Stafford County	406	45.93%	474	53.62%	0	0.00%	4	0.45%	-68	-7.69%	884
Surry County	269	75.99%	82	23.16%	1	0.28%	2	0.56%	187	52.82%	354
Sussex County	412	78.18%	115	21.82%	0	0.00%	0	0.00%	297	56.36%	527
Tazewell County	809	36.38%	1,398	62.86%	7	0.31%	10	0.45%	-589	-26.48%	2,224
Warren County	562	71.68%	209	26.66%	13	1.66%	0	0.00%	353	45.03%	784
Warwick County	101	62.35%	58	35.80%	1	0.62%	2	1.23%	43	26.54%	162
Washington County	1,558	46.91%	1,741	52.42%	18	0.54%	4	0.12%	-183	-5.51%	3,321
Westmoreland County	353	68.68%	161	31.32%	0	0.00%	0	0.00%	192	37.35%	514
Wise County	993	39.19%	1,527	60.26%	4	0.16%	10	0.39%	-534	-21.07%	2,534
Wythe County	950	38.98%	1,487	61.02%	0	0.00%	0	0.00%	-537	-22.04%	2,437
York County	214	75.89%	61	21.63%	6	2.13%	1	0.35%	153	54.26%	282
Alexandria City	1,218	82.69%	247	16.77%	4	0.27%	4	0.27%	971	65.92%	1,473
Bristol City	405	67.61%	187	31.22%	5	0.83%	2	0.33%	218	36.39%	599
Buena Vista City	137	62.56%	80	36.53%	1	0.46%	1	0.46%	57	26.03%	219
Charlottesville City	428	82.63%	82	15.83%	2	0.39%	6	1.16%	346	66.80%	518
Clifton Forge City	402	73.36%	133	24.27%	7	1.28%	6	1.09%	269	49.09%	548
Danville City	963	80.99%	206	17.33%	14	1.18%	6	0.50%	757	63.67%	1,189
Fredericksburg City	285	52.88%	252	46.75%	4	0.74%	0	0.00%	33	6.12%	539
Lynchburg City	962	66.39%	473	32.64%	13	0.90%	1	0.07%	489	33.75%	1,449
Manchester City	363	74.85%	114	23.51%	1	0.21%	7	1.44%	249	51.34%	485
Newport News City	788	59.88%	498	37.84%	5	0.38%	25	1.90%	290	22.04%	1,316
Norfolk City	2,271	68.99%	991	30.10%	20	0.61%	10	0.30%	1,280	38.88%	3,292
Petersburg City	905	81.17%	205	18.39%	4	0.36%	1	0.09%	700	62.78%	1,115
Portsmouth City	1,154	73.50%	407	25.92%	3	0.19%	6	0.38%	747	47.58%	1,570
Radford City	204	57.79%	141	39.94%	4	1.13%	4	1.13%	63	17.85%	353
Richmond City	4,142	77.68%	1,135	21.29%	22	0.41%	33	0.62%	3,007	56.40%	5,332
Roanoke City	1,408	70.19%	593	29.56%	3	0.15%	2	0.10%	815	40.63%	2,006
Staunton City	514	55.93%	347	37.76%	56	6.09%	2	0.22%	167	18.17%	919
Williamsburg City	120	70.59%	48	28.24%	2	1.18%	0	0.00%	72	42.35%	170
Winchester City	449	60.35%	266	35.75%	26	3.49%	3	0.40%	183	24.60%	744
Totals	82,936	60.55%	52,568	38.38%	1,111	0.81%	368	0.27%	30,368	22.17%	136,979

== See also ==
- United States presidential elections in Virginia
