= Clifton Forge, Virginia =

- Town
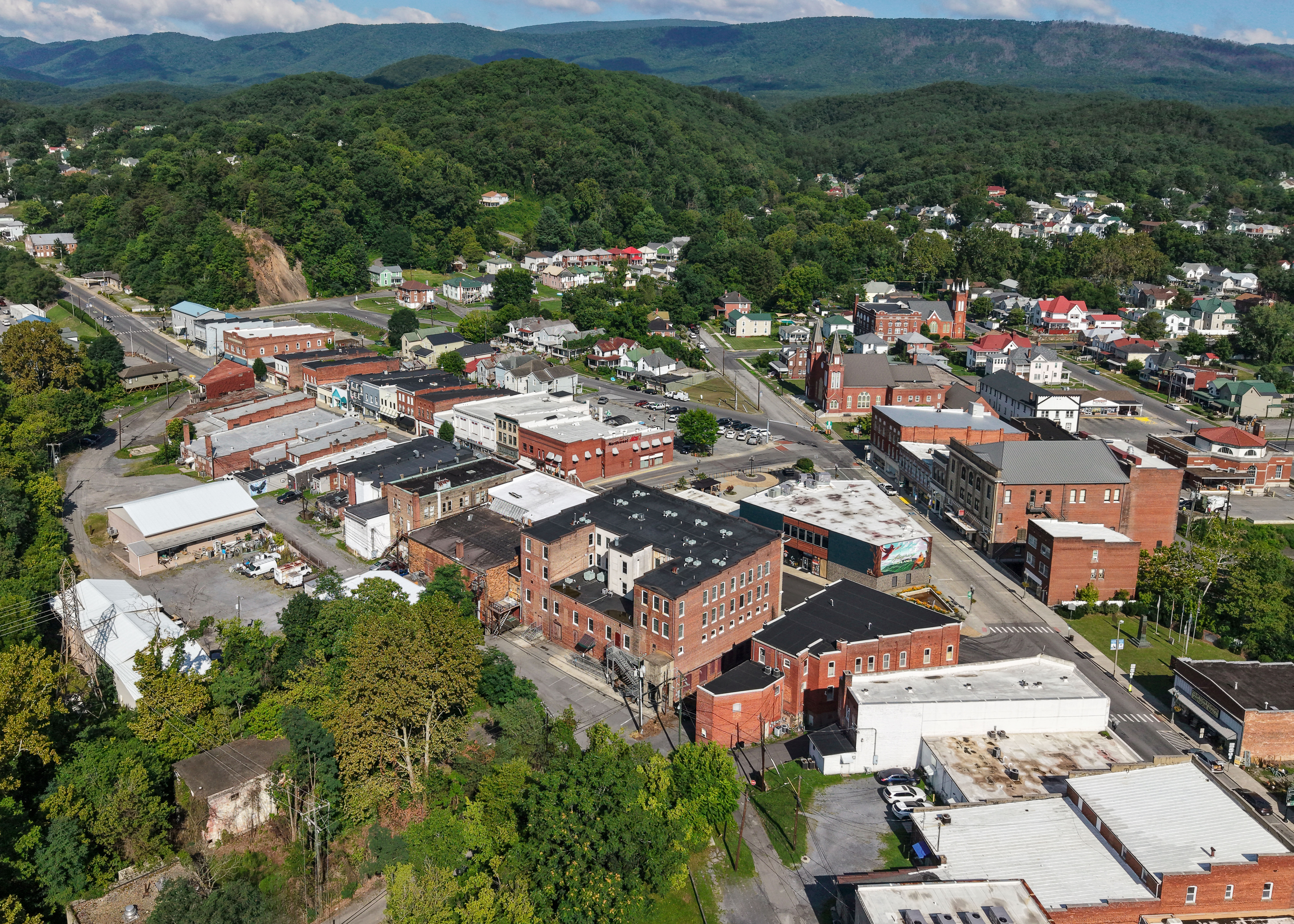
- Downtown Clifton Forge

- Seal

- Location within Shenandoah Valley Location within Virginia Location within the United States
- Coordinates: 37°49′11″N 79°49′25″W
- Country: United States
- State: Virginia
- County: Alleghany
- Settlement: 1700s
- Williamson's Station: February 13, 1861
- Incorporated (town): October 19, 1884
- Incorporated (independent city): March 31, 1906
- Incorporated (town): January 21, 2001
- Named for: The Clifton estate in Lexington

Government
  - Mayor: Jeff Irvine

Area
  - Total: 3.08 sq mi (7.98 km^{2})
  - Land: 3.02 sq mi (7.82 km^{2})
  - Water: 0.058 sq mi (0.15 km^{2})
- Elevation: 1,080 ft (330 m)

Population (2020)
  - Total: 3,555
  - Density: 1,180/sq mi (455/km^{2})
- ZIP Code: 24422
- Area codes: 540 and 826
- FIPS code: 51-17440
- GNIS feature ID: 1492780
- Website: Official website

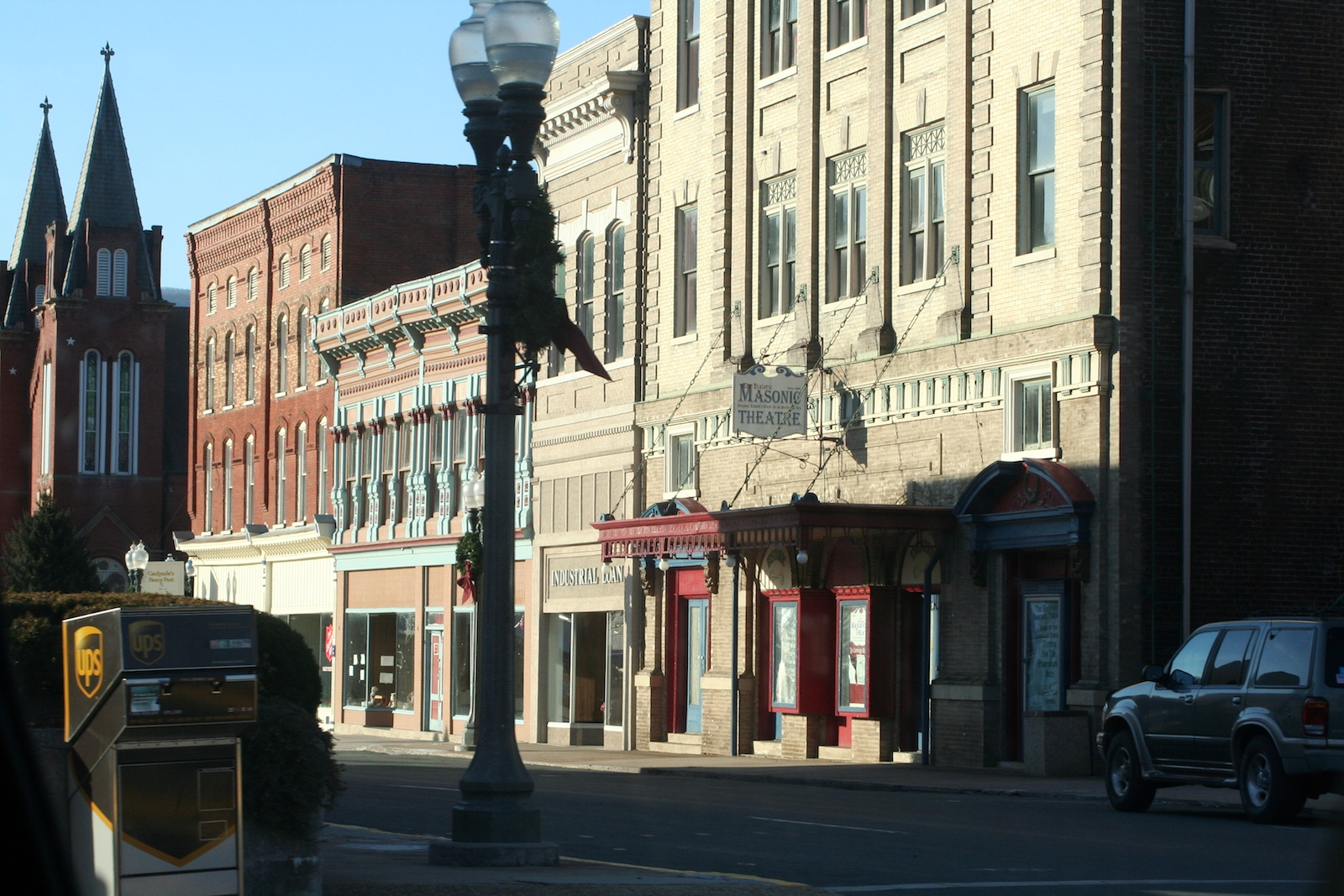
Main Street

Clifton Forge is a town in Alleghany County, Virginia, United States which is part of the greater Roanoke Region. The population was 3,555 at the 2020 census. The Jackson River flows through the town, which as a result was once known as Jackson's River Station.

Clifton Forge was an independent city during the 2000 census. However, in 2001, Clifton Forge gave up its city status and reverted to a town. In previous decades, the railroad was a major employer. Clifton Forge is known for its mountain views and clear streams.

== History ==
The town occupies land that was part of a 1770s land grant from Lord Botetourt to Robert Gallaspy when Botetourt was Governor of Virginia. The land passed into the hands of the Williamson and Smith families by the 1820s after several ownership changes, and a settlement developed along both sides of the Jackson River. The iron industry in the county and the completion of a road over North Mountain, now U.S. 60, caused the settlement to grow. The arrival of the Chesapeake and Ohio (C&O) railroad further grew the town, especially with the establishment of a major steam engine maintenance facility. During the railroad's heyday, it employed over 2,000 people. In the early 1950s, the C&O decided to locate its diesel maintenance facilities in West Virginia, and many railroad jobs were transferred there.

A local forge was named by Mr. William Lyle Alexander of Lexington in honor of his father's Clifton estate there, leading to the name Clifton Forge.

The town was chartered in 1906.

Clifton Forge Commercial Historic District, Clifton Forge Residential Historic District, Clifton Furnace, Jefferson School, and Longdale Furnace Historic District are listed on the National Register of Historic Places.

== Geography ==
Clifton Forge is located at 37°49′11″N 79°49′24″W (37.819801, -79.823584).

According to the United States Census Bureau, the town had a total area of 3.1 square miles (8.0 km^{2}), all land.

Portions of the town were built upon a bridge, elevating the town above a stream.

=== Climate ===
The climate in this area is characterized by hot, humid summers and generally mild to cool winters. According to the Köppen Climate Classification system, Clifton Forge has a humid subtropical climate, abbreviated "Cfa" on climate maps.

== Demographics ==
Historical population
Census	Pop.	Note	%±
1890	1,792		—
1900	3,579		99.7%
1910	5,748		60.6%
1920	6,164		7.2%
1930	6,839		11.0%
1940	6,461		−5.5%
1950	5,795		−10.3%
1960	5,268		−9.1%
1970	5,501		4.4%
1980	5,046		−8.3%
1990	4,679		−7.3%
2000	4,289		−8.3%
2010	3,884		−9.4%
2020	3,555		−8.5%
U.S. Decennial Census

=== 2020 census ===
As of the 2020 census, Clifton Forge had a population of 3,555. The median age was 49.2 years. 18.5% of residents were under the age of 18 and 26.8% of residents were 65 years of age or older. For every 100 females there were 86.8 males, and for every 100 females age 18 and over there were 82.0 males age 18 and over.

99.0% of residents lived in urban areas, while 1.0% lived in rural areas.

There were 1,617 households in Clifton Forge, of which 22.9% had children under the age of 18 living in them. Of all households, 34.3% were married-couple households, 19.6% were households with a male householder and no spouse or partner present, and 38.8% were households with a female householder and no spouse or partner present. About 40.1% of all households were made up of individuals and 21.3% had someone living alone who was 65 years of age or older.

There were 1,988 housing units, of which 18.7% were vacant. The homeowner vacancy rate was 3.7% and the rental vacancy rate was 10.7%.

Racial composition as of the 2020 census
Race	Number	Percent
White	2,916	82.0%
Black or African American	417	11.7%
American Indian and Alaska Native	6	0.2%
Asian	15	0.4%
Native Hawaiian and Other Pacific Islander	2	0.1%
Some other race	20	0.6%
Two or more races	179	5.0%
Hispanic or Latino (of any race)	69	1.9%

=== 2010 census ===
As of the census of 2010, there were 3,884 people, 1,701 households, and 982 families residing in the town. The population density was 1,252.9 people per square mile (483.7 people/km^{2}). There were 2,004 housing units at an average density of 646.5 units per square mile (249.6 units/km^{2}). The racial makeup of the city was 84.4% white, 11.8% black or African American, 0.2% Native American, 0.4% Asian, 0.4% from other races, and 2.8% from two or more races. Hispanic or Latino of any race were 1.7% of the population.

There were 1,701 households, out of which 23.9% had children under the age of 18 living with them, 37.8% were married couples living together, 13.8% had a female householder with no husband present, and 42.3% were non-families. 37.4% of all households were made up of individuals, and 19.1% had someone living alone who was 65 years of age or older. The average household size was 2.18 and the average family size was 2.85.

In the city, the population was spread out, with 21.7% under the age of 18, 6.8% from 18 to 24, 20.4% from 25 to 44, 28.5% from 45 to 64, and 22.6% who were 65 years of age or older. The median age was 45.8 years. For every 100 females, there were 87.2 males. For every 100 females age 18 and over, there were 82.7 males.

The median income for a household in the city was $34,256, and the median income for a family was $53,547. Males had a median income of $38,500 versus $29,630 for females. The per capita income for the city was $20,833. About 14.3% of families and 23.3% of the population were below the poverty line, including 33.4% of those under age 18 and 10.4% of those age 65 or over.

== Government ==
Clifton Forge operates a Mayor–council form of government. Clifton Forge Town Council is composed of five council members who are elected at-large and serve overlapping four year terms. A Mayor and Vice Mayor are selected by the Council out of its membership.

== Education ==
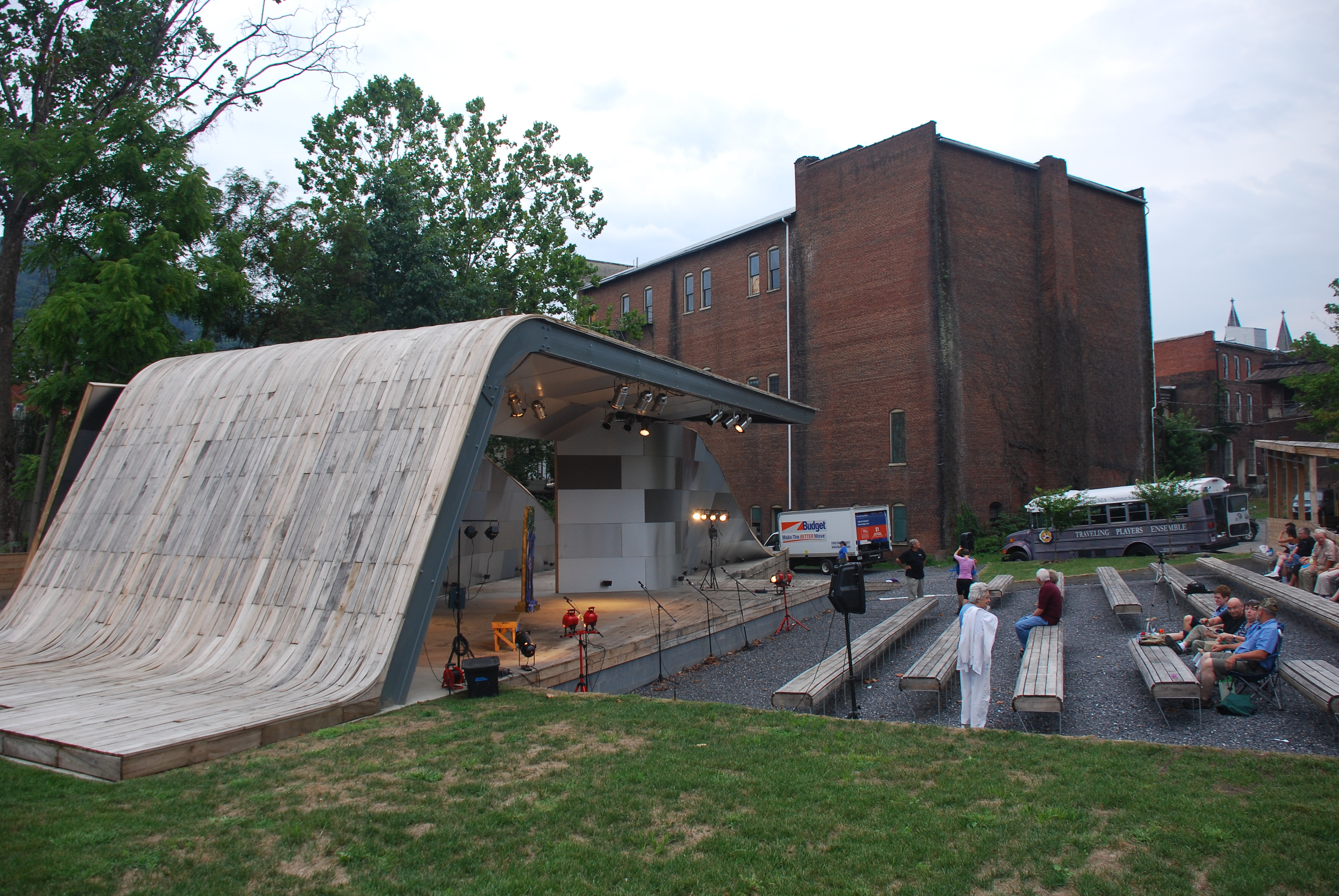
Masonic Amphitheater in Clifton Forge

Clifton Forge is served by Alleghany Highlands Public Schools. Public school students residing in Clifton Forge are zoned to attend Mountain View Elementary School, Clifton Middle School (until 2023), and Alleghany High School.

Mountain Gateway Community College is located west of the town.

== Infrastructure ==
=== Public safety ===
Law enforcement is provided by the Clifton Forge Police Department. Fire protection is provided by the Clifton Forge Fire Department which operates a fire station within the town. Emergency medical services are provided by the Clifton Forge Fire Department and Clifton Forge Rescue Squad.

== Transportation ==
=== Air ===
Ingalls Field, located near Hot Springs, is the closest general aviation airport to the town. The Greenbrier Valley Airport and Roanoke-Blacksburg Regional Airport are the closest airports with commercial service.

=== Roads ===
Clifton Forge is serviced by three major highways, Interstate 64, U.S. Route 60, and U.S. Route 220.

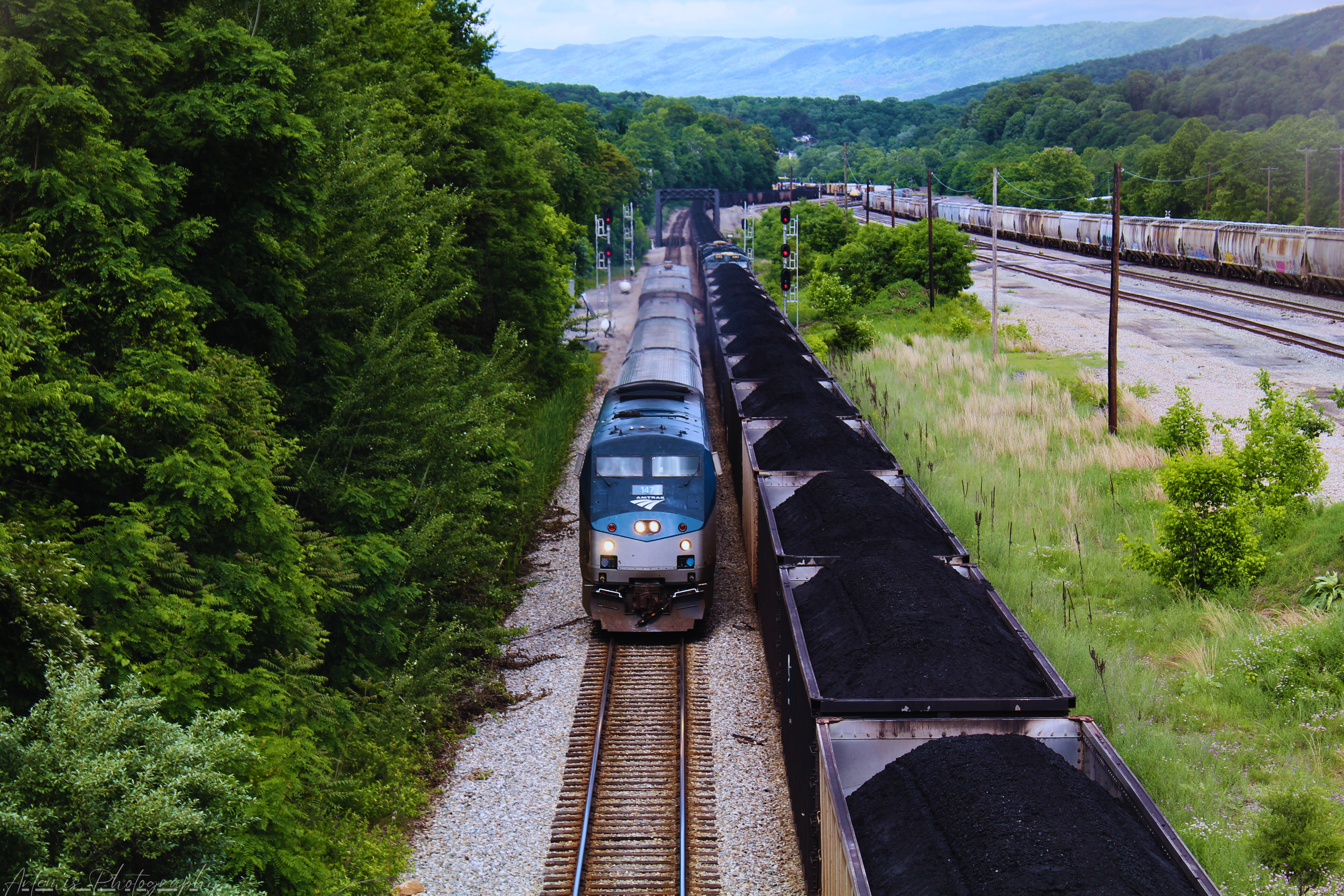
Amtrak's Cardinal P051 going through Lower Clifton Yard.

=== Rail ===
Amtrak, the national passenger rail service, provides service to the Clifton Forge station with the Cardinal route. Clifton Forge also serves a major locomotive fuel facility for CSX Transportation and is home to the Chesapeake & Ohio Historical Society and C&O Railway Heritage Center.

== In popular culture ==
- Mama (2013 horror film) Although the film was produced in Canada, it is set in Clifton Forge.
- The 1985 video for "Driver 8" by R.E.M. was partly filmed in and around the C&O (Chessie System) yards.
- Dopesick (miniseries), based on the book by Beth Macy, was filmed in several different areas of Clifton Forge.

== Notable people ==
=== Natives ===
People born in Clifton Forge:

- Gary Ray Bowles (1962–2019) – serial killer
- Dana Brunetti (born 1973) – media executive
- Bray Cary (born 1948) – politician
- Lisa Disbrow (born 1962) – US Air Force secretary
- Oscar L. Heltzen (1882–1968) – lawyer
- Richard L. Hoffman (1927-2012) – zoologist
- Johnny Humphries (1915–1965) – baseball pitcher
- Trudi Lacey, basketball player and coach
- Nancy Massie Meadows (1912–1986) – first lady of West Virginia
- Nathan Moore (born 1970) – musician known as "Percy Byrd"
- William Overstreet Jr. (1921–2013) – WW2 pilot
- Ira De Augustine Reid (1901–1968) – sociologist
- Denny Riddleberger (born 1945) – baseball player
- Bryan Stinespring (born 1963) – football coach
- James T. Turner (born 1938) – senior judge
- Roger Arliner Young (1899–1964) – scientist

== Politics ==
United States presidential election results for Clifton Forge, Virginia
Year	Republican		Democratic		Third party(ies)	
Year	No.	%	No.	%	No.	%
1908	133	24.27%	402	73.36%	13	2.37%
1912	63	13.91%	293	64.68%	97	21.41%
1916	104	16.99%	455	74.35%	53	8.66%
1920	274	26.52%	727	70.38%	32	3.10%
1924	225	23.22%	447	46.13%	297	30.65%
1928	781	56.92%	591	43.08%	0	0.00%
1932	328	25.81%	917	72.15%	26	2.05%
1936	343	22.13%	1,199	77.35%	8	0.52%
1940	353	22.88%	1,179	76.41%	11	0.71%
1944	415	27.63%	1,082	72.04%	5	0.33%
1948	451	32.10%	818	58.22%	136	9.68%
1952	936	53.46%	811	46.32%	4	0.23%
1956	1,125	61.48%	633	34.59%	72	3.93%
1960	885	53.22%	771	46.36%	7	0.42%
1964	850	40.44%	1,252	59.56%	0	0.00%
1968	925	43.59%	734	34.59%	463	21.82%
1972	1,127	63.17%	575	32.23%	82	4.60%
1976	770	40.68%	993	52.46%	130	6.87%
1980	716	39.23%	1,012	55.45%	97	5.32%
1984	965	51.44%	896	47.76%	15	0.80%
1988	759	43.65%	961	55.26%	19	1.09%
1992	632	33.74%	958	51.15%	283	15.11%
1996	486	29.62%	974	59.35%	181	11.03%
2000	613	40.01%	868	56.66%	51	3.33%

== See also ==
- Former counties, cities, and towns of Virginia
