= Crowell & Moring =

International law firm headquartered in Washington, DC, USA

Crowell & Moring LLP
- Headquarters: Washington, DC, United States
- No. of offices: 12
- No. of attorneys: 600
- No. of employees: 1,000
- Major practice areas: General practice
- Key people: Philip T. Inglima, chair
- Revenue: ▲$517,576,000 (2021)
- Date founded: 1979
- Company type: LLP
- Website: www.crowell.com

Crowell & Moring LLP is an international law firm headquartered in Washington, DC, with offices in New York City, Los Angeles, San Francisco, Orange County, Chicago, Denver, London, Brussels, Doha, and Shanghai. With approximately 600 lawyers, the firm advises multinational corporations on regulatory, litigation, corporate, and investigations matters. As of 2022, Crowell & Moring is ranked among the top 100 law firms in the United States in The American Lawyer's "AmLaw 100" list, based on gross revenue.

== History ==
Crowell & Moring was founded in 1979 by 53 lawyers, most of whom were previously at Jones Day.

The firm has grown steadily since its founding, through acquisitions of practice groups, mergers, and an influx of lateral partners and internal promotions. In 2021, Crowell merged with the Chicago-based intellectual property firm Brinks Gilson & Lione and the New York-based financial services law firm Kibbe & Orbe. In July 2013, Crowell & Moring bolstered its Energy Group with the addition of a six-member team from Dickstein Shapiro. In October 2009, Crowell & Moring opened a San Francisco office by merging with a 28-lawyer litigation team from Folger Levin & Kahn. In August 2009, the firm brought on five partners from Patton Boggs to expand its Environment & Natural Resources Group's work in energy and climate change. In October 2008, Crowell & Moring opened an office in Los Angeles by merging with seven-lawyer white collar defense boutique Lightfoot Vandevelde Sadowsky Crouchley Rutherford & Levine LLP. In 2007, a 10-lawyer financial services group from Buchanan Ingersoll & Rooney joined Crowell & Moring's New York office. These moves were followed by an additional seven intellectual property lawyers in 2008. Crowell & Moring also hired three partners from Morgan & Finnegan, an IP law firm, to open in New York in 2006 and then merged with King Pagano Harrison, a health care and litigation boutique of some 20 attorneys.

== Rankings and awards ==
Crowell & Moring was ranked by The National Law Journal/Legal Times ranking as the “Washington Litigation Department of the Year” in the General Civil Litigation category.

The firm's Regulatory Department includes 100 former government officials who have held positions in the U.S. and abroad. The firm's Antitrust Group is recognized as "highly recommended" or "recommended" in Global Competition Review's (GCR) "GCR 100: The World's Leading Competition Law and Economics Practices," in the Washington, D.C., New York, and California categories.

In 2011, Crowell & Moring partnered with the Association of Corporate Counsel on the ACC's first-ever "Guide to Value-Based Billing," a guide for in-house counsel and their outside law firms on pricing legal services to best suit the client's goals.

The firm has been named to the Financial Times list of “Innovative Lawyers.” In 2016, BTI Consulting Group's Power Rankings report ranked Crowell & Moring 20th in the nation in its list of top law firms recommended by in-house counsel. Crowell & Moring is ranked the #25th best law firm in the United States for firm culture.

The firm has also been recognized for its commitment to diversity as one of the “Top 100 Law Firms for Diversity” by Multicultural Law Magazine and as one of the “Best Law Firms for Women” by Working Mother. Crowell & Moring was the first major D.C.-based law firm in Washington, D.C. to elect a female chair.

== Government contracts ==
Crowell & Moring's Government Contracts Practice is one of the largest in the U.S. and has experience with government agreements and subcontracts (domestic or international) including the bidding and award process; ethics and compliance issues, including suspension and debarment; cost accounting rules and defective pricing; claims; audits and investigations; data rights; cybersecurity and privacy; export controls; security clearances; small business issues; domestic preference requirements; and due diligence and transactional assistance relating to mergers, acquisitions, joint ventures, and strategic alliances. It has been named a “Government Contracts Practice Group of the Year” by Law360 for 12 consecutive years.

Representative matters include a bid protest on behalf of Health Net of the award of a $16 billion Department of Defense (DOD) managed health care contract; securing dismissal of allegations on summary judgment of a False Claims Act case seeking single damages of $1 billion against ACADEMI (formerly Blackwater/Xe Services) under a Department of State security contract in Iraq and Afghanistan; and securing a judgment of over $100 million for SUFI Network Services, Inc. in a breach of contract case against the U.S. Air Force's Non-Appropriated Fund Purchasing Office.

Crowell & Moring represented Blackwater Worldwide in the investigation after a series of deadly shootouts in the Iraqi capital left several Iraqi security agents and civilians dead in May 2007. According to the Legal Times, two other large defense contractors, Erinys Iraq and Kuwait & Gulf Link Transport Co., are among the firm's clients. Crowell & Moring also routinely counsels companies bidding for government contracts and in oversight investigations that sometimes result from those contracts.

== Pro bono and public service ==
Crowell & Moring was named to the National Law Journal's Pro Bono Hot List in 2021.

The firm represents Crosley Green, a man who spent 32 years in prison in Florida, including 19 on death row, after being convicted of the first-degree murder of Chip Flynn, a 22-year-old man in Titusville, Florida in 1990. In 2018, a federal court in Orlando granted Green's petition for habeas corpus. The court found that Green's constitutional rights were violated when Brevard County, Florida, prosecutors withheld key exculpatory evidence of Green's innocence in his trial. On March 14, 2022, the U.S. Court of Appeals for the Eleventh Circuit ruled against Green and reinstated his conviction. The Eleventh Circuit's decision is currently on appeal.

In David v. Signal, the firm worked with the Southern Poverty Law Center to lead litigation for the largest human trafficking case in U.S. history.

The firm secured clemency for pro bono clients in the President Bill Clinton, President Barack Obama, and President George W. Bush administrations. Crowell & Moring partnered with Families Against Mandatory Minimums and was also a participant in the Clemency Project 2014. In that year, the U.S. Department of Justice announced a plan to shorten the sentences of non-violent, low-level offenders who, if sentenced today for the same offense, would have received a substantially lower sentence. Clemency Project 2014 trained attorneys to identify eligible offenders and help them submit a persuasive, compelling clemency petition. To date, Crowell & Moring's efforts to secure clemency for pro bono clients have resulted in nine client sentence commutations.

In 2022, Crowell & Moring was a founding member of the Legal Alliance for Reproductive Rights, a coalition of United States law firms offering free legal services to people seeking and providing abortions in the wake of Dobbs v. Jackson Women's Health Organization, which overruled Roe v. Wade. In 2023, Crowell's summer associate class was 71% women and 39% LGBTQ+, despite women and people identifying as LGBTQ+ making up 51% and 6% of the population, respectively.

== Notable attorneys ==
- Alma Asay, CEO and co-founder of Allegory Law
- Robert Charrow, former General Counsel of the United States Department of Health and Human Services
- Rosemary M. Collyer, former chief judge of the United States Alien Terrorist Removal Court and presiding judge of the United States Foreign Intelligence Surveillance Court
- Donald L. Flexner, co-founder of Boies Schiller Flexner LLP
- Dave Freudenthal, 31st Governor of Wyoming
- Robert Holleyman, former Deputy United States Trade Representative
- Jon Katchen, judge nominee for the United States District Court for the District of Alaska under Donald Trump
- Wilma A. Lewis, chief judge of the United States District Court of the Virgin Islands
- David McFarlane, lawyer and specialist in health care reform law
- Juliet J. McKenna, Associate Judge on the Superior Court of the District of Columbia
- Beth Nolan, first woman to be White House Counsel
- Jonathan Pittman, Associate Judge of the Superior Court of the District of Columbia
- Teresa Stanek Rea, former Acting Under Secretary of Commerce for Intellectual Property
- Ramona Romero, former General Counsel of the United States Department of Agriculture (2011–2014)
- Paul M. Rosen, United States Assistant Secretary of the Treasury for Investment Security nominee
- Chuck Rosenberg, former Acting Administrator of the Drug Enforcement Administration
- Henry S. Ruth Jr., Watergate prosecutor
- Carlos Uriarte, Assistant Attorney General for the Office of Legislative Affairs (OLA)
- Marc Warren, former Deputy Chief Counsel of the Federal Aviation Administration
- Karen Hastie Williams, former chairwoman of Folger Shakespeare Library, first woman and person of color to become partner at Crowell & Moring
