= United States House Judiciary Select Subcommittee on the Weaponization of the Federal Government =

Subcommittee of the US House of Representatives

Select committee
- Defunct United States House of Representatives; 118th Congress

History
- Formed: January 10, 2023
- Disbanded: January 3, 2025

Leadership
- Chair: Jim Jordan (R); Since January 10, 2023
- Ranking Member: Stacey Plaskett (D); Since January 10, 2023

Structure
- Seats: 21
- Political parties: Majority (12): Republican (12); Minority (9): Democratic (9)

Jurisdiction
- Purpose: To investigate the executive branch's authority to investigate U.S. citizens and gather information, as well as its ability to obtain information from or shared with the private sector.
- Senate counterpart: None

The United States House Judiciary Select Subcommittee on the Weaponization of the Federal Government was a select subcommittee of the House Judiciary Committee created by the House on January 10, 2023. It dissolved at the beginning of the new congressional session on January 3, 2025. Established to investigate alleged abuses of federal authority, including collusion between federal agencies and private sector entities to suppress conservative viewpoints, the committee had broad authority to subpoena law enforcement and national security agencies, including with regard to ongoing criminal investigations.

The subcommittee was chaired by Representative Jim Jordan, who also chaired the Judiciary Committee.

== Background and creation ==
After his presidency, Trump's Mar-a-Lago residence was searched by the FBI as part of an investigation into presidential documents he had removed from the White House but declined to return under subpoena. The Republican Party widely criticized both the search and the investigation, with eventual House speaker Kevin McCarthy tweeting on August 9, 2022, "When Republicans take back the House, we will conduct immediate oversight of this department, follow the facts, and leave no stone unturned." As part of his concessions during his eventual, after 15 ballots, successful bid to become Speaker of the 118th Congress, McCarthy promised members of the Republican Freedom Caucus to create a subcommittee to investigate actions taken by federal agencies and the Biden administration. Representative Dan Bishop made it a key concession McCarthy would need to make in exchange for his vote during the speaker elections.

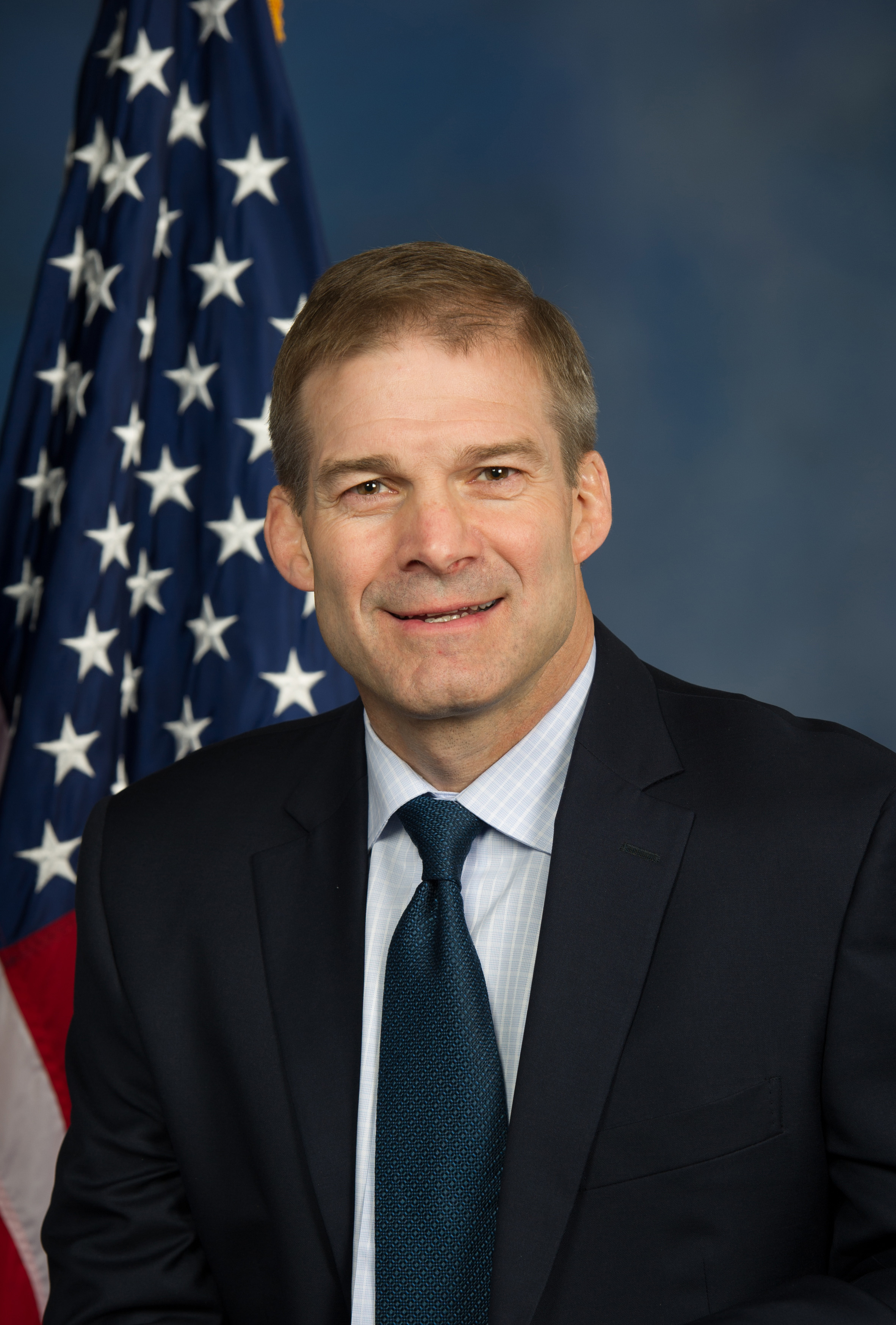
Representative Jim Jordan (R-OH), chair of the Select Subcommittee

Beginning in the Trump presidency, many Republicans have raised concerns regarding perceived censorship of conservative views on Big Tech platforms. They have cited the Hunter Biden laptop controversy as a major example, and the Twitter Files as purported evidence. In the months leading up to the 2022 congressional elections, Jordan made multiple appearances on Fox News and Newsmax, accusing content moderation systems at Big Tech companies to be biased and praised the Twitter Files, a series of documents detailing alleged collusion between Twitter and the federal government. In December 2022, prior to Republicans taking control of the House, Jordan wrote a letter to five of the largest tech companies, requesting they hand over correspondence between the Biden administration and their respective companies. Jordan subpoenaed the companies in February 2023.

In a 221–211 vote on January 10, 2023, the House passed House Resolution 12, "Establishing a Select Subcommittee on the Weaponization of the Federal Government as a select investigative subcommittee of the Committee on the Judiciary". The subcommittee will have the power to issue subpoenas and access to sensitive national security information available to the House Intelligence Committee.

== Members, 118th Congress ==
| Majority | Minority |
|---|---|
| Jim Jordan, Ohio, Chair; Darrell Issa, California; Thomas Massie, Kentucky; Chris Stewart, Utah; Elise Stefanik, New York; Matt Gaetz, Florida; Kelly Armstrong, North Dakota; Dan Bishop, North Carolina; Kat Cammack, Florida; Harriet Hageman, Wyoming; Warren Davidson, Ohio; Russell Fry, South Carolina | Stacey Plaskett, Virgin Islands, Ranking Member; Stephen Lynch, Massachusetts; Linda Sánchez, California; Debbie Wasserman Schultz, Florida; Gerry Connolly, Virginia; John Garamendi, California; Sylvia Garcia, Texas; Dan Goldman, New York; Jasmine Crockett, Texas |

== Reactions ==
Republicans have compared the Subcommittee to the 1975 Church Committee formed by Democrats to investigate the abuse of civil liberties by American intelligence agencies.

Members of the Democratic caucus have referred to it as the "tin foil hat committee". Jerry Nadler, the ranking member of the Judiciary Committee, said the subcommittee is "fueled by conspiracy theories and slated to be run by the most extreme members of the MAGA caucus," unlike the Church Committee which he said was "a serious and bipartisan attempt to reform the conduct of the intelligence community, based on hard and verifiable evidence."

Progressive "Squad" House members called the committee the "Insurrection Protection Committee" and "a fascist power grab to evade accountability".

Democratic representative Jamie Raskin said in response to the formation of the subcommittee that the Republicans are "at risk of congressional overreach" and Democrats in general are concerned about the wide mandate given to the subcommittee.

== Developments ==
Chairman Jordan sent letters to multiple Biden administration officials from Department of Justice (DOJ) and Department of Education, including Attorney General Merrick Garland and Federal Bureau of Investigation (FBI) director Christopher Wray on January 17, 2023, that before Republicans took control of the House, they had asked the DOJ and FBI for information and documents but had not received them, but "this stonewalling must stop" now that Republicans control committees. The subcommittee was authorized to subpoena materials related to ongoing criminal investigations. In response to Jordan's letter three days later, the DOJ wrote "longstanding Department policy prevents us from confirming or denying the existence of pending investigations in response to congressional requests or providing non-public information about our investigations." The DOJ cited a 1982 directive by President Ronald Reagan that the DOJ would try to cooperate with congressional oversight requests but reserved the right of executive privilege and would invoke it "only in the most compelling circumstances." The DOJ wrote it was prepared to meet with the committee to discuss the matter.

Eschewing a meeting, Jordan issued the subcommittee's first subpoenas on February 3, to the Justice Department, FBI and Department of Education. The subpoenas demanded documents related to a 2021 directive issued by the Justice Department to step up coordination with local officials regarding a spate of aggressive and threatening behavior by parents at some school board meetings. A false narrative had developed among many Republicans that attorney general Merrick Garland had characterized the parents as "domestic terrorists" in the directive. That characterization had come from the National School Boards Association, though it did not ask the Biden administration to adopt it.

On February 8, Carlos Uriarte, Assistant Attorney General for Legislative Affairs, wrote to Jordan, "You have not yet responded to our offer. We have offered to engage with the Committee and provide information voluntarily, so a subpoena is premature."

=== First hearing ===
The committee's first public hearing was held on February 9, 2023. Witnesses included Republican senators Ron Johnson and Chuck Grassley; former Democratic congresswoman Tulsi Gabbard; former FBI agents Thomas Baker and Nicole Parker; George Washington University law professor, and Fox News contributor Jonathan Turley; and Elliot Williams, a CNN legal analyst and Obama administration deputy assistant attorney general.

Democratic congressman Jamie Raskin was also invited to testify. He remarked that "millions of Americans already fear that weaponization is the right name for this special subcommittee — not because weaponization of the government is its target but because weaponization of the government is its purpose."

Jordan said in his opening statement that the committee would investigate concerns among Americans that multiple government agencies and Big Tech were acting to "suppress information and censor Americans."

In her opening remarks, Democratic ranking member Stacey Plaskett said she was "deeply concerned about the use of this select subcommittee as a place to settle scores, showcase conspiracy theories and advance an extreme agenda that risks undermining Americans' faith in our democracy." She added that Democrats would resist the subcommittee's authorization to examine ongoing criminal investigations that might "derail ongoing legitimate investigations into President Trump or any other President and others within his orbit."

=== Controversy around whistleblowers ===
For months prior to creation of the subcommittee, Jordan had found that "dozens" of whistleblowers had contacted his office about alleged government abuses. Three whistleblowers provided private testimony prior the subcommittee being formed. In March 2023, subcommittee Democrats released a 316-page report asserting the interviewed men did not meet the definition of a whistleblower and had engaged in partisan conduct that called their credibility into question, writing "each endorses an alarming series of conspiracy theories related to the Jan. 6 Capitol attack, the Covid vaccine, and the validity of the 2020 election." According to the report, the witnesses provided little firsthand knowledge of wrongdoing or violation of law. The report said they have ties to far-right Republican operatives and former Trump administration officials. Two of the men testified they received financial support from Trump loyalist Kash Patel who following Trump's election in 2024 was appointed as Director of the Federal Bureau of Investigation, and one said Patel arranged for him to get a new job at a conservative think tank. Jordan's spokesman alleged Democrats were misrepresenting the testimony in an effort to smear the witnesses. Democrats suggested the men were being characterized as "whistleblowers" to shield them from public scrutiny and asked Jordan to call them for public testimony.

=== Second hearing ===
Twitter Files authors Matt Taibbi and Michael Shellenberger testified before the committee on March 9, 2023. Both Taibbi and Schellenberger shared documents highlighting a range of concerns, from the White House pushing Twitter to censor Harvard epidemiologist Martin Kulldorf, to FBI officials urging suppression of the Hunter Biden laptop story ahead of the 2020 presidential election.

=== Third hearing ===
The subcommittee heard testimony from three self-proclaimed FBI whistleblowers on May 18, 2023. They had previously complained about ways the bureau had allegedly discriminated against conservatives. Two of the three witnesses, and a third man, had their security clearances revoked days before the hearing for participating in the January 6 attack, or for later expressing views about it that placed into question their "allegiance to the United States," according to the bureau. The three men had been suspended; NBC News reported in June that one of the men had been suspended because FBI internal investigators concluded he had leaked sensitive investigative information to the right-wing Project Veritas. Two of the witnesses acknowledged receiving cash payments from Trump loyalist Kash Patel.

=== Final report ===
The subcommittee released a 17,019-page final report on December 20, 2024. The subcommittee's report concluded that the executive branch had "weaponized" its authority to suppress online speech of American citizens.

The committee subpoenaed non-public and confidential records from both government agencies, including the Federal Bureau of Investigation (FBI), the Cybersecurity and Infrastructure Security Agency (CISA), the State Department's Global Engagement Center (GEC), the White House; and social platforms, including Facebook, Google, Twitter, and Amazon. The subcommittee claimed these records demonstrate that federal executive agencies exerted pressure on social media companies to alter their content moderation policies. The report alleged that the White House leveraged its influence over other policy areas of interest to social media companies in order to coerce compliance. This coercion resulted in censorship of online content that did not otherwise violate social platform policies. The report concluded this coordination created a "chilling effect" on online speech for posts about COVID-19 vaccination, the Hunter Biden laptop controversy, Russian interference in the 2016 United States elections and the 2020 United States presidential election.

The subcommittee argued for Congressional oversight and stated that executive agencies with foreign-focused mandates eventually turned their surveillance capabilities toward domestic political speech. According to the report, a systematic process, based on AI capabilities via third-party development from the Stanford Internet Observatory that automatically flags content, enabled agencies to send "specific censorship recommendations to social media companies to remove or demote thousands of Americans’ online posts". The investigation argued that internal documents showed federal officials and researchers understood these moderation efforts amounted to censorship. The subcommittee claimed this systematic, coordinated mechanism created a "censorship-industrial complex" to suppress political speech.

The bulk of the report consisted of interview and deposition transcripts. Chairman Jordan characterized the subcommittee's work as a success.
