= Antonio Arocho =

Puerto Rican Attorney and NonProfit Executive

Antonio Arocho (born Hatillo, Puerto Rico), more commonly known as Tony Arocho, is an attorney and former chief operating officer of the Hispanic National Bar Association (2006–2008). He is the founder and principal attorney of the Arocho Law Office. He is a member of the District of Columbia and U.S. Virgin Islands bars. He is also admitted to practice before the U.S. Court of International Trade, and United States Court of Appeals for the Third Circuit.

== Education ==
Arocho has degrees from Seton Hall University School of Law (Juris Doctor) and Rider College (now Rider University) (Bachelor of Science in Commerce in Business Administration). While in high school he took college courses at Mercer County Community College.

As a freshman at Rider College, he was instrumental in resurrecting the La Tropicana Club, the predecessor to the Latin American Student Organization (LASO), and in transforming the club into a Latino/Hispanic student union organization. La Tropicana Club was founded as a social club at Rider College in the 1930s by Cuban and Puerto Rican students who named their club after a famous venue in Havana, Cuba. While serving as President of the La Tropicana Club, Latino students at Rider College began to serve as tutors for Latino students at Trenton High School. Also he was instrumental in increasing the recruitment and retention of Latino/Hispanic students. During his junior year, Arocho presented a proposal to the Rider College president and administration for a minor program in Hispanic/Latino studies. He also organized voter registration drives focusing primarily on registering poor citizens in Trenton, New Jersey. In his senior year, he unsuccessfully attempted to create a statewide association of Hispanic/Latino college organizations.[add citations] He was elected as Senator in the Rider College Student Government Association. While in law school he served as student attorney for the Essex-Newark Legal Services legal clinic program.

== Public service ==
Arocho served as an Assistant U.S. Virgin Islands Attorney General, Director of Labor Relations for the U.S. Virgin Islands, and as a special assistant to the Delegate to U.S. House of Representatives from the Virgin Islands. He has substantial experience with litigation in federal and local courts. He also served as a hearing officer with the District of Columbia Public Service Commission. As an Assistant U.S. Virgin Islands Attorney General he argued several high-profile cases on behalf of the Government of the U.S. Virgin Islands in federal and territorial courts. One of these cases is the seminal right-to-die case, Fredella v. Farrelly (a 1993 Territorial Court of the U.S. Virgin Islands decision), which set forth the medical standards that requires two EEG tests be performed within a 24-hour period to confirm the absence of brain activity and that neurological tests be performed by two neurologists. See, e.g., 28 V.I. 90 (Territorial Court of the Virgin Islands, 1993).

While a student at Rider College, he was appointed by the Mercer County Board of Freeholders to serve on the Mercer County Office of Training & Employment Services Advisory Board. On September 12, 2000, he was appointed by the Honorable Parris N. Glendening, Governor of the State of Maryland, to serve as a Commissioner on the Governor's Commission of Hispanic Affairs the remainder of a term of three years from January 1, 2000. He served as an officer in the Maryland state reserve of the Maryland Military Department that is called Maryland Defense Force.

== Nonprofit Sector ==
Arocho's experience includes working with many nonprofit organizations as counsel, board member, and part of the management team. He served as interim executive director of the Hispanic National Bar Association from 2012 to 2013 and served as executive director from 2006 to 2008 . From 2008 to 2009, upon the request of Nilda I. Ruiz, president and C.E.O. of Asociacion Puertorriquenos en Marcha, Inc.(APM), he provided technical and managerial assistance to APM, including serving as special assistance to the president, interim vice-president for health and human services and as interim vice-president for human service programs. Earlier efforts included implementing membership objectives and advocacy efforts as a vice-president at the National Community Reinvestment Coalition . He provided technical assistance to Hispanic community-based organizations and community development corporations around the nation while at the National Council of La Raza.. He served as the Pennsylvania Association of Latino Organizations, Inc.'s (PALO) first chief operating officer. Arocho has successfully raised funds for diverse causes from private sources, private foundations, individuals, and government grants. In addition, he has provided legal representation to migrant and seasonal farmworkers, the poorest group of working people in the United States. During his college years he served on the executive boards of the Puerto Rican Congress of New Jersey and Puerto Rican Action Committee of Mercer County. He began working with nonprofits while in high school (Summer 1975) where he created and supervised a Hispanic Needs Assessment Survey for the Hightstown-East Windsor Community Action Service Center.

== Native American/Amerindian/Indigenous Involvement ==
In the 1990s, Arocho served as an advisor to the Hon. Hilary Frederik who was the Chief of the Carib Territory of the Carib people (Kalinago) on the island of Dominica. He arranged several official visits and presentations by Chief Frederick to the mainland United States and U.S. Virgin Islands. Also Arocho has provided advice to several unrecognized and state recognized tribes in the United States.

== Philanthropy ==
Arocho donated his extensive Native American book collection to the Nanticoke Indian Museum & Library of the Nanticoke Indian Association in Delaware.

In addition, in honor of his parents, Arocho made a generous gift of over one hundred philosophy, religious and theological books and material to the new library of Philadelphia's Esperanza College of Eastern University (United States).

== Archives ==
Antonio Arocho's archives, materials and photographs are housed in the Puerto Rican Community Archives, New Jersey Hispanic and Research Information Center of the Newark Public Library.

== Publications ==
En rest af dansk ret bliver stadig brut pa de Dansk-vestindiske Oer/Vol 6 Juristen (1998)-Danish Economist & Lawyer Journal. The Danish National Archives web page on law in the Virgin Islands cited this article.

Conciliation of Civil Disputes in the Territorial Court of the USVI: A Vestige of Danish Jurisprudence in the Caribbean-

== Recognitions & Community Activities ==
Joint Legislative Resolution of NJ Senate and Legislature (July 1999) recognized Antonio Arocho's contributions to farmworkers in New Jersey, Camden Regional Legal Services, and community.

Arocho donated his extensive Native American book collection to the Nanticoke Indian Museum & Library of the Nanticoke Indian Tribe in Delaware.

Antonio Arocho New HNBA Executive Director </ref

Antonio Arocho, Vice-President, National Community Reinvestment Coalition

D.C. Attorney donates American Indian book collection
