= Charles Flynn =

Charles Flynn may refer to:

- Charles L. Flynn Jr., president of the College of Mount Saint Vincent
- Charles Flynn (trade unionist) (1882–1957), British trade unionist and politician
- Charles A. Flynn, United States Army general
- Charles Flynn (1966–1989), American man killed in Brevard County, Florida, see murder of Charles Flynn
- Charlie Flynn (born 1993), amateur boxer from Scotland
