= Robert Raben =

American lawyer

Rob Raben

United States Assistant Attorney General for the Office of Legislative Affairs
- In office October 7, 1999 – January 20, 2001
- President: Bill Clinton
- Preceded by: Andrew Fois
- Succeeded by: Daniel Bryant

Personal details
- Born: November 11, 1963 (age 62) Miami Beach, Florida, U.S.
- Party: Democratic
- Education: University of Pennsylvania (BS); New York University (JD)

Robert Raben (* November 11, 1963, in Miami Beach, Florida) is the founder and president of the Washington, D.C.–based lobbying and consulting firm The Raben Group, and was Assistant Attorney General at the Department of Justice under former President Bill Clinton. Raben is known as a bipartisan player for progressive change in Washington.

== Early life, education, and career ==
Raben holds a degree from the Wharton School of the University of Pennsylvania and the New York University School of Law. Shortly after law school, Raben clerked for the Supreme Court of Mississippi and taught Law at the University of Miami before he joined the firm Arnold & Porter as an associate specializing in international trade, federal lobbying, and white-collar criminal defence.

Raben started his career on Capitol Hill as counsel for Congressman Barney Frank (D-MA). He served in this capacity for seven years, advising him on civil rights policy and Judiciary committee issues. His committee work for Rep. Frank eventually led him to his next role as Democratic counsel for the House Judiciary Committee on the Subcommittee on Courts, the Internet, and Intellectual Property, and for the Subcommittee on the Constitution. In conjunction with his service on the Hill, Raben taught as a professor at the Georgetown University Law Center.

In 1999, he was appointed Principal Deputy Assistant Attorney General, and subsequently Assistant Attorney General under President Bill Clinton on October 7. Raben oversaw Attorney General Janet Reno's legislative initiatives and handled congressional oversight of the Department. He received a unanimous confirmation vote for this position along with an endorsement from the Senate Judiciary Committee's Republican subcommittee chairs. He acted as chief lobbyist and strategist on intellectual property, federalism, tort reform, and cybercrime issues.

== The Raben Group, Since 2001 ==
In 2001, Raben formed The Raben Group, a Washington, D.C.–based lobbying, consulting, and public affairs firm founded specializing in issues of law and public policy. The firm maintains offices in Washington, D.C., New York City and Los Angeles. Its lobbying income in 2014 was about $4.5M and it was included in The Hill's top lobbyists in 2014.

Notable issues or clients have included:

- 2005 Free Speech Coalition, a pornography industry organization, working on issues of free speech and government regulation.
- 2009: Gun control efforts led by Michael Bloomberg
- 2013: Iraqi Refugee Assistance Project, to obtain visas for Afghans and Iraqis "who were American interpreters, victims of sexual abuse, torture and members of the LGBT community facing 'life and death' situations."
- 2013 American Task Force Argentina, to assist the government of Argentina fighting effort of debt collectors
- 2014 LGBT issues
- 2015 Islamic Relief Worldwide, to educate Washington about its programming Israel has banned Islamic Relief, accusing it of funding Hamas.

== Boards and Associations ==
Since 1995, Raben has chaired both the Hispanic National Bar Association's (HNBA) D.C. Foundation and Endorsement Committee. Additionally, he sits on the boards of the Iraqi Refugee Assistance Project, the Joint Center for Political and Economic Studies, and the Mid-Atlantic Innocence Project.

Raben is also known for hosting salon discussions at his house with journalists and politicos. He frequently hosts salon discussions at his home with journalists, politicians, activists, and executives.
