= Ronald Weich =

American attorney and academic

Dean of Seton Hall University School of Law
- Incumbent
- Assumed office July 2024
- Preceded by: Kathleen Boozang

United States Assistant Attorney General for the Office of Legislative Affairs
- In office April 29, 2009 – April 25, 2012
- President: Barack Obama
- Preceded by: Richard Hertling (acting)
- Succeeded by: Judith C. Appelbaum

Personal details
- Education: Columbia University (BA); Yale University (JD)

Ronald Weich is an American professor of law who currently serves as dean of Seton Hall University School of Law. Prior to becoming dean of Seton Hall Law School Weich served as dean of the University of Baltimore School of Law for 12 years. He served as United States Assistant Attorney General for the Office of Legislative Affairs from 2009 to 2012.

== Biography ==
Weich graduated from Columbia University summa cum laude in 1980 and received his J.D. from Yale Law School in 1983. He spent his junior year studying abroad at the London School of Economics.

He began his legal career as an assistant district attorney in Manhattan. In 1987, he joined the staff of the U.S. Sentencing Commission serving as a legislative liaison. From 1990 to 1997, Weich served as general counsel to the Senate Committee on Labor and Human Resources and chief counsel to Senator Ted Kennedy on the Senate Judiciary Committee.

From 1997 to 2004, he was a lawyer at the Washington D.C. law firm Zuckerman Spaeder. From 2005 to 2007, he served as chief counsel to Senator Harry Reid. In March 2009, he was nominated to be the United States Assistant Attorney General for the Office of Legislative Affairs and was confirmed in April 2009. Under his leadership, the office has worked to advance legislations such as the Violence Against Women Reauthorization Act of 2012, the FISA Amendments Extension Act and the Nuclear Terrorism Conventions Implementation Act.

In June 2012, Weich announced his departure from the United States Department of Justice to join the University of Baltimore School of Law as its new dean.
