= Mark McNulty (disambiguation) =

Mark or Marc McNulty may refer to:

- Mark McNulty (born 1953), Rhodesian-Irish golfer
- Marc McNulty (born 1992), Scottish footballer
- Mark McNulty (politician) (born 1944), American politician
- Mark McNulty (footballer) (born 1980), Irish footballer
