= Patrick E. Hobbs =

American legal academic

- Born: March 29, 1960 (age 66); Orange, New Jersey, U.S.

Academic background
- Education: Seton Hall University (BA); University of North Carolina at Chapel Hill (JD); New York University (LLM)

Academic work
- Discipline: Law
- Sub-discipline: Tax law Financial law
- Institutions: Seton Hall University; Rutgers University

Patrick E. Hobbs (born March 29, 1960) is an American attorney, academic administrator, and professor who previously served as the athletic director at Rutgers University.

== Early life and education ==
Hobbs was born March 29, 1960, in Orange, New Jersey. He received Bachelor of Arts degree, magna cum laude, from Seton Hall University in 1982, a Juris Doctor from the University of North Carolina School of Law in 1985, and an L.L.M. from New York University School of Law in 1988.

== Career ==
Hobbs was named the dean of the Seton Hall University School of Law in 1999. He joined the Law School faculty in 1990 and served as associate dean of finance from 1996 to 1999. He is an elected fellow of the American Bar Association and is a former co-chair of the American Bar Association Development Committee.

In 2004, Hobbs served as Chair of the Newark, New Jersey Mayor's Blue-Ribbon Commission on the Downtown Core Redevelopment, which led the way for the construction of the Prudential Center entertainment arena. From 2009 to 2011, Hobbs served as interim leader of Seton Hall University's Athletics Department. From 2004 to 2014 Hobbs, served on the New Jersey State Commission of Investigation; he chaired the commission beginning in 2010. He stepped down as chair in 2014 after Governor Christopher Christie appointed him to a newly-created role, ombudsman for the governor's office.

On November 29, 2015, Rutgers University President Robert L. Barchi named Hobbs as athletic director.

On August 16, 2024, Hobbs stepped down as AD due to health concerns. A few days later, it was widely reported that Hobbs was under investigation for an "inappropriate, consensual relationship", and this was confirmed by NJ Governor Phil Murphy.
