= Robert Holleyman =

American lawyer

Robert W. Holleyman II
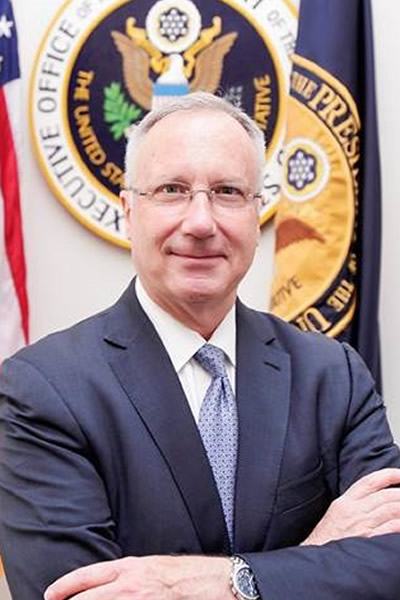

Deputy United States Trade Representative
- In office September 2014 – January 20, 2017
- President: Barack Obama
- Preceded by: Office Established
- Succeeded by: Jeffrey Gerrish/Dennis Shea

Personal details
- Born: Robert Walker Holleyman II; February 4, 1955 (age 71) New Orleans, Louisiana, U.S.
- Party: Democratic
- Education: Trinity University; Louisiana State University

Robert Walker Holleyman II (born February 4, 1955) served as the United States Deputy Trade Representative, with the rank of ambassador, in the Office of the United States Trade Representative in September, 2014 to January 2017. Previously he was the President & CEO of the Business Software Alliance (BSA), the trade consortium which represents the interests of major software houses globally.

In July 2017, Holleyman joined C&M International LLC, a division of Crowell & Moring, as president and CEO. He was also made partner in the firm's International Trade Group.

== Biography ==
Holleyman obtained his Bachelor of Arts degree in political science at Trinity University in San Antonio, Texas, and his Juris Doctor at Louisiana State University Law Center in Baton Rouge, Louisiana.

He was judicial clerk for U.S. District Judge Jack M. Gordon in New Orleans, Louisiana and was also an attorney with Houston, Texas-based law firm Margraves, Kennerly & Schueler.

Holleyman was legislative director and assistant to former U.S. Senator Russell B. Long (D-LA) between 1982 and 1986, and senior counsel for the United States Senate Committee on Commerce, Science and Transportation from 1987 to 1990.

Holleyman joined the BSA as its chief executive officer in 1990, and continued in that capacity until 2013.

== Deputy United States Trade Representative ==
On February 26, 2014, President Barack Obama announced his intent to nominate Holleyman to be the next Deputy United States Trade Representative.

He was confirmed by voice vote to his position on September 18, 2014. Ambassador Holleyman led USTR's newly created Digital Trade Working Group and USTR's digital trade priorities known as the 'Digital 2 Dozen'. His responsibilities included US trade and investment relations with Asia, as well as trade negotiations and policy coordination in the areas of services, investment, innovation and intellectual property.

On June 9, 2015, he joined several other gay diplomats in a statement supporting international trade agreements as a means of enhancing LGBT rights worldwide.

== Other ==
Holleyman has been called up as expert witness on issues affecting the software industry including copyright, trade, and emerging policy concerns resulting from increasing use of the Internet. He was named as one of its "Twenty to Watch" in the computer software industry by Computer Reseller News. He was a regular contributor on the syndicated radio program, "On Computers", and frequently appears on National Public Radio, all the leading networks, public and cable television news programs.

In July 2003, Holleyman was named one of the 50 most influential people in the intellectual property world by the international Managing Intellectual Property magazine.

In addition, Holleyman is the founding president of the Alliance Against CD-ROM Theft (AACT) -- an organization combating the production and distribution of illegal CD-ROMs throughout Asia.

== See also ==
- Canadian Alliance Against Software Theft
