= Paul M. Rosen =

American attorney

Paul Rosen
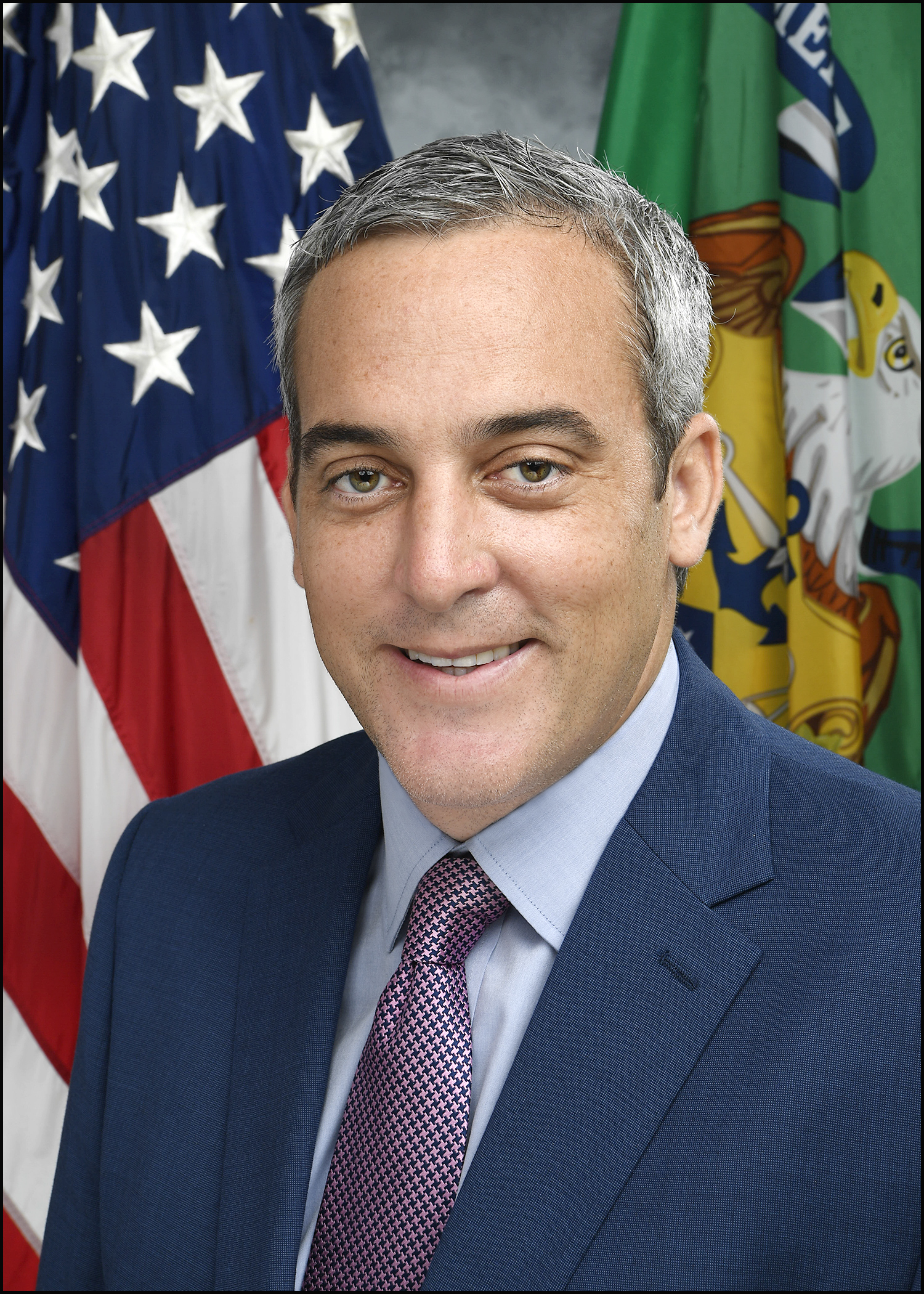
- Official portrait, 2022

United States Assistant Secretary of the Treasury for Investment Security
- In office August 5, 2022 – December 2024
- President: Joe Biden
- Secretary: Janet Yellen
- Under Secretary: Jay Shambaugh
- Preceded by: Thomas P. Feddo
- Succeeded by: Chris Pilkerton

Personal details
- Spouse: Casey Hernandez (m. 2018)
- Education: University of Colorado; Boulder (BA); University of Southern California (JD)

Paul Michael Rosen is an American attorney. He is currently a partner at Latham & Watkins. He served as Assistant Secretary of the Treasury for Investment Security from 2022 to 2024 in the Biden administration.

== Education ==
Rosen earned a Bachelor of Arts degree from the University of Colorado Boulder and a Juris Doctor from the USC Gould School of Law.

== Career ==
=== Legal career ===
In 2005 and 2006, Rosen served as a law clerk for Judge Gary Allen Feess. From 2006 to 2009, he served as counsel to then-Senator Joe Biden during Biden's tenure as chair of the United States Senate Committee on the Judiciary. In 2010 and 2011, Rosen served as special assistant United States attorney for the Eastern District of Virginia. Rosen joined the United States Department of Justice Criminal Division in 2009, serving as counsel to the assistant attorney general until 2011 and trial attorney in the Securities and Financial Fraud Unit. In 2013 and 2014, Rosen served as chief of staff of U.S. Immigration and Customs Enforcement. He then joined the United States Department of Homeland Security, serving as deputy chief of staff and later chief of staff for then-Secretary Jeh Johnson. From 2017 to 2019, Rosen was a senior fellow at the Harvard Kennedy School. He also worked as an agency review team member of the Biden-Harris Transition Team. Since 2017, he has been a partner at Crowell & Moring.

=== U.S. Department of the Treasury ===
On March 8, 2022, President Joe Biden nominated Rosen to be an Assistant Secretary of the Treasury for Investment Security. Hearings were held before the Senate Banking Committee on April 6, 2022. The committee favorably reported the nomination to the Senate floor on May 4, 2022. The entire Senate confirmed Rosen via voice vote on May 24, 2022.

On May 31, 2023, Rosen testified to the Senate Banking Committee on the U.S. economic security approach to China.

== Personal life ==
In 2018, Rosen married Casey Hernandez, the vice president for content strategy at Herbalife Nutrition.
