= Stephen Boyd (attorney) =

American lawyer (born 1979)

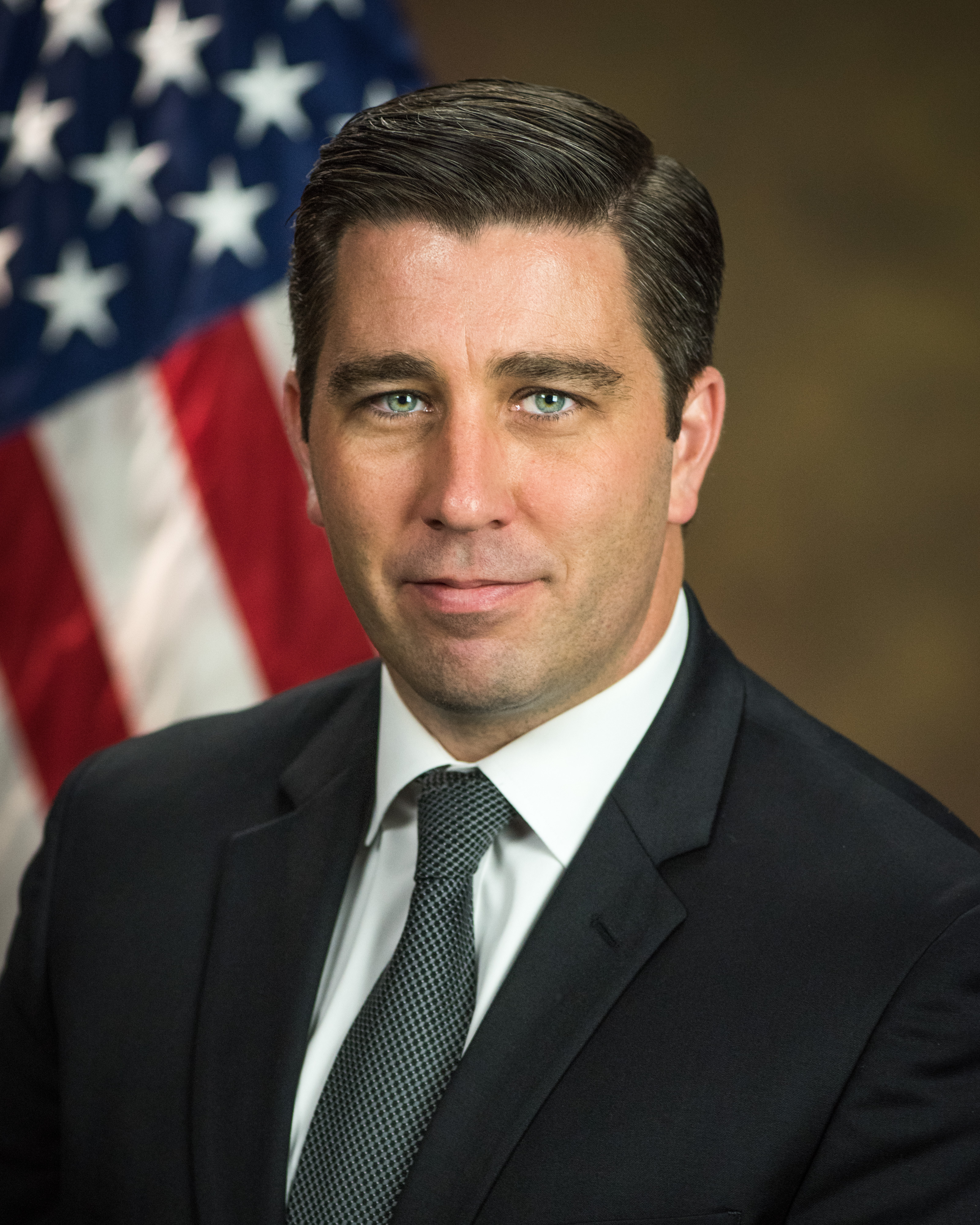

United States Assistant Attorney General for the Office of Legislative Affairs
- In office September 5, 2017 – January 20, 2021
- President: Donald Trump
- Preceded by: Peter Kadzik
- Succeeded by: Carlos Uriarte

Personal details
- Born: 1979 (age 46–47) Birmingham, Alabama, U.S.
- Party: Republican
- Spouse: Brecke Latham (m. 2016)
- Education: University of Alabama (BA, JD)
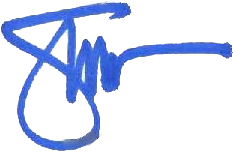
- Signature

Stephen Elliott Boyd (born 1979) is an American lawyer and lobbyist who served as the United States Assistant Attorney General for the Office of Legislative Affairs from 2017 to 2021. He was also chief of staff to Alabama Senator Tommy Tuberville. Boyd has been a partner at Horizons Global Solutions, a lobbying firm, since 2022.

== Career ==
Boyd graduated from the University of Alabama with a Bachelor of Arts and the University of Alabama School of Law with a Juris Doctor. He served as the communications director for Jeff Sessions when Sessions was serving as a U.S. Senator. Boyd was also chief of staff to Representative Martha Roby. On April 25, 2017, Boyd was nominated by President Donald Trump for the position of Assistant Attorney General. He was confirmed to this position by the United States Senate on August 3, 2017.

=== United States Assistant Attorney General ===
As Assistant Attorney General, Boyd managed the Department of Justice's often-tense oversight relationship with Congress. He also worked to implement a legislative agenda in support of the department's law enforcement and national security mission. A former holder of the same office said that Boyd was at "the front line of the struggle" between two branches of government, and that Boyd must "protect the [Justice] Department from legislative interference, but also needs to smooth the way for legitimate congressional oversight", describing the position as dealing with a "four-alarm fire" every day.

Boyd was involved in a number of high-profile issues of interest to Congress. In August 2017, Boyd informed Congressional leaders that the Department of Justice was ending Operation Choke Point, an Obama-era program intended to discourage banks from doing business with a range of companies and individuals deemed "high-risk," including payday lenders, firearm retailers, pornography producers and performers, dating and escort services, and distributors of racist materials. In a letter to the House Committee on the Judiciary, Boyd referred to the program as a "misguided initiative". Boyd wrote that "law abiding businesses should not be targeted simply for operating in an industry that a particular administration might disfavor.…Enforcement decisions should always be made based on facts and the applicable law".

Boyd sought and won congressional approval of legislation to extend the Drug Enforcement Administration's authority to classify synthetic opioid fentanyl variations as Schedule I narcotics, in a bid to help federal prosecutors fight the drug. "In the long term, we support legislation to permanently schedule fentanyl analogues as the dangerous drugs that they are while also making smart improvements to encourage medical research," Boyd said.

Boyd petitioned Congress for more money to improve the FBI's National Instant Criminal Background Check System after firearm sales spiked in 2019.

Boyd advocated for a clarification in federal law to give federal prosecutors an additional tool to fight physical abuse of women and young girls.

Boyd and Attorney General William Barr worked with the Democratic majority in the House of Representatives to draft legislation to reauthorize three expiring provisions of the FISA law and reform the FBI's use of the surveillance tool. The House passed the bill, H.R. 6172, the USA FREEDOM ACT Reauthorization Act of 2020, but the Senate amended the text. In response, Boyd said, "Although that legislation was approved with a large, bipartisan House majority, the Senate thereafter made significant changes that the Department opposed because they would unacceptably impair our ability to pursue terrorists and spies. We have proposed specific fixes to the most significant problems created by the changes the Senate made". The Congress is reconciled the differences between the two bills.

==== Nunes memo ====
When Republican staffers planned to release a classified memo (the "Nunes memo") about FISA warrants during the 2016 election, Boyd wrote a letter denouncing this plan as "extraordinarily reckless". He asked "why the Committee would possibly seek to disclose classified and law enforcement sensitive information without first consulting with the relevant members of the intelligence community" and went on to mention that the Justice Department was "currently unaware of any wrongdoing relating to the FISA process," but that such allegations would be taken seriously, writing "we agree that any abuse of that system cannot be tolerated." Trump was reportedly furious about Boyd's letter, viewing it as "another example of the department undermining him and blocking GOP efforts to expose the political motives behind special counsel Robert Mueller’s probe" It "intensified Trump’s concern that his own department is undercutting him".

On April 18, 2019, a redacted version of the special counsel's report was released to Congress and the public. The 448-page report, with its four appendices, contains about 200,000 words and over 1,100 footnotes. About one-eighth of the lines and 11% of the text are redacted. Redactions were made for four reasons: harm to an ongoing matter, personal privacy, investigative techniques, and grand jury information.

After the Special Counsel's investigation, Boyd engaged in lengthy negotiations with the House Committee on the Judiciary and the House Permanent Select Committee on Intelligence regarding those committees' access to redacted portions of the Special Counsel's report.

Ultimately, in a "rare instance of détente", the department and congressional leaders agreed on a plan to provide certain congressional committees access to a version of the report that protected only grand jury information. Boyd wrote, "the Department is willing to move forward with efforts to accommodate the Committee’s legitimate interests, adding "to be clear, should the Committee take the precipitous and unnecessary action of recommending a contempt finding or other enforcement action against the attorney general, then the Department will not likely be able to continue to work with the Committee to accommodate its interest in these materials". House Democrats later filed a lawsuit in U.S. District Court for the District of Columbia to gain access to the redacted grand jury materials. The Supreme Court is expected to rule on the case in 2021.

On December 9, 2019, Department of Justice Inspector General Michael Horowitz issued a report titled "Review of Four FISA Applications and Other Aspects of the FBI's Crossfire Hurricane Investigation". While the Inspector General did not find evidence that "political bias or improper motivation influenced the FBI's decision to seek FISA authority on Carter Page", he did find 17 "significant inaccuracies and omissions" in the FBI's four FISA applications made to the Foreign Intelligence Surveillance Court to obtain warrants for the surveillance of Page. On February 7, 2020, Boyd informed Congress Attorney General Barr had "determined that it is now in the public interest to release to Congress additional documents and information related to these matters to the extent consistent with national security interests…” Thereafter, Boyd managed a process to provide Congress with redacted documents from the department and the FBI, some recently declassified, regarding the origins of the Russia Investigation and the FBI's use of FISA authority.

== Personnel ==
In July 2020, Attorney General William Barr promoted Boyd's top deputy at the Office of Legislative Affairs, Prim Escalona, to be Interim-United States Attorney for the Northern District of Alabama.

Legal offices
Preceded by Peter Joseph Kadzik	United States Assistant Attorney General for the Office of Legislative Affairs; 2017–2021	Succeeded by Helaine Greenfeld; Acting
