= Seton Hall University School of Law =

Private law school in Newark, New Jersey, US

- Parent school: Seton Hall University
- Religious affiliation: Roman Catholic
- Established: 1951; 75 years ago
- School type: Private
- Dean: Ronald Weich
- Location: Newark, New Jersey; 40°44′11″N 74°09′59″W
- Enrollment: 811
- Faculty: 57 (full-time) 109 (part-time)
- USNWR ranking: 61st (tie) (2024)
- Bar pass rate: 82.23% (2023 first-time takers)
- Website: law.shu.edu
- ABA profile: https://law.shu.edu/admissions/upload/shls-standard-509-report.pdf

Seton Hall University School of Law is the law school of Seton Hall University, and is located in downtown Newark, New Jersey. Seton Hall Law is the only private law school in New Jersey. The school confers three law degrees: Juris Doctor, Master of Laws, and Master of General Legal Studies. Founded in 1951, it is accredited by the American Bar Association (ABA), and is also a member of the Association of American Law Schools (AALS).

== History ==
On February 5, 1951, Seton Hall University School of Law opened on the old John Marshall Law School site at 40 Journal Square in Jersey City with an entering class of 72 students. John Marshall donated its library and assets to Seton Hall with Seton Hall agreeing to maintain and administer the records of John Marshall's graduates. The school was also fully accredited by the American Bar Association in the same year of its opening. In September 1951, the law school moved from Jersey City to Newark and in 1954, graduated its first class. Kathleen M. Boozang became Dean in 2015 succeeding Patrick E. Hobbs. Boozang stepped down from her position as dean effective January 1, 2023, at which time Kip Cornwell was named interim dean. Ronald Weich became Dean in 2024.

Seton Hall Law is the law school of Seton Hall University, which is located in South Orange, New Jersey. Seton Hall Law is located in Downtown Newark, New Jersey. As of February 22, 2026, Jason I. Galak is the Student Bar Association President. For the academic year of 2026-2027, the editor-in-chief of the Seton Hall Law Review is Eliza Schank and the current senior comments editor is Andrew P. Micillo.

== JD programs ==
The J.D. degree program of 88 credits can be pursued as a full-time or a weekend student. Full-time students can complete the program in three years; weekend students can complete in four years or fewer if they accelerate their studies. Weekend students spend alternating weekends on campus each semester and engage in asynchronous online coursework while off-campus.

== Other degree offerings ==
Seton Hall Law offers a Masters in Legal Studies (M.L.S.) with concentrations in Corporate Compliance, Health and Hospital Law, Pharmaceutical and Medical Device Law and Compliance, Gaming Regulation and Compliance, Privacy Law and Cyber Security, Sports Law and Compliance, or General Legal Studies. The master's degree in Legal Studies was named a Best Online Master of Studies in Law Program for 2025 by the Princeton Review.

An Online Master of Laws (LL.M.) is also offered only for those who already hold a J.D. (or its foreign equivalent) with concentrations in Financial Services Compliance, Health Law, and Intellectual Property Law. Seton Hall Law also offers the LL.M. in American Law - an in-person, 24-credit, one-year program for foreign-educated lawyers seeking to practice law in the United States.

The school also offers several joint degree programs with other faculties of the university. For example, there is a combined J.D./M.A. (or MADIR) program with the university's Whitehead School of Diplomacy.

== Admissions ==
For 2024, the school admitted 42.83% of applicants with 28.30% of accepted applicants enrolling. The entering class had a median LSAT score of 161 and median undergraduate GPA of 3.71. No LSAT or GRE is required for the non-J.D. programs.

== Ranking ==
Seton Hall University School of Law placed tied at 61 in the nation in the 2025 U.S. News & World Report rankings. The Law School's Part-Time program was ranked #12 in the nation and the Health Law program at #10 by U.S. News & World Report.

== Bar examination passage ==
Seton Hall Law's overall bar passage rate for 2024 first-time test takers was 87.21%. Seton Hall Law's overall bar passage rate for New Jersey Bar exam first-time test takers was 87.79% (all ABA schools average pass rate was 71.80%). Seton Hall Law's overall bar passage rate for New York Bar exam first-time test takers was 88.0% (all ABA schools average pass rate was 86.30%). For remaining jurisdictions, Seton Hall Law's overall bar passage rate was 76.47% (all ABA schools average pass rate was 76.91%). The Ultimate Bar Pass Rate, which the ABA defines as the passage rate for graduates who sat for bar examinations within two years of graduating, was 92.23% for the class of 2022.

== Employment ==
Total employment rate for the Class of 2024 J.D. program was 95.22%. Bar passage required employment (i.e., as attorneys) totaled 85.35% and J.D. Advantage employment totaled 6.05%. Of graduates, 41.81% held positions in state, local, or territorial judicial clerkships, four students (1.34%) held federal clerkships, 35.12% were employed in law firms of various sizes, 10.70% were employed in business or industry, 7.36% employed by government, 3.34% in public interest, 0.33% in education, and 2.87% were unemployed.

== Costs ==
The tuition and fees for Seton Hall University School of Law are $71,550 for incoming full-time students and $55,460 for incoming part-time students for the 2025–26 academic year. However, 86% of incoming students in 2024 received scholarship funding, and 75%-85% of funded students typically renew scholarships after the first year.

The median grant amount was $42,000 for full-time students and $19,400 for weekend students, bringing net-tuition (tuition less scholarship and grants) for those receiving the median grant amount to $27,206 for full-time students and $19,754 for weekend students.

== Publications ==
The school produces two journals: Seton Hall Law Review and the Seton Hall Journal of Legislation and Public Policy.

== Campus ==
One Newark Center
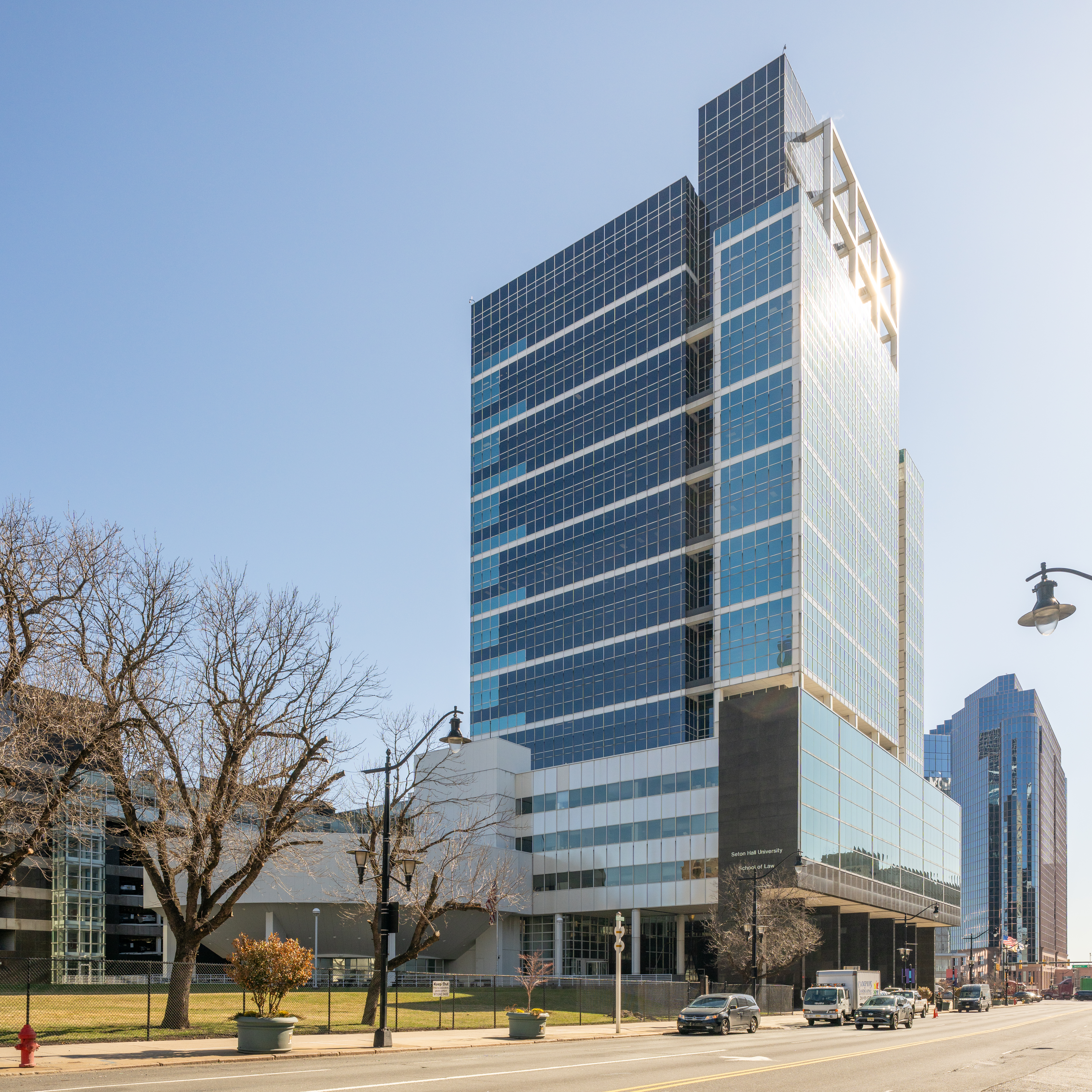
- Interactive map of the One Newark Center area

General information
- Type: educational/office
- Location: 1109 Raymond Boulevard; Newark, New Jersey
- Coordinates: 40°44′11″N 74°09′59″W
- Completed: 1992

Height
- Roof: 99 m (325 ft)

Technical details
- Floor count: 22
- Floor area: 633,000 sq ft (58,800 m^{2})

Design and construction
- Architect: Grad Associates

At One Newark Center, the Law School is housed in a 22-story building in Downtown Newark completed in 1991. The Newark Campus building provides 210,000 square feet (20,000 m^{2}) including 65,000 square feet (6,000 m^{2}) of library, named for Congressman Peter W. Rodino, Jr.. It is at the corner of Raymond Boulevard and McCarter Highway, two blocks west of Penn Station Newark, where numerous connections can be made to New Jersey Transit and PATH (an approximate 20 minute ride to Manhattan). While many students commute from around the New York metropolitan area, other students choose to reside at Eleven 80, the Union Building, and Renaissance Towers. One Newark Center is one of the tallest buildings in the city and also contains commercial offices. Nearby attractions include the New Jersey Performing Arts Center, Newark Museum, Prudential Center and Red Bull Arena.

== Staff ==
Ronald Weich became Dean of Seton Hall University School of Law on July 1, 2024.

== Notable alumni ==
- Madeline Cox Arleo (J.D. 1989), federal judge for the United States District Court for the District of New Jersey
- Antonio Arocho (J.D. 1984), former executive director of the Hispanic National Bar Association
- Christopher Bateman (J.D. 1987), New Jersey Senator representing the 16th District.
- John O. Bennett (J.D., 1974), former New Jersey State Senator and acting Governor.
- Craig Carpenito (J.D., 2000), former United States Attorney for the District of New Jersey.
- Dennis M. Cavanaugh (J.D., 1972), federal judge (retired) for the United States District Court for the District of New Jersey
- Michael Chagares (J.D., 1987), federal judge on the United States Court of Appeals for the Third Circuit
- Chris Christie (J.D., 1987), former Governor of New Jersey, former United States Attorney for the District of New Jersey
- Clay Constantinou (J.D., 1981), former US Ambassador to Luxembourg from 1994 to 1999.
- Michellene Davis (J.D., 1997), former New Jersey State Treasurer from 2007 to 2008 and the first African American to hold this office.
- Patrick J. Diegnan, (J.D. 1973), New Jersey Senator representing the 18th District
- Donald DiFrancesco (J.D., 1969), former Governor of New Jersey
- Michael J. Doherty (J.D. 1993), New Jersey Senator representing the 23rd District.
- Vicky Flynn (J.D. 1999), New Jersey Assemblywoman representing the 13th District
- Thomas W. Greelish (J.D., 1971), United States Attorney for the District of New Jersey from 1985 to 1987
- Reed Gusciora (J.D., 1988), Mayor of Trenton, New Jersey and former New Jersey Assemblyman from 1996 to 2018.
- Katharine Sweeney Hayden (J.D., 1975), Federal judge for the United States District of New Jersey.
- Jerramiah Healy (J.D.), former mayor of Jersey City, New Jersey
- Noel Lawrence Hillman (J.D., 1985), federal judge for the United States District Court for the District of New Jersey.
- Sean T. Kean (J.D. 1995), New Jersey Senator representing the 11th District.
- Paul Matey (J.D., 2001), federal judge on the United States Court of Appeals for the Third Circuit
- John F. McKeon (J.D., 1983), New Jersey Senator and former mayor of West Orange, New Jersey.
- Mark McNulty (politician) (J.D., 1973), former Delaware Secretary of Transportation, who served in cabinet of Governor Dale E. Wolf
- Raj Mukherji (J.D., 2013), New Jersey Senator representing the 32nd District and former Majority Whip and Deputy Speaker of the New Jersey General Assembly.
- Bart Oates (J.D. 1990), three-time Super Bowl Champion and President of the New Jersey Hall of Fame
- Joel A. Pisano (J.D., 1974), retired federal judge for the United States District Court for the District of New Jersey (2000–2015)
- Anthony Principi (J.D., 1975), 4th United States Secretary of Veterans Affairs
- Stuart Risch (J.D., 1987), lieutenant general and 41st Judge Advocate General of the United States Army
- Richie Roberts (J.D., 1970), former detective and attorney responsible for the arrest and prosecution of Frank Lucas, portrayed by Russell Crowe in the film American Gangster
- Peter G. Sheridan (J.D., 1977), U.S. District Judge for the United States District Court for the District of New Jersey
- Michael A. Shipp (J.D., 1994), U.S. District Judge for the United States District Court for the District of New Jersey
- Bob Smith (J.D. 1981), New Jersey Senator representing the 17th District.
- Mark Sokolich (J.D. 1988), Mayor of Fort Lee, New Jersey
- Walter F. Timpone (J.D. 1979), former Associate Justice for the Supreme Court of New Jersey
- Shirley Tolentino (J.D., 1971), the first black woman to serve on New Jersey Superior Court and the first black woman appointed to the Jersey City Municipal Court and to serve as its presiding judge.

== See also ==
- Lists of law schools
- Post-secondary education in New Jersey
- Rutgers School of Law-Newark
- Rutgers School of Law–Camden
