= Alma Asay =

American businesswoman

- Education: Pennsylvania State University; New York University School of Law
- Occupations: CEO and co-founder of Allegory Law
- Employer: Crowell & Moring

Alma Asay was the CEO and co-founder, along with Dana Peterson, of Allegory Law, a legal technology company that provided a software platform for litigation management.

== Career ==
Asay co-founded Allegory Law after departing a career at Gibson Dunn & Crutcher, where she learned from and worked with top litigation attorney Orin Snyder working on complex litigation. Disagreements with Peterson led to the founding team breakup, and Asay had to sell her home to fund the startup, leading to her having to stay on couches of friends and family to extend her financial runway. In addition, in the early stages of the startup, the members of Asay's engineering team were paid in equity; and when they decided the product was ready to launch, Asay disagreed, thinking more work was needed. This forced the company to a standstill, and it took a year to raise the money needed to buy out her partners so she could restart her work. Since then, Asay closed a convertible debt round in early 2014, raised $715,000 from individuals in late 2016, and raised $500,000 from legal tech executives and investors in early 2017.

Allegory Law was acquired by New York-based Integreon in November 2017, Asay joined Integreon as Chief Innovation Officer. On March 30, 2022, Asay joined a legal technology company, Litera, where she joined LiteraTV lineup ahead of its launch. A few months thereafter, on August 21, 2020, Litera acquired Allegory Law from Integreon, reuniting the founder to her original legaltech startup. However, Asay has mentioned in interviews that Litera did not consult her during its strategic planning sessions to acquire Allegory Law and she did not take any leadership role with respect to Allegory Law after its acquisition, which had been rebranded as Litera Litigate. As of June 28, 2021, Asay joined the law firm Crowell & Moring as the senior director of practice innovation and client value.

Asay is regularly invited to speak on the topics of legal technology and innovation. She is also vocal on the topic of women entrepreneurs in technology. In 2016, she was named one of the ABA Legal Technology Research Center's Women of Legal Tech, as well as a winner of the FastCase 50.

Asay received her B.A. in Psychology from the Pennsylvania State University, then received her J.D. from the NYU School of Law.
