= Patricia Wald =

American judge (1928–2019)

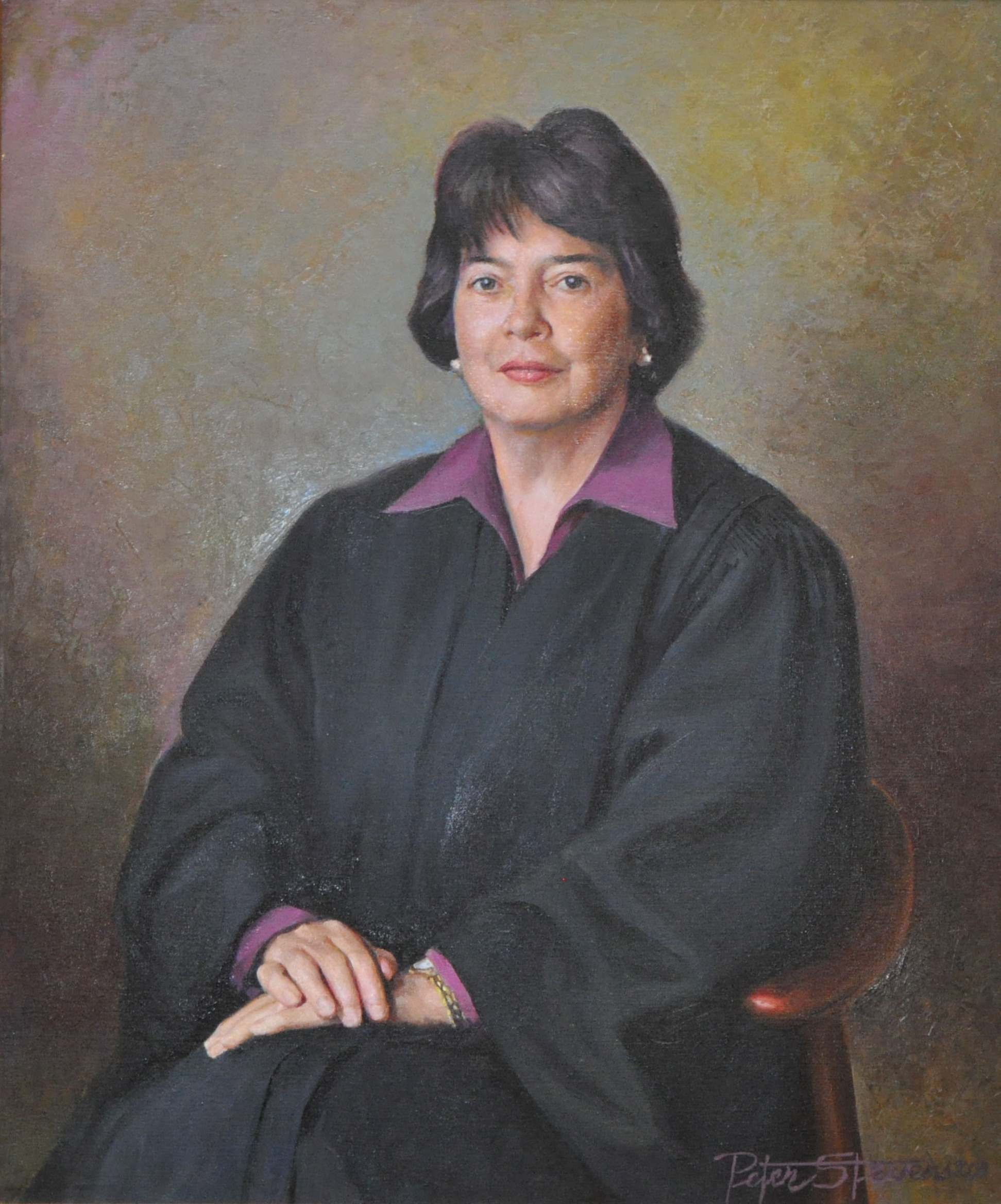
- Official portrait, 2000

Justice of the International Criminal Tribunal for the Former Yugoslavia
- In office November 17, 1999 – November 17, 2001
- Appointed by: Kofi Annan
- Preceded by: Gabrielle McDonald
- Succeeded by: Theodor Meron

Chief Judge of the United States Court of Appeals for the District of Columbia Circuit
- In office July 26, 1986 – January 19, 1991
- Preceded by: Spottswood William Robinson III
- Succeeded by: Abner Mikva

Judge of the United States Court of Appeals for the District of Columbia Circuit
- In office July 26, 1979 – November 16, 1999
- Appointed by: Jimmy Carter
- Preceded by: Seat established by 92 Stat. 1629.
- Succeeded by: Thomas B. Griffith

United States Assistant Attorney General for the Office of Legislative Affairs
- In office 1977–1979
- President: Jimmy Carter
- Preceded by: Michael Uhlmann
- Succeeded by: Robert McConnell

Personal details
- Born: Patricia Ann McGowan; September 12, 1928 Torrington, Connecticut, U.S.
- Died: January 12, 2019 (aged 90) Washington, D.C., U.S.
- Party: Democratic
- Education: Connecticut College (BA); Yale University (LLB)
- Awards: American Philosophical Society (2000); Presidential Medal of Freedom (2013)

Patricia Ann McGowan Wald (/wɔːld/; née McGowan; September 16, 1928 – January 12, 2019) was an American lawyer and jurist who served as the chief judge of the United States Court of Appeals for the District of Columbia Circuit from 1986 until 1991. She was the Court's first female chief judge and its first woman to be elevated, having been appointed by President Jimmy Carter in 1979. From 1999 to 2001, Wald was a Justice of the International Criminal Tribunal for the former Yugoslavia.

Wald was born in Torrington, Connecticut, to a working-class family. After graduating from Connecticut College with distinction, a scholarship enabled her to study at Yale Law School, where she became one of two female editors of the Yale Law Journal. Wald sought a position at a white-shoe firm upon graduation but was turned down for being a woman. She began her legal career as a law clerk to Judge Jerome Frank instead, later entering the law firm of Arnold, Fortas & Porter as an associate attorney. After spending a year at the U.S. Department of Justice, Wald's tenure as a practicing lawyer included appointments on various presidential commissions and committees.

In 1977, President Jimmy Carter appointed Wald as a U.S. Assistant Attorney General for the Office of Legislative Affairs. In 1979, Carter elevated her to the D.C. Circuit, where she received her commission as its first female member. During her time on the Court, Wald would pen more than 800 judicial opinions.

== Early life ==
Wald was born on September 16, 1928, in Torrington, Connecticut. She was the only child of Joseph F. McGowan, an alcoholic, and Margaret O'Keefe. Her father left the family when she was two years old, leaving Wald to be raised by her mother with the company and support of extended relatives, most of whom were factory workers in Torrington and active union members. Wald had a Roman Catholic upbringing, and worked in brass mills as a teenager during the summers. Due to her involvement in the labor movement and union work, she was determined to go to law school to help protect underprivileged, working-class people.

=== Education ===
Wald attended Torrington's St. Francis School and graduated in 1940. She then went on to graduate from Torrington High School in 1944 as the class valedictorian. She graduated first in her class and joined the Phi Beta Kappa society at Connecticut College in 1948. She was able to attend the college because of a scholarship that she received from an elderly affluent woman from her hometown. She then received a national fellowship from the Pepsi-Cola Company that allowed her to earn her law degree from Yale Law School in 1951. She graduated with only 11 other women that year out of a class of 200. Along with the national fellowship, Wald also paid for law school by working as a waitress and taking research jobs with professors. At Yale, she was an editor on the Yale Law Journal, one of the two women in her class to be one.

After her graduation, she clerked for Judge Jerome Frank of the United States Court of Appeals for the Second Circuit for a year. That year, Frank ruled on the appeal of the espionage convictions of Ethel and Julius Rosenberg. She briefly entered private practice at the law firm of Arnold, Fortas & Porter for a year before she left to raise her five children.

== Professional career ==
It would be six years before she would take on part-time consulting and researching positions. She was a research and editorial assistant for Frederick M. Rowe, Esq. for three years from 1959 to 1962. She took a year off and then in 1963 spent a year as a member of the National Conference on Bail and Criminal Justice. Wald then worked as a consultant for the National Conference on Law & Poverty in its Office of Economic Opportunity. In 1964, she co-authored the book Bail in the United States, which helped reform the nation's bail system. She then was appointed to the President's Commission on Crime in the District of Columbia from 1965 to 1966 by President Lyndon B. Johnson. She continued her consulting work for the President's Commission on Law Enforcement & Administration of Criminal Justice for a year.

Wald then joined the United States Department of Justice in 1967 and spent a year as an attorney in the Office of Criminal Justice. From 1968 to 1970, she was an attorney at Neighborhood Legal Services in Washington, D.C. During her tenure at Neighborhood Legal Services Program she was also a consultant for both the National Advisory Committee on Civil Disorder and the National Commission on the Causes and Prevention of Violence. She also co-directed the Ford Foundation's Drug Abuse Research Project during 1970. She then became an attorney at the Center for Law and Social Policy from 1971 to 1972 and from there switched to work as an attorney at the Mental Health Law Project for five years. During that time, she was also the director of the Office of Policy and Issues in the vice presidential campaign of Sargent Shriver. Wald then went back to the Department of Justice from 1977 to 1979. She became a founding member of the National Association of Women Judges in 1979. A Democrat, she served as Assistant Attorney General for Legislative Affairs during much of the Carter administration before being nominated by Carter to the DC Circuit.

== D.C. Circuit ==
Wald was nominated by President Jimmy Carter on April 30, 1979, to the United States Court of Appeals for the District of Columbia Circuit, to a new seat created by 92 Stat. 1629. The Carter administration created a set of guidelines to be used by the United States Circuit Judge Nominating Commission that was geared to be friendlier towards women in an effort to increase the number of female federal judges. She was confirmed by the United States Senate on July 24, 1979, and received her commission on July 26, 1979. She served as Chief Judge from 1986 to 1991. She was the first woman to be appointed to the District of Columbia Circuit and was also the first woman to serve as its chief judge.

In 1994, Wald became involved with American Bar Association's (ABA) Central European and Eurasian Law Initiative, where she attempted to aid new Eastern European democracies rebuild their legal systems after the fall of the Soviet Union.

== Post judicial service ==
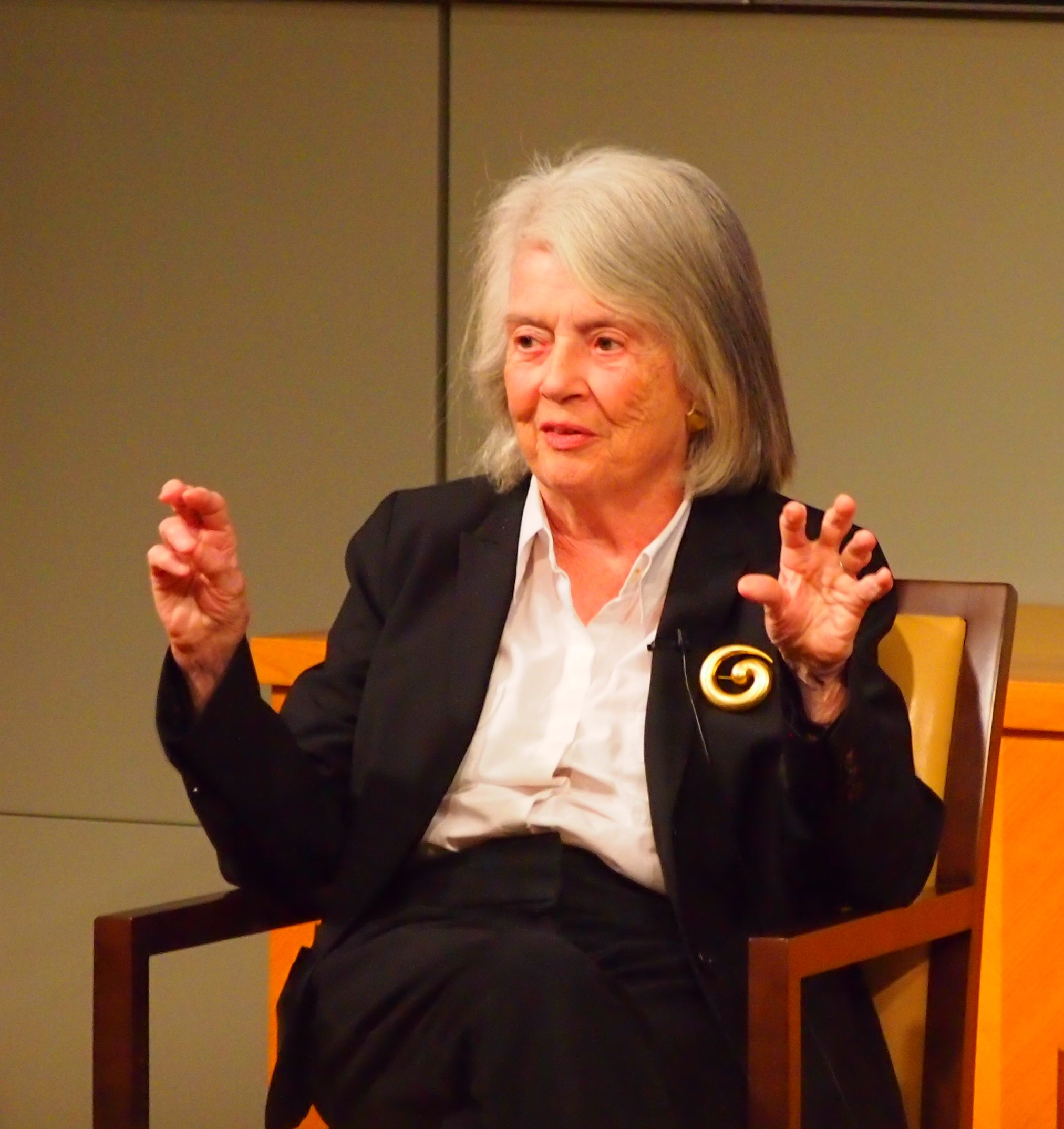
Wald speaking at the Cato Institute, 2015

After retiring from the federal judiciary, Wald was the United States's representative to the International Criminal Tribunal for the Former Yugoslavia from 1999 to 2002. She presided over numerous cases of people accused of genocide. Some of the accused included those involved in the Srebrenica massacre. On February 6, 2004, Wald was appointed by President Bush to the President's Commission on Intelligence Capabilities of the U.S. Regarding Weapons of Mass Destruction, an independent panel tasked with investigating U.S. intelligence surrounding the United States' 2003 invasion of Iraq and Iraq's weapons of mass destruction. The commission was co-chaired by Laurence Silberman, a fellow judge who worked with Wald on the bench of the District of Columbia Circuit Court. Silberman had a great deal of respect for Wald despite their ideological differences and did not hesitate to recommend her appointment to the bi-partisan commission. Wald agreed to serve on the Constitution Project's Guantanamo Task Force in December 2010.

In August 2012, Wald was confirmed by the Senate as a member of the Privacy and Civil Liberties Oversight Board after being nominated by President Barack Obama. On December 12, 2013, the Senate invoked cloture on her nomination by a 57–41 vote, thus cutting off a filibuster that had been led by Republican senators. Later that same day, Wald was confirmed by a 57–41 vote. Wald left the Board in January 2017.

She served as chair of the board of directors of the Open Society Justice Initiative and was a member of the board of directors for Mental Disability Rights International. She also continued to serve on the board of the American Bar Association's International Criminal Court Project. Wald was a member of the global council of the California International Law Center at the University of California, Davis School of Law. She was also a member of the American Law Institute, the American Philosophical Society, and the Whitney R. Harris World Law Institute's International Council.

== Personal life ==
Patricia Wald was married to Robert Lewis Wald, who was also a Yale Law School graduate. They were married in 1951, when Patricia was 23; they had met in Europe as they were both traveling the continent. Together they had three daughters and two sons within the span of seven years: Sarah, Doug, Johanna, Frederica, and Thomas. Robert Wald died on September 7, 2010. Wald died in Washington, D.C., on January 12, 2019, from pancreatic cancer, aged 90.

== Honors and awards ==
Wald has been awarded more than 20 honorary degrees; in 2001, she was awarded an honorary Doctor of Laws by her alma mater, Yale University. In 2002, she was honored for her lifelong commitment to human rights by the International Human Rights Law Group. She was the recipient of the Margaret Brent Award of the American Bar Association for achieving professional excellence in her field and influencing other women to pursue legal careers. Wald received the American Lawyer Hall of Fame Lifetime Achievement Award in 2004 and then four years later in 2008, she was awarded the American Bar Association Medal, the highest honor awarded by the ABA. She also was recognized by the Constitution Project as the 2011 Constitutional Champion. On November 20, 2013, Wald was awarded the Presidential Medal of Freedom, the nation's highest civilian honor.

== See also ==
- List of first women lawyers and judges in Washington D.C.

== Bibliography ==
=== Journals ===
- Edwards, Harry T. (Winter 2000). "Farewell to the Honorable Patricia M. Wald". Administrative Law Review. 52 (1): 5–7. ISSN 0001-8368. JSTOR 40711856.
- Posner, Richard (1995). "Judges' Writing Styles (And Do They Matter?)". University of Chicago Law Review. 62 (4): 1421–1449. doi:10.2307/1600108. ISSN 0041-9494. JSTOR 1600108.
- Wald, Patricia M. (1995). "A Reply to Judge Posner". University of Chicago Law Review. 62 (4): 1451–1454. doi:10.2307/1600109. JSTOR 1600109.
- Wald, Patricia M. (1995). "The Rhetoric of Results and the Results of Rhetoric: Judicial Writings". University of Chicago Law Review. 62 (4): 1371–1419. doi:10.2307/1600107. ISSN 0041-9494. JSTOR 1600107.

Legal offices
Preceded by Michael Uhlmann	United States Assistant Attorney General for the Office of Legislative Affairs; 1977–1979	Succeeded by Robert McConnell
New seat	Judge of the United States Court of Appeals for the District of Columbia Circuit; 1979–1999	Succeeded by Thomas Griffith
Preceded by Spottswood Robinson	Chief Judge of the United States Court of Appeals for the District of Columbia Circuit; 1986–1991	Succeeded by Abner Mikva
