= Carlos Uriarte =

American lawyer (born 1979)

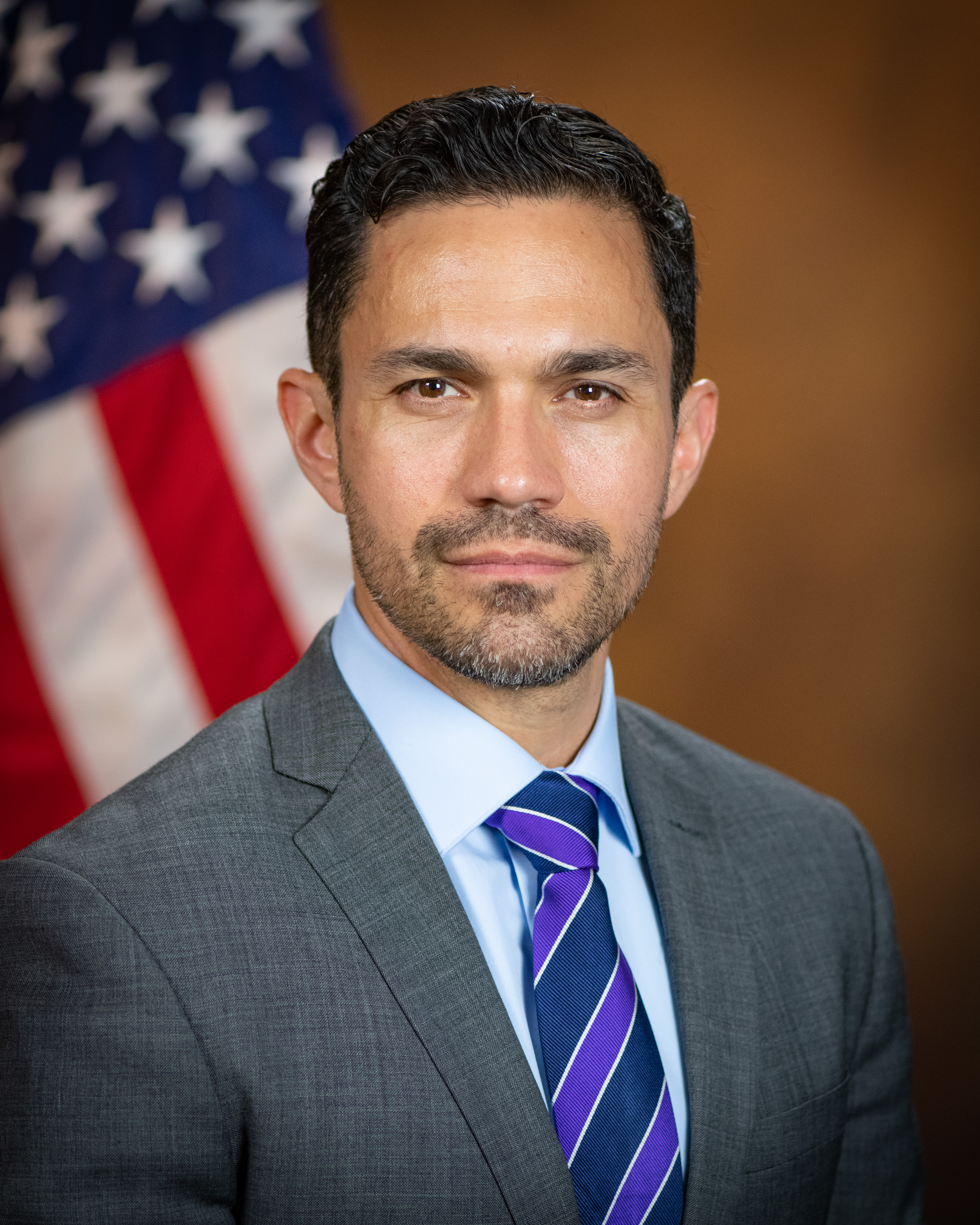

United States Assistant Attorney General for the Office of Legislative Affairs
- In office August 15, 2022 – January 20, 2025
- President: Joe Biden
- Preceded by: Stephen Boyd
- Succeeded by: Patrick Davis

Personal details
- Born: Carlos Filipe Uriarte; December 10, 1979 (age 46) San Leandro, California, U.S.
- Party: Democratic
- Education: Washington University (BA); University of Pennsylvania (JD)

Carlos Felipe Uriarte (born December 10, 1979) is an American attorney who had served the assistant attorney general for legislative affairs.

== Early life and education ==
Uriarte was born on December 10, 1979, in San Leandro, California. He earned a Bachelor of Arts degree in American culture studies from the Washington University in St. Louis in 2002 and a Juris Doctor from the University of Pennsylvania Law School in 2005.

== Career ==
Uriarte worked as a summer associate at Heller Ehrman and Akin Gump Strauss Hauer & Feld. From 2006 to 2007, Uriarte served as a law clerk for Judge Juan Ramon Sánchez of the United States District Court for the Eastern District of Pennsylvania. From 2007 to 2009, he worked as a white collar and antitrust associate at Crowell & Moring. He then served as legislative counsel to Congresswoman Judy Chu and counsel to the United States House Committee on Oversight and Reform. In 2013 and 2014, he served as senior counsel to the secretary of the United States Department of the Interior. From 2014 to 2017, he served as associate deputy attorney general in the Office of the Deputy Attorney General. After the end of the Obama administration, Uriarte worked as a vice president at Capital One. In 2020 and 2021, he served as chief counsel for the United States House Select Oversight Subcommittee on the Coronavirus Crisis. Since April 2021, he has worked as vice president and regulator counsel for Unite Us, a technology company.

=== Biden administration ===
On May 3, 2022, President Joe Biden nominated Uriarte to be an assistant attorney general for legislative affairs. A hearing was held before the Senate Judiciary Committee on June 22, 2022. On July 21, 2022, his nomination was reported out committee by a 13–9 vote. He was confirmed via voice vote on August 4, 2022.

== Affiliations ==
Uriarte is a member of the following bar associations:

- State Bar of California (2005–present)
- District of Columbia Bar (2006–present)
- American Bar Association
- Hispanic National Bar Association
- Hispanic Bar Association of DC
- National LGBTQ+ Bar Association
