= Kathleen M. Boozang =

University dean and law professor

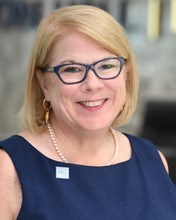
- Kathleen M. Boozang, Professor of Law, Seton Hall University School of Law
- Born: April 21, 1959 (age 67); Galveston, Texas, U.S.
- Education: Boston College (B.S.); Washington University in St. Louis (J.D.); Yale Law School (LL.M.)
- Predecessor: Patrick E. Hobbs
- Website: http://law.shu.edu/faculty/full-time/Kathleen-Boozang.cfm

Kathleen M. Boozang (born April 21, 1959) is the former dean and professor of law at Seton Hall University School of Law. Boozang joined Seton Hall in 1990 after practicing law for several years. In July 2015, she became the eighth dean of Seton Hall Law. She resigned in 2022.

== Career ==
She launched the Health Law & Policy Program (1993), which has been ranked in the top 10 of U.S. News & World Report.

== Works, honors and recognition ==
Boozang was elected to the American Bar Foundation in 2008 and the American Law Institute in 2009.

Boozang was honored by The New Jersey Law Journal, which gave her a Lifetime Achievement Award in 2016 and named her to its list of Top Women in the Law in 2018.
