= Michael Uhlmann =

American political scientist (1939–2019)

United States Assistant Attorney General for the Office of Legislative Affairs
- In office 1975–1977
- President: Gerald Ford
- Preceded by: Mitch McConnell (acting)
- Succeeded by: Patricia Wald

Personal details
- Born: Michael Martin Uhlmann; December 29, 1939 Washington, D.C., U.S.
- Died: October 8, 2019 (aged 79) Newport Beach, California, U.S.
- Education: Yale University (BA); University of Virginia (JD); Claremont Graduate University (PhD)

Michael Martin Uhlmann (December 29, 1939 – October 8, 2019) was an American political scientist and high-ranking government official.

== Early life and education ==
Uhlmann was born on December 29, 1939, in Washington, D.C. He graduated from The Hill School in 1958. He received his undergraduate degree from Yale University, a Juris Doctor from the University of Virginia School of Law, and a Ph.D. from Claremont Graduate University.

== Career ==
=== Government official ===
Before beginning his career as an academic, Uhlmann served as Assistant Attorney General for the Office of Legislative Affairs during the Ford Administration from 1975 to 1977, and as special assistant to the President during Ronald Reagan's first term in office. He also spent several years as a partner at the Washington, D.C. office of Pepper Hamilton., where he specialized in federal antitrust, administrative, and environmental law. In 1989, Uhlmann discovered that President George H. W. Bush planned to appoint him to the United States Court of Appeals for the District of Columbia Circuit, and declined the position so that he could prioritize family life.

In 1979, Michael Uhlmann was profiled in The New York Times by Arthur Ochs Sulzberger Jr. for his work as President of the National Legal Center for the Public Interest. In 2002, Uhlmann became a Professor of Government at Claremont Graduate University, where his specialty was the American presidency, congressional-executive relations, and the federal judiciary.

=== Writings ===
Uhlmann was a frequent contributor to the Claremont Review of Books with articles like "The Supreme Court v. the Constitution of the United States of America" and "The Right Stuff", a panegyric of the life, writings, and talent of William F. Buckley Jr. Other articles written by Uhlmann appeared in the Los Angeles Times, National Review, The American Spectator, Washington Times, Crisis, and The Human Life Review. His final book was Last Rights?: Assisted Suicide and Euthanasia Debated. Additionally, his work The Electoral College: Proven Constitutional Pillar of Freedom includes his 1970 testimony before the Senate Judiciary Committee, in which he defended the propriety of the Electoral College and discussed the central role this provision plays in the constitutional structure of the United States.

== Academic career ==
He was Professor of Government in the Department of Politics and Government at Claremont Graduate University and Claremont McKenna College. Before teaching at Claremont, Uhlmann was a senior fellow at the Ethics and Public Policy Center, Vice President for Public Policy Research at the Bradley Foundation in Milwaukee, Wisconsin, and taught at the Antonin Scalia Law School.

== Personal life ==
Uhlmann died on October 8, 2019, in Newport Beach, California. Five children and ten grandchildren survived him.
