= Helaine Greenfeld =

American lawyer

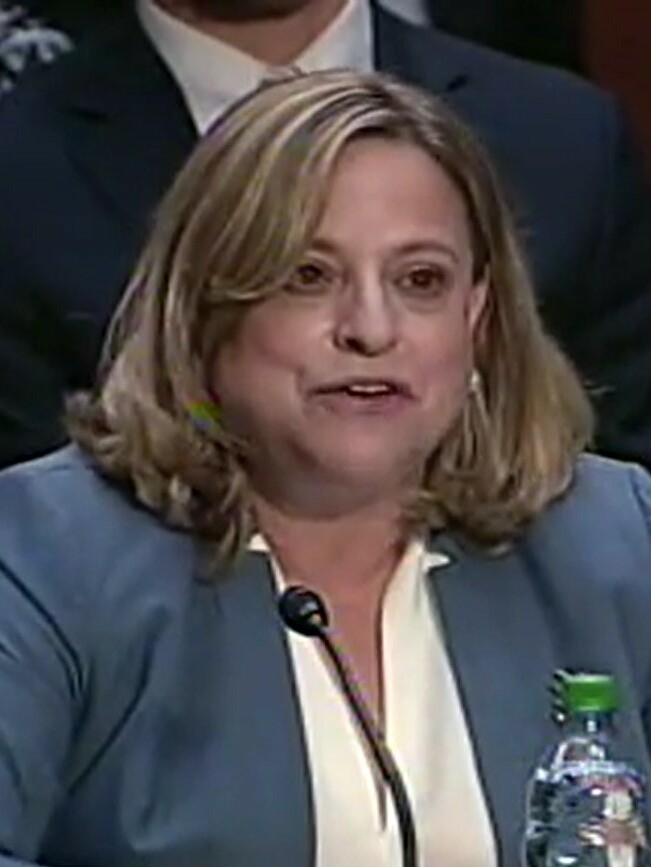
- Greenfeld in 2021

Assistant Attorney General for Legislative Affairs
- Acting
- In office January 20, 2021 – November 22, 2021
- President: Joe Biden
- Preceded by: Stephen Boyd
- Succeeded by: Peter Hyun (Acting)

Personal details
- Born: Helaine Ann Greenfeld; 1963 (age 62–63) Baltimore, Maryland, U.S.
- Party: Democratic
- Children: 2
- Education: Yale University (BA); Georgetown University (JD)

Helaine Ann Greenfeld (born 1963) is an American attorney who was the nominee to serve as Assistant Attorney General for Legislative Affairs in the Biden administration.

== Early life and education ==
A native of Baltimore, Greenfeld earned a Bachelor of Arts degree from Yale University and a Juris Doctor from the Georgetown University Law Center.

== Career ==
Greenfeld served as a law clerk to Judge Mariana Pfaelzer of the United States District Court for the Central District of California from August to December 1992. From 2001 to 2006, Greenfeld worked as legal counsel for the United States Senate Committee on the Judiciary. She also worked in the United States Department of Justice during the Clinton administration, including in the Civil Rights Division and Office of Legal Policy. She later served as chief nominations counsel to Vermont Senator Patrick Leahy before returning to the Department of Justice during the Obama administration, working as deputy associate attorney general and a counselor to then-Attorney General Eric Holder. From August 2017 to November 2019, Greenfeld served as chief counsel to Hawaii Senator Mazie Hirono. In 2020, she was special counsel to the Senate Committee on the Judiciary during the confirmation process of Amy Coney Barrett.

=== Biden administration ===
After Joe Biden assumed office as president in January 2021, Greenfeld joined the U.S. Department of Justice Office of Legislative Affairs as acting assistant attorney general. In April 2021, she was nominated to serve in the position in a permanent capacity. Hearings were held before the Senate Judiciary Committee on June 23, 2021. The committee favorably reported her nomination to the Senate floor on July 22, 2021. Greenfeld's nomination ultimately stalled in the Senate and was returned to President Biden on January 3, 2022.
