= Ramona Romero =

American lawyer and government official

General Counsel of the United States Department of Agriculture
- In office January 14, 2011 – December 1, 2014
- President: Barack Obama
- Secretary: Tom Vilsack

Personal details
- Born: Dominican Republic
- Children: 2
- Education: Barnard College (BA); Harvard Law School (JD)
- Occupation: Lawyer

Ramona Emilia Romero is an American lawyer and former government official. She was the General Counsel of the United States Department of Agriculture and currently serves as Vice President and General Counsel of Princeton University.

== Biography ==
Romero was born in the Dominican Republic and emigrated to the United States when she was 11 years old. She graduated from Barnard College in 1985 and was president of the student government her senior year. She then went to Harvard Law School and was director of the Harvard Prison Legal Assistance Project. She received her J.D. from Harvard in 1988.

From 1988 to 1996, Romero was a lawyer at Crowell & Moring, where she defended clients in civil and criminal enforcement actions brought by the Federal government of the United States. She joined DuPont in 1998 as Senior Counsel, then Corporate Counsel in charge of commercial and antitrust litigation, and Corporate Counsel and Manager of Operations and Partnering. From 2008 to 2010, she was also General Counsel of DuPont joint venture Sentinel Transportation. She was President of the Hispanic National Bar Association from 2008 to 2009, and testified at the U.S. Senate confirmation hearing for U.S. Supreme Court Justice Sonia Sotomayor in that capacity.

In 2010, Romero was nominated by President Barack Obama to be General Counsel of the United States Department of Agriculture. She was confirmed by the United States Senate in late December 2010 and was sworn in on January 14, 2011.

Romero left USDA for Princeton University in 2014, when she became the University's Chief Legal Officer.

In 2019, Romero was named a trustee of Barnard College. She was appointed by President Joe Biden to the President's Commission on White House Fellowships in 2021.

Romero is an elected member of the American Law Institute.

== Personal life and family ==
Romero lives in Princeton, New Jersey, with her husband and two daughters.
