= Andrew Fois =

American lawyer (born 1958)

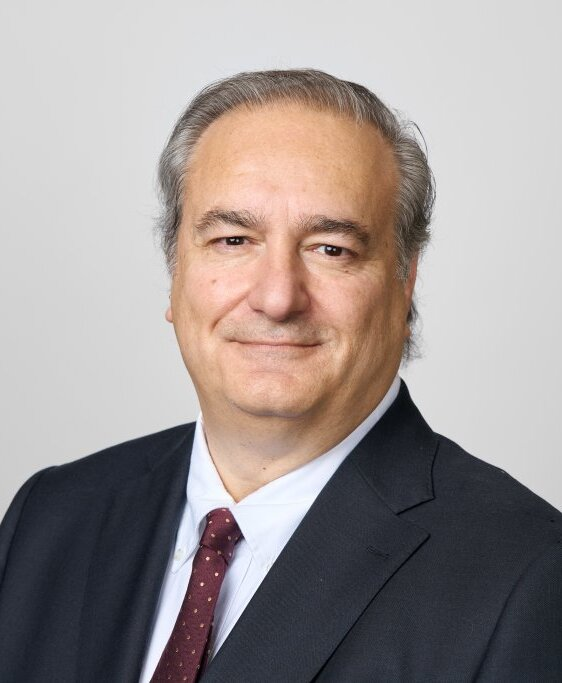

Chairman of the Administrative Conference of the United States
- In office May 31, 2022 – January 20, 2025
- President: Joe Biden
- Preceded by: Paul R. Verkuil (2015)
- Succeeded by: TBC

United States Assistant Attorney General for Legislative Affairs
- In office 1995–1998
- President: Bill Clinton
- Preceded by: Thomas Boyd
- Succeeded by: Robert Raben

Personal details
- Born: June 16, 1958 (age 67) New York City, New York, U.S.
- Education: Georgetown University (BA, JD); University of Essex (MA)

Andrew Fois (born June 16, 1958) is an attorney who served as the chair of the Administrative Conference of the United States from 2022 to 2025. He served as the deputy attorney general for public safety in the Office of the Attorney General in Washington, D.C. from April 9, 2012, to March 2015. He was awarded the Edmund Randolph Award, the Justice Department's highest honor for distinguished service.

== Education and academic career ==
Fois graduated from Georgetown University in 1979 cum laude with a Bachelor of Arts in government and history and from Georgetown University Law Center in 1983. He holds a master's degree from the University of Essex, UK in American Government. He is a member of the bar in Washington, D.C., New York and Florida as well as the bars of the U.S. District Court, the U.S. Court of Appeals for the D.C. Circuit and the U.S. Supreme Court.

Fois taught criminal procedure and trial practice courses at the Georgetown University Law Center and was also an adjunct professor at Washington College of Law of American University.

== Background ==
Fois served as the deputy attorney general for public safety in the Office of the Attorney General in Washington, D.C. In that role he was responsible for the supervision of all juvenile prosecutions, many criminal offenses such as DUI and DWI, victim and neighborhood services. He supervised the work of the General Counsels of five DC public safety agencies. Three years previous to that, Fois was a managing director of the National Crime Prevention Council (home of McGruff the Crime Dog) with a wide range of responsibilities involving crime prevention, grant administrations, legal matters, communications, community outreach, government relations and management. During that time he was a frequent analyst on television, radio and the Internet on various political, legal and policy issues.

== Public service ==
In 1995, Fois was nominated by President Clinton and confirmed by the U.S. Senate to serve as assistant attorney general for the Office of Legislative Affairs in the United States Department of Justice. He had previously served as an associate deputy attorney general to Deputy AG Jamie Gorelick and as counsel to Attorney General Janet Reno during which time he helped lead the enactment and implementation of the 1994 comprehensive crime act. This landmark legislation included the COPS program, drug courts, the assault weapons ban, and the Violence Against Women Act.

He was recommended twice and nominated once for a seat on the D.C. Superior Court. He has been recognized with several professional awards including the Edmund Randolph Award, the Justice Department's highest honor for distinguished service. He has been a Wasserstein Fellow at Harvard University.

On August 4, 2021, President Joe Biden announced Fois to be the Chair of the Administrative Conference of the United States. On August 9, 2021, his nomination was sent to the United States Senate, but expired. He was renominated on January 4, 2022. On February 2, 2022, his nomination was reported out of the Senate Judiciary Committee and on May 26, 2022, he was confirmed in the Senate by voice vote. He assumed office on May 31, 2022.

== Private practice ==
Fois' private practice includes a partnership in the D.C. office of Venable LLP and works as a solo practitioner. Among his private clients were the National Association of Juvenile and Family Court Judges, the Drug Court Association, a leading civil rights group, a major think tank and many various businesses and trade associations. He was Chief Counsel to the Subcommittee on Crime and Criminal Justice of the Judiciary Committee in the United States House of Representatives helping lead enactment of the Brady bill. From 1985 through 1989 he was an Assistant United States Attorney in the District of Columbia handling trial and appellate cases and serving as the Deputy Chief of the Misdemeanor Division. He has held the position of Senior Fellow at Globalsecurity.org, a national security, web-based think tank. Early in his career he was an assistant state attorney in Miami-Dade County, Florida.

== Media and community ==
Fois has appeared on television and radio as a legal analyst. He has worked as a contributor to the Fox News Channel. He has written and spoken extensively on legal and public policy issues and was a regular columnist for two local papers in Washington, D.C.

His community service includes co-chairing the D.C. Coalition Against Drugs and Violence, a D.C. anti-drug and violence community group. Fuis is active in his parish church serving on its council and in other ministries including the executive committee of the Disabilities Ministry. He serves on the Board of Directors of the Catholic Coalition for Special Education. He has been a DC resident for almost all of the past 37 years.
