= Jonathan Pittman =

American judge (born 1963)

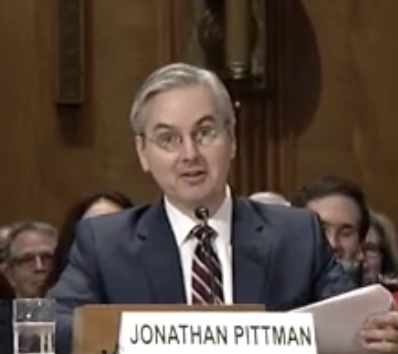

Associate Judge of the Superior Court of the District of Columbia
- In office April 4, 2018 – February 7, 2025
- Appointed by: Donald Trump
- Preceded by: Jeanette J. Clark
- Succeeded by: Stephen F. Rickard

Personal details
- Born: Jonathan Hale Pittman; February 9, 1963 (age 62) New York City, New York, U.S.
- Education: Vassar College (AB); Vanderbilt University (JD)

Jonathan Hale Pittman (born February 9, 1963) is an American lawyer who served as an associate judge of the Superior Court of the District of Columbia. Prior to assuming becoming a judge, he was the assistant deputy attorney general for the Civil Litigation division of the office of the Attorney General for the District of Columbia.

== Education ==
Pittman received his Bachelor of Arts in economics from Vassar College in 1985 and his Juris Doctor from the Vanderbilt University Law School in 1990.

== Career ==
Pittman is a former partner at Crowell & Moring. He clerked for Judge John A. Terry of the District of Columbia Court of Appeals.

=== D.C. superior court ===
In March 2017, Pittman was nominated by President Donald Trump to serve as an associate judge of the Superior Court of the District of Columbia. On September 12, 2017, the Senate Committee on Homeland Security and Governmental Affairs held a hearing on his nomination. On November 9, 2017, he was reported to the Senate floor by the committee. On January 25, 2018, the Senate confirmed his nomination by voice vote. He was sworn in on April 4, 2018. He retired effective February 7, 2025.

Legal offices
Preceded by Jeanette J. Clark	Associate Judge of the Superior Court of the District of Columbia; 2018–2025	Vacant
