= Mark McNulty (politician) =

American politician (born 1944)

Delaware Secretary of Transportation
- In office 1992–1993
- Governor: Dale E. Wolf
- Preceded by: Kermit Justice
- Succeeded by: Anne Canby

Personal details
- Born: Mark Andrew McNulty; November 10, 1944 (age 81) Jersey City, New Jersey, U.S.
- Party: Republican
- Spouse: Barbara Ann née Woznicki (1969–present)
- Children: Christine Anne, Joanne Lynne
- Education: Saint Peter's College; Seton Hall University
- Occupation: Lawyer, former government official

Mark Andrew McNulty (born November 10, 1944), a Seton Hall Law School graduate (JD 1973) and member of the Delaware Bar 1973, served as Secretary of the Department of Transportation in the cabinet of Delaware Governor Dale E. Wolf.
