= Michael Kahn (lawyer) =

American lawyer (born 1949)

Michael Alexander Kahn
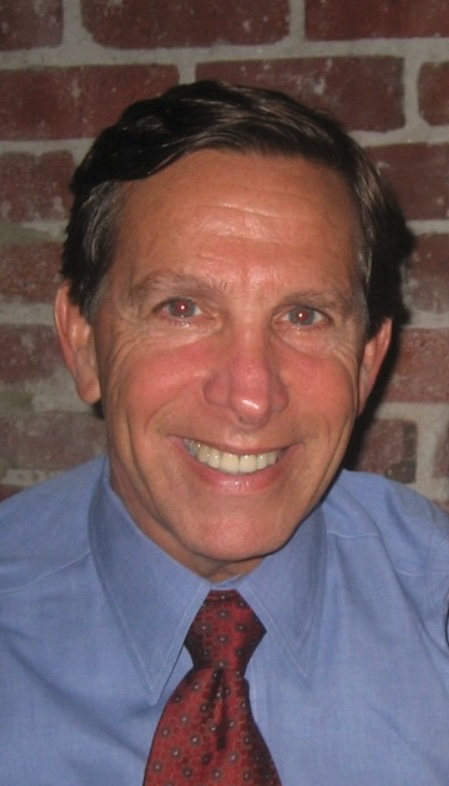
- Born: February 4, 1949 (age 77); Buffalo, New York
- Education: UCLA (BA); Stanford University (JD, MA)
- Occupation: Lawyer

Michael Alexander Kahn (born February 4, 1949) is an American lawyer, government official, legal and political cartoon scholar, and a business leader.

In 2015, Michael Kahn was inducted into the California Trial Lawyer Hall of Fame. In addition to his legal career, Kahn was selected to serve in critical roles by three California Governors—Gray Davis, Arnold Schwarzenegger, and Gavin Newsom—to address two of the greatest crises to face California in the early 21st century: the electricity crisis of 2000–2005 and the wildfire crisis of 2017–2022. During his career, Kahn was appointed to 16 government positions by state and federal officials.

== Early life and education ==
Kahn was born in Buffalo, New York, and attended public schools in California. He attended UCLA from where he graduated magna cum laude and elected to Phi Beta Kappa. Kahn attended Stanford Law School, where he was the Irving Hellman Jr. Scholar, and an editor of the Stanford Law Review. On graduation, Kahn received an JD and an MA in political science.

== Legal career ==
After law school, he clerked for Judge Ben C Duniway on the Ninth Circuit Court of Appeals and thereafter practiced law with four law firms. He tried dozens of cases to verdict in a multiplicity of forums including state and federal courts, American and International arbitral panels, regulatory agencies such as the NLRB and he appeared in numerous appeals in state and federal courts including the Supreme Courts of California and Massachusetts and the Ninth and Sixth circuits. Kahn also represented pro bono clients in landmark search and seizure and capital punishment cases before the California Supreme Court.

== Notable cases ==
- United States v. Stringfellow: Kahn served as lead trial counsel for the three hundred plus generator defendants in one of the largest environmental cases in United States history brought by the United States and the State of California. Kahn's opening statement was later published in the American Bar Association's Litigation Journal and Opening Statements.
- U.S Windpower v. PG&E: Kahn represented an alternative energy provider involving a novel and critical issue in the energy field. Kahn achieved a $17.6 million verdict in favor of the alternative energy provider and established principles limiting the right the utility to curtail power.
- Cisco v. Apple: Kahn represented Cisco against Apple in the famous iPhone copyright case.
- Peoplesoft v. Oracle: Kahn represented Peoplesoft in a hotly-contested case arising out of Oracle's attempted hostile takeover of its then competitor Peoplesoft, which included Kahn's taking the deposition of Larry Ellison. In addition to these cases, Kahn represented many major corporations and public entities in significant lawsuits and disputes. These included representing General Motors in connection with its dispute with Fiat involving the dissolution of their worldwide partnership (General Motors v Fiat), Enterprise Rent a Car in connection with its dispute with Eurpocar involving the dissolution of its worldwide licensing dispute over the National and Alamo Brands, and the University of California in connection with the dispute with the University of Southern California, which resulted in the payment of $50 million to Kahn's client and a public apology issued by USC.

== Government service and appointments ==
- California Energy Crisis: California experienced an extreme energy shortage resulting in blackouts, and a state financial crisis that brought the state to the verge of bankruptcy. Kahn was selected to head California Independent System Operator by Governors Davis and Schwarzenegger and was also appointed to head other agencies and boards to address this crisis including heading the California Clean Energy Green Team set up by the California Legislature. Kahn was quoted in California Energy Markets in 2000 referring to the Green Team.
- During the California insurance crisis of the early 1990s, Kahn worked closely with Commissioner John Garamendi and was appointed to task forces assisting the department.
- Kahn was also appointed by Senator Barbara Boxer and Governors Davis and Schwarzenegger to committees that reviewed judicial appointments.
- California Wild Fires: In February 2019, Kahn was one of five persons appointed to the Commission on Catastrophic Wildfire Cost and Recovery by Governor Gavin Newsom.
- Civil Justice Reform Act Committee appointed by Chief Judge of the Northern District of California Robert Peckham and helped create the early neutral evaluation alternative dispute mechanism that was adopted by courts throughout the country and in England.
- California Independent System Operator (Cal ISO): Chair appointed by Governor Davis.
- California Wildfire Commission
- Senate Commission on Property Tax Equity and Revenue. The commission existed through January 31, 1991, after which a Report of the Senate Commission on Property Tax Equity and Revenue to the California State Senate was published in June 1991.
- Commissioner's Task Force on Unfair Practices and Environmental Liability.
- The California Electricity Oversight Board.

== Political cartoon art collector and scholar ==
On September 19, 2023, the University of California announced that Kahn had donated a substantial portion of his library to the UCLA library in a gift valued at almost five million dollars, which included funding a ten-year interdisciplinary education initiative for the rigorous study of graphic arts as political speech. Previously Kahn funded the Opper Program at Ohio State University, which established a comprehensive system for incorporating political cartoons into high school curriculums. Kahn also sponsored a lecture series at the University of California Davis utilizing political cartoons as a teaching vehicle in secondary education.

== Author ==
Kahn wrote three books regarding political cartoon subjects, delivered dozens of lectures on the subject and participated in exhibits of his works throughout the country including at the New York Historical Society, the Grolier Club in New York, Ohio State University, and the Public Policy Institute of California.

- May It Amuse the Court: Editorial Cartoons of the Supreme Court and Constitution.
- What Fools These Mortals Be!: The Story of Puck; America's First And Most Influential Magazine of Color Political Cartoon.
- Political Cartoons and Caricatures from the Collection of Michael Alexander Kahn.

== Other roles ==
Kahn served on the board of directors of numerous non-profit organizations for over forty years. Principal among these activities include his service as President of the Coro Foundation of Northern California, President of President Lincoln's Cottage in Washington, D.C., Chair of the Stanford Law Fund, Trustee of the Governor Gray Davis papers as well as serving on the board or committees of the American Law Institute, The Center for the Study of the Presidency and Congress, The Stanford Law School, UCSF Foundation, The Legal Aid Society of San Francisco, and The Lincoln Presidential Foundation. Kahn founded the Judge Ben C. Duniway Memorial Scholarship Fund at Stanford University.

== Business and non-profit leader ==
During the mad cow disease crisis of the 1980s and 1990s, Kahn partnered with Nobel Prize winner Stanley Pruisiner to form a biotech company to combat mad cow disease. Prusiner documented the crisis in his book, Madness and Memory: The Discovery of Prions—A New Biological Principle of Disease. Pruisiner won the Nobel Prize for the identification of prions, which are the cause of mad cow disease. In addition to this business activity, Kahn served on board of directors of companies involved in grape growing, liquid environmental waste, and litigation finance, and he served as a principal outside advisor for a tier-one auto supplier. He is currently one of four board members in charge of liquidating the assets of Silicon Valley Bank Financial Group as a result of its emergence from one of the largest financial collapses of the 21st century.
