= Murder of Charles Flynn =

1989 murder in Florida, United States

Charles Lambert Flynn
- Charles Flynn
- Born: August 23, 1966
- Died: April 4, 1989 (aged 22); Brevard County, Florida, US
- Other name: Chip

On April 4, 1989, 22-year-old Charles Lambert "Chip" Flynn was killed in Brevard County, Florida, United States. Flynn died from a gunshot wound. His ex-girlfriend Kim Hallock claims that an African-American man named Crosley Alexander Green was responsible for Flynn's death. Green was found guilty of Flynn's murder and placed on death row. He was eventually removed from death row. After having his conviction vacated by federal court in 2018, Green was released from prison on house arrest, pending the 11th Circuit Court of Appeals decision to either retry or overturn his conviction based on the prosecutors withholding evidence in his original trial. Green's conviction was reinstated in March 2022.

== Background ==
Before the killing, Flynn had just exited a relationship with Kim Hallock. Hallock was hurt by the split. Flynn was also living with his parents and was in a new relationship. Green was a minor drug dealer who had just been recently released from Madison Correctional Institution having been convicted of robbery. He was also the carer for his family after his parents died.

== Killing ==
On April 3, 1989, around 10:00, Hallock encountered Charles Flynn at her house. They would later drive to a park in Mims, Florida where they would smoke marijuana and have sex. Later at the local baseball field, Holder Park, Hallock and Flynn were sitting in his truck, when Hallock says she notified Flynn of Crosley Green's presence, to which, she says, he rolled up the windows. According to Hallock, Green was armed at the time. Hallock would also take out the gun in the glove compartment and place it near her. Green then reportedly tied Flynn's hands with a shoelace, forced Hallock to give him money and drove them to a Florida citrus grove, all while holding a gun on Hallock and Flynn. Hallock stated that they were robbed at 11:00 and taken to the grove in Flynn's truck at 12:10. Hallock asserted that Flynn attempted to plead with Green, asking that he let Hallock go. She said that Green forced them to keep their heads down as he drove, and that while crouching she attempted to untie Flynn's restraints.

By Hallock's account, after they reached the grove Green removed Hallock from the truck and verbally abused her, such as calling her a slut. According to her statement, Flynn, hands still tied, retrieved the gun from the car and fired "five or six gunshots." Hallock, unaware if Flynn shot Green, fled the scene; driving three miles, past a hospital, a pay phone, the house she shared with her parents and other houses before arriving to the house of a friend of Flynn's—David Stroup—to call for help.

=== 911 call and police investigation ===
Around 40 minutes after fleeing the scene, Hallock called the police at 01:13. The officers dispatched to the scene were two Brevard County officers, sergeant Diane Clark and deputy Mark Rixey. Due to the unclear directions given by Hallock, it took them 30 minutes to find Flynn; they initially went to the wrong location. Clarke had sent another deputy to gain relevant information from her, in response to which she was reportedly uncooperative.

Upon arriving at the grove, Clarke and Rixey found Flynn. His hands were tied, and he had a single gunshot wound to the chest. The first words he said to them were "Get me outta here. I wanna go home." At no point did he mention a robbery or an assailant. During two separate occasions Flynn stopped breathing while they waited for an ambulance. Clarke, in response, tried to resuscitate him. Flynn died before the ambulance arrived. (Note: A report by CBS in 1999 stated that he was pronounced dead at the hospital.) Flynn's parents soon arrived at the scene, but police did not let them intervene.

At the scene, there was no obvious evidence of a third party. Only fingerprints belonging to Hallock and Flynn were discovered, the only gun found was the one belonging to Flynn, no gunshot residue was seen on Flynn's hands, and the only bullet found was the one that killed him, which may have originated from his own gun.

== Arrest, trials and investigations ==
=== Police search for suspect and arrest ===
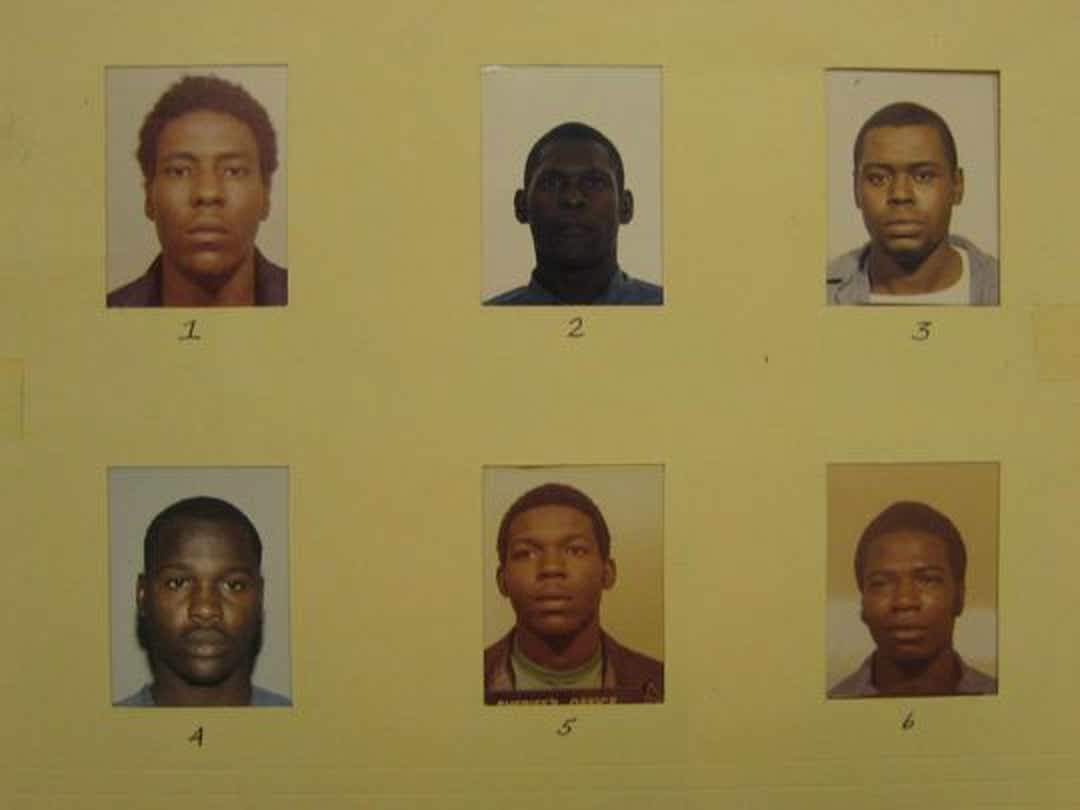
A photo of the lineup shown to Hallock. Green's photo is number 2.

After Hallock gave a recorded statement to police in which she identified the assailant as a black man and after receiving a tip from a friend of Flynn's—Tim Curtis—the police's prime suspect became Green. Curtis would later admit to lying about knowing Green to be the killer.

Hallock was later shown a photo lineup of six photos (Green included). Green's photo was smaller and darker than the other pictures and positioned so "that your eyes are normally drawn to are right in the middle", according to Green's appellate attorney. Despite Hallock only being "pretty sure" Green was the suspect she managed to identify him. Green was arrested on June 8, 1989, and charged with kidnapping, robbery and murder.

=== Initial trial: 1989-1990 ===
During the trial, which took place from August to September 1989, prosecutors displayed shoeprints which they attributed to Green. Assistant State's Attorney Christopher White, who put forward the claim, stated that a police dog alerted them of the scent of those prints and they tracked that scent to the vicinity of a house where Crosley Green sometimes stayed. According to Green's first appellate attorneys, White could not produce any evidence of these claims, and no fingerprints, fibers, hair or blood originating from Green were found at the scene. The attorneys also said that the shoeprints were later found to be one size larger than Green wore, and the shoeprint did not match the actual shoe tread found at the scene. It would later be revealed that exculpatory evidence had not been turned over to the defense, a potential violation of the defendant's Brady rights.

Later on in the trial, prosecutors put forward three witnesses who claimed Crosley had confessed to them. One of the accusers was Crosley Green's own sister, Sheila Green. Sheila would later recant her statement, saying that she was pressured to commit perjury by police who threatened to never let her see her children again. The other accusers shared similar stories, as they also recanted later on. One witness in support of Green was put forward.

Green was offered a plea deal in which he would admit guilt and receive no more than 22 years. He refused to take the deal, asserting that he did not kill Charles Flynn. On September 5, 1990, after 3 hours of deliberation, the all-white jury found Green guilty of first-degree murder; he was later sentenced to death. In 2019, the U.S. Middle District Court of Florida deemed this ruling to be unconstitutional.

=== Proposed second trial: 1993-1994 ===
In April 1993, Defense attorney Rob Parker filed a motion for a new trial. This motion was denied, as Green's conviction was upheld by the Florida Supreme Court in 1994.

=== Private investigation: 1999 ===
In the early summer of 1999, Chicago investigator Paul Ciolino and four other investigators began to review the case (without pay) and interview witnesses, jurors, and others connected to the case, per request of Nan Webb, a Viera housewife and anti-death penalty activist. They had previously made contact with Webb in 1996. Ciolino would meet with Assistant State's Attorney Christopher White and Brevard County Sheriff Phil Williams to discuss the case and aid in the investigation. Ciolino and the investigators discovered evidence discounting the shoeprints and witness testimonies, (Note: Further details on this evidence is provided in the initial trial section.) and also learned that the truck which Green reportedly hijacked was a manual stick, which Green could not drive. Due to this evidence, the investigators were able to instigate an independent state investigation of the case.

=== State investigation: 2000 ===
In 2000, the state of Florida conducted their own investigation. In the investigation, they tested new items for the possibility of DNA. A report from CBS in the same year stated that no DNA evidence had been found that connected Green to the murder. Later reports, however, found that weak DNA evidence found in the truck could have possibly originated with Green or a member of his family. This evidence has been suggested to belong to Green's brother, O'Connor, a friend of Tim Curtis, who in turn was the previous owner of the vehicle.

=== Continued appeals: 2002-2011 ===
In 2002, Green's attorneys continued to appeal his case, hoping to win a new trial. In 2003, Green was given a hearing by Florida Judge Bruce Jacobus. In 2005, Green's death sentence was thrown out. This appeal was challenged by the Florida Supreme Court in June 2007. In October of that year, the Florida Supreme Court upheld Green's conviction but stated that he should be resentenced. Green received a life sentence the following year. In 2010, Green's attorneys again petitioned for a new trial. This petition was ultimately denied in 2011 despite two new alibi witnesses being brought forward.

=== Third trial: 2016-2019 ===
In January 2016, a petition for a new trial was declined due to allegedly missing a deadline. Later that year, Green's attorneys filed a motion for a new trial, arguing that there existed evidence of prosecutorial misconduct. U.S. District Judge Roy Dalton Jr. denied the claim, saying it was time-barred. In 2017, Green's attorneys won an appeal with the 11th Circuit Court of Appeals, stating that Dalton's ruling was illegitimate because of a technicality. In 2018, Green was given a new trial due to prosecutor Christopher White withholding evidence from Green's main attorneys. This trial was appealed by the State of Florida and ultimately halted. In December 2019, Florida Today reported that Green had won a new trial. They later reported that this trial was appealed.

=== 2020 ruling ===
On March 12, 2020, Green's and state attorneys discussed with the US Court of Appeals if the lower court order for a new trial will be upheld. Green's case was expected to be reviewed by a panel of the 11th Circuit, U. S. Court of Appeals sometime in late 2020.

== Claims of innocence ==
Crosley Alexander Green
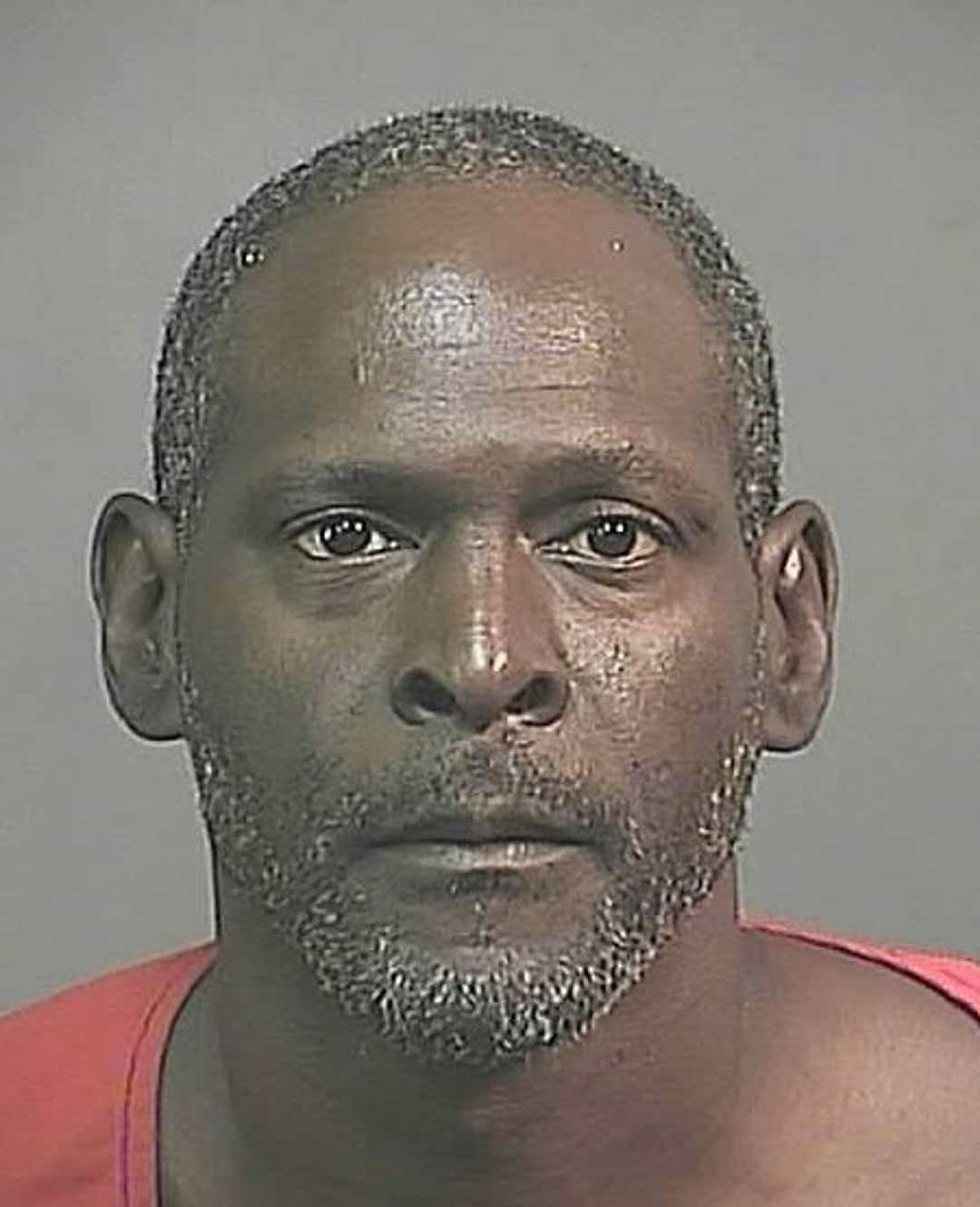
- Crosley Green
- Born: September 11, 1957 (age 69)
- Criminal charges: First-Degree murder
- Penalty: Death; commuted to life imprisonment with the possibility of parole

Details
- Imprisoned at: Tomoka Correctional Institution
- Relatives: 7

Since his arrest, Green has repeatedly declared his innocence. Upon being questioned by police for the murder of Flynn, Green stated that he watched a baseball game at Holder Park and was at his girlfriend's house and a party on the night in question. Green again restated his innocence in interviews conduct by CBS News in 2015 and 2020. Since his conviction, Green's attorneys have found alibi witnesses willing to corroborate Green's story. Assistant State's Attorney Christopher White however raised questions of their credibility. In 2020 Defense attorney Jeane Thomas stated that there exists at least eight alibi witnesses who can support Green being at the party.

Many other people have come out in support of Green as well. Paul Ciolino, a private investigator hired to prove Green's innocence, believes that he is, in fact, innocent and that "Crosley Green is systematic of the problem we have with the death penalty with this country". Tim Curtis, who first accused Green of being the killer, is now convinced of his innocence. Private detective Joe Moura also believes Green to be innocent. Stating that there is no evidence to tie Green to the murder, Seth Miller, who leads the Innocence Project of Florida, has stated that there is "clear evidence of [Green's] innocence".

Sergeant. J. Wallace of Hardee Correctional Institution, while not calling Green innocent, did state that he doesn't think "Mr. Green poses any threat to society".

Green's remaining family has come out in support of him.

=== Inconsistencies in the proposed story ===
Many questions have arisen regarding the story put forward by police. One focus is on Green's ability to drive the car while holding Hallock and Flynn at gunpoint. Ciolino further elaborated on this point by saying:

"Crosley Green, who allegedly abducts [these] people in this truck, drives this truck, shifts this truck, turns the lights on in the truck, is touching the glass on the truck, is touching the right fender, touching the left fender; there is no fingerprints, there is no footprints...Unless Crosley Green is Casper the ghost in disguise, then he couldn't have committed this crime."

Curtis shared a similar sentiment, saying that "You cannot get in that truck and take off without it stalling," and that "You had to grab the truck literally to climb up in it. It wasn't like an automobile. You had to open the door and climb up in it. You couldn't do it without putting your hands on the truck. Impossible." During Ciolino's investigation, he raised more questions, asking, "How could you come out of this truck with your hands tied behind your back, firing a weapon?". Rob Parker, Green's defense attorney, also questioned how Hallock would've been able to identify Green when the scene was pitch black, and Hallock saw him for no more than 30 seconds.

Significantly, the story which Hallock gave to police had several inconsistencies and subsequent alterations to it. In her statement to police, Hallock described Green as having long, Jheri-curled hair which covered his ears. Green at the time had a buzz cut. She described the gun allegedly used by Green as a semi-automatic despite no shell casing being found at the scene. She reported that Green made her tie Flynn's hands, then later claimed that Green did the tying by himself. She reported hearing five to six gunshots, yet the only bullet found was in the victim's chest, and no shell casings were recovered.

==== Suspicion over Kim Hallock ====
Kim Hallock was never treated as a suspect, and as such never underwent basic procedures such as being checked for gunshot residue, being photographed for injuries, or having her clothes collected. The first responders, Police officers Diane Clarke and Mark Rixey, believe her to likely be responsible for Flynn's death. Clarke and Rixely have noted Hallock's behavior after the shooting, the lack of physical evidence tying Green to the crime scene, the only bullet found at the scene and Flynn's comments upon their arrival. (Note: See: 911 call and police investigation for further information on the bullet and Flynn's comments.) Assistant State's Attorney Christopher White denied these claims but admits that further examination could have been done.

Both White and Clarke have suggested that possibility of the shooting being an accident committed by Hallock, followed by a cover story concocted by her and her erstwhile boyfriend.
