= United States Department of Justice Office of Legislative Affairs =

United States Federal Government office

- Seal of the United States Department of Justice

Office overview
- Jurisdiction: Federal government of the United States
- Headquarters: Robert F. Kennedy Department of Justice Building 950 Pennsylvania Avenue NW Washington, D.C., United States
- Office executive: Patrick D. Davis, Assistant Attorney General
- Parent department: U.S. Department of Justice
- Website: Official website

The Office of Legislative Affairs is a senior management office within the United States Department of Justice. Its responsibility is for the development and implementation of strategies to advance the department's legislative initiatives and other interests relating to Congress.

== List of assistant attorneys general for legislative affairs ==
- Patrick D. Davis (October 16, 2025 – Present)
- Dario Camacho (February 19, 2025 – July 2025)
- Patrick D. Davis (January 20, 2025 – February 19, 2025; acting)
- Carlos Uriarte (August 15, 2022 – January 20, 2025)
- Peter Hyun (November 22, 2021 – August 15, 2022; acting)
- Helaine Greenfeld (January 20, 2021 – November 22, 2021; acting)
- Stephen Boyd (September 5, 2017 – January 20, 2021)
- Peter J. Kadzik (June 2014 – January 20, 2017)
- Judith C. Appelbaum (June 13, 2012 – March 2013)
- Ronald H. Weich (April 29, 2009 – April 25, 2012)
- Richard Hertling (2003 – 2007; acting)
- Daniel J. Bryant (2001 – 2003)
- Robert Raben (October 7, 1999 – January 20, 2001)
- Jon Jennings (1998 – October 7, 1999; acting)
- Andrew Fois (1995-1998)
- Sheila F. Anthony (1993-1995)
- W. Lee Rawls (1990-1993)
- Carol T. Crawford (1989-1990)
- Thomas Boyd (1988-1989)
- John R. Bolton (December 15, 1985 – July 27, 1988)
- Robert A. McConnell (1981 – 1985)
- Patricia Wald (1977 – 1979)
- Michael Uhlmann (1975 – 1977)
- Mitch McConnell (February 1, 1975 - June 27, 1975; acting)
- W. Vincent Rakestraw (March 3, 1974 – February 1, 1975)
- Mike McKevitt (1973)
