= Hispanic National Bar Association =

- Founded: March 20, 1972; 54 years ago
- Type: Legal society
- Tax ID no.: 52-1333974
- Legal status: 501(c)(6) professional association
- Headquarters: Washington, D.C., United States
- National President: Carlos M. Bollar
- Chief operating officer and executive director: Alba Cruz-Hacker
- Revenue: $1,507,724 (2014)
- Expenses: $1,242,678 (2014)
- Employees: 3 (2013)
- Volunteers: 250 (2013)
- Website: Official website

The Hispanic National Bar Association (HNBA) is a 501(c)(6) organization representing Hispanics in the legal profession, including attorneys, judges, law professors, legal assistant and paralegals, and law students in the United States and its territories.

== History ==
The organization was founded in California on March 20, 1972, as La Raza National Lawyers Association; its first president was Mario G. Obledo. Mari Carmen Aponte served as the organization’s first female president from 1983 to 1984. The organization's name was changed to Hispanic National Bar Association and it was reincorporated in the District of Columbia in 1984.

== Purpose ==
The Hispanic National Bar Association (HNBA) is an incorporated, not-for-profit, national membership association that represents the interests of over 67,000+ Hispanic attorneys, judges, law professors, legal assistants, law students, and legal professionals in the United States and its territories.

== Activities ==
The HNBA holds an Annual Corporate Counsel Conference and Moot Court Competition as well as an Annual Convention, an Annual Legislative Day and an Annual International Conference open to all attorneys and affiliates from around the country. Each year, the HNBA also organizes a variety of events for lawyers and law students throughout its 19 regions, and several community outreach and education initiatives.

The HNBA sometimes condemns rhetoric that it perceives as "divisive and racist" and aimed at immigrants. For example, in response to Donald Trump's comments regarding illegal immigration from Mexico to the United States, and Trump's derogatory remarks about some of those immigrants, the group's president issued a press release in July 2015 calling for a boycott of all Donald Trump–owned businesses. Subsequently, in 2016, Trump criticized a member of the HNBA, Judge Gonzalo P. Curiel, and the President of the HNBA issued a statement defending Curiel.

== List of past presidents ==
Past presidents of the HNBA are as follows:

- Mario G. Obledo, 1972–1977
- Benjamin Aranda III, 1977–1980
- John Roy Castillo, 1980–1981
- Robert Maes, 1981–1982
- Lorenzo Arredondo, 1982–1983
- Mari Carmen Aponte, 1983–1984
- Gilbert F. Casellas, 1984–1985
- Robert Mendez, 1985–1986
- William Mendez, 1986–1987
- Michael Martinez, 1987–1988
- Mark Gallegos, 1988–1989
- Jimmy Gurule, 1989–1990
- Robert J. Ruiz, 1990–1991
- Dolores Atencio, 1991–1992
- Carlos Ortiz, 1992–1993
- Wilfredo Caraballo, 1993–1994
- Mary T. Hernandez, 1994–1995
- Jose Gaitan, 1995–1996
- Hugo Chaviano, 1996–1997
- Gregory Vega, 1997–1998
- Lillian Apodaca, 1998–1999
- Alice Velazquez, 1999–2000
- Rico Rafael Santiago, 2000–2001
- Angel G. Gomez, 2001–2002
- Duard D. Bradshaw, 2002–2003
- Carlos Singh, 2003–2004
- Alan Varela, 2004–2005
- Nelson A. Castillo, 2005–2006
- Jimmie V. Reyna, 2006–2007
- Victor M. Marquez, 2007–2008
- Ramona E. Romero, 2008–2009
- Roman D. Hernandez, 2009–2010
- Diana Sen, 2010–2011
- Benny Agosto, Jr., 2011–2012
- Peter M. Reyes, Jr., 2012–2013
- Miguel Alexander Pozo, 2013–2014
- Cynthia D. Mares, 2014–2015
- Robert T. Maldonado, 2015–2016
- Pedro Torres-Díaz, 2016–2017
- Erica V. Mason, 2017–2018
- Jennifer Salinas, 2018–2019
- Irene Oria, 2019–2020
- Elia Diaz-Yaeger, 2020–2021
