= Kelly O. Hayes =

American attorney

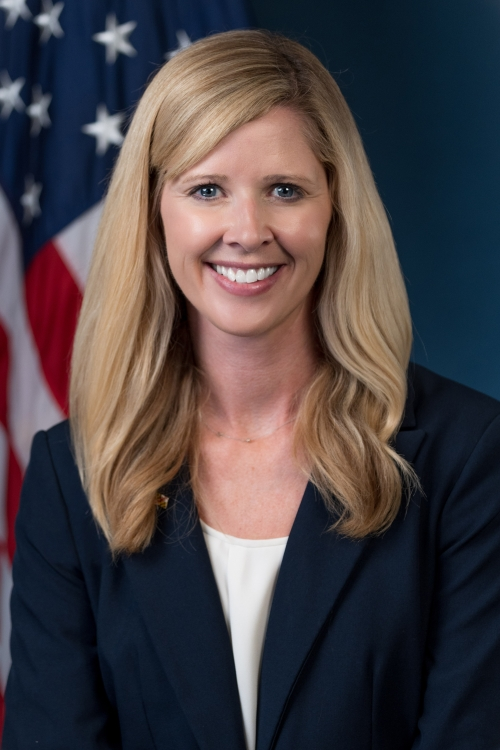
- Official portrait, 2025

United States Attorney for the District of Maryland
- Incumbent
- Assumed office March 3, 2025; Interim: March 3, 2025 – June 25, 2025
- President: Donald Trump
- Preceded by: Phil Selden

Personal details
- Education: University of Maryland, College Park (UG); University of North Carolina at Chapel Hill (JD)

Kelly O'Connell Hayes is an American attorney who has served as the United States Attorney for the District of Maryland since 2025.

== Early life and education ==
Hayes was raised in Montgomery County, Maryland.

Hayes received an undergraduate degree from the University of Maryland, College Park and a Juris Doctor degree from the University of North Carolina at Chapel Hill. After law school, she clerked for Judge Janis L. Sammartino of the United States District Court for the Southern District of California.

== Career ==
Hayes joined the U.S. Attorney's Office for the District of Maryland as a prosecutor in May 2013, after the end of a federal hiring freeze. Since 2025, she has served as United States Attorney for Maryland. From March 3, 2025 to June 25, 2025, Hayes served as U.S. Attorney in an interim capacity. On June 25, 2025, Hayes was appointed by the United States District Court for the District of Maryland as U.S. Attorney in a permanent capacity, as allowed by statute.

She has led investigations against Adam Schiff and John Bolton, leading to the latter's prosecution.
