= Prosecution of John Bolton =

2025 Criminal case in Maryland, U.S.

United States v. Bolton
- Court: United States District Court for the District of Maryland
- Full case name: United States of America v. John R. Bolton
- Charge: Unlawful transmission of national defense information (8 counts); Unlawful retention of national defense information (10 counts)

Court membership
- Judge sitting: Theodore D. Chuang

On October 16, 2025, John Bolton, a former United States national security advisor, was indicted by a federal grand jury in Maryland on 18 charges related to the mishandling of classified documents. The indictment includes eight counts of unlawful transmission of national defense information and ten counts of unlawful retention of national defense information. The charges allege that Bolton used a personal email account and messaging application to transmit sensitive documents and retained classified materials at his Maryland residence and Washington, D.C., office. FBI agents executed search warrants in August 2025, seizing documents marked as classified. Through his attorney, Bolton has denied any wrongdoing. On June 26, 2026, Bolton pled guilty.

== Background ==
In June 2020, John Bolton published The Room Where It Happened, a tell-all memoir describing his time as national security advisor in the first Trump administration from 2018 to 2019. Before publication, the National Security Council (NSC) conducted a prepublication review to check for classified information. While an NSC official informed Bolton that revisions had been completed, final approval was not issued before the book went to print.

The Justice Department filed a civil lawsuit seeking to prevent the book’s release, arguing it contained classified information. Federal Judge Royce Lamberth denied granting an injunction to block publication, citing the distribution of advance copies, but noted that Bolton had proceeded without final authorization and may have "gambled with the national security of the United States".

== Investigation ==
=== Grand jury inquiry ===
On September 15, 2020, multiple sources reported that the Justice Department had opened a criminal investigation into whether John Bolton unlawfully disclosed classified information in his memoir The Room Where It Happened. A federal grand jury was convened to examine potential violations related to the disclosure of national defense information.

According to The New York Times, subpoenas were issued for communications records from Bolton’s publisher, Simon & Schuster, and his literary agency, the Javelin Agency. The inquiry was initiated after the Office of the Director of National Intelligence referred the matter to the Justice Department, and John Demers, then head of the department’s National Security Division, authorized the investigation.

Bolton denied any wrongdoing. His attorney, Charles J. Cooper, stated that Bolton “emphatically rejects any claim that he acted improperly, let alone criminally,” and that he would cooperate with investigators.

=== Hacking investigation ===
In the summer of 2021, federal authorities reportedly began an investigation into the hacking of Bolton's personal email account by foreign individuals or a foreign entity, alleged to be linked to Iran. According to the indictment, a representative for Bolton reported to the FBI in July 2021 that the hack occurred between 2019 and 2021 and that the hackers had threatened to leak the contents of Bolton's emails. However, Bolton did not at that time inform authorities "that the hackers now held this [classified] information".

=== Raid on Bolton's home and office ===
On August 22, 2025, FBI agents executed court-authorized search warrants at John Bolton’s residence in Bethesda, Maryland, and his Washington, D.C., office as part of a federal investigation into the handling of classified materials. The searches were approved by federal magistrate judges in Maryland and Washington, D.C., following intelligence provided by CIA Director John Ratcliffe to FBI Director Kash Patel.

According to court documents released the following month, agents seized multiple electronic devices, folders labeled "Trump I–IV," and a binder titled "Statements and Reflections to Allied Strikes". The warrant authorized the seizure of any physical or digital records that appeared to contain classified information or related to Bolton’s former duties as national security advisor.

The investigation reportedly examined whether Bolton retained or mishandled classified documents and whether any of the materials were used in media leaks. A source familiar with the search told NBC News that it stemmed from a criminal inquiry initially opened during the Biden administration but not pursued at the time.

Officials including FBI Director Kash Patel and Attorney General Pam Bondi stated publicly that "no one is above the law" and that the operation was conducted for national security reasons, while some commentators and Bolton associates suggested the search was politically motivated. Bolton did not publicly comment immediately after the raid, and his attorney maintained that he had complied with all classification and security requirements.

== Indictment ==
=== Early speculation ===
In mid-October 2025, multiple media outlets reported that the United States Department of Justice was expected to ask a federal grand jury in Maryland to indict former national security adviser John Bolton.

According to CNN, the lead prosecutor overseeing the case arrived at the federal courthouse in Greenbelt, Maryland, on October 16 to meet with the grand jury, which had been in session throughout the morning. The investigation centered on whether Bolton unlawfully retained or mishandled classified information, including notes he wrote to himself in an AOL email account resembling diary entries during his time in the first Trump administration.

Court documents and reporting from Reuters indicated that FBI agents executed search warrants at Bolton's Maryland home and Washington, D.C., office in August 2025, seizing documents labeled secret, confidential, and classified - including some referencing weapons of mass destruction. Agents also seized cell phones, folders labeled "Trump I–IV," and a binder titled "Statements and Reflections to Allied Strikes". According to the same filing, Bolton's email account had previously been hacked by a foreign entity, though details were redacted.

Bolton's attorney, Abbe Lowell, stated that his client had done nothing improper with classified materials. Some internal Justice Department officials reportedly expressed concern that the case was being expedited under political pressure from the administration, though prosecutors later indicated they were prepared to proceed after reviewing the evidence.

The possible indictment came amid a wider pattern of cases brought against Trump critics, including former FBI director James Comey and New York attorney general Letitia James, which were initiated by Trump appointed prosecutors such as Lindsey Halligan, the U.S. attorney in Virginia. The New York Times has noted however that there was no "handpicked prosecutor" in the Bolton case, and that "the prosecution followed normal department channels, without firings, strong-arm orders from the White House, or forced transfers."

=== Indictment ===
On October 16, 2025, Bolton was indicted by a federal grand jury in the District of Maryland on charges related to the mishandling of classified documents. The indictment, signed by United States attorney Kelly O. Hayes, includes eight counts of unlawful transmission of national defense information and ten counts of unlawful retention of national defense information, all illegal under the Espionage Act of 1917. Prosecutors allege that Bolton used a personal email account and messaging application to transmit sensitive documents and retained classified materials at his Maryland residence and Washington, D.C., office. FBI agents executed search warrants at these locations in August 2025, seizing documents marked as classified. Bolton has denied any wrongdoing through his attorney. The case will be heard by Judge Theodore D. Chuang. Bolton is the third Trump critic after Comey and James to be indicted since September 2025.

=== Arrest and arraignment ===
On October 17, 2025, Bolton surrendered to authorities at a courthouse in Greenbelt, Maryland. While appearing before US magistrate judge Timothy Sullivan, Bolton pled not guilty to an 18-count indictment. Bolton is the third Trump critic after Comey and James to be indicted since September 2025, however unlike with the other two, the DOJ's criminal investigation into Bolton "gained momentum in the Biden administration" according to The New York Times.

=== November 21, 2025 hearing ===
Both the prosecution and defense proposed that discovery would continue through May 2026, given the volume of documents taken from Bolton's home and office which the Justice Department was reviewing. The Justice Department suggested that Bolton could face additional charges. Judge Chuang said it seemed to him that discovery should proceed faster than that.

=== June 26, 2026 guilty plea ===
On June 26, 2026, Bolton pled guilty to a single charge of illegally retaining classified information.
