= John Bolton =

American attorney and diplomat (born 1948)

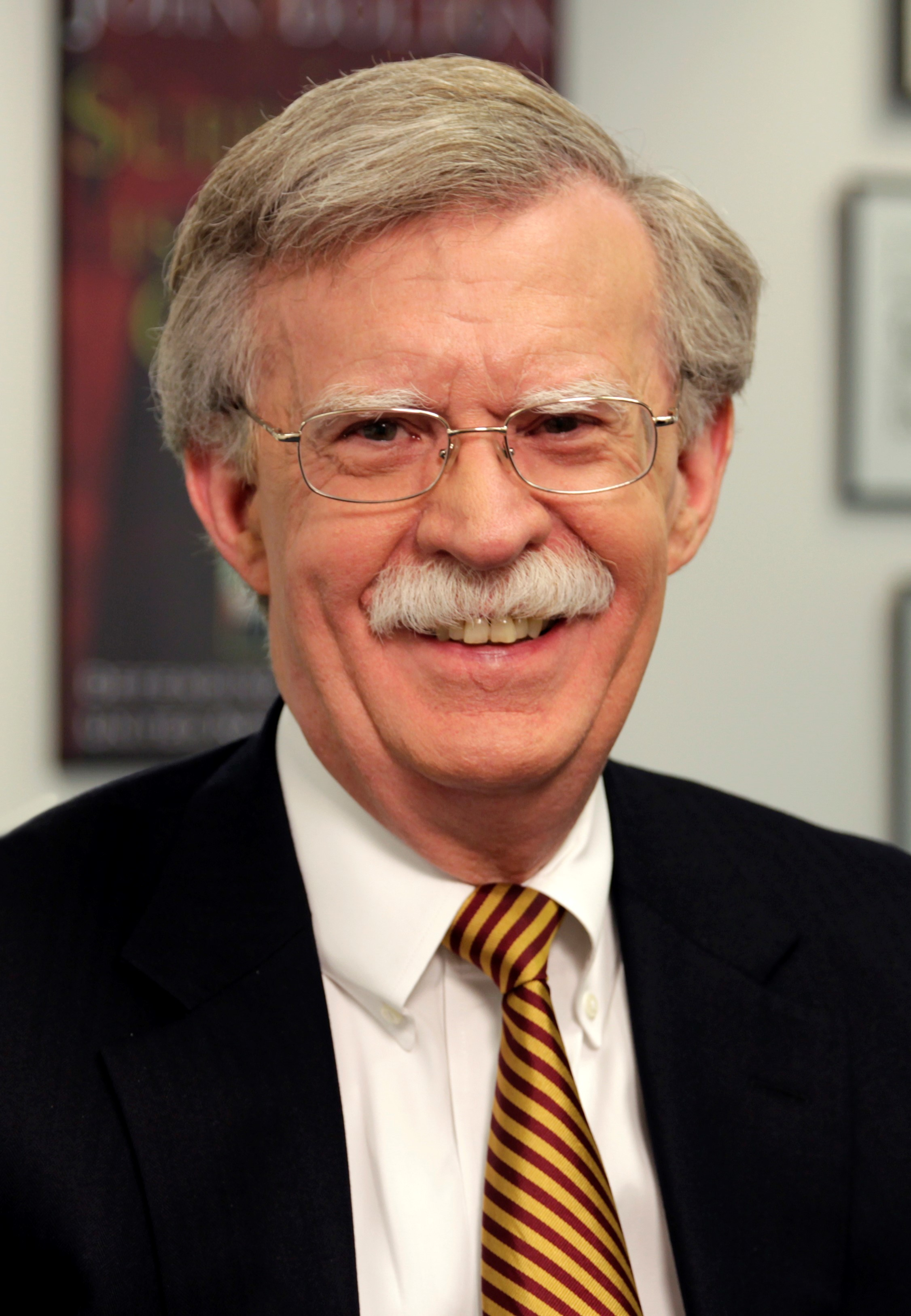
- 2018 Official Portrait

26th United States National Security Advisor
- In office April 9, 2018 – September 10, 2019
- President: Donald Trump
- Deputy: Nadia Schadlow; Ricky L. Waddell; Mira Ricardel; Charles Kupperman
- Preceded by: H. R. McMaster
- Succeeded by: Robert C. O'Brien

25th United States Ambassador to the United Nations
- In office August 2, 2005 – December 31, 2006
- President: George W. Bush
- Preceded by: John Danforth
- Succeeded by: Zalmay Khalilzad
Other Administration positions
13th Under Secretary of State for Arms Control and International Security Affairs
In office May 11, 2001 – July 31, 2005
President	George W. Bush
Preceded by	John D. Holum
Succeeded by	Robert Joseph
18th Assistant Secretary of State for International Organization Affairs
In office May 22, 1989 – January 20, 1993
President	George H. W. Bush
Preceded by	Richard S. Williamson
Succeeded by	Douglas J. Bennet
United States Assistant Attorney General for the Civil Division
In office July 27, 1988 – January 20, 1989
President	Ronald Reagan
Preceded by	Richard K. Willard
Succeeded by	Stuart M. Gerson
United States Assistant Attorney General for the Office of Legislative Affairs
In office December 12, 1985 – July 27, 1988
President	Ronald Reagan
Preceded by	Robert McConnell
Succeeded by	Thomas Boyd
Assistant Administrator of USAID for Program and Policy Coordination
In office August 2, 1982 – December 30, 1983
President	Ronald Reagan
Preceded by	Alexander Shakow
Succeeded by	Richard Derham

Personal details
- Born: John Robert Bolton; November 20, 1948 (age 78) Baltimore, Maryland, U.S.
- Party: Republican
- Spouses: Christine Bolton (m. 1972; div. 1983) Gretchen Smith (m. 1986)
- Children: 1
- Education: Yale University (BA, JD)
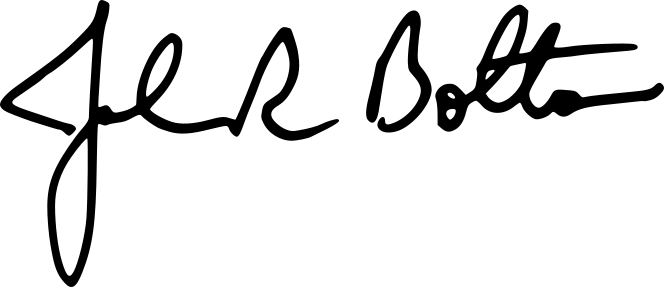
- Signature

Military service
- Allegiance: United States
- Branch/service: United States Army: United States Army Reserve; Maryland Army National Guard
- Years of service: 1970–1976
- Bolton's voice Bolton discussing the Hong Kong protests Recorded August 14, 2019

John Robert Bolton (born November 20, 1948) is an American attorney, diplomat, Republican consultant, and political commentator. He served as the 25th United States ambassador to the United Nations from 2005 to 2006, and as the 26th United States national security advisor from 2018 to 2019.

Bolton also acted as a United States assistant attorney general for President Ronald Reagan from 1985 to 1989. He served in the State Department as the assistant secretary of state for international organization affairs from 1989 to 1993, and the under secretary of state for arms control and international security affairs from 2001 to 2005. He was an advocate of the Iraq War as a director of the Project for the New American Century, which favored going to war with Iraq.

He was the U.S. ambassador to the United Nations from August 2005 to December 2006, as a recess appointee by President George W. Bush. He stepped down at the end of his recess appointment in December 2006 because he was unlikely to win confirmation in the Senate, of which the Democratic Party had control at the time. Bolton later served as National Security Advisor to President Donald Trump from April 2018 to September 2019. He repeatedly called for the termination of the Iran nuclear deal, from which the U.S. withdrew in May 2018. He wrote a best-selling book about his tenure in the Trump administration, The Room Where It Happened, published in 2020.

Bolton is widely considered a foreign policy hawk and advocates military action and regime change by the U.S. in Iran, Syria, Libya, Venezuela, Cuba, Yemen, and North Korea. A member of the Republican Party, his political views have been described as American nationalist, conservative, and neoconservative, although Bolton rejects the last term. He is a former senior fellow at the American Enterprise Institute (AEI) and a Fox News Channel commentator. He was a foreign policy adviser to 2012 Republican presidential nominee Mitt Romney. In October 2025, Bolton was indicted on eight counts of unlawful transmission and ten counts of unlawful retention of national defense information between 2018 and 2025. On June 26, 2026, Bolton pled guilty to one count.

In 2022, Iranian IRGC member Shahram Poursafi was charged with attempting to hire individuals in the United States to assassinate Bolton.

== Early life ==
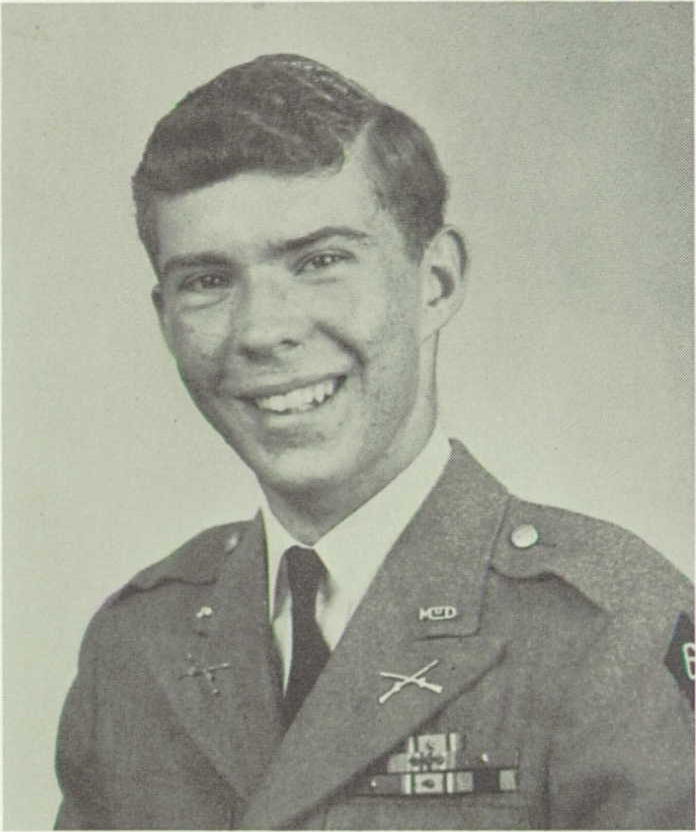
Bolton in McDonogh School's 1966 yearbook

Bolton was born on November 20, 1948, in Baltimore, Maryland, the son of Virginia Clara "Ginny" (née Godfrey), a housewife, and Edward Jackson "Jack" Bolton, a Baltimore fireman. He grew up in the working-class neighborhood of Yale Heights, and won a scholarship to the McDonogh School in Owings Mills, Maryland, graduating in 1966. He also ran the school's Students For Goldwater campaign in 1964.

Bolton attended Yale College, earning a Bachelor of Arts and graduating summa cum laude in 1970. He was a member of the Yale Political Union. He attended Yale Law School from 1971 to 1974, where he shared classes and student housing with his friend Clarence Thomas, earning a Juris Doctor in 1974.

In 1972, Bolton was a summer intern for Vice President Spiro Agnew. He was hired for the position by David Keene.

=== Vietnam War ===
Bolton was a supporter of the Vietnam War, but avoided combat through a student deferment followed by enlistment in the Maryland National Guard. During the 1969 Vietnam War draft lottery, Bolton drew number 185. (Draft numbers were randomly assigned to birth dates; someone born on December 31 could have received Number 1. Numbers 1 to 195 were eventually called up.) As a result of the Johnson and Nixon administrations' decisions to rely largely on the draft rather than on the reserve forces, joining a Guard or Reserve unit became a way to reduce the chances of service in Vietnam.

Before graduating from Yale College in 1970, Bolton enlisted in the Maryland Army National Guard rather than waiting to find out if his draft number would be called. He attended Active Duty for Training (ADT) at Fort Polk, Louisiana, from July to November 1970. After serving in the National Guard for four years, he served in the United States Army Reserve until the end of his enlistment two years later.

He wrote in his Yale 25th reunion book: "I confess I had no desire to die in a Southeast Asian rice paddy. I considered the war in Vietnam already lost." In a 2007 interview, Bolton explained his comment in the reunion book saying his decision to avoid service in Vietnam was because "by the time I was about to graduate in 1970, it was clear to me that opponents of the Vietnam War had made it certain we could not prevail, and that I had no great interest in going there to have Teddy Kennedy give it back to the people I might die to take it away from."

In his 2007 book, Surrender Is Not an Option, Bolton described his perception of the war as a "futile struggle", and that "dying for your country was one thing, but dying to gain territory that antiwar forces in Congress would simply return to the enemy seemed ludicrous to me. Looking back, I am not terribly proud of this calculation..."

== Career ==
=== Attorney ===
From 1974 to 1981, Bolton was an associate at the Washington, D.C. office of Covington & Burling; he returned to the firm again from 1983 to 1985. Bolton was also a partner in the law firm of Lerner, Reed, Bolton & McManus, from 1993 to 1999. He was of counsel in the Washington, D.C. office of Kirkland & Ellis from 2008 until his appointment as National Security Advisor in 2018. In September 2015, Freedom Capital Investment Management appointed Bolton as a senior advisor.

=== Reagan and George H.W. Bush administrations ===
During the Reagan and George H. W. Bush administrations, his governmental roles were within the State Department, the Justice Department, and the U.S. Agency for International Development. He was a protégé of conservative North Carolina Senator Jesse Helms.

His Justice Department position as an assistant attorney general required him to advance Reagan administration positions, including opposition to financial reparations to Japanese-Americans held in World War II-era internment camps; the insistence on Reagan's executive privilege during William Rehnquist's chief justice confirmation hearings, when Congress asked for memos written by Rehnquist as a Nixon Justice Department official; shepherding the judicial nomination process for Antonin Scalia; and the framing of a bill to control illegal immigration as an essential drug war measure. He was also involved in the Iran–Contra affair.

Bolton's government service included positions such as:

- Assistant secretary for International Organization Affairs at the Department of State (1989–1993)
- Assistant Attorney General for the Civil Division (1988–1989)
- Assistant Attorney General for the Office of Legislative Affairs, Department of Justice (1985–1988)
- Assistant administrator for program and policy coordination, USAID (1982–1983); and
- General counsel, USAID (1981–1982). While working for USAID, Lynne Finney, a legal adviser for the agency, alleged that Bolton threatened to fire her for refusing to lobby for the deregulation of baby formula in developing nations
- Commissioner, United States Commission on International Religious Freedom (1999-2001)

== Under Secretary of State (2001–2005) ==
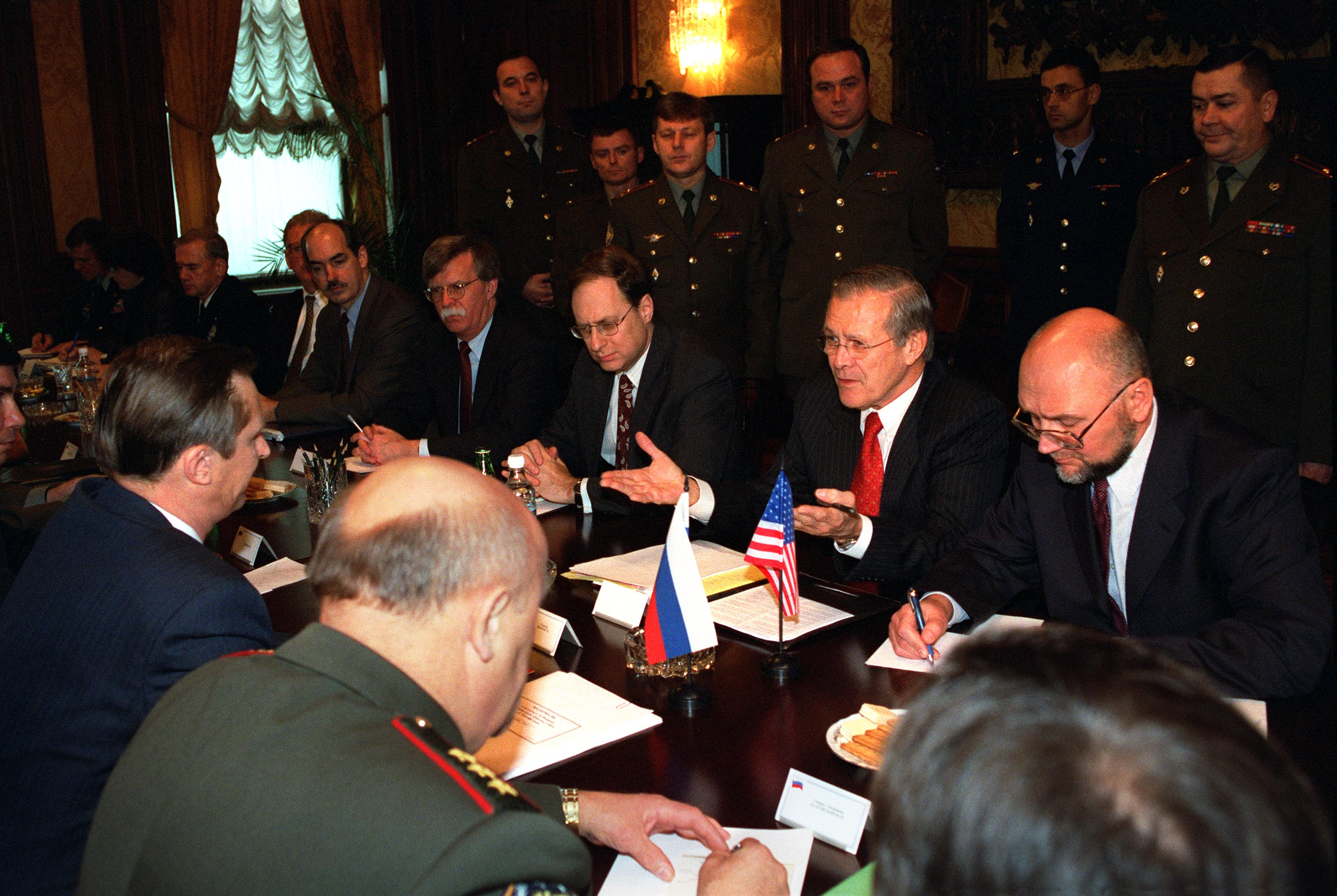
Bolton joins Secretary of Defense Donald H. Rumsfeld in negotiations with Rumsfeld's Russian counterpart in 2001.

Bolton worked as the Under Secretary of State for Arms Control and International Security, sworn into this position on May 11, 2001. In this role, a key area of his responsibility was the prevention of proliferation of weapons of mass destruction.

Bolton negotiated so-called "Article 98" agreements with countries to prohibit them from turning Americans over to the International Criminal Court, which is not recognized by the U.S. Bolton said the decision to pull out of the ICC was the "happiest moment" of his political career to date.

Bolton has often been accused of attempting to pressure the intelligence community to endorse his views. According to former coworkers, Bolton withheld information that ran counter to his goals from Secretary of State Colin Powell on multiple occasions, and from Powell's successor Condoleezza Rice on at least one occasion.

=== Weapons of mass destruction ===
Bolton was instrumental in derailing a 2001 biological weapons conference in Geneva convened to endorse a UN proposal to enforce the 1972 Biological Weapons Convention. He argued that the plan would have jeopardized U.S. national security by allowing spot inspections of suspected U.S. weapons sites.

In May 2002, Bolton gave a speech entitled "Beyond the Axis of Evil" in response to President Bush's State of the Union Address (where Bush characterized Iran, Iraq, and North Korea as part of an "Axis of Evil"). Bolton added three more nations to be grouped with the aforementioned rogue states: Cuba, Libya, and Syria. Bolton said they were all "state sponsors of terrorism that are pursuing or who have the potential to pursue weapons of mass destruction (WMD) or have the capability to do so in violation of their treaty obligations." During his time as Under Secretary of State, Bolton "sought to block, and often succeeded in sabotaging" the negotiations that Secretary of State Colin Powell had conducted with North Korea.

Also in 2002, Bolton is said to have flown to Europe to demand the resignation of Brazilian José Bustani, head of the Organisation for the Prohibition of Chemical Weapons (OPCW), and to have orchestrated his removal at a special session of the organization. Bustani was deemed to be an obstacle in creating the case for the invasion of Iraq. The United Nations' highest administrative tribunal later condemned the action as an "unacceptable violation" of principles protecting international civil servants. Bustani had been unanimously re-elected for a four-year term—with strong U.S. support—in May 2000, and in 2001 was praised for his leadership by Colin Powell. According to Bustani, John Bolton demanded that he step down in 24 hours, adding, "We know where your children are."

He also pushed for reduced funding for the Nunn–Lugar Cooperative Threat Reduction program to halt the proliferation of nuclear materials. At the same time, he was involved in the implementation of the Proliferation Security Initiative, working with a number of countries to intercept the trafficking in weapons of mass destruction and in materials for use in building nuclear weapons.

Democratic Congressman Henry Waxman alleged that Bolton played a role in encouraging the inclusion of the statement that British Intelligence had determined Iraq attempted to procure yellowcake uranium from Niger in Bush's 2003 State of the Union Address. These statements were claimed by critics of the President to be partly based on documents found to be forged. Waxman's allegations could not be confirmed, as they were based on classified documents. Bolton stated in June 2004 congressional testimony that Iran was lying about enriched uranium contamination: "Another unmistakable indicator of Iran's intentions is the pattern of repeatedly lying to ... the IAEA ... when evidence of uranium enriched to 36 percent was found, it attributed this to contamination from imported centrifuge parts." However, later isotope analysis supported Iran's explanation of foreign contamination for most of the observed enriched uranium. At their August 2005 meeting the IAEA's Board of Governors concluded: "Based on the information currently available to the Agency, the results of that analysis tend, on balance, to support Iran's statement about the foreign origin of most of the observed HEU [highly enriched uranium] contamination."

=== Diplomacy ===
According to an article in The New Republic, Bolton was highly successful in pushing his agenda, but his bluntness made him many enemies. "Iran's Foreign Ministry has called Bolton 'rude' and 'undiplomatic'." In response to critics, Bolton says his record "demonstrates clear support for effective multilateral diplomacy." Bush administration officials have stated that his past statements would allow him to negotiate from a powerful position. "It's like the Palestinians' having to negotiate with [Israeli Prime Minister] Ariel Sharon. If you have a deal, you know you have a deal," an anonymous official told CNN. He also "won widespread praise for his work establishing the Proliferation Security Initiative, a voluntary agreement supported (at the time) by 60 countries".

=== Interventions ===
In July 2022, during an interview with CNN reporter Jake Tapper, denying that President Donald Trump's involvement in the January 6 United States Capitol attack amounted to an attempt to overthrow the U.S. government, Bolton admitted to his personal involvement in planning unspecified coups d'état in foreign countries.

"As somebody who has helped plan coups d'etat — not here but, you know, other places — it takes a lot of work, and that's not what [President Donald Trump] did"

— John Bolton

According to Reuters, "it is highly unusual for U.S. officials to openly acknowledge their role in stoking unrest in foreign countries."

=== Unsubstantiated claims about a Cuban WMD program ===
In 2002, Bolton delivered a speech at the Heritage Foundation where he accused Cuba of having a secret biological weapons program, and of collaborating with Libya and Iran. Bolton asserted, "The United States believes that Cuba has at least a limited offensive biological warfare research and development effort. Cuba has provided dual-use biotechnology to other rogue states." Bolton made the remarks a week before former President Jimmy Carter was scheduled to meet Fidel Castro in Cuba, becoming the first U.S. president since the Cuban Revolution to visit Cuba in an effort to build bridges between the two countries.

The State Department's chief bioweapons analyst refused to approve the accusation made in the speech, telling Bolton that the State Department did not have evidence to substantiate Bolton's accusation. Subsequently, Bolton berated the analyst, unsuccessfully sought to fire him, began to exclude the analyst's supervisor from meetings, and tried to transfer the analyst to a different office. Bolton was also alleged to have sought to punish other intelligence officers who refused to endorse his claims about Cuba.

Columbia University international relations scholar Richard K. Betts described the reports about Bolton's pressure as "most blatant top-down pressure on intelligence" in the Bush administration. Bolton claims the issue was procedural rather than related to the content of his speech and that the officers, who did not work under him, behaved unprofessionally.

In April 2004, Bolton again accused Cuba of being a "terrorist and (biological weapons) threat to the United States." Experts at the time disputed the veracity of Bolton's claims, saying the evidence in support of the claim was weak. In September 2004 and in the wake of the failure to locate WMDs in Iraq, the Bush administration backed off claims that Cuba had an active biological weapons program.

== Ambassador to the United Nations (2005–2006) ==
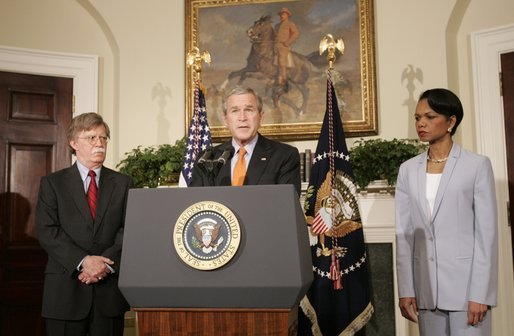
President George W. Bush announces Bolton's nomination as U.S. ambassador to the UN. Secretary of State Condoleezza Rice looks on.

On March 7, 2005, Bolton was nominated to the post of United States Ambassador to the United Nations by President George W. Bush. Bolton said previously at a forum that "there is no such thing as the United Nations", and "[i]f the U.N. secretary building in New York lost 10 stories, it wouldn't make a bit of difference". Several officials from U.N. Security Council member states were shocked that Bush would nominate someone they believed had a known antipathy toward the United Nations. As a result of a Democratic filibuster, he was recess-appointed to the post on August 1, 2005. Bolton's nomination received strong support from Republicans but faced heavy opposition from Democrats due initially to concerns about his strongly expressed views on the United Nations.

Holding a 10–8 majority in the Senate Foreign Relations Committee (tasked with vetting ambassadorial nominees), the Republican leadership hoped to send Bolton's nomination to the full Senate with a positive recommendation. Concern among some Republicans on the committee, however, prompted the leadership to avoid losing such a motion and instead to send the nomination forward with no recommendation. In the full Senate, Republican support for the nomination remained uncertain, with the most vocal Republican critic, Ohio Senator George V. Voinovich, circulating a letter urging his Republican colleagues to oppose the nomination.

Democrats insisted that a vote on the nomination was premature, given the resistance of the White House to share classified documents related to Bolton's alleged actions. The Republican leadership moved on two occasions to end debate, but because a supermajority of 60 votes is needed to end debate, the leadership was unable to muster the required votes with only a 55–44 majority in the body. An earlier agreement between moderates in both parties to prevent filibustering of nominees was interpreted by the Democrats to relate only to judicial nominees, not ambassadorships, although the leader of the effort, Sen. John McCain, said the spirit of the agreement was to include all nominees.

On November 9, 2006, Bush, only days after losing both houses to a Democratic majority, sent the nomination for Bolton to continue as representative for the United States at the UN. He said: "I believe that the leaders of both political parties must try to work through our differences. And I believe we will be able to work through differences. I reassured the House and Senate leaders that I intend to work with the new Congress in a bipartisan way to address issues confronting this country."

=== 2005 nomination, Senate confirmation hearings ===
On April 11, 2005, the Senate Foreign Relations Committee reviewed Bolton's qualifications. Bolton said he and his colleagues "view the U.N. as an important component of our diplomacy" and will work to solve its problems and enhance its strengths, echoing Secretary of State Condoleezza Rice's words from a month earlier.

On the first day of the hearings, Republican committee chairman Richard Lugar criticized Bolton for ignoring the "policy consequences" of his statements, saying diplomatic speech "should never be undertaken simply to score international debating points to appeal to segments of the U.S. public opinion or to validate a personal point of view." The committee's top Democrat, Joe Biden, compared sending Bolton to the UN to sending a "bull into a china shop," and expressed "grave concern" about Bolton's "diplomatic temperament" and his record: "In my judgment, your judgment about how to deal with the emerging threats have not been particularly useful," Biden said. Republican Senator George Allen said Bolton had the "experience," "knowledge," "background," "and the right principles to come into the United Nations at this time," calling him "the absolute perfect person for the job." Democratic Senator Russ Feingold asked Bolton about what he would have done had the Rwandan genocide occurred while he was ambassador to the United Nations, and criticized his answer—which focused on logistics—as "amazingly passive."

On the second day, April 12, 2005, the Senate panel focused on allegations discussed above that Bolton pressured intelligence analysts. Calling Bolton a "serial abuser", former State Department intelligence chief Carl W. Ford Jr. said, "I've never seen anybody quite like Secretary Bolton ... I don't have a second, third or fourth in terms of the way that he abuses his power and authority with little people." Ford contradicted Bolton's earlier testimony, saying: "I had been asked for the first time to fire an intelligence analyst for what he had said and done." Ford also characterized Bolton as a "kiss-up, kick-down sort of guy", implying that he was always ready to please whoever had authority over him, while having very little regard for people working under him.

Lugar, who criticized Bolton at his April 11 hearing, said the "paramount issue" was supporting Bush's nominee. He conceded that "bluntness ... may be required", even though it is not "very good diplomacy". Lincoln Chafee, the key member for Bolton's approval, said "the bar is very high" for rejecting the president's nominees, suggesting that Bolton would make it to the Senate.

On April 19, Democrats, with support from Voinovich, forced Lugar to delay the committee vote on Bolton's nomination until May. The debate concerning his nomination raged in the Senate prior to the Memorial Day recess. Two other Republicans on the Foreign Relations Committee, Chafee and Chuck Hagel, also expressed serious concerns about the Bolton nomination. Asked on April 20 if he was now less inclined to support the nomination, Chafee said, "That would be accurate." He elaborated that Bolton's prospects were "hard to predict" but said he expected that "the administration is really going to put some pressure on Senator Voinovich. Then it comes to the rest of us [who] have had some reservations."

On April 20, it emerged that Melody Townsel, a former USAID contractor, had reported to the Senate Foreign Relations Committee that Bolton had used inflammatory language and thrown objects in the course of her work activities in Moscow. Townsel's encounter with Bolton occurred when she served as a whistleblower against a poorly performing minority contractor for USAID, IBTCI. Townsel told the Senate Foreign Relations Committee staff that Bolton had made derogatory remarks about her sexual orientation and weight, among other workplace improprieties. In an official interview with Senate Foreign Relation Committee staff, Townsel detailed her accusations against Bolton, which were confirmed by Canadian designer Uno Ramat, who had served as an IBTCI employee and one of Townsel's AID colleagues. Time magazine, among other publications, verified Townsel's accusations and Ramat's supporting testimony, and Townsel's story was transcribed and entered into the official Senate committee record. Townsel, who was an employee of Young & Rubicam at the time of her encounter with Bolton, continued working for the company on a variety of other USAID projects.

On April 22, The New York Times and other media reported that Bolton's former boss, Colin Powell, personally opposed the nomination and had been in personal contact with Chafee and Hagel. The same day, Reuters reported that a spokesman for Senator Lisa Murkowski (R-Alaska) had said the Senator felt the committee "did the right thing delaying the vote on Bolton in light of the recent information presented to the committee."

Also on May 11, Newsweek reported allegations that the American position at the 7th Review Conference in May 2005 of the Nuclear Proliferation Treaty had been undercut by Bolton's "absence without leave" during the nomination fight, quoting anonymous sources "close to the negotiations".

=== Democrats' filibuster ===
On May 26, 2005, Senate Democrats postponed the vote on Bolton's UN nomination. The Republican leadership failed to gain enough support to pass a cloture motion on the floor debate over Bolton, and minority leader Harry Reid conceded the move signaled the "first filibuster of the year." The Democrats claimed that key documents regarding Bolton and his career at the Department of State were being withheld by the Bush administration. Scott McClellan, White House press secretary, responded by saying, "Just 72 hours after all the good will and bipartisanship (over a deal on judicial nominees), it's disappointing to see the Democratic leadership resort back to such a partisan approach."

The failure of the Senate to end debate on Bolton's nomination provided one surprise for some: Senate Majority Leader Bill Frist (R-Tennessee) voted against cloture for procedural reasons, so he could bring up a cloture vote in the future. (Although Voinovich once spoke against confirming Bolton, he voted for cloture.) Senator John Thune (R-South Dakota) voted to end debate but announced that he would vote against Bolton in the up-or-down vote as a protest against the government's plans to close a military base (Ellsworth) in his home state.

On June 20, 2005, the Senate voted again on cloture. The vote failed 54–38, six votes short of ending debate. That marked an increase of two "no" votes, including the defection of Voinovich, who switched his previous "yes" vote and urged President Bush to pick another nominee (Democrats Mark Pryor, Mary Landrieu and Ben Nelson voted to end debate both times). On June 21, Frist expressed his view that attempting another vote would be pointless, but later that day, following a lunch at the White House, changed his position, saying he would continue to push for an up-or-down vote. Voinovich later recanted his opposition and stated that if Bolton were renominated he would have supported the nomination.

=== Accusations of false statement ===
On July 28, 2005, it was revealed that a statement made by Bolton on forms submitted to the Senate was false. Bolton indicated that in the prior five years he had not been questioned in any investigation, but in fact he had been interviewed by the State Department's Inspector General as part of an investigation into the sources of pre-war claims of weapons of mass destruction in Iraq. After insisting for weeks that Bolton had testified truthfully on the form, the State Department reversed itself, saying Bolton had simply forgotten about the investigation.

=== Recess appointment ===
On August 1, 2005, Bush officially made a recess appointment of Bolton, installing him as Permanent U.S. Representative to the UN. A recess appointment lasts until the next session of Congress ends or until the individual is renominated and confirmed by the Senate. During the announcement, Bush said, "This post is too important to leave vacant any longer, especially during a war and a vital debate about U.N. reform." Democrats criticized the appointment, and Senator Christopher Dodd (D-CT) of the Senate Foreign Relations Committee said Bolton would lack credibility in the U.N. because he lacked Senate confirmation. U.N. Secretary-General Kofi Annan welcomed Mr. Bolton, but told reporters that the new ambassador should consult with others as the administration continued to press for changes at the United Nations.

=== Term at the United Nations ===
The Economist called Bolton "the most controversial ambassador ever sent by America to the United Nations." Some colleagues in the UN appreciated the goals Bolton was trying to achieve, but not his abrasive style. The New York Times, in its editorial The Shame of the United Nations, praised Bolton's stance on "reforming the disgraceful United Nations Human Rights Commission", saying "John Bolton, is right; Secretary-General Kofi Annan is wrong." The Times also said the commission at that time was composed of "some of the world's most abusive regimes" who used their membership as cover to continue their abusiveness.

Bolton also opposed the proposed replacement for the Human Rights Commission, the UN Human Rights Council, as not going far enough for reform, saying: "We want a butterfly. We don't intend to put lipstick on a caterpillar and call it a success."

=== 2006 nomination ===
Bush announced his intention to renominate Bolton for confirmation as U.N. ambassador at the beginning of 2006, and a new confirmation hearing was held on July 27, 2006, in the hope of completing the process before the expiration of Bolton's recess appointment at the end of the 109th Congress. Voinovich, who had previously stood in opposition to Bolton, had amended his views and determined that Bolton was doing a "good job" as UN ambassador; in February 2006, he said "I spend a lot of time with John on the phone. I think he is really working very constructively to move forward."

Over the summer and during the fall election campaign, no action was taken on the nomination because Chafee, who was in a difficult re-election campaign, blocked a Senate Foreign Relations Committee vote. Without his concurrence, the SFRC would have been deadlocked 9–9, and the nomination could not have gone to the Senate floor for a full vote. Bush formally resubmitted the nomination on November 9, 2006, immediately following a midterm election that would give control of the 110th Congress to the Democratic party. Chafee, who had just lost his re-election bid, issued a statement saying he would vote against recommending Bolton for a Senate vote, citing what he considered to be a mandate from the recent election results: "On Tuesday, the American people sent a clear message of dissatisfaction with the foreign policy approach of the Bush administration. To confirm Mr. Bolton to the position of U.N. ambassador would fly in the face of the clear consensus of the country that a new direction is called for."

=== Termination of service ===
On December 4, 2006, Bolton announced that he would terminate his work as U.S. representative to the UN at the end of the recess appointment and would not continue to seek confirmation. His letter of resignation from the Bush administration was accepted on December 4, 2006, effective when his recess appointment ended December 9 at the formal adjournment of the 109th Congress.

The announcement was characterized as Bolton's "resignation" by the Associated Press, United Press International, ABC News, and other news sources, as well as a White House press release and President Bush himself. The White House, however, later objected to the use of this language. Deputy Press Secretary Dana Perino told CBS News "it is not a resignation." The actual language of the President's written acceptance was: "It is with deep regret that I accept John Bolton's decision to end his service in the administration as permanent representative of the United States to the United Nations when his commission expires." However, at a press conference, the President said, "I received the resignation of Ambassador John Bolton. I accept it. I'm not happy about it. I think he deserved to be confirmed." Some news organizations subsequently altered their language to phrases such as "to step down," "to leave," or "to exit."

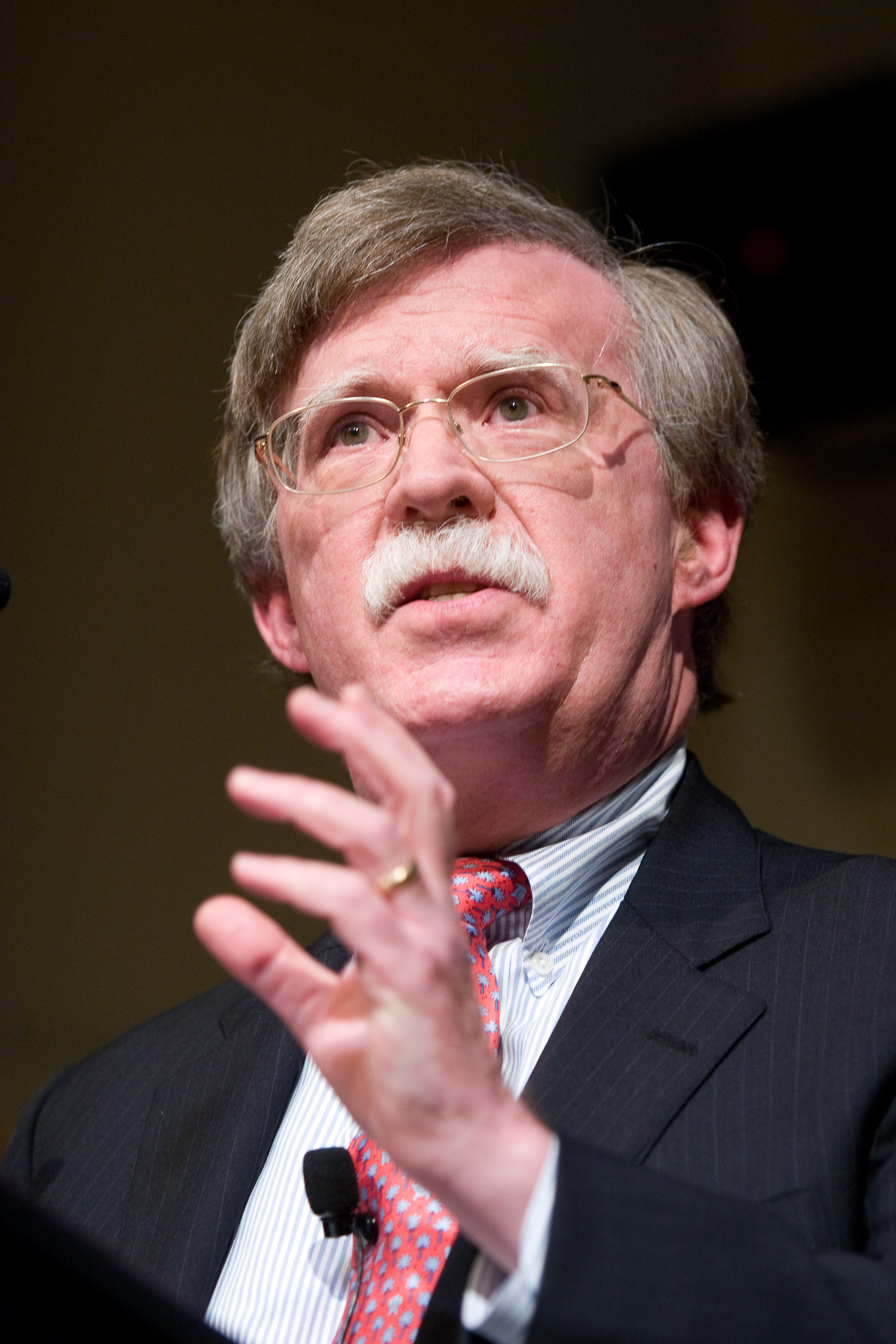
John Bolton in 2008

=== Support for Bolton ===
Upon the reveal of Bolton as the nominee, Secretary of State Condoleezza Rice explained that "[t]he president and I have asked John to do this work because he knows how to get things done." Further, she explained that she saw Bolton "as a tough-minded diplomat" with "a strong record of success" bolstered by "a proven track record of effective multilateralism." Nile Gardiner, then a security specialist at the Heritage Foundation, explained that "John Bolton will be a U.S. ambassador who aggressively pursues the U.S. national interest at the United Nations." He viewed Bolton as someone who would "be tenacious and aggressive in pursuing the president's goals."

During his confirmation hearings in 2005, letters with signatures of more than 64 co-workers and professional colleagues were sent to Senator Richard Lugar, Chairman of the Senate Foreign Relations Committee, in praise of Bolton and contradicting other criticisms and allegations concerning his diplomatic style and his treatment of colleagues and staff.

In late 2006, when his nomination was again before the committee, another letter signed by professional colleagues supporting the renomination was sent to Senator Lugar.

In a New York Times article from 2018 (shortly after when he was announced to be President Donald Trump's pick for National Security Advisor), multiple figures in Bolton's appointment fight came forward to share what they thought about him in 2005-2006. Dan Diller, deputy staff director for the Senate Foreign Relations Committee Republican majority, wrote to the Times, explaining that their investigation "found no clear ethical transgressions." In his view, Bolton "was an aggressive, sharp-elbowed bureaucratic operator who always tried to get his way, but would relent in the end rather than engaging in insubordination."

== National Security Advisor (2018–2019) ==
=== Speculation on position (2016–2017) ===
In an interview with conservative radio host Hugh Hewitt during the 2016 U.S. presidential campaign, Republican nominee Donald Trump named Bolton as a possible choice for Secretary of State. Appearing on Fox News' Fox and Friends on December 1, 2016, Bolton admitted he was being considered as a Secretary of State candidate for the incoming Trump administration. Several Trump associates claim Bolton was not chosen, in part, due to Trump's disdain for Bolton's signature mustache.

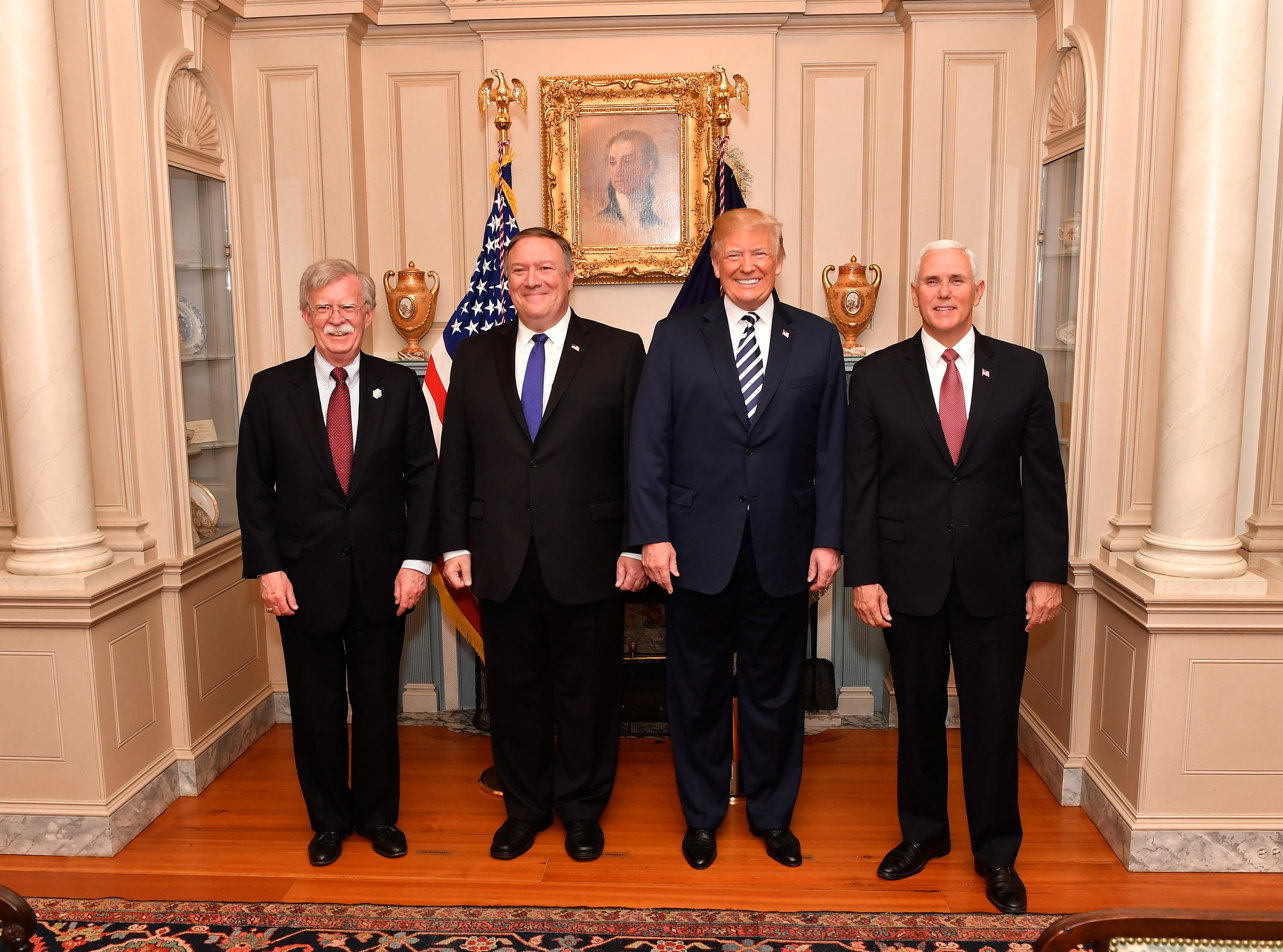
May 2, 2018: (from left) Bolton, Mike Pompeo, President Trump, Vice President Pence

The evening of December 10, the BBC cited NBC reports that "sources close to Mr Trump [were] ... saying that Mr Tillerson is likely to be named next week" and that former UN ambassador John Bolton "will serve as his deputy".

Bolton has supported theories about the health of Hillary Clinton and about her aide Huma Abedin, and in December 2016, Bolton said the conclusion of the United States Intelligence Community that Russian hackers had intervened to help elect Donald Trump in 2016 may have been a "false flag" operation. In a subsequent interview on Fox News, Bolton criticized the Obama administration's retaliatory sanctions as insufficient and suggested that the US response should "make them [the Russians] feel pain".

=== Tenure ===
In February 2017 President Trump interviewed Bolton and three others to determine who would fill the position of National Security Advisor vacated by Lt. Gen. Michael T. Flynn. The position ultimately went to H. R. McMaster. Trump "made a point on Monday of praising Mr. Bolton and saying that he would find a position for him in his administration eventually." Bolton was seen at the White House on the evening of March 6, 2018, presumably to be interviewed as a candidate for national security adviser.

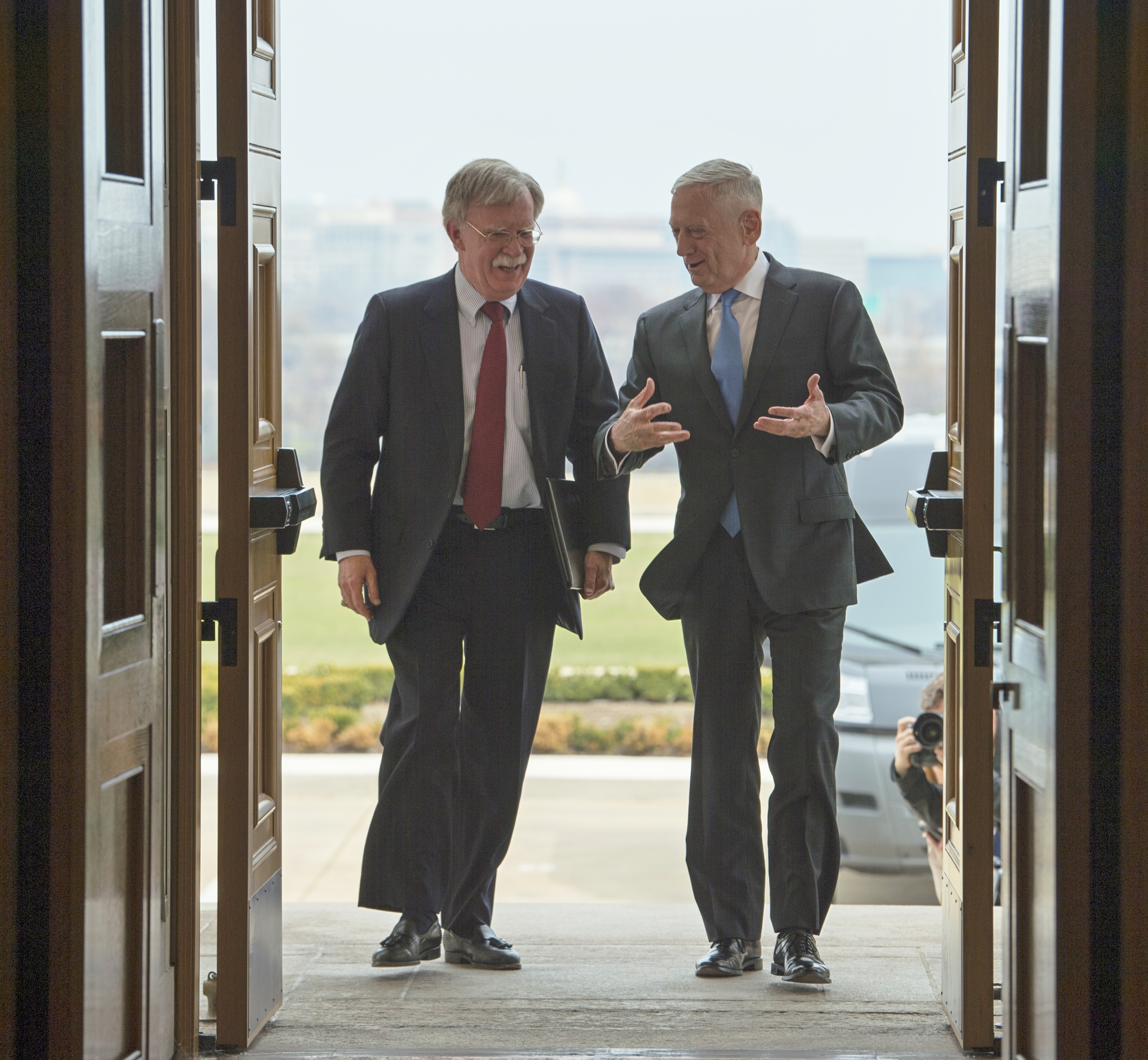
U.S. Defense Secretary James N. Mattis greets the National Security Advisor-designate Bolton at the Pentagon in March 2018.

The New York Times reported on March 22, 2018, that John Bolton would replace National Security Adviser H. R. McMaster, which was confirmed by Trump in a tweet later that day. Bolton began his position as National Security Advisor on April 9, 2018. The New York Times wrote that the rise of Bolton and Mike Pompeo, coupled with the departure of Rex Tillerson and General McMaster, meant Trump's foreign policy team was now "the most radically aggressive foreign policy team around the American president in modern memory", and compared it to the foreign policy team surrounding George W. Bush, notably with Dick Cheney and Donald Rumsfeld.

On April 10, 2018, Homeland Security Advisor Tom Bossert resigned at Bolton's request, and Bolton said he was considering a merger of the NSC with the Homeland Security Council. During his first week in office Bolton requested and obtained the resignations of multiple National Security Council (NSC) employees including NSC spokesman Michael Anton (April 8), deputy national security adviser Nadia Schadlow (April 10), and deputy national security adviser Ricky L. Waddell (April 12). CNN reported in September 2018 that Bolton had significantly shrunk the number of NSC personnel, cutting it to under 300.

In April 2018, Bolton pressed President Trump to withdraw from the Iran Nuclear Deal, which Trump did a month later.

The Huffington Post reported that on May 8, 2018, Bolton removed Timothy Ziemer and dissolved his Global Health Security team formerly on the NSC leaving the administration's high level preparation for and ability to respond to pandemics, infectious disease, and other biological threats unclear. The choice to remove and not replace Ziemer in the midst of an emerging Ebola outbreak in The Democratic Republic of Congo was criticized in several news outlets.

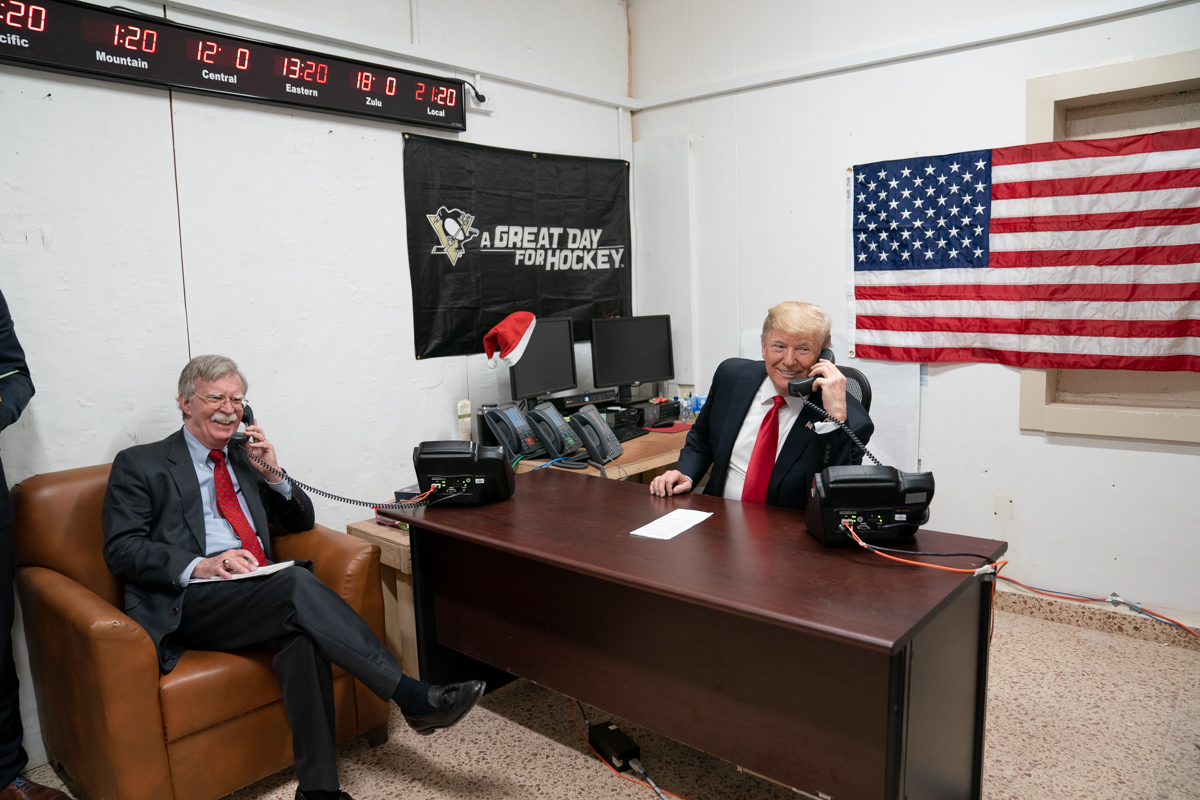
December 26, 2018: Bolton and President Trump on the phone with Iraq Prime Minister Adil Abdul-Mahdi during visit to U.S. troops

On September 10, 2018, in his first major address as National Security Advisor, Bolton criticized the International Criminal Court, saying it lacks checks and balances, exercises "jurisdiction over crimes that have disputed and ambiguous definitions," and has failed to "deter and punish atrocity crimes." Calling the ICC a threat to "American sovereignty and U.S. national security," Bolton said it is "superfluous," given that "domestic judicial systems already hold American citizens to the highest legal and ethical standards." He added that the U.S. would do everything "to protect our citizens" should the ICC attempt to prosecute U.S. servicemen over alleged detainee abuse in Afghanistan, and it would bar ICC judges and prosecutors from entering the U.S. and sanction their funds. He also criticized Palestinian efforts to bring Israel before the ICC over allegations of human rights abuses in the occupied West Bank and Gaza.

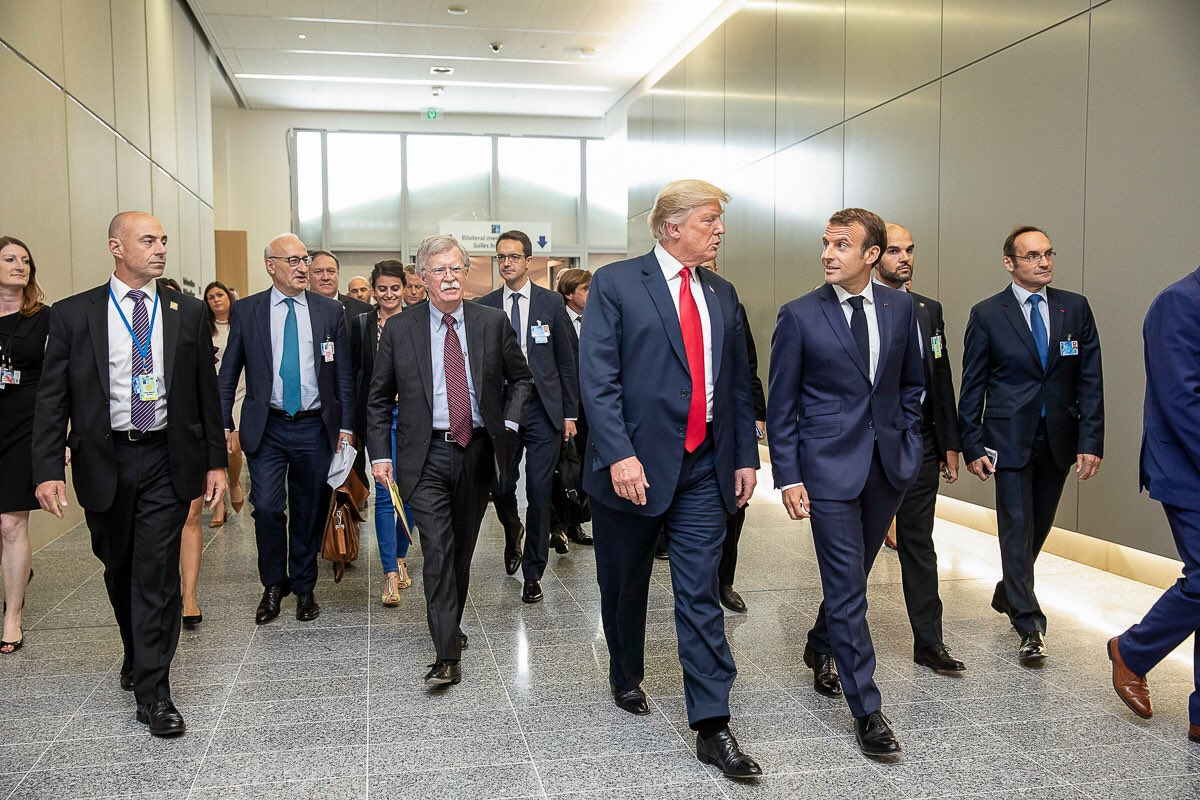
Trump, Bolton and Emmanuel Macron at the 2018 NATO summit in Brussels

In 2018, Bolton requested that the Pentagon provide the White House with options for military strikes against Iran. According to the New York Times, Bolton "intensified the administration's policy of isolating and pressuring Iran—reflecting an animus against Iran's leaders that dates back to his days as an official in the George W. Bush administration. As a private citizen, he later called for military strikes on Iran, as well as regime change."

In November 2018, Bolton said that an audio recording related to the assassination of Jamal Khashoggi did not prove that Saudi Arabian Crown Prince Mohammed bin Salman ordered the murder.

As National Security Advisor, Bolton eliminated the kinds of internal policy debates that his predecessor H. R. McMaster had in place. The New York Times writes that this change in practices contributed to Trump's sudden decision to withdraw the United States from Syria in January 2019.

As National Security Advisor, Bolton advanced policies skeptical and hostile toward international organizations. By his first year as National Security Advisor, Bolton had reshaped the National Security Council and become influential within the Trump Administration.

By May 2019, Trump had undercut some of Bolton's major hard line positions, stating he was not seeking regime change in Iran and contradicting Bolton's assertion that North Korea had recently violated United Nations resolutions by testing new short-range missiles.

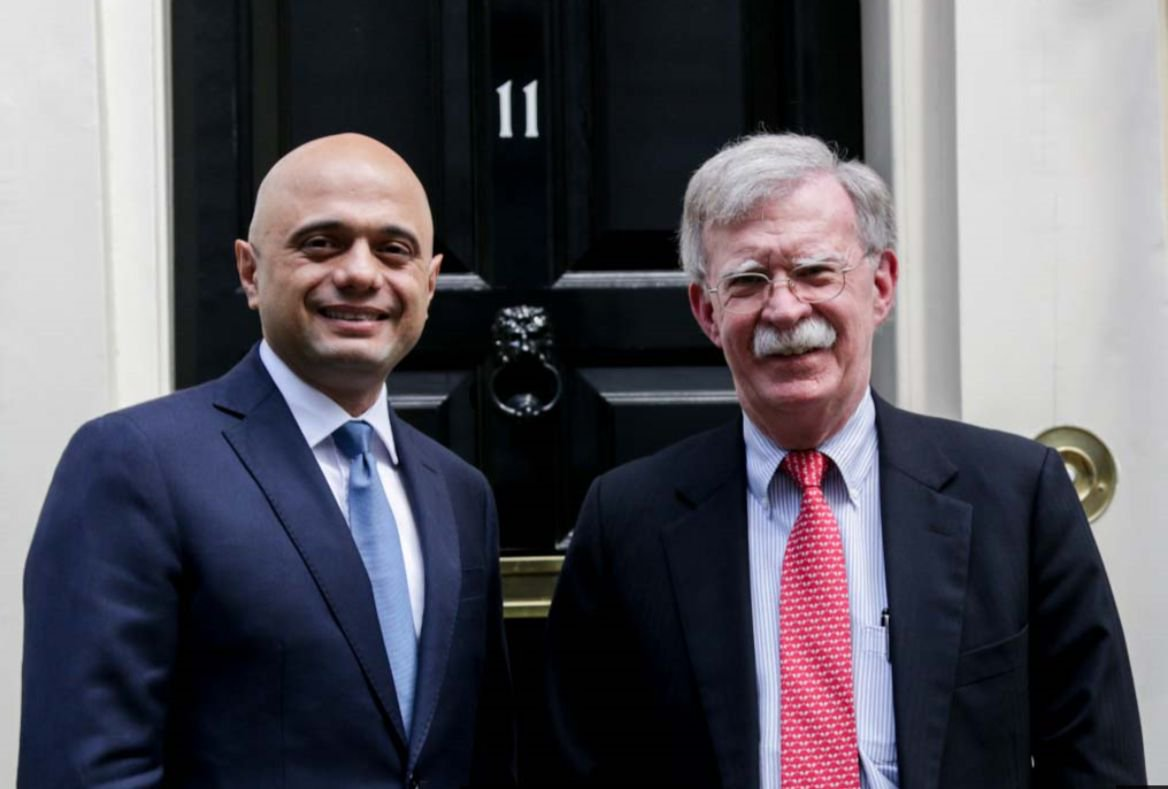
In 2019, John Bolton, then U.S. National Security Advisor meeting United Kingdom Chancellor of the Exchequer Sajid Javid (left) at 11 Downing Street

In late August 2019, Bolton met Alexander Lukashenko in Minsk, Belarus.

On September 10, 2019, President Trump claimed on Twitter that he had told Bolton on September 9 his "services are no longer needed" given "many" disagreements with Trump, thus Bolton gave his resignation on September 10. Just minutes later, Bolton contradicted Trump's account, tweeting out this claim: Bolton offered to resign on September 9, with Trump replying: "Let's talk about it tomorrow." Bolton later told the media Trump "never asked" for his resignation "directly or indirectly", and that he had both offered to resign and actually resigned of his own accord. Meanwhile, the White House endorsed Trump's version of the events. Politico reported that Tucker Carlson had urged Trump to fire Bolton.

After Bolton's departure, Trump claimed that Bolton's views were "not necessarily tougher" than his own: "in some cases, he thought it was too tough what we were doing". On Cuba and Venezuela, Trump claimed that his own views were "far stronger" than Bolton's: "He was holding me back!" Bolton himself was known for his hawkish positions, including on Cuba and Venezuela, while Trump previously in May 2019 offered a different view of Bolton: "I actually temper John, which is pretty amazing."

Following his departure, Bolton was reappointed as a senior advisor to investment company Rhône Group, a role he had held previously.

Since leaving the first Trump Administration, Bolton has been harshly critical of Donald Trump, with a 2023 edition of his memoirs criticizing Trump as a man who punishes "personal enemies and appease[s] adversaries Russia and China".

=== Trump–Ukraine scandal ===
Following Bolton's departure, Fiona Hill, who served as the National Security Council's senior director for Europe and Russia, testified before a Congressional committee that Bolton had disassociated himself from what he viewed as the Trump administration's effort to pressure Ukraine into investigating the President's political rivals.

Bolton refused to attend his scheduled deposition in the impeachment inquiry against Donald Trump on November 7, 2019, and threatened to take legal action if he was subpoenaed. Bolton said he was willing to testify, but wanted a federal court to first rule on a lawsuit by his former deputy seeking a court ruling on the competing claims of the Trump administration and Congress. However, in a written statement obtained by NBC News on January 6, 2020, Bolton announced that he would testify during the Senate impeachment trial should he be issued a subpoena to do so. A 51-vote majority would be required from the Senate in order to obtain the subpoena.

As the second week of opening statements was set to begin, to be followed by a vote on whether to call witnesses, The New York Times reported that Bolton wrote in his forthcoming book that the President had told him in August 2019 that he wanted to continue freezing the Ukraine aid until officials there pursued investigations into Democrats, including the Bidens. The Times also stated that "Drafts of the book outline the potential testimony of the former national security adviser if he were called as a witness in the president's impeachment trial." On January 23, as Bolton was preparing for possible Senate testimony about the assertions in his manuscript, the National Security Council informed him that it contained classified information and "may not be published or otherwise disclosed without the deletion of this classified information.” Bolton's attorney stated he did not believe the manuscript contained sensitive information. The dispute set the stage for a prolonged review, with Bolton's attorney asking that access to the manuscript be limited to "those career government officials and employees regularly charged with responsibility for such reviews." The leaked contents from the book also resulted in Trump impeachment lawyer Jay Sekulow dismissing Bolton's claims as "inadmissible" when he argued before the Senate in defense of Trump on January 28, 2020. Democratic trial manager Adam Schiff later remarked that Sekulow's assertion validated the argument that Bolton should be called to testify.

== Punditry and conservative activism ==
Bolton was executive director of the Committee on Resolutions in the Republican National Committee from 1983 to 1984. Between 1997 and 2000, he worked as an assistant to James Baker when he was the UN Secretary-General envoy to the Western Sahara. Since 2006, he has been a paid Fox News contributor and a senior fellow at the American Enterprise Institute. For 2017, he reported an income of $569,000 from Fox News. Bolton was a contributor to The Weekly Standard, an American conservative opinion magazine, from 1997 to 2000, and again from 2014 to 2016.

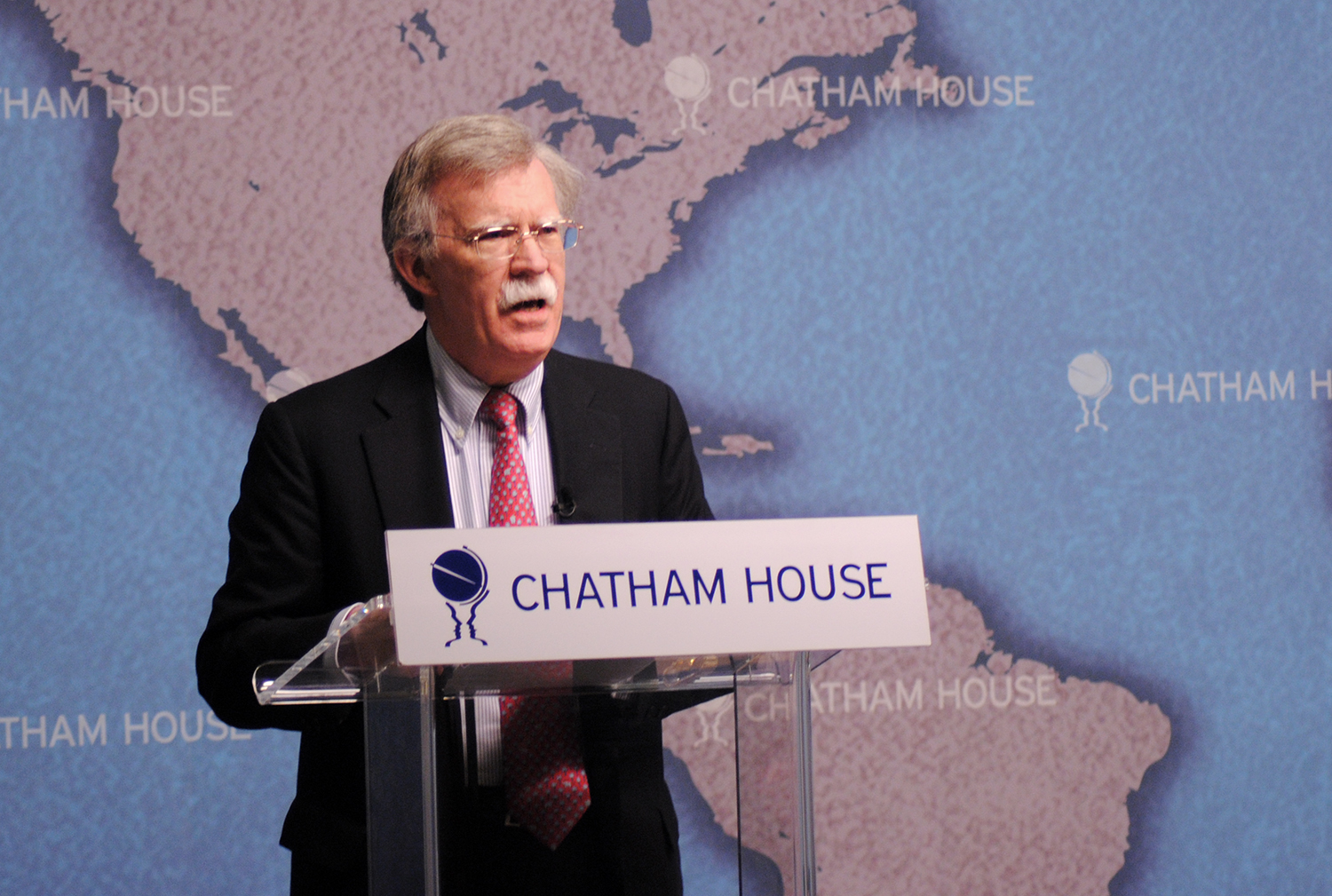
Bolton speaks at Chatham House on foreign policy challenges facing the Obama Administration.

From 2013 until March 2018, Bolton was chairman of the far-right anti-Muslim Gatestone Institute, which is prominent for disseminating false anti-immigrant and anti-Muslim information. In 2018, the White House reported that Bolton's total income for 2017 had been $2.2 million which included $569,000 from Fox News and $747,000 in speaking fees from, among others, the Victor Pinchuk Foundation (a Ukrainian NGO), Deutsche Bank, and HSBC.

=== 2012 presidential election ===
Bolton considered running for president in the 2012 U.S. presidential election. He received attention in conservative circles, including the cover of the December 31, 2010, issue of National Review magazine. He told Politico: "As I survey the situation, I think the Republican field is wide open. I don't think the party's anywhere close to a decision. And stranger things have happened. For example, inexperienced senators from Illinois have gotten presidential nominations." In September 2011, Bolton said he would not run for president in 2012.

During the Republican primary, Republican presidential-hopeful Newt Gingrich said he would ask Bolton to serve as his Secretary of State. In January 2012, Bolton endorsed Mitt Romney for the 2012 Republican nomination.

=== American Enterprise Institute ===
Bolton was senior vice president of the American Enterprise Institute, a conservative think tank, from 1997 to 2001. At the time, he frequently wrote columns criticizing the Clinton administration's foreign policy. Bolton said Clinton's policy on Iraq was "worse than incompetent", his policy on North Korea was "egregiously wrong", and his Libya policy was a "catastrophic loss of U.S. credibility."

After leaving the George W. Bush Administration in 2006, Bolton returned to the American Enterprise Institute as a Senior Fellow. From 2010 until 2018, Bolton served as Director, Foreign and Defense Policy Studies for AEI. In Bolton's time at the American Enterprise Institute, he spoke against the policy of rewarding North Korea for ending its nuclear weapons program. He said the policy would encourage others to violate nuclear non-proliferation rules so they could then be rewarded for following the rules they'd already agreed to.

In July 2013, Bolton was identified as a key member of Groundswell, a secretive coalition of right-wing activists and journalists attempting to advance political change behind the scenes through lobbying of high-level contacts.

=== John Bolton Super PAC ===
In 2013, Bolton set up the John Bolton Super PAC. It raised $11.3 million for Republican candidates in the 2014 and 2016 elections and spent $5.6 million, paying Cambridge Analytica at least $650,000 for voter data analysis and digital video ad targeting in support of the campaigns of Senators Thom Tillis (R-N.C.), Tom Cotton (R-Ark.), and Richard Burr (R-N.C.), and of former U.S. Senator (R-MA) Scott Brown's unsuccessful 2014 bid for a U.S. Senate seat for New Hampshire. In September 2016, Bolton announced that his Super PAC would spend $1 million on (R-N.C.) Senator Richard Burr's reelection effort by targeting ads at "social media users and Dish Network and Direct TV subscribers".

The Center for Public Integrity analysed the John Bolton Super PAC's campaign finance filings and found that they had paid Cambridge Analytica more than $1.1 million since 2014 for "research" and "survey research". According to Federal Election Commission filings, Cambridge Analytica was paid more than $811,000 by them in the 2016 presidential election; in the same election cycle, the Super PAC spent around $2.5 million in support of Republican U.S. Senate candidates.

Bolton said he aims to raise and spend $25 million for up to 90 Republican candidates in the 2018 midterm elections. In January 2018, Bolton announced a $1 million advertising campaign in support of Kevin Nicholson's bid for the Republican nomination to run against incumbent Democratic Senator Tammy Baldwin of Wisconsin. The Super PAC ran an ad campaign in the Green Bay area in January 2018; on March 19, 2018, the Super PAC announced a two-week $278,000 television and radio ad campaign in the Milwaukee area.

Major donors to the John Bolton Super PAC are Robert Mercer, who gave $4 million from 2012 to 2016; Home Depot co-founder Bernard Marcus, and Los Angeles real estate developer Geoffrey Palmer.

After Bolton was appointed National Security Advisor in March 2018, the John Bolton Super PAC and the John Bolton PAC announced that their political activities were suspended temporarily, effective March 31, 2018. The Super PAC's FEC filings showed a balance of $2.6 million in unspent donations at the end of March 2018.

=== 2024 presidential election ===
Bolton had openly considered the idea of running for president in the 2024 United States presidential election in order to secure the Republican nomination against former President Donald Trump. However, he had been widely ridiculed for proposing running for president, due to bipartisan opposition to him and his policies.

== 2025 indictment ==
=== Background ===
On June 16, 2020, the Trump Justice Department attempted to block publication of Bolton's memoir, The Room Where It Happened, seeking to confiscate Bolton's $2 million advance for breach of contract, asserting he had not completed the prepublication security review as he had agreed to receive his security clearance. Bolton had submitted the book for security review in December 2019, and after months of discussions, was told on April 27 by Ellen Knight—the National Security Council's senior director for prepublication review—that no other classification issues remained. However, the White House did not provide Bolton written notice that he could proceed with publication, and in May another NSC official was asked to further review the manuscript. On June 17, the Justice Department asked a federal judge to issue an injunction to block publication of the book, which had already been printed, bound and shipped to distribution warehouses for its official release the following week. By that day, media outlets had acquired copies of the book and begun publishing articles about its contents.

In its brief filed with the court, the Justice Department provided six examples of what it asserted were classified items that remained in the book. Trump had previously asserted that any conversation with him is "highly classified." During a hearing on June 19, federal judge Royce Lamberth castigated Bolton for proceeding to publish his book without formal clearance, but ruled that publication of the book could proceed.

Bolton's attorney asserted that the White House was slow-walking the review process to prevent the book, which contained extensive harsh criticism of Trump, from being released during the 2020 election campaign. According to reporting, Trump claimed that the book contained "highly classified" information but also characterized the book as "pure fiction."

On June 21, a pirated copy of the book appeared online. The book was released on June 23. Later that summer, the Justice Department opened a criminal investigation into whether the book revealed classified information, empaneling a grand jury that subpoenaed the publisher's communications records.

The New York Times reported in 2021 that Justice Department had dropped its criminal inquiry of Bolton in June of that year and moved to end efforts to confiscate proceeds from his book. However, the Times later reported in 2025 that the DOJ's criminal investigation into Bolton had actually "gained momentum in the Biden administration."

=== FBI raid ===
FBI agents raided Bolton's home on August 22, 2025, as part of a documents investigation. The New York Post was the first outlet to report on this incident. The raid happened at approximately 7 a.m. when law enforcement officers entered Bolton's house, authorized by a court order, and started looking for "classified materials". His property in Washington, D.C., was also raided by FBI. The operation was a part of a criminal investigation started when Joe Biden was the president. Donald Trump said that he had no prior knowledge of the raid. Bolton was neither arrested nor charged with any crime; video footage showed him talking with the agents at his residence.

Reportedly, the raid was conducted after a federal magistrate judge signed a search warrant shortly after another judge in Maryland signed a different search warrant. JD Vance said that the raid was not politically motivated and that it was purely "driven by the law". Moments after the raid, FBI director Kash Patel issued a statement that "no one is above the law". Attorney General Pam Bondi added, "America's safety isn't negotiable. Justice will be pursued. Always". AP News reported that Bolton was not present in his home during the raid and that his spokesperson did not give any comments on the situation. Kash Patel said he ordered the raid directly.

An AOL email account that Bolton used to submit his draft manuscript was reportedly hacked by a foreign entity. According to CNN, intelligence related to the hack had been collected years prior by the CIA, and was used as the basis for the warrant to search Bolton’s house. Categories of potentially classified records that the FBI reported finding at Bolton’s office included travel memo documents with a "secret" label, confidential documents from the United States Mission to the United Nations, confidential documents related to strategic communications, and classified documents related to weapons of mass destruction. By mid-October, prosecutors were preparing an indictment related to his handling of the documents.

=== Indictment ===
On October 16, 2025, Bolton was indicted by a federal grand jury in the District of Maryland on 18 charges related to the mishandling of classified documents. The indictment includes eight counts of unlawful transmission of national defense information and ten counts of unlawful retention of national defense information. Many of Trump's critics have seen Bolton's indictment as part of a larger crackdown against other Trump critics, with Bolton being the third Trump critic after James Comey and Letitia James to be indicted. However, the New York Times has reported that, unlike with other 2025 prosecutions of high-profile Trump critics, the Bolton prosecution process "followed normal department channels, without firings, strong-arm orders from the White House, or forced transfers."

=== Arrest, arraignment and potential plea deal ===
On October 17, 2025, Bolton surrendered to authorities at a courthouse in Greenbelt, Maryland. While appearing before US magistrate judge Timothy Sullivan, Bolton pled not guilty to the 18-count indictment brought against him.

On June 4, 2026, National Review reported that Bolton had agreed to plead guilty to mishandling classified information in connection with his memoir about his tenure as national security adviser in the first Trump administration. It is unknown if the deal would involve prison time as there is no minimum time for a felony count of illegal retention of classified information. The maximum sentence is five years' imprisonment. The plea deal may end up in a fine as high as $2.25 million, as Bolton profited from the sale of his memoir. On June 26, 2026, Bolton pled guilty to one single charge of illegal retention of classified information .

== Political positions ==
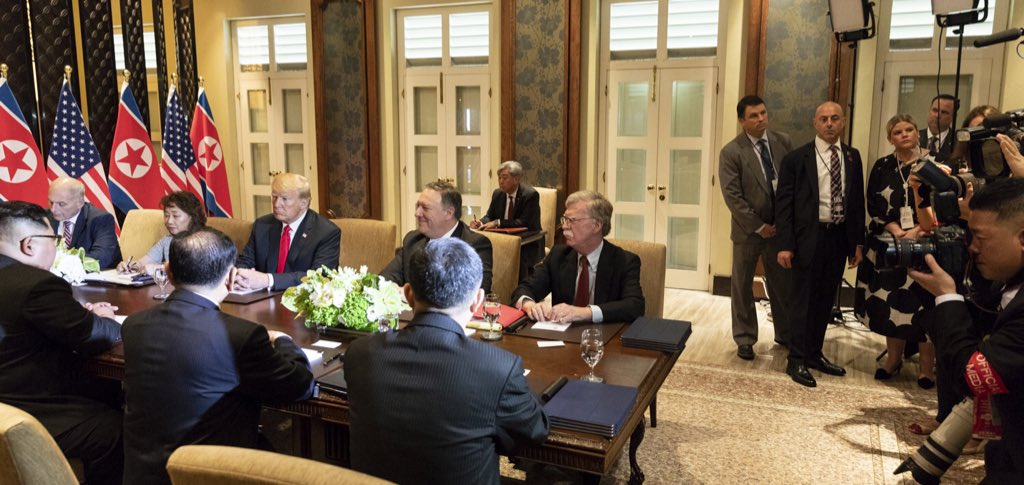
Bolton, President Trump and Kim Jong-un in Singapore on June 12, 2018

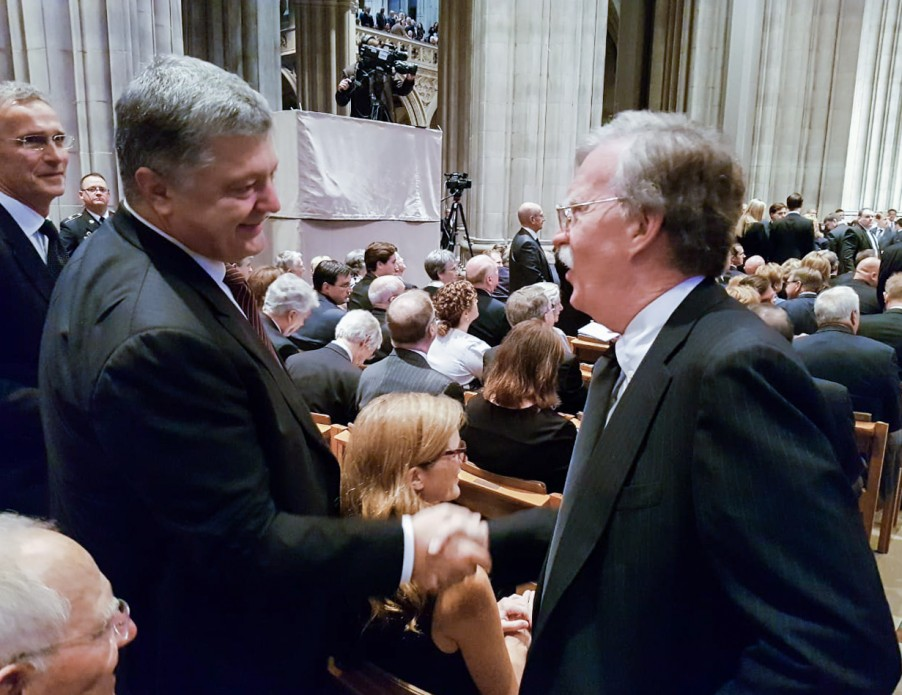
Bolton with Ukrainian President Petro Poroshenko and NATO Secretary General Jens Stoltenberg in September 2018

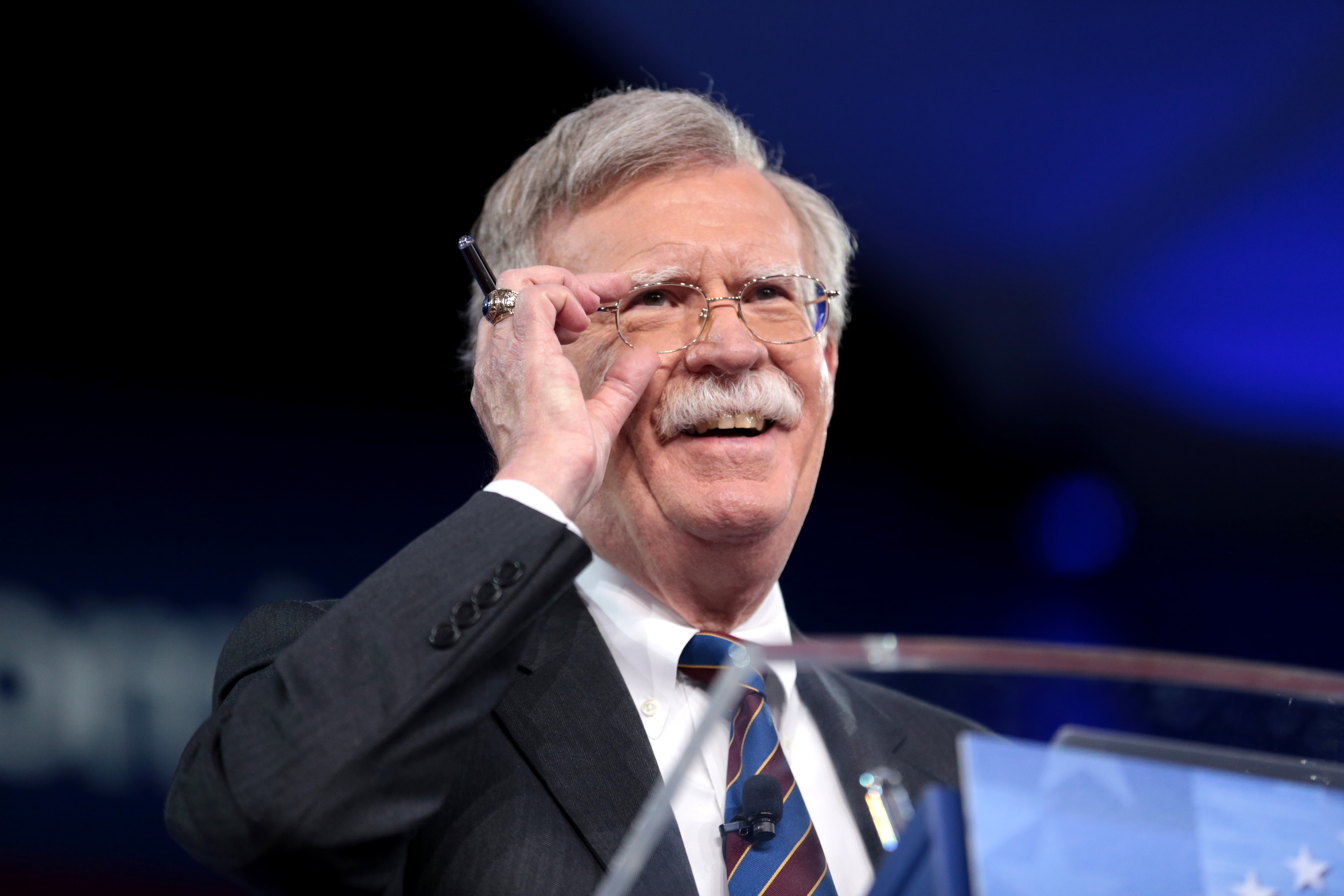
Bolton speaking at the 2017 Conservative Political Action Conference (CPAC) in National Harbor, Maryland, on February 24, 2017

He declared himself in an interview with Edward Luce of the Financial Times in 2007 to be a "Goldwater conservative", as opposed to being a neoconservative.

=== Unilateralism and Americanism ===
Americanism is Bolton's core belief, according to The New York Times:

Long before Mr. Trump popularized his "America First" slogan, Mr. Bolton termed himself an "Americanist" who prioritized a cold-eyed view of national interests and sovereignty over what they both saw as a starry-eyed fixation on democracy promotion and human rights. They shared a deep skepticism of globalism and multilateralism, a commonality that empowered Mr. Bolton to use his time in the White House to orchestrate the withdrawal of the United States from arms control treaties and other international agreements.

Bolton is skeptical of international organizations and international law, believing them to endanger American sovereignty, and does not believe they have legitimate authority under the U.S. Constitution. He criticized the Obama administration's foreign policy for what he perceived as surrendering U.S. sovereignty. He also prefers unilateralism over multilateralism. In a 2000 article in the Chicago Journal of International Law, Bolton described himself as a "convinced Americanist", favoring it over what he described as "globalism". In his roles in the U.S. government, however, Bolton has been more pragmatic in his actions toward international organizations, though according to Foreign Policy, he effectively advanced his views on this subject during his tenure in the Trump Administration.

Bolton has criticized the International Criminal Court, seeing it as a threat to U.S. sovereignty. Bolton said: "If the court comes after us, Israel or other US allies, we will not sit quietly. We will ban its judges and prosecutors from entering the United States. We will sanction their funds in the US financial system, and we will prosecute them in the US criminal system."

==== Views on the United Nations ====
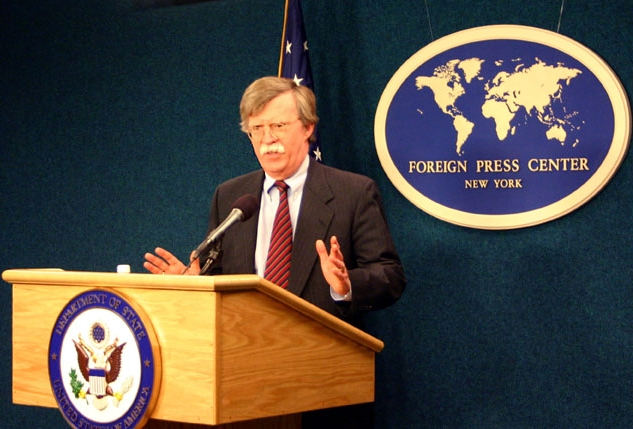
Ambassador Bolton briefing on "The Human Rights Commission and UN Management Reform" at the New York Foreign Press Center

Bolton has been a strong critic of the United Nations for much of his career. Bolton's opposition to the UN was rooted in a disdain for international organizations, which he believed infringed on the sovereignty of the United States. He also opposed the International Criminal Court. In 1994, he stated, "There is no United Nations. There is an international community that occasionally can be led by the only real power left in the world, and that's the United States, when it suits our interests and when we can get others to go along."

He also stated that "The Secretariat Building in New York has 38 stories. If you lost ten stories today, it wouldn't make a bit of difference." When pressed on the statement during the confirmation process, he responded, "There's not a bureaucracy in the world that couldn't be made leaner." However, in a paper on U.S. participation in the UN, Bolton stated "the United Nations can be a useful instrument in the conduct of American foreign policy." On other occasions, Bolton has made remarks critical of the UN, such as that "If I were redoing the Security Council today, I'd have one permanent member because that's the real reflection of the distribution of power in the world", that member being the United States.

=== European Union ===
Bolton is a critic of the European Union. In his book Surrender Is Not an Option, he criticized the EU for pursuing "the endless process of diplomatic mastication" rather than satisfactorily solving problems, and he labeled the organization's diplomats as "EUroids". He has also criticized the EU for advancing what he considers liberal policies. Bolton campaigned in Ireland against further EU integration in 2008, and he criticized the Treaty of Lisbon for expanding EU powers. In 2016, Bolton praised the UK's referendum vote to leave the EU, and Axios reported in January 2019 that Bolton continued to advocate for a hard Brexit as National Security Advisor. In a March 2019 interview with Sky News, Bolton criticized the UK "political class" for not implementing the Brexit vote.

In February 2025, Bolton criticised Trump administration officials for publicly attacking European allies while avoiding similar public pressure on Russia or China, warning that it could have long-term consequences. During the 2026 Iran war, Bolton criticised European governments for not joining the U.S.-Israeli war effort, arguing that Iran posed a nuclear threat to Europe and that reluctance could encourage Trump to weaken U.S. support for Ukraine.

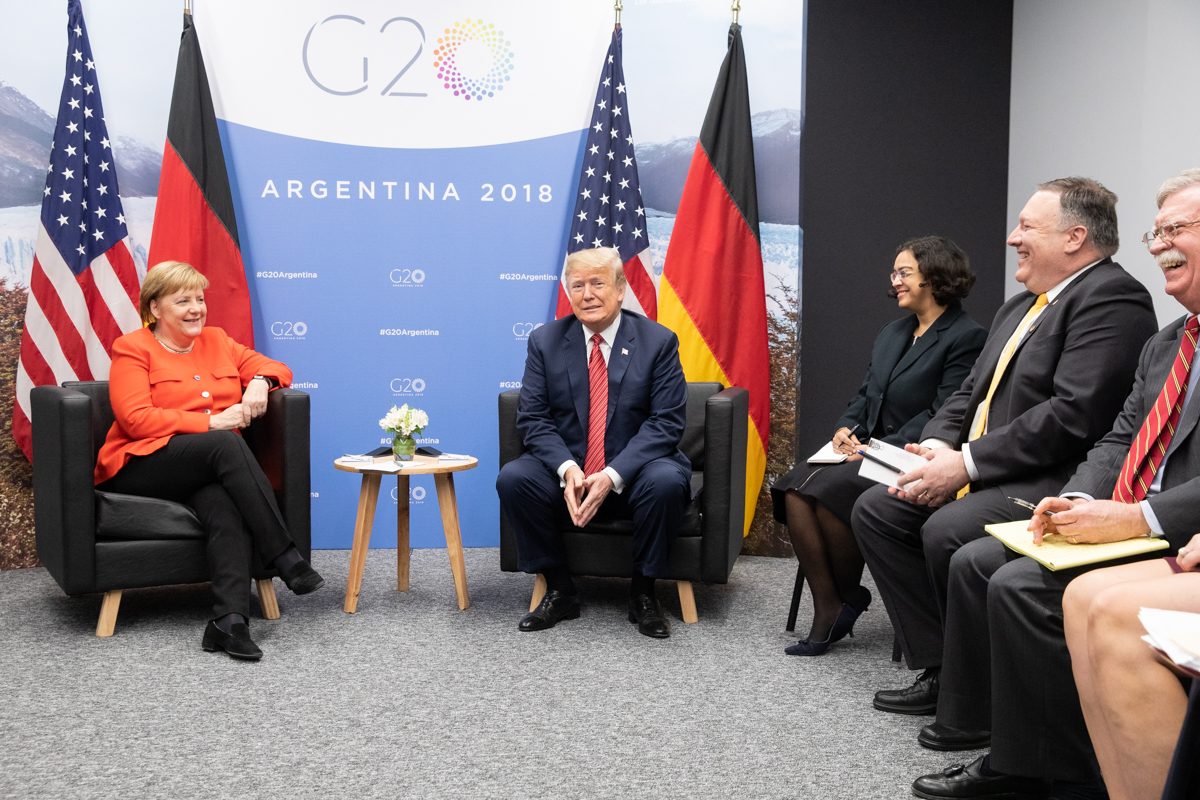
Bolton, President Trump and German Chancellor Angela Merkel at the G20 Summit in Buenos Aires, December 1, 2018

=== Targeted killings of terrorist leaders ===
In September 2011, when the Obama administration declared the death of Al Qaeda target and American-born radical Anwar al-Awlaki in Yemen, Bolton commented "I think it's important as individual Al Qaeda figures and other terrorists are killed that we not read more into it than there is. Consider this analogy if you were around in the 1920s and somebody said, my God, Vladimir Lenin is dead. The Bolsheviks will never recover from this...So while Al-Awlaki's death is significant, I would not read cosmic consequences into it."

=== Whistleblowers ===
Bolton has called for the execution of whistleblowers such as Edward Snowden and Chelsea Manning. Bolton accused Snowden of treason, stating that "Snowden committed treason, he ought to be convicted of that, and then he ought to swing from a tall oak tree". He has stated that he hopes Julian Assange gets "at least 176 years in jail", and that Manning should be "punished to the fullest extent possible", when asked to elaborate he said that he meant "death".

=== Libya ===
Bolton opposed the deal that George W. Bush made with then Libyan leader Muammar Gaddafi to eliminate the country's weapons of mass destruction program. He was in a key role during initial negotiations but his role became limited over time. According to a 2005 study, Bolton was intentionally kept out of the loop so a final agreement could be reached: "Bolton reportedly was unaware of the December 19 WMD agreement until very shortly before its public announcement. And after initially being given a lead role in implementing it, he pushed so hard to backtrack from the agreement that the British convinced the Bush administration to restrict his involvement in the Libya matter."

Bolton supported the NATO-led military intervention in Libya that toppled the regime of Muammar Gaddafi.

=== Iraq ===
Bolton is regarded to be an "architect" of the Iraq War. In 1998, he was a signatory to a letter sent to President Bill Clinton urging him to remove Saddam Hussein from power using U.S. diplomatic, political and military power. He supported the U.S.-led invasion of Iraq that toppled the regime of Saddam Hussein and continued to stand by his support of the invasion by 2018. In 2007, Bolton said the only mistake the United States made with regard to Iraq was to not leave earlier after the overthrow of Saddam Hussein and tell the Iraqis "Here's a copy of the Federalist Papers. Good luck."

In March 2023, Bolton defended the decision to invade Iraq, claiming that there were concerns that Saddam Hussein would pursue nuclear weapons and provide them to terrorist groups.

=== Kosovo ===
During 2008, Bolton opposed the declaration of independence by Kosovo. In 2018 he said, "US policy is that if the two parties can work it out between themselves and reach agreement, we don't exclude territorial adjustments," and that the US or Europe would not "stand in the way if the two parties to the dispute reached a mutually satisfactory settlement."

=== Western Sahara ===
In July 2025, Bolton suggested that Algeria offer Donald Trump a gift so that he would abandon American recognition of Moroccan sovereignty over annexed Western Sahara.

=== Israel ===
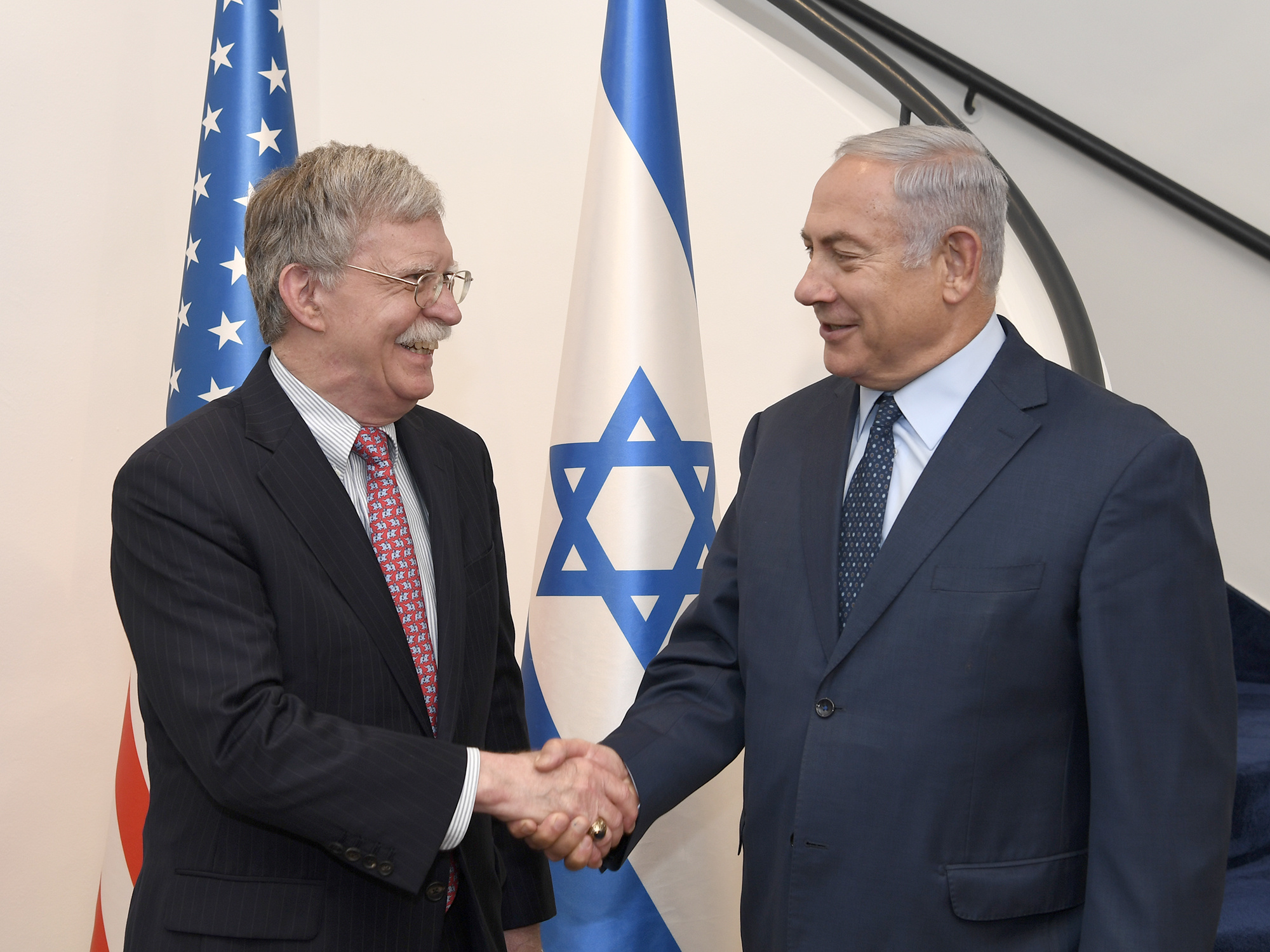
Bolton greeting Israeli Prime Minister Benjamin Netanyahu in August 2018

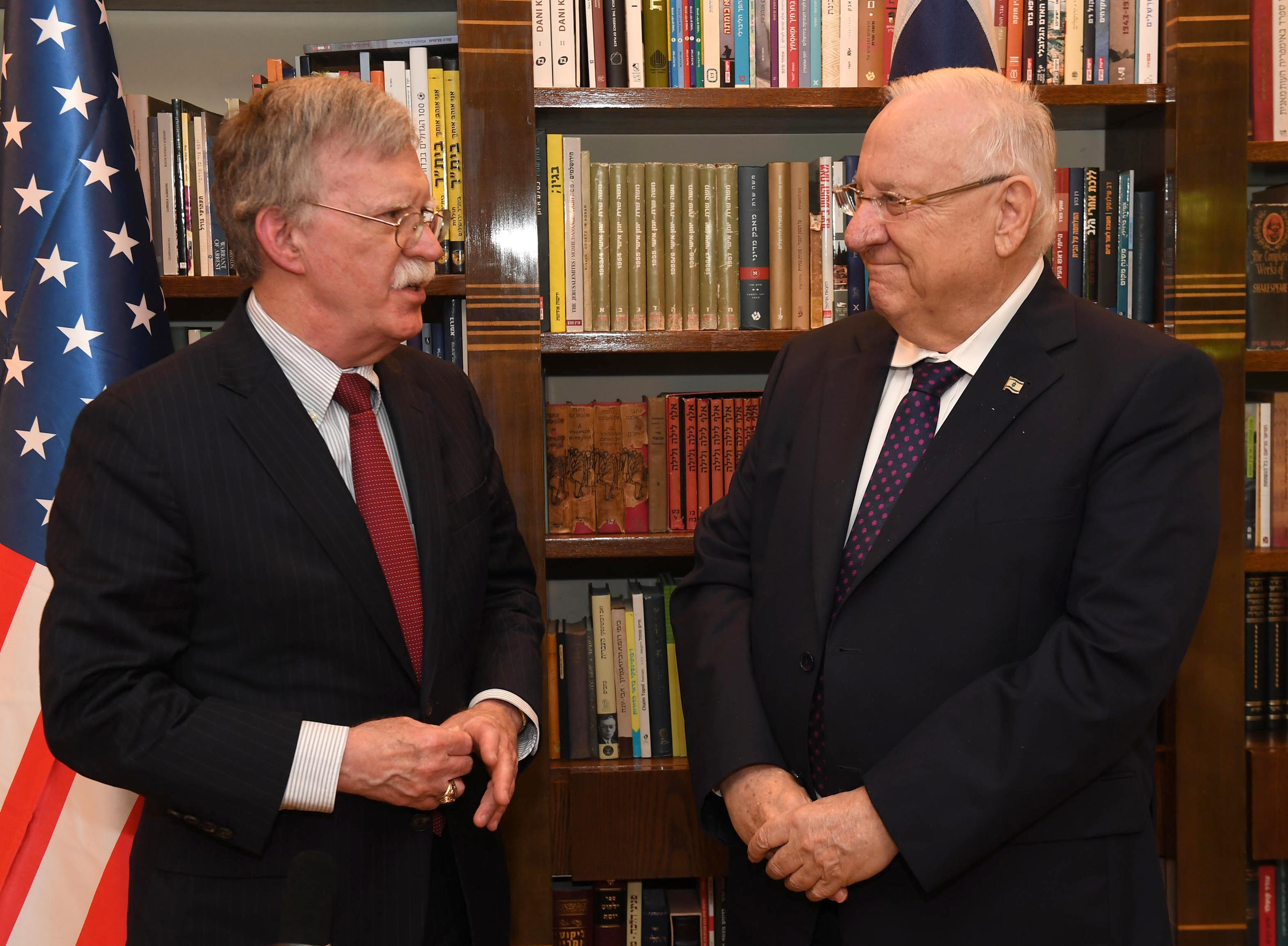
Bolton with Israeli President Reuven Rivlin in August 2018

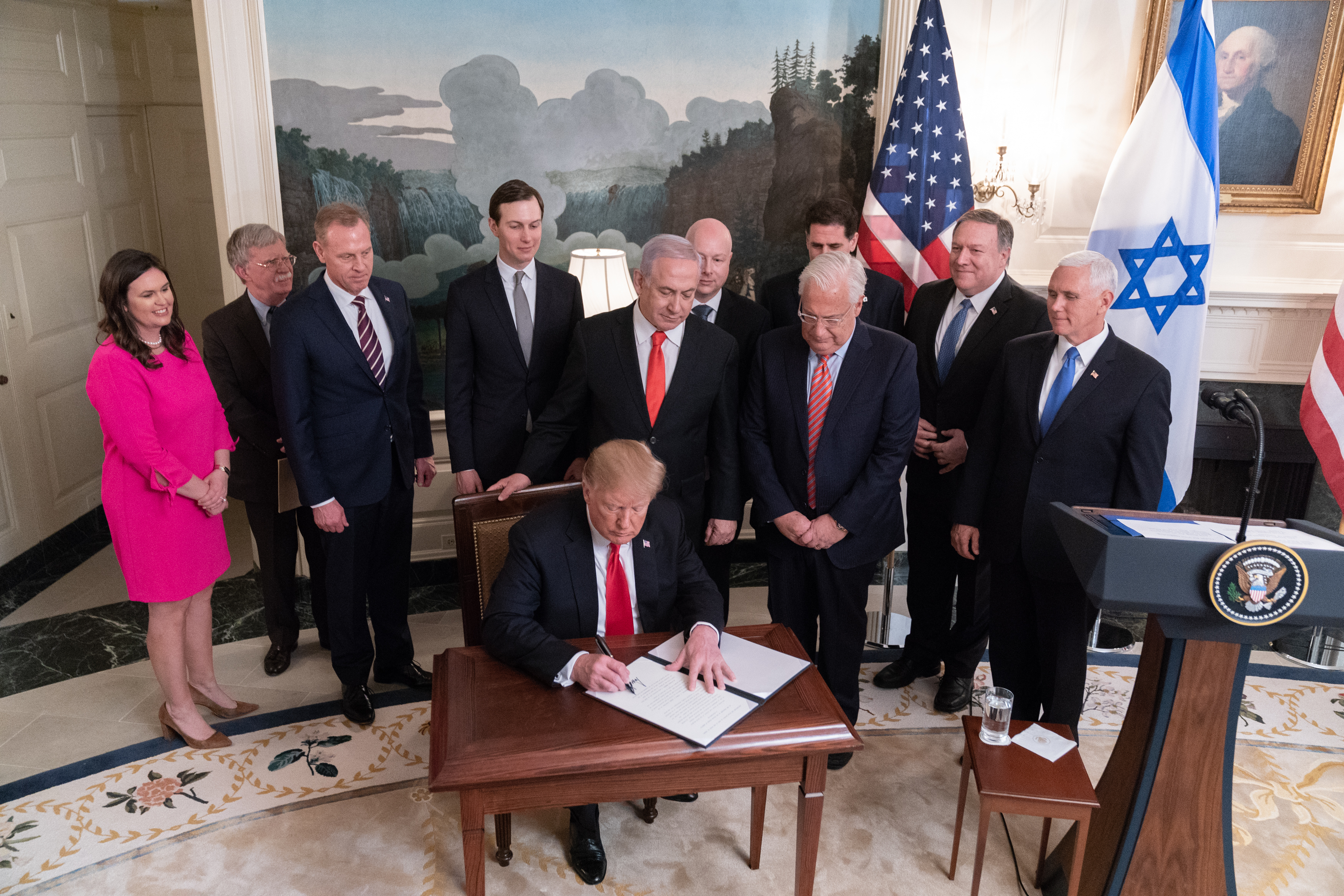
President Trump, joined by Bolton and Netanyahu behind, signs the proclamation recognizing Israel's 1981 annexation of the Golan Heights, March 25, 2019.

Bolton is known for his strong support for Israel. Bolton opposes the two-state solution of creating an independent Palestinian state alongside the existing state of Israel. Bolton supported moving the U.S. embassy in Israel to Jerusalem in accordance with the Jerusalem Embassy Act, and he testified in front of Congress in 2017 on the matter. In 2010, Bolton co-founded the Friends of Israel Initiative with 12 other international figures.

Bolton supports what he calls the "Three State Solution" in order to determine the political status of Gaza and the West Bank. Under Bolton's Three State Solution, Israel would annex settlements it has built in the West Bank since the conclusion of the Six-Days War in 1967, Egypt would annex and administer the Gaza Strip, and Jordan would annex and administer the remaining portion of the West Bank not annexed by Israel. Bolton's Three State proposal would not result in the creation of an independent Palestinian state.

Bolton opposed the 2023 Gaza war ceasefire. In December 2023, he proposed resettling Palestinians from Gaza. In April 2024, Bolton said that the Gaza war "is an Iranian war against Israel, fought through terrorist proxies", and the only way to end the suffering of the people of Gaza "is to eliminate Hamas, which is the cause of the suffering."

=== North Korea and Iran ===
Bolton has advocated for pre-emptive strikes against North Korea and Iran. In March 2018, he suggested that South Korea take North Korea and terminate the North Korean regime as the only "diplomatic option", and said that the war between the two countries is their problem and not the United States' problem.

In 2006, Bolton attempted to bring prosecution against Iranian president Mahmoud Ahmadinejad for incitement to genocide in the International Court of Justice, along with Alan Dershowitz, Dore Gold, and other experts from the United States, Canada, and Israel, based on Ahmadinejad's comments that "Israel must be wiped off the map".

In 2008, Bolton said: "The idea here is not to have much larger hostilities, but to stop the Iranians from engaging in the hostilities that they're already doing against us inside Iraq. And they're doing much the same by aiding the Taliban in Afghanistan. So this is not provocative or preemptive, this is entirely responsive on our part." In 2018, Bolton stated: "Russia, China, Syria, Iran, North Korea. These are regimes that make agreements and lie about them. A national security policy that is based on the faith that regimes like that will honor their commitments is doomed to failure." He also said, "Our goal should be regime change in Iran." The New Yorker described the people who have worked with Bolton as saying "he is focused less on North Korea than on Iran". H. R. McMaster has reportedly told Dexter Fikins that Bolton has had "[the] anal focus on Iran for twenty years".

Unlike several of President Trump's early national security officials like National Security Adviser H.R. McMaster and Secretary of State Rex Tillerson, Bolton campaigned to press President Trump for a complete withdrawal from the 2015 nuclear deal with Iran (the JCPOA) and rejected the idea it could be fixed. Unable at the time to directly present his position to President Trump, Bolton published his proposal on how to withdraw from the Iran deal in an August 28, 2017 National Review Online article. After he was named to succeed McMaster as Nation Security Adviser in April 2018, Bolton pressed the President to withdraw from the Iran nuclear deal, a decision President Trump announced a month later. Bolton has been one of the biggest anti-Iran hawks in the Trump administration.

Speaking to a meeting of Iranian exile group Mujahedin-e-Khalq in March 2018, Bolton said the Trump administration should follow the goal of regime change in Iran and that "before 2019, we here will celebrate in Tehran!"

In 2019, Bolton, Israeli Prime Minister Benjamin Netanyahu and Secretary of State Mike Pompeo successfully sabotaged Trump's attempts to open diplomatic channels with Iran.

On January 3, 2020, the high-level Iranian General, Qasem Soleimani, was killed in a U.S. drone strike, which considerably heightened the existing tensions between the two countries. In a tweet, Bolton called the airstrike a "long in the making, this was a decisive blow against Iran's malign Quds Force activities worldwide. Hope this is the first step to regime change in Tehran."

In early 2026, Bolton actively defended joint U.S.-Israeli military strikes against Iran, describing them as "justifiable and necessary" to achieve regime change. He argued that destroying the Iranian regime was the only way to eliminate its nuclear threat.

In January and February 2026, Bolton continued to argue that an Iranian regime change could be pursued without a large ground invasion, instead by striking instruments of Iranian state power, including the IRGC and Basij militia. In March and April 2026, he criticised Trump's Iran-war planning and ceasefire approach, opposing an extended ceasefire and supporting militarily reopening the strait rather than making concessions to Tehran. In June 2026, Bolton criticised a reported U.S.-Iran framework deal, saying Iran had outmanoeuvred Trump and that the United States had sacrificed strategic leverage to reopen the Strait of Hormuz and lower energy prices.

==== People's Mujahedin of Iran ====
Prior to it being de-listed by the U.S. as a Foreign Terrorist Organization in 2012, Bolton spoke in favor of the People's Mujahedin of Iran (also known as the Mujahedin-e Khalq, or MEK), MEK has opposed the Iranian theocratic state since shortly after the 1979 Iranian Revolution. According to his financial disclosure, he was given $40,000 for his 2016 speech to MEK. According to the 5 U.S.C. app. § 101-required 'US Public Financial Disclosure Report' (2018) for Bolton, released by Al-Monitor, he has received $40,000 of speaking fee for "Global Events–European Iranian Events" on June 1, 2017, the same day he made a speech for the MEK in a gathering in Paris, France.

=== Russia ===
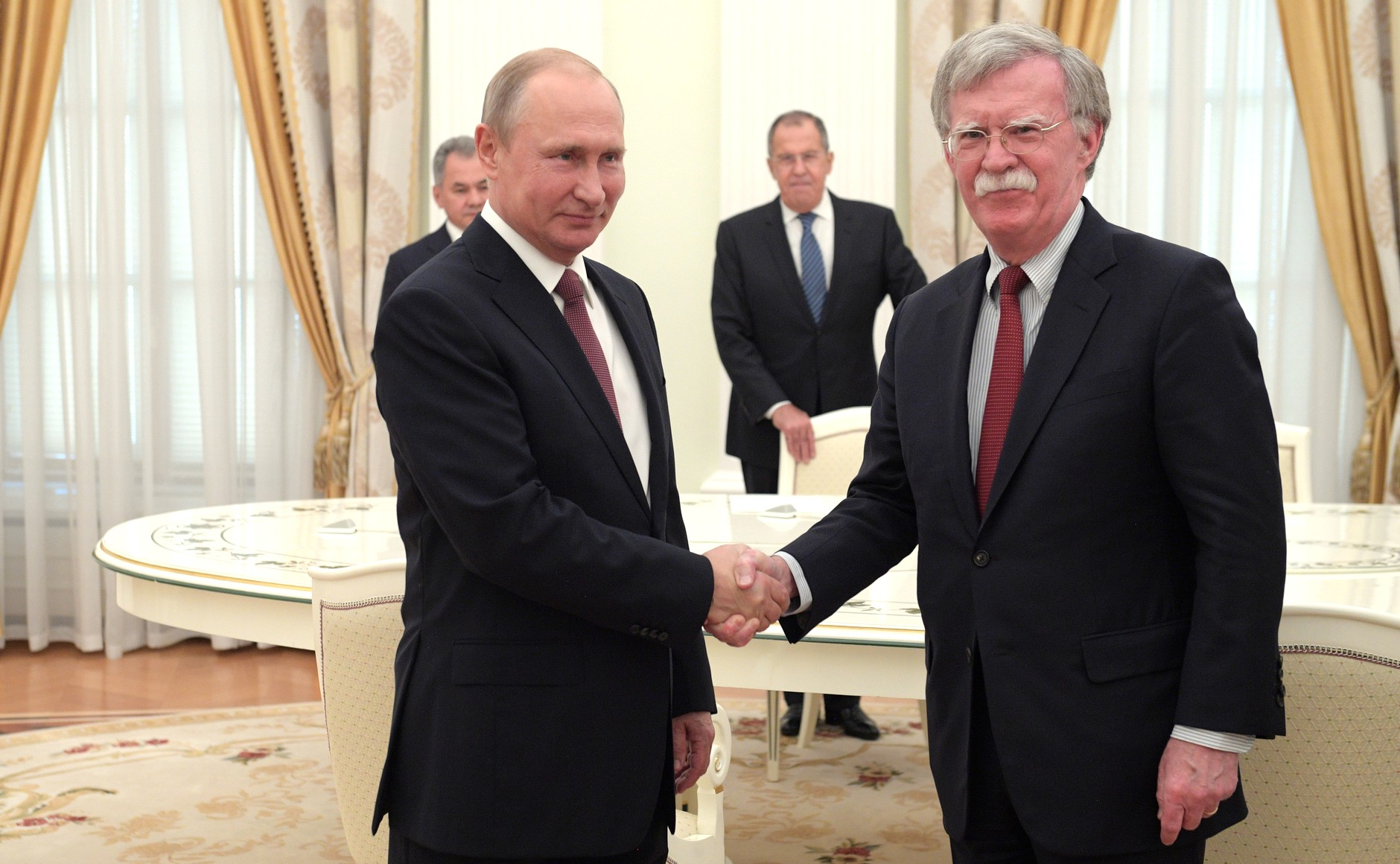
Bolton with Russian President Vladimir Putin in June 2018

In 2013, after NSA whistleblower Edward Snowden had been granted asylum in Russia, Bolton said: "I think in order to focus Putin's thinking, we need to do things that cause him pain as well. And while I know that not having a chance to have a bilateral meeting with his buddy Barack Obama will cause Putin to lose sleep, it's not damaging Russian interests." Bolton accused Snowden of treason, stating that "Snowden committed treason, he ought to be convicted of that, and then he ought to swing from a tall oak tree".

Russian Senator Aleksey Pushkov, former chairman of the State Duma Committee on International Affairs, said after Bolton's appointment: "Bolton, along with Bush, Cheney and Rumsfeld, was an ardent supporter of the war in Iraq. A supporter of jihadists for the sake of overthrowing [Syrian President Bashar al-Assad]. A great specialist in interventions and aggression, and adept at the use of force. McMaster is a general. Bolton is the ideologue of a new cold war, a convinced opponent of Russia."

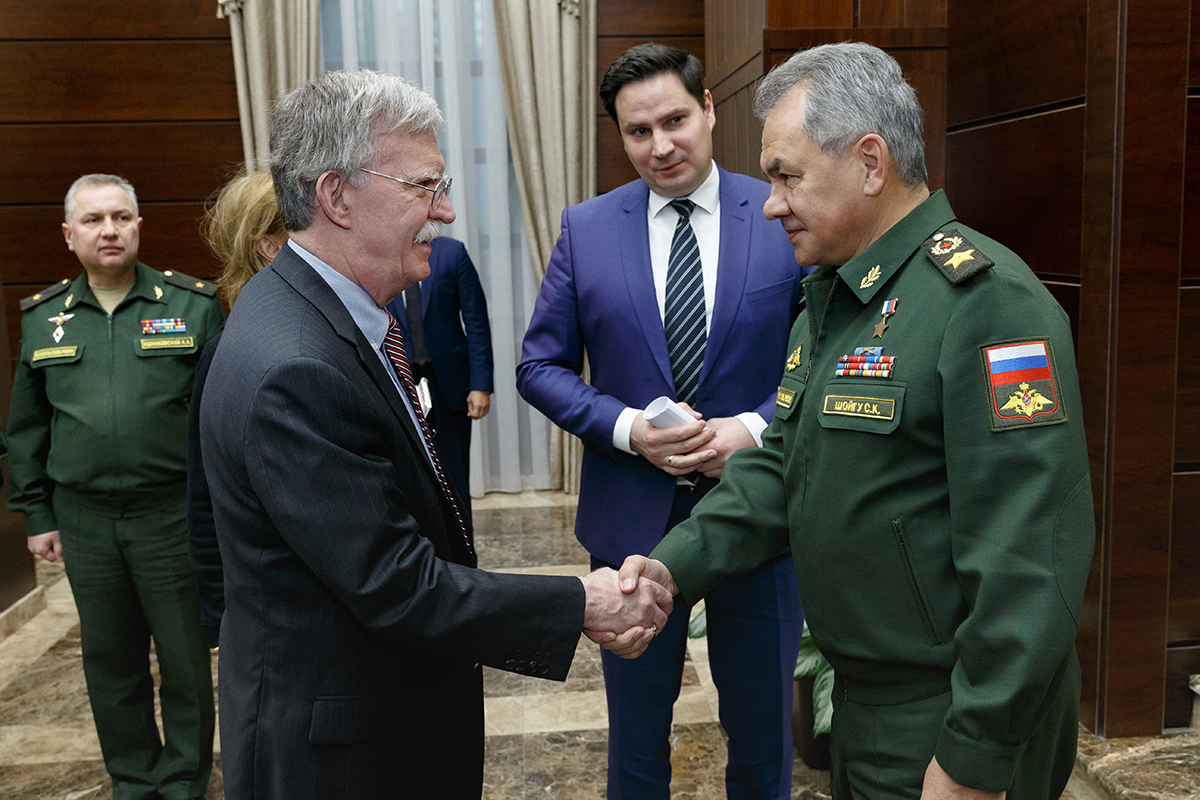
Bolton meets with Russian Defense Minister Sergey Shoygu in Moscow in October 2018.

In a June 2017 article entitled "Vladimir Putin looked Trump in the eye and lied to him. We negotiate with Russia at our peril," Bolton called Russian interference in the 2016 United States elections "a true act of war." As Trump's national security advisor in July 2018, Bolton referred to the investigation into the Russian interference as "the Russia witch hunt".

In a December 2021 article entitled "Now Is the Time for NATO to Stand Up to Russia," Bolton called for an aggressive response to Moscow's troops build-up along the Ukraine border, before the full-scale invasion commenced in February 2022.

On July 6, 2023, U.S. President Joe Biden approved the provision of cluster munitions to Ukraine. Bolton hailed the decision as "an excellent idea".

In February 2025, Bolton opposed a hasty Ukraine settlement and warned that a peacekeeping force freezing the front lines could amount to a de facto partition of Ukraine. In November 2025, Bolton criticised a reported US-Russia Ukraine peace plan and said Trump did not care about Ukraine.

=== China ===
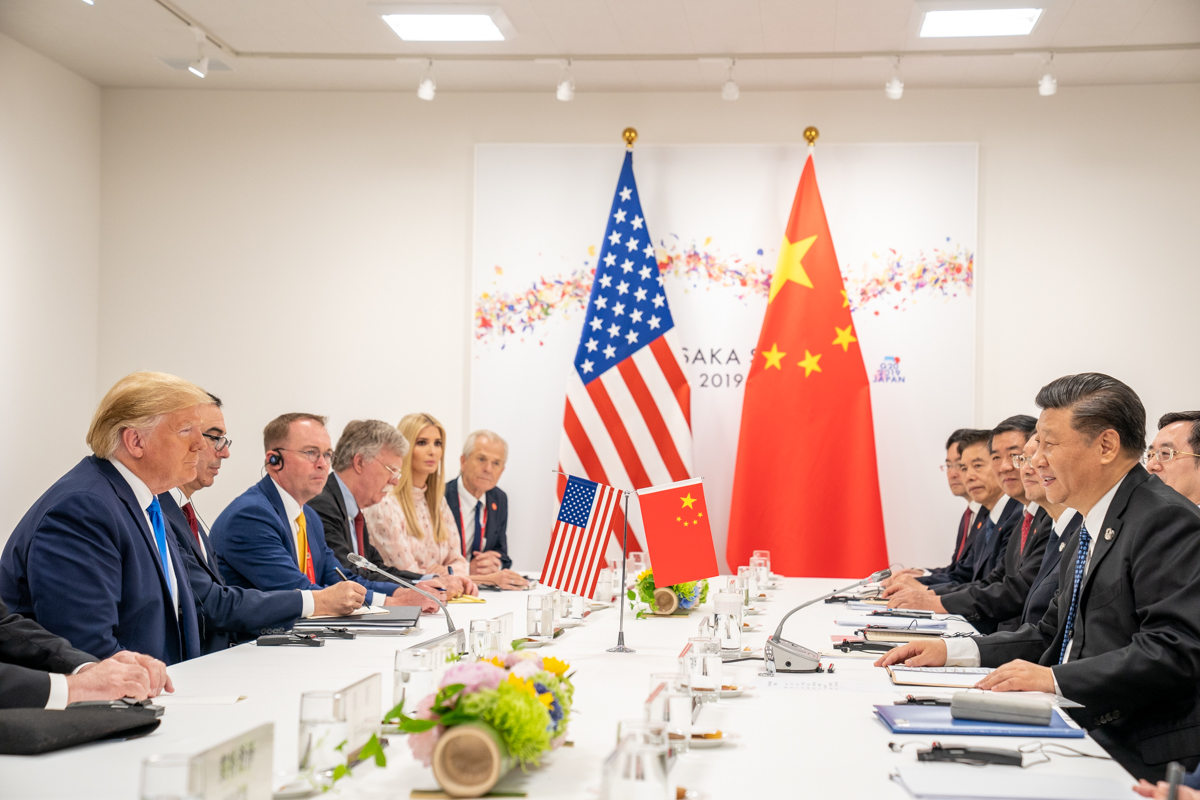
Bolton, President Trump and Chinese leader Xi Jinping at the G20 Summit in Osaka, June 28, 2019

In 2018, Bolton criticized Washington's One-China policy, under which Taiwan, officially known as the Republic of China, is not recognized as an independent nation, with recognition being given only to the People's Republic of China.

On China's notoriety in intellectual property matters, he remarked in 2018 that "There's simply no excuse for the stealing of intellectual property, forced technology transfers it's sometimes called."

Bolton said in October 2018 that the United States' need to counter a Chinese arms buildup in the Pacific, including within South China Sea, was one of the reasons for their move to withdraw from the Intermediate-Range Nuclear Forces Treaty with Russia, because China is not a signatory to the treaty.

On January 20, 2021, the Chinese government imposed sanctions against Bolton and 27 other Trump administration officials that "planned, promoted and executed a series of crazy moves, gravely interfered in China's internal affairs, undermined China's interests, offended the Chinese people, and seriously disrupted China-U.S. relations". The sanctions ban them from entering China, including Hong Kong and Macau, and restrict companies and institutions associated with them from doing business in China.

=== India ===
In September 2025, Bolton criticized Trump's 50% tariff imposed on India over India's trade with Russia and questioned why similar tariff measures weren’t applied to China, Turkey, or Pakistan. He also criticized Trump's claim about his role in peace between India and Pakistan after the 2025 Pahalgam Attack and the subsequent 2025 India-Pakistan conflict.

=== Latin America ===
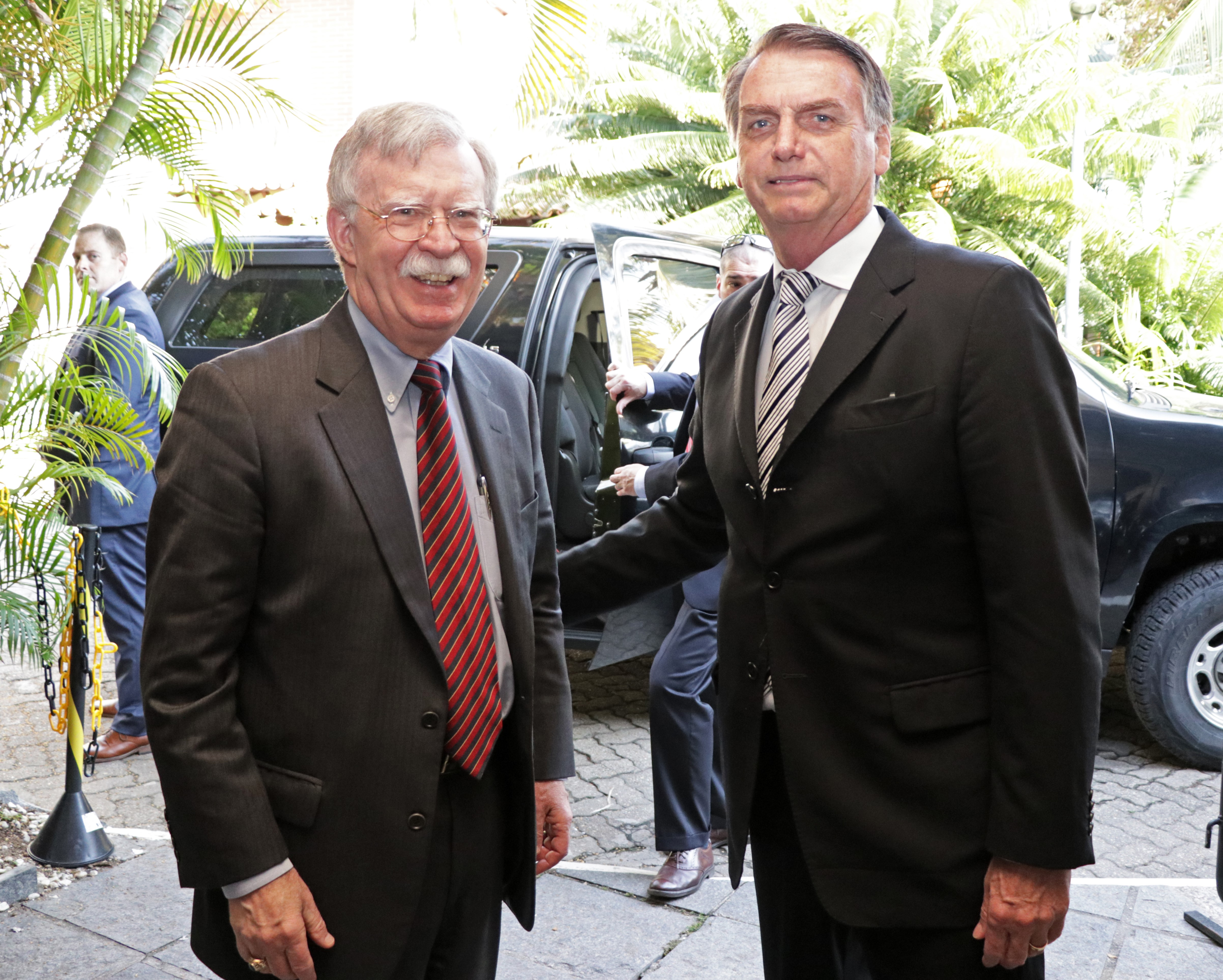
Bolton with Brazil's president-elect Jair Bolsonaro in Rio de Janeiro in November 2018

In a speech as National Security Advisor on November 1, 2018, Bolton praised Brazil's president-elect Jair Bolsonaro and Colombia's president Iván Duque Márquez, both right-wing conservatives, calling them "like-minded" partners. In the speech, he also framed Bolsonaro's election victory as a "positive sign" for Latin America, and he criticized Cuba, Venezuela, and Nicaragua as a "troika of tyranny."

=== Criticism of the Obama administration ===
In December 2012, Bolton suggested that Secretary of State Hillary Clinton had faked a concussion to avoid testifying before Congress regarding the attack on the U.S. Consulate in Benghazi, Libya. Bolton stated "When you don't want to go to a meeting or conference or an event you have a 'diplomatic illness'. And this is a diplomatic illness to beat the band."

In 2010, he wrote a foreword for the book The Post-American Presidency: The Obama Administration's War on America, authored by far-right anti-Muslim commentators Pamela Geller and Robert Spencer. Bolton endorsed their book, writing: "This book carries forward the ongoing and increasingly widespread critique of Barack Obama as our first post-American president. What it recounts is disturbing, and its broader implications are more disturbing still."

== Alleged assassination plot ==
On August 10, 2022, an Iranian national and member of Iran's Islamic Revolutionary Guard Corps, Shahram Poursafi, was charged by the United States Department of Justice in an October 2021 plot to allegedly murder Bolton, likely in retaliation for the January 2020 death of Qasem Soleimani. In response to the plot, Bolton was granted a protective detail from the United States Secret Service on the orders of President Joe Biden. This protection was later rescinded by President Trump upon his return to office on January 20, 2025.

== Personal life ==
Bolton married Christina Bolton in 1972; they divorced in 1983. He has been married to Gretchen Smith Bolton, a financial planner with AXA Advisors, since January 1986. She was born in Kansas City in 1945 and had been married once before, divorcing in 1973. Together they have a daughter, Jennifer, and have resided in Bethesda, Maryland since 1986. Bolton is a Lutheran.

== Bibliography ==
- Surrender Is Not an Option: Defending America at the United Nations and Abroad. Threshold Editions, Simon & Schuster. 2007. ISBN 978-1416552840.
- How Barack Obama Is Endangering Our National Sovereignty. Encounter Books. 2010. ISBN 978-1594034916.
- The Room Where It Happened. Simon & Schuster. 2020. ISBN 978-1982148034

Legal offices
Preceded by Richard K. Willard	United States Assistant Attorney General for the Civil Division; 1988–1989	Succeeded by Stuart M. Gerson
Political offices
Preceded by Richard Williamson	Assistant Secretary of State for International Organization Affairs; 1989–1993	Succeeded by Doug Bennet
Preceded by John Holum	Under Secretary of State for Arms Control and International Security Affairs; 2001–2005	Succeeded by Robert Joseph
Preceded by H. R. McMaster	National Security Advisor; 2018–2019	Succeeded by Charles Kupperman; Acting
Diplomatic posts
Preceded by Anne Patterson; Acting	United States Ambassador to the United Nations; 2005–2006	Succeeded by Alejandro Wolff; Acting
