= Danville River District =

The Danville River District is a development project undertaken in the early 21st century by the City of Danville, Virginia; it is aimed at revitalizing the aging Danville Historic District and Tobacco Warehouse District. In partnership with private investors and with state funding, the city is beautifying its riverfront district to add a pedestrian walkway and visitor amenities. The city envisions the area as a venue for many local fairs, festivals and other events.

== Amenities ==
Planned amenities include:

- Riverwalk Trail
- Dan River access
- Historic Architecture
- The Crossing at the Dan
- Broadband

== Public Sector projects ==
Several individual projects have been undertaken towards the goal of an improved river district.

=== Streetscape ===
A streetscape project along Main Street began in the Summer of 2012. The project features wider sidewalks, installation of brick pavers and creation of more visible and safer pedestrian crossings. It also will provide amenities such as outdoor café space, trees, benches, and new lighting. Land Planning & Design Associates (LPDA), a Virginia-based landscape architecture and planning consulting firm, designed the streetscape project.

The first phase focuses on Main Street from Memorial Drive and Craghead Street to Floyd Street, and on North Union Street from Main Street to Spring Street. In addition to installing a storm drainage system, the project will reduce the number of traffic lanes on Main Street from three to two by eliminating the center turn lane. This change will allow for the wider sidewalks and a more pedestrian-friendly environment.

=== Main Street Plaza ===
A former one-way road leading to the Martin Luther King Jr. Memorial Bridge has been closed to traffic permanently as a pedestrian plaza is under construction. JTI Leaf Services is donating $400,000 for a fountain that will be included in the plaza.

=== Downtowner demolition ===
The first phase of the streetscape project began with the demolition of the Downtowner Motor Inn. The inn was an outdated eyesore that had been abandoned since 1986. Constructed in 1963 at the corner of Main and Union streets, the Inn stood seven stories high and featured 116 rental rooms, a rooftop penthouse, 15 meeting rooms, elevators, a restaurant, a nightclub, and commercial tenant spaces. Because of its high visibility, the building became a focal point for blight in the River District, as it stood empty for almost 30 years.

Today, 501 Main Street is home to a blank canvas green space (See:Live Web Camera), which use is still to be determined. The Danville Industrial Development Authority (IDA) purchased the privately owned lot above the site and created 30 spaces with the use of about 15 feet of the Downtowner lot. LPDA has drafted design concepts for the future use of the Downtowner lot, but no decisions have been officially announced.

=== Branding ===
To tie all of this together, the city has hired consultants who are guiding the process of creating a branding platform for the River District. A wayfinding signage project will accompany the branding effort. This portion of the project will be revealed in the Summer of 2014.

== History ==
This area has been the commercial and administrative heart of the city since the 1790s. The Dan River and the River District are what distinguish Danville from thousands of other communities competing to attract new residents and businesses. With many of Danville's oldest, most architecturally attractive and significant buildings, it is the most important gathering place for community events.

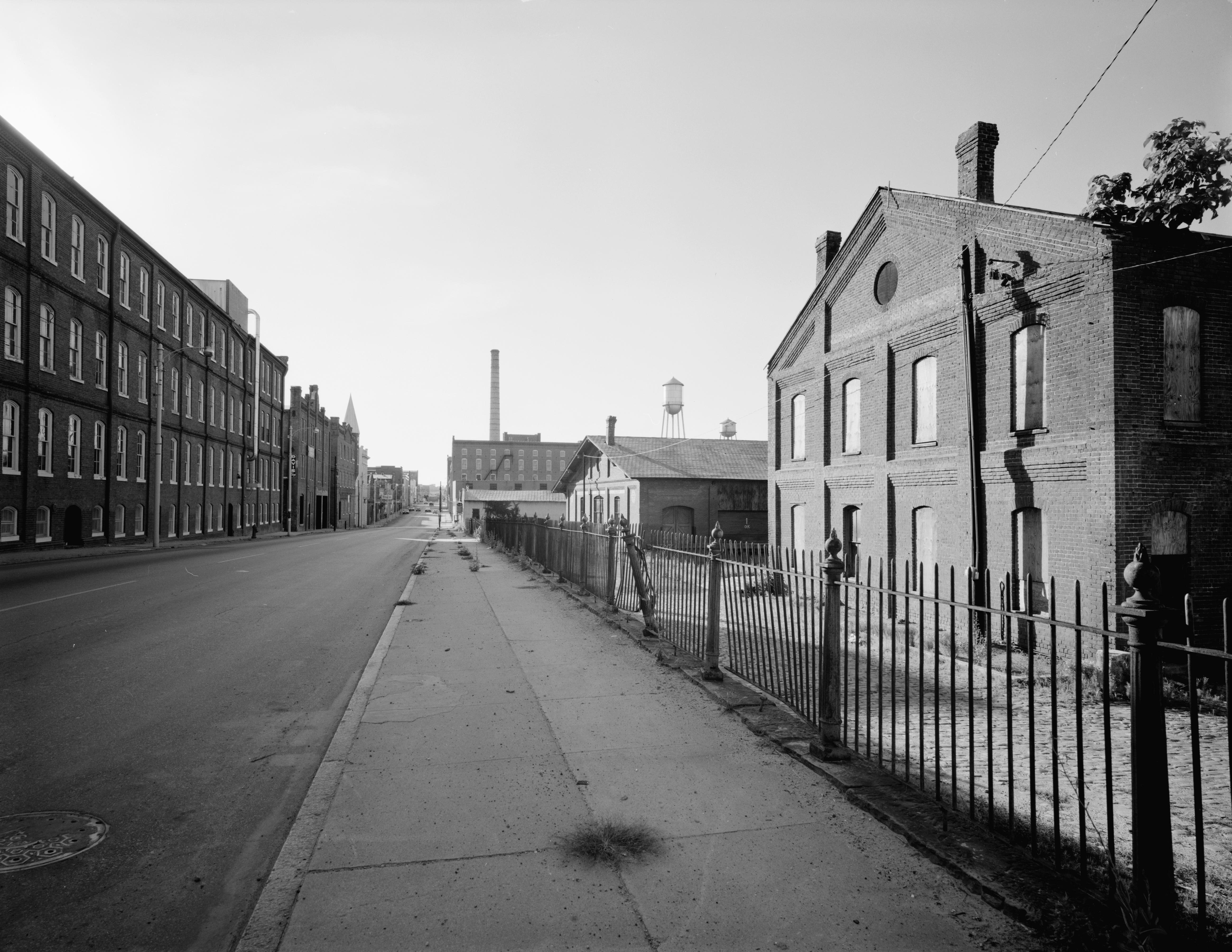
Craghead Street, Danville, Virginia

Danville had an economic peak during and era of textiles and tobacco. Due to restructuring of these industries, many of the downtown and tobacco buildings have been left empty, as the area lost its purpose as the community's commercial center.

== See also ==
- Danville, Virginia
- National Register of Historic Places listings in Danville, Virginia
