= WAKG =

- Danville, Virginia; United States
- Broadcast area: Southside Virginia
- Frequency: 103.3 MHz
- Branding: 103.3 WAKG

Programming
- Format: Country
- Affiliations: Performance Racing Network

Ownership
- Owner: Piedmont Broadcasting Corporation
- Sister stations: WBTM

History
- First air date: June 3, 1968
- Former call signs: WBTM-FM (1968–1973)

Technical information
- Licensing authority: FCC
- Facility ID: 52545
- Class: C1
- ERP: 100,000 watts
- HAAT: 199 meters (653 ft)
- Transmitter coordinates: 36°44′28.0″N 79°23′5.0″W

Links
- Public license information: Public file; LMS
- Webcast: Listen live
- Website: WAKG.com

WAKG (103.3 FM) is a commercial radio station licensed to Danville, Virginia, United States, and serving Southside Virginia. It broadcasts a country music format and is owned by the Piedmont Broadcasting Corporation. It is an affiliate of the Performance Racing Network and the Motor Racing Network, airing its NASCAR races on weekends. The studios and offices are on Grove Street in Danville.

The transmitter is on Tower Lane in Blairs, Virginia, near U.S. Route 29. The coverage area stretches from the suburbs of Roanoke and Lynchburg to the north and Greensboro and Durham to the south.

== History ==
The station signed on the air on June 3, 1968. The original call sign was WBTM-FM, the sister station to WBTM 1330 AM. They have always been owned by Piedmont Broadcasting. In WAKG's early years, the two stations simulcast a full service radio format, a mix of Middle of the Road music, local news and sports. They were affiliates of the ABC Entertainment Network.

In 1973, the stations separated their programming. WBTM continued its full service format while the FM station became WAKG. It had an automated beautiful music format. WAKG played quarter hour sweeps of instrumental cover versions of popular songs, along with Broadway and Hollywood show tunes.

After a few years, WAKG flipped from beautiful music to automated Country music. Over time, live DJs were added to the programming. The station plays a mix of current country hits with some classic country titles.
