= WBTM =

- Danville, Virginia; United States
- Broadcast area: Southern Pittsylvania County, Virginia; Northern Caswell County, North Carolina
- Frequency: 1330 kHz
- Branding: Big Hits 102.5 and 1330 WBTM

Programming
- Format: Adult contemporary
- Affiliations: ABC Radio News; United Stations Radio Networks

Ownership
- Owner: Piedmont Broadcasting Corp.
- Sister stations: WAKG

History
- First air date: May 24, 1930
- Call sign meaning: World's Best Tobacco Market; World's Biggest Textile Mill

Technical information
- Licensing authority: FCC
- Facility ID: 52544
- Class: B
- Power: 5,000 watts (day); 1,000 watts (night)
- Transmitter coordinates: 36°36′26.0″N 79°26′1.0″W
- Translator: 102.5 W273CD (Danville)

Links
- Public license information: Public file; LMS
- Webcast: Listen live
- Website: www.wbtmdanville.com

WBTM is an adult contemporary formatted broadcast radio station licensed to Danville, Virginia, serving Southern Pittsylvania County in Virginia and Northern Caswell County in North Carolina. WBTM is owned and operated by Piedmont Broadcasting Corp.

== History ==
On January 1, 1940, after Lynchburg Broadcasting Corporation gained managerial control of WBTM it began exchanging programs with WLVA in Lynchburg, Virginia, for four hours daily via newly installed lines that connected the two.

== Translator ==
In addition to the main station, WBTM is relayed by an FM translator to widen its broadcast area.

Broadcast translator for WBTM
Call sign	Frequency	City of license	FID	ERP (W)	HAAT	Class	FCC info
W273CD	102.5 FM	Danville, Virginia	5088	140	22.1 m (73 ft)	D	LMS
