= Westover Christian Academy =

Coordinates: 36°35′46.3″N 79°28′58.5″W

- 5665 Riverside Dr; Danville, Virginia 24541; United States

Information
- Type: Private, college preparatory school
- Motto: More than a School
- Religious affiliation: Baptist
- Established: 1979; 47 years ago
- President: Dr. Lance Roberts
- Grades: K–12
- Gender: co-educational
- Enrollment: 460
- Student to teacher ratio: 12:6
- Campus type: Rural
- Colors: Red, White, & Black
- Athletics: 21 Athletic teams
- Athletics conference: Virginia Association of Christian Athletics (VACA); Virginia Independent Schools Athletic Association (VISAA)
- Mascot: Bulldog
- Nickname: Bulldogs
- Accreditation: Association of Christian Schools International; Virginia Council for Private Education; Cognia
- Website: www.westoverchristian.org

Westover Christian Academy is a private, Baptist Christian school located in Danville, Virginia, United States, that teaches pre-K through Grade 12. The school was founded in 1979. Westover serves nearly 460 students.

== History ==
It began operations in 1979 as Southall Christian School. Southall was located at 502 Southampton Ave. on the south side of Danville. Founded on location of Southall Baptist Church, it started as a primary school with the plan to add a grade each year. It graduated its first class in 1986. The class consisted of six students. It continued operations until Southall Baptist merged with Lynn Haven Baptist and moved the school into a newer and more modern facility on the north side of town. The new church, Westover Baptist, and school, Westover Christian Academy took their name from the area of town it was located.
