= Danville, Virginia =

Independent city in Virginia, United States

- Independent city
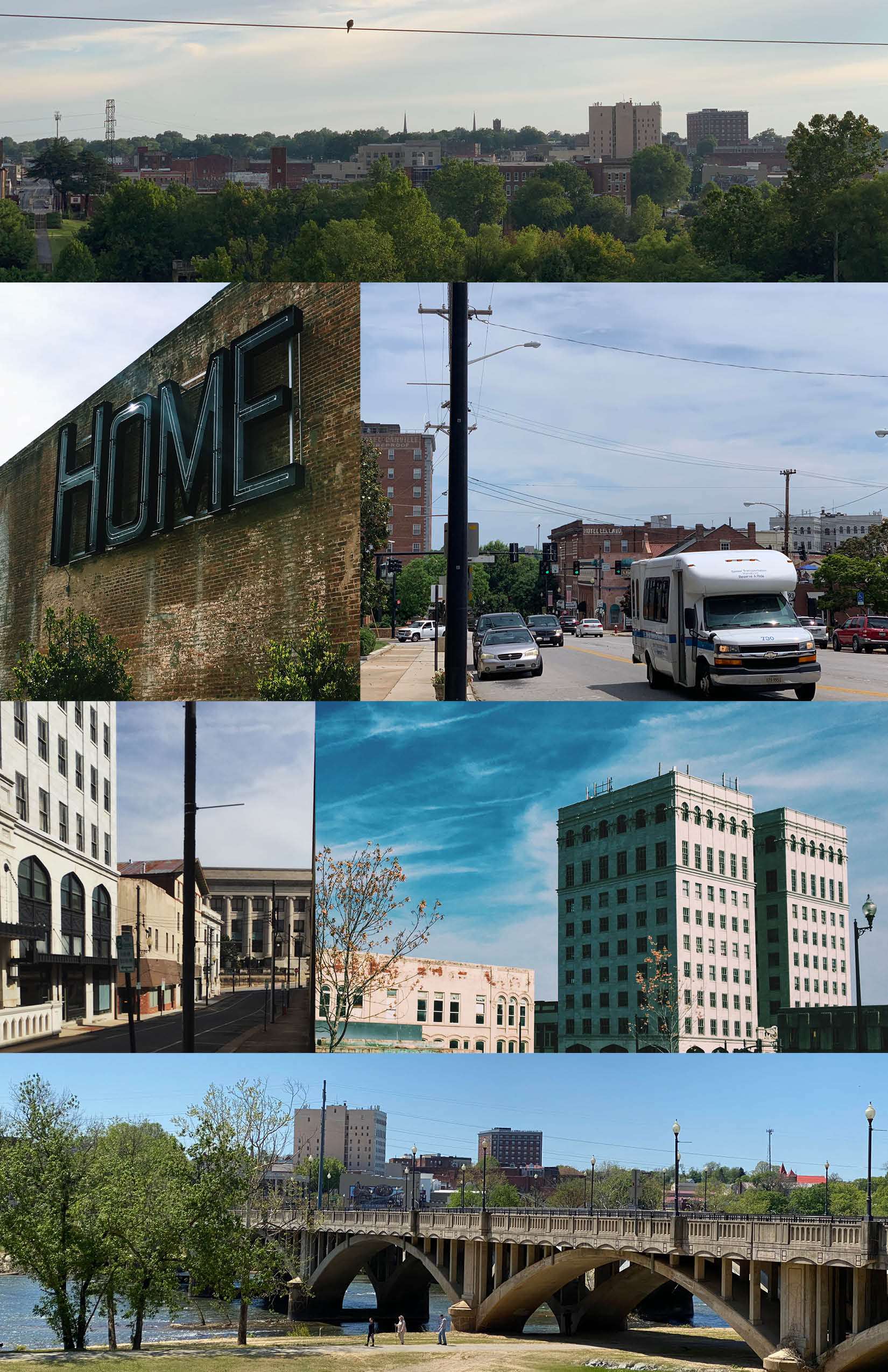
- Worsham Street overlook, Main & Ridge St. intersection, Masonic building (River City Towers), Martin Luther King Jr. Memorial Bridge, municipal building from Union Street, repurposed Dan River Fabrics "Home" sign.(Clockwise from the top)

- Flag Seal Logo
- Nicknames: River City, City of Churches, DanVegas, D'ville
- Motto: Reimagine That
- Location in the Commonwealth of Virginia

- Location of Danville in Virginia Danville (the United States)
- Coordinates: 36°35′14″N 79°24′16″W
- Country: United States
- State: Virginia
- County: None (Independent city)
- Named for: Dan River

Government
  - Type: Council–manager
  - Mayor: Alonzo Jones (I)
  - Vice Mayor: Gary P. Miller
  - Council: Danville City Council

Area
  - Total: 43.70 sq mi (113.19 km^{2})
  - Land: 42.80 sq mi (110.84 km^{2})
  - Water: 0.90 sq mi (2.34 km^{2})
- Elevation: 531 ft (162 m)

Population (2020)
  - Total: 42,590
  - Estimate (2025): 41,647 ▼
  - Density: 995.2/sq mi (384.2/km^{2})
- Demonym: Danvillian
- Time zone: UTC−5 (EST)
  - Summer (DST): UTC−4 (EDT)
- ZIP Code: 24540-24541, 24543
- Area code: 434
- FIPS code: 51-21344
- GNIS feature ID: 1492837
- Website: www.danville-va.gov

Danville is an independent city in the Commonwealth of Virginia in the United States. The city is located in the Southside Virginia region and on the fall line of the Dan River.

The city was a center of tobacco production and was an area of Confederate activity during the American Civil War, due to its strategic location on the Richmond and Danville Railroad. In April 1865, Danville briefly served as the third and final capital of the Confederacy before its surrender later that year.

Danville has maintained a black majority population since the Reconstruction era. During this time, the city was represented politically by black members of the Readjuster Party. However, this changed following the Danville Massacre of 1883, after which Democrats regained control both locally and statewide. Decades later, during the civil rights era, Danville again became a flashpoint for racial violence and resistance to desegregation efforts.

Danville is the principal city of the Danville, Virginia Micropolitan Statistical Area. The Bureau of Economic Analysis combines the city of Danville with surrounding Pittsylvania County for statistical purposes. The population was 42,590 at the 2020 census. It is bounded by Pittsylvania County to the north and Caswell County, North Carolina to the south. It hosts the Danville Otterbots baseball club of the Appalachian League.

== History ==
=== 18th century ===
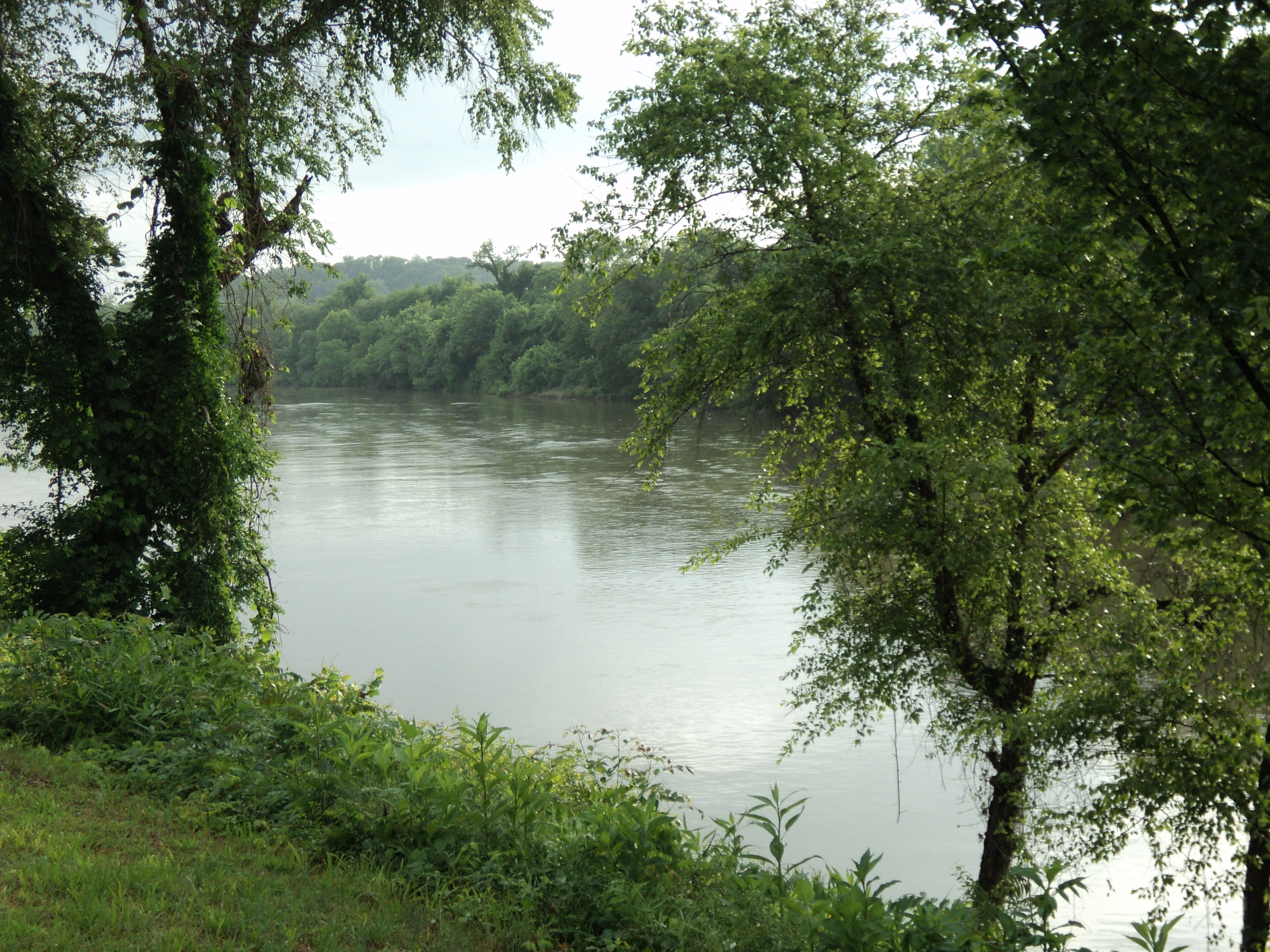
The Dan River in downtown Danville

Numerous Native American tribes had lived in this part of the Piedmont region since prehistoric times. During the colonial period, the area was inhabited by Siouan language-speaking tribes.

In 1728, English colonist William Byrd headed an expedition sent to determine the true boundary between Virginia and North Carolina. Late that summer, the party camped upstream from what is now Danville. Byrd was so taken with the beauty of the land, that he prophesied a future settlement in the vicinity, where people would live "with much comfort and gaiety of Heart." He named the river along which they camped as the "Dan", for Byrd felt he had wandered "From Dan to Beersheba."

After the American Revolutionary War, the first settlement developed in 1792 downstream from Byrd's campsite, at a spot along the river shallow enough to allow fording. It was named "Wynne's Falls", after the first settler. The village developed from the meetings of pioneering Revolutionary War veterans, who gathered annually here to fish and talk over old times.

In 1793, the state General Assembly authorized construction of a tobacco warehouse at Wynne's Falls. This marks the start of the town as "The World's Best Tobacco Market", Virginia's largest market for brightleaf tobacco. The village was renamed "Danville" by an act of November 23, 1793.

=== 19th century ===
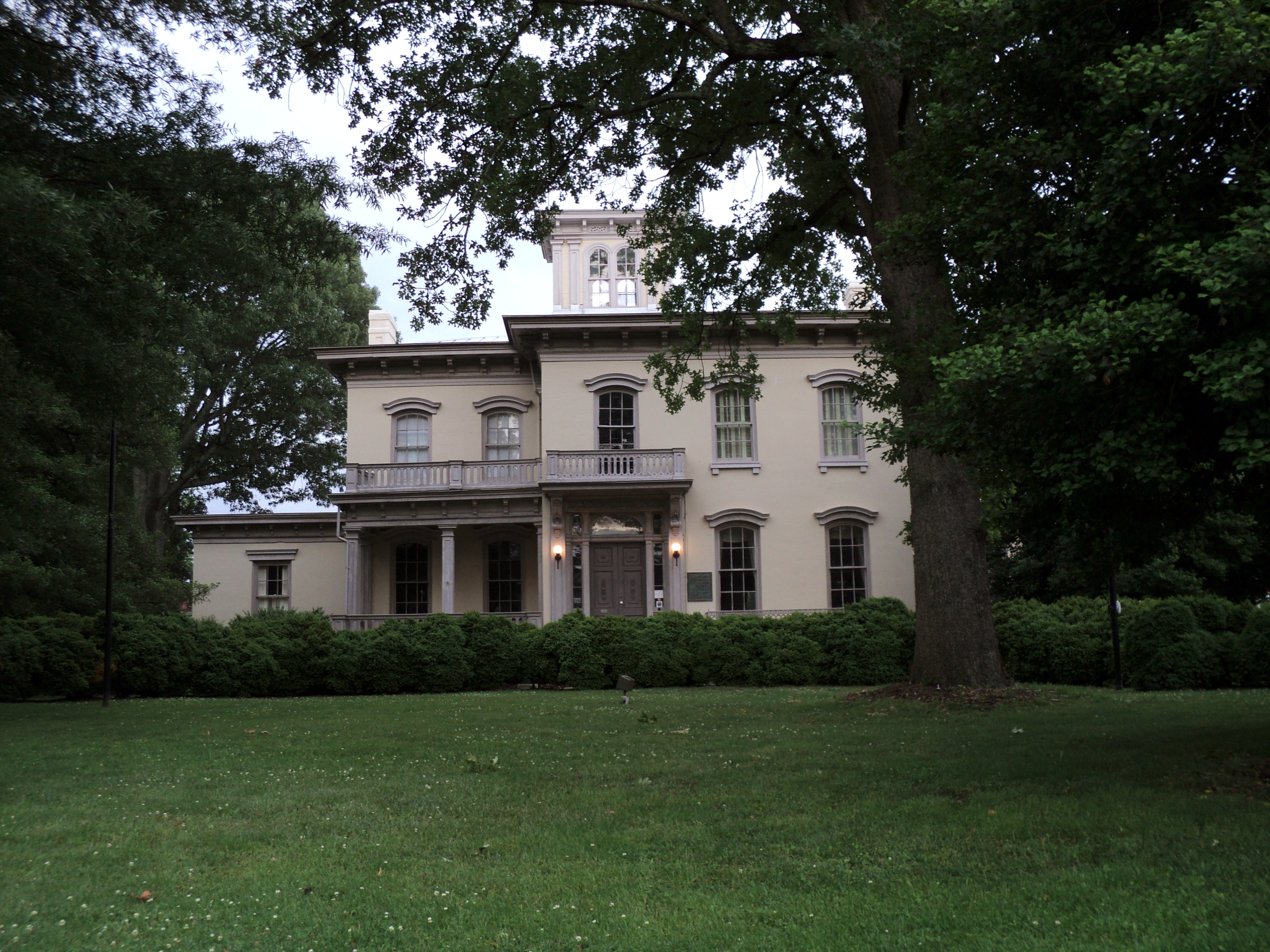
Danville was home to tobacco entrepreneur William T. Sutherlin. The city was sometimes called the "last capitol of the Confederacy"

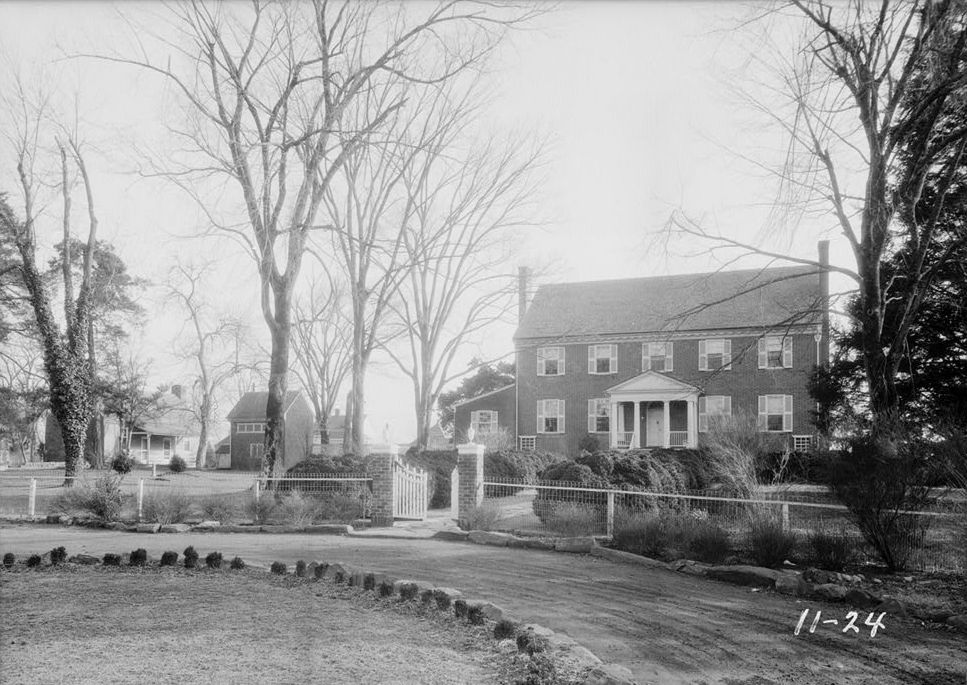
Dan's Hill estate in western Danville

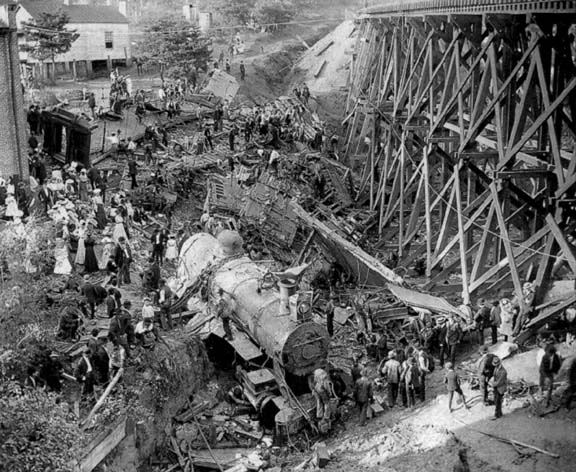
Wreck of the Old 97, 1903

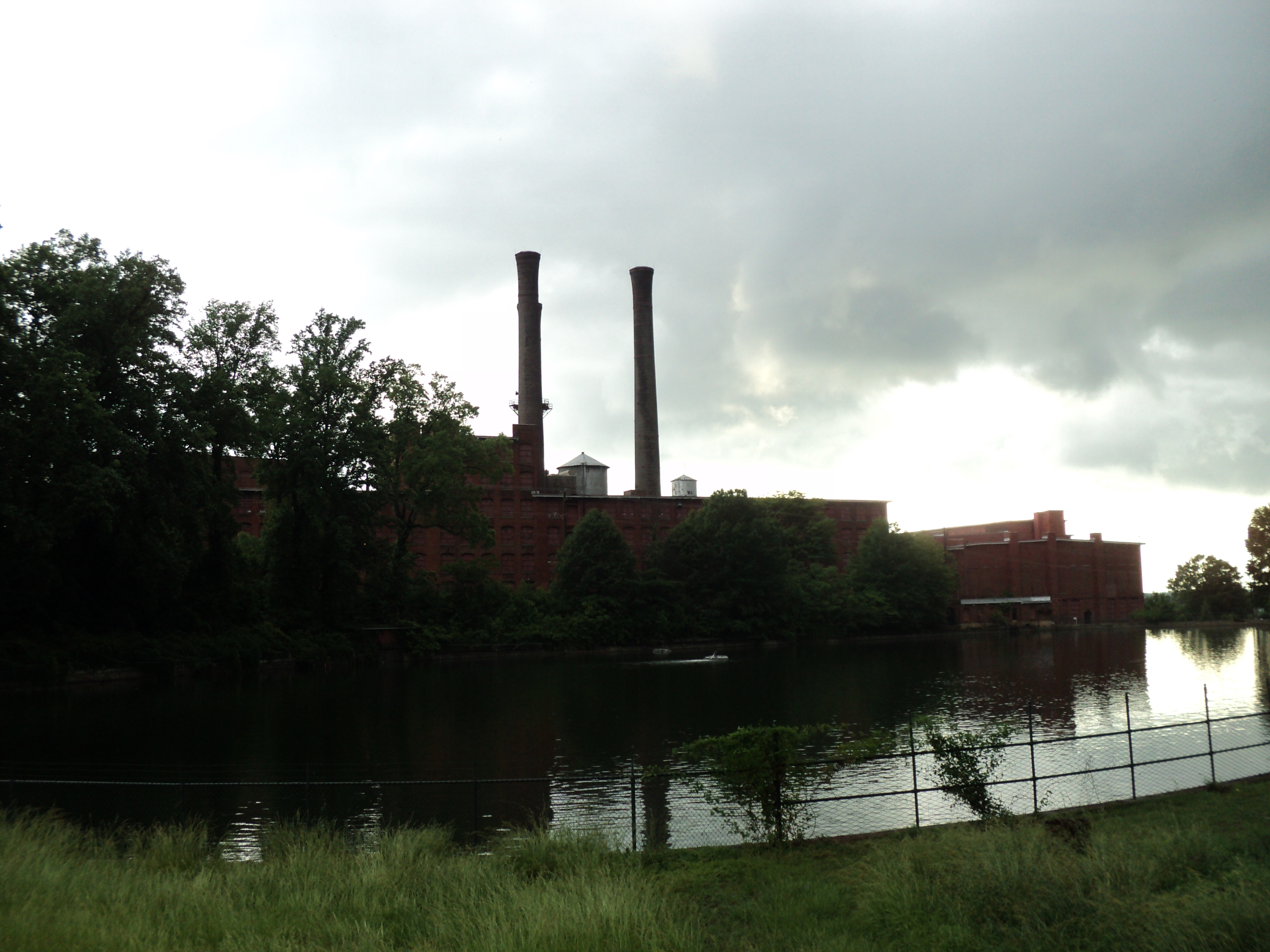
The abandoned Dan River Mills on the Dan River

A charter for the town was drawn up on February 17, 1830, but by the time of its issue, the population had exceeded the pre-arranged boundaries. This necessitated a new charter, which was issued in 1833. In that year, James Lanier was elected the first mayor, assisted by a council of "twelve fit and able men."

By the mid-19th century, William T. Sutherlin, a planter and entrepreneur, was the first to apply water power to run a tobacco press. He became a major industrialist in the region.

In the mid to late 1800s, several railroads reached Danville, including the Richmond and Danville Railroad (completed 1856), and the Atlantic and Danville Railway (completed 1890). These enabled the export of Danville's manufacturing and agricultural products. The major growth in industry came in the late 19th century, after the war. The Southern Railway, successor to the Richmond and Danville, built a grand passenger station in Danville in 1899, which is still in use by Amtrak and is a satellite facility of the Virginia Museum.

At the outbreak of the Civil War, Danville had a population of approximately 5,000 people. During the war years, the town was transformed into a strategic center of Confederate activity. William Sutherlin was named quartermaster of its depot. The rail center was critical for supplying Confederate forces, and a hospital station was established for Confederate wounded. A network of batteries, breastworks, redoubts and rifle pits defended the town.

A prison camp was set up, with the conversion of six tobacco warehouses, including one owned by Sutherlin, for use as prisons. At one time they held more than 5,000 captured Union soldiers. Malnutrition and dysentery, plus a smallpox epidemic in 1864, caused the death of 1,314 of these prisoners. Their remains have been interred in the Danville National Cemetery.

The Richmond and Danville Railroad was the main supply route into Petersburg, where Lee's Army of Northern Virginia was holding the defensive line to protect Richmond. The Danville supply train ran until General Stoneman's Union cavalry troops tore up the tracks. This event was immortalized in the song "The Night They Drove Old Dixie Down."

In 1865, Danville hosted the Confederate government. Confederate President Jefferson Davis stayed at Sutherlin's mansion from April 3 to 10, 1865, and the house became known as the "Last Capitol of the Confederacy." Here he wrote and issued his last Presidential Proclamation. The final Confederate Cabinet meeting was held at the Benedict House (since destroyed) in Danville. Davis and members of his cabinet left the city when they learned of Lee's surrender at Appomattox, and moved to Greensboro, North Carolina, making their way south. On the day they left, Governor William Smith arrived from Lynchburg to establish his headquarters here.

In 1882, the biracial Readjuster Party had gained control of the city council, causing resentment and even alarm among some white residents; even though the council was still dominated by white members, the city had a majority African-American population. The Readjuster Party had been in power at the state level since 1879. Violence broke out on November 3, 1883, a few days before the election, when a racially motivated street fight turned to shooting after a large crowd gathered; five men were killed, four of them black. A local Danville commission found African Americans at fault for the violence on November 3, but a US Senate investigation decided that white residents were to blame. No prosecution resulted from either inquiry.

In the late 19th and continuing into the early 20th centuries, tobacco processing was a major source of wealth for business owners in the city, in addition to the textile mills. Wealthy planters and owners built fine houses, some of which have been preserved.

Given the falls on the river, the area was prime for industrial development based on water power. On July 22, 1882, six of Danville's residents (Thomas Benton Fitzgerald, Dr. H.W. Cole, Benjamin F. Jefferson and three brothers: Robert A., John H., and James E. Schoolfield) founded the Riverside Cotton Mills, making use of cotton produced throughout the South. Both the Riverside Cotton Mills and Danville itself grew tremendously during Fitzgerald's leadership of the company as President. In its day it was known nationally as Dan River Inc., the largest single-unit textile mill in the world.

As the industrial town grew rapidly, it attracted many single workers, and associated gambling, drinking, and prostitution establishments. By the early 20th century, the city passed laws against gambling, but it continued in small, private places. On September 9, 1882, Danville Mayor John H. Johnston shot and killed John E. Hatcher, his chief of police. Hatcher had demanded an apology for a statement Johnston had made regarding unaccounted fine money. Johnston was charged with murder, but he was acquitted at trial. The Southern "culture of honor" was still strong and jurors apparently believed the killing was justified.

The Southern Railway constructed a railroad line to the city in the late 19th century and had facilities here, which contributed to the growing economy. In 1899, the company completed a grand passenger station, designed by its noted architect Frank Pierce Milburn. For many years, passenger traffic was strong on the railroad; it also operated freight trains.

=== 20th century ===
A serious train wreck occurred in Danville on September 27, 1903. "Old 97", the Southern Railway's crack express mail train, was running behind schedule. Its engineer "gave her full throttle", but the speed of the train caused it to jump the tracks while on a high trestle crossing the valley of the Dan River. The engine and five cars plunged into the ravine below, killing nine and injuring seven. The locomotive and its engineer, Joseph A. ("Steve") Broadey, were memorialized in song. A historic marker at the train crash site is located on U.S. 58 between Locust Lane and North Main Street. A mural of the Wreck of the Old 97 has been painted on a downtown Danville building to commemorate the incident.

Afterward Democrats forced African Americans out of office and suppressed their voting rights. In November 1883 Democrats regained control of the state legislature by a large majority, and pushed out the Readjuster Party.

White Democratic legislators interpreted the Danville events as more reason to push blacks out of politics. In 1902, the state legislature passed a new constitution that raised barriers to voter registration, effectively disenfranchising most blacks and many poor whites, who had been part of the Readjuster Party. They excluded them from the political system, causing them to be underrepresented and their segregated facilities to be underfinanced.

On July 15, 1904, the Danville police successfully broke up a lynching party by firing warning shots above a crowd. About 75 white men had gathered at the jail to take Roy Seals, an African American man arrested as a suspect in the murder of a white railroad worker. The police saved Seals and the city quickly indicted some of the lynch mob; several men were convicted, fined and served 30 days in jail. The killer was found to have been another white man, who was prosecuted.

On March 2, 1911, Danville police chief R. E. Morris, who had been elected to three two-year terms and was running for a fourth term, was arrested as an escaped convicted murderer. He admitted that he was really Edgar Stribling of Harris County, Georgia. He had been on the run for thirteen years.

On October 13, 1917, Walter Clark was lynched. He was an African American man who had fatally shot a policeman while resisting arrest for the killing of his common-law wife. Clark held off the police for two hours, but a mob gathered and set his house on fire. He was shot multiple times and killed as he left the house. His was the last lynching in Danville.

Heightened activism in the civil rights movement in Virginia occurred in Danville during the summer of 1963. Since the early 20th century, most blacks had been excluded from voting by the state constitution, which had created barriers to voter registration. White Democrats had imposed legal segregation after regaining control of the state legislature following the Reconstruction era, and Jim Crow laws maintained white supremacy. On May 31, representatives of the black community organized as the Danville Christian Progressive Association (DCPA), demanding an end to segregation and job discrimination in the city. They declared a boycott of white merchants who refused to hire blacks and marched to City Hall in protest of conditions.

Most of the marchers were high school students. Police and city workers, armed with clubs, beat the young protesters and sprayed them with fire hoses. Around forty protesters needed medical attention, but the marches and other protests continued for several weeks. Reverend Martin Luther King Jr., leader of the Southern Christian Leadership Conference (SCLC), came to Danville and spoke at High Street Baptist Church about the police brutality. He said it was the worst he had seen in the South. The date of one protest on June 10, 1963, later came to be referred to as "Bloody Monday."

The Student Nonviolent Coordinating Committee (SNCC) sent organizers to Danville to support the local movement. They helped lead protests, including demonstrations at the Howard Johnson Hotel and restaurant on Lee Highway. The hotel was known for discriminating locally against blacks as customers and excluding them as workers. A special grand jury indicted 13 DCPA, SCLC, and SNCC activists for violating the "John Brown" law. This law, passed in 1830 after a slave uprising, made it a serious felony to "...incite the colored population to acts of violence or war against the white population." It became known as the "John Brown" law in 1860 because it was used to convict and hang abolitionist John Brown after his raid on Harpers Ferry in 1859.

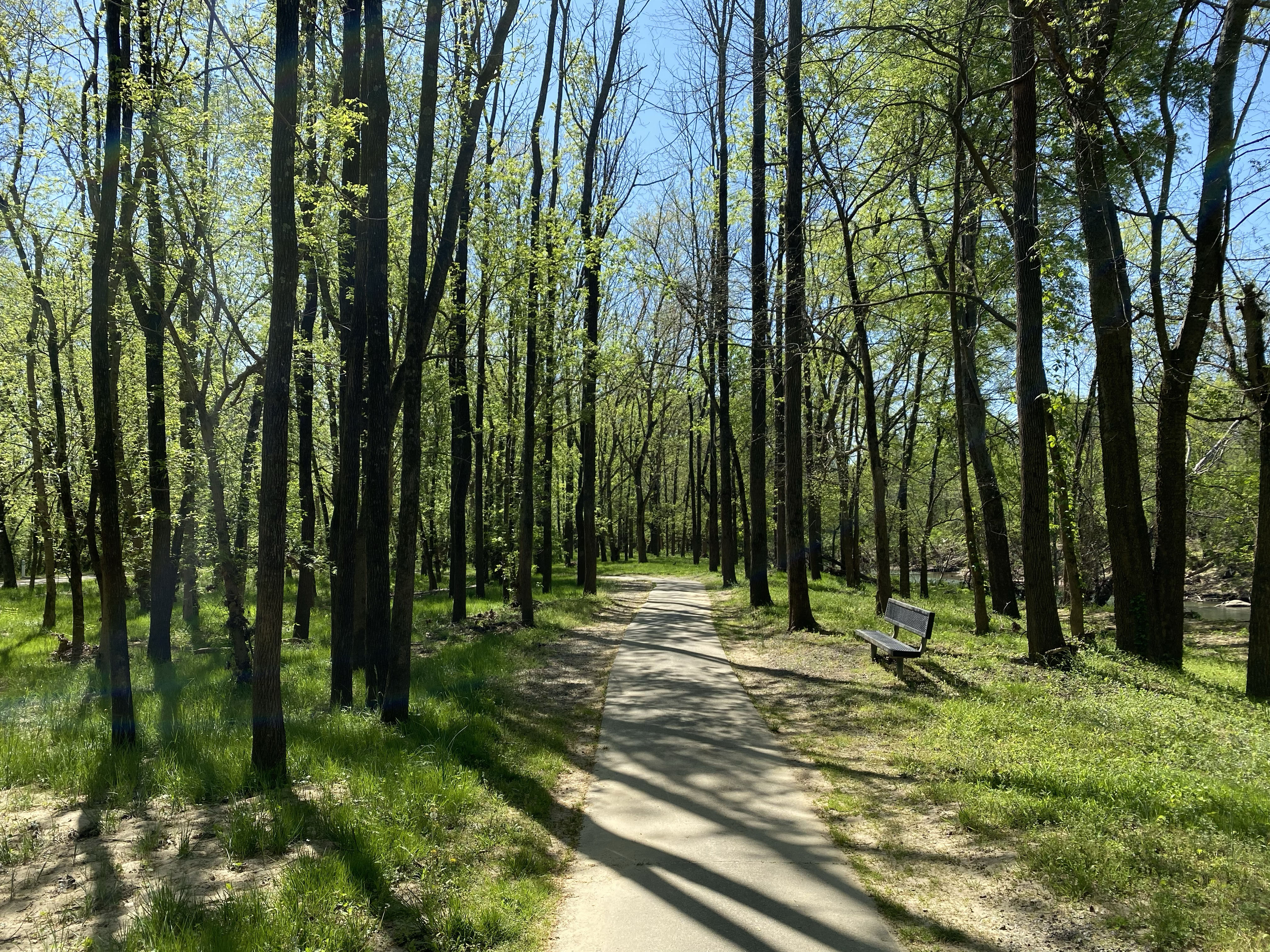
The Riverwalk Trail near the Dan Daniel Park along the Dan River

By the end of August, more than 600 protesters had been arrested in Danville on charges of inciting to violence, contempt, trespassing, disorderly conduct, assault, parading without a permit, and resisting arrest. Because of the large number of arrests on these charges, often the jails were overcrowded, and protesters were housed in detention facilities in other nearby jurisdictions. The demonstrations failed to achieve desegregation in Danville at that time. Town facilities remained segregated until after passage of the Civil Rights Act of 1964. African American residents were mostly unable to register and vote until after the federal government enforced their constitutional rights under the Voting Rights Act of 1965.

Since the late 20th century, the textile industry has moved to offshore, cheaper labor markets. The Dan River mill has closed and many of its buildings have been torn down, with the bricks sold for other uses. "The White Mill" of the Dan Mill complex, considered historically and architecturally significant, is being renovated in the early 21st century as an apartment complex.

In the late 20th century, the restructuring of the tobacco, textile, and railroad industries all had an adverse effect, resulting in the loss of many jobs in Danville. The decline in passenger traffic caused the Danville railroad station to fall into disuse. It was listed on the National Register of Historic Places in 1995, and has been renovated by a combination of public and private funding. Today part of the station is devoted to the first satellite facility of the Science Museum of Virginia.

The station renovations were completed in 1996. This project spurred investment in other warehouse properties, "which have been redeveloped into offices, commercial spaces, apartments, lofts, and restaurants. The approximately $4 million of federal grant money initiated the redevelopment and leveraged additional funds from public and private sources."

Related spaces were developed for a park with amphitheater, a community meeting and recreation facility, and the Danville Farmer's Market. The city used ISTEA funds in association with the Virginia Department of Transportation, and partnered also with Amtrak, Pepsi-Cola, and other private sources.

=== 21st century ===
The city and region continue to work to develop new bases for the economy. At the beginning of the century, in the 2000s, the economic losses made it challenging to preserve the city's many architecturally and historically significant properties dating from its more prosperous years.

In 2007, Preservation Virginia President William B. Kerkam, III, and its Executive Director Elizabeth S. Kostelny announced at a press conference held in Danville at Main Street Methodist Church that the entire city of Danville had been named as one of the Most Endangered Historic Sites in Virginia. This designation highlighted the importance of preserving Danville's architectural and historical heritage and drew attention to the challenges of maintaining these properties amid economic struggles.

Danville has been actively working to redevelop its River District as a hub for community life and economic activity. This effort includes revitalizing historic buildings, fostering local businesses, and promoting heritage tourism to attract visitors and stimulate economic growth.

In 2020, the city approved a referendum to open a casino at the site of the old mill. On December 17, 2024, Caesars Virginia opened to the public. It is expected to generate significant revenue and create jobs for the community.

== Geography ==
Danville is located along the southern border of Virginia, 70 miles (110 km) south of Lynchburg and 45 miles (72 km) northeast of Greensboro, North Carolina, via U.S. Route 29. U.S. Route 58 leads east 78 miles (126 km) to South Hill and west 30 miles (48 km) to Martinsville.

According to the U.S. Census Bureau, the city has a total area of 43.9 square miles (113.7 km^{2}), of which 43.1 square miles (111.6 km^{2}) is land and 1.0 square mile (2.6 km^{2}) (2.3%) is water.

=== Climate ===
Danville has a humid subtropical climate (Köppen Cfa). Winter nights usually average below freezing, with air frosts being abundant during that season. During summer, it is influenced by the strong sun and convective air masses, providing both hot temperatures and frequent thunderstorms.

Climate data for Danville Regional Airport, Virginia (1991–2020 normals, extremes 1916–present)
Month	Jan	Feb	Mar	Apr	May	Jun	Jul	Aug	Sep	Oct	Nov	Dec	Year
Record high °F (°C)	80 (27)	85 (29)	91 (33)	95 (35)	101 (38)	105 (41)	105 (41)	107 (42)	105 (41)	100 (38)	86 (30)	81 (27)	107 (42)
Mean maximum °F (°C)	69.5 (20.8)	72.4 (22.4)	80.8 (27.1)	86.7 (30.4)	90.5 (32.5)	94.9 (34.9)	96.9 (36.1)	95.5 (35.3)	92.0 (33.3)	85.8 (29.9)	76.9 (24.9)	70.6 (21.4)	97.9 (36.6)
Mean daily maximum °F (°C)	48.9 (9.4)	52.7 (11.5)	61.1 (16.2)	71.1 (21.7)	78.0 (25.6)	85.2 (29.6)	88.8 (31.6)	87.2 (30.7)	80.9 (27.2)	71.3 (21.8)	60.7 (15.9)	51.7 (10.9)	69.8 (21.0)
Daily mean °F (°C)	38.5 (3.6)	41.5 (5.3)	49.0 (9.4)	58.1 (14.5)	66.0 (18.9)	73.9 (23.3)	77.9 (25.5)	76.5 (24.7)	70.0 (21.1)	58.8 (14.9)	48.1 (8.9)	41.0 (5.0)	58.3 (14.6)
Mean daily minimum °F (°C)	28.1 (−2.2)	30.2 (−1.0)	36.8 (2.7)	45.0 (7.2)	54.0 (12.2)	62.7 (17.1)	67.0 (19.4)	65.8 (18.8)	59.0 (15.0)	46.2 (7.9)	35.5 (1.9)	30.4 (−0.9)	46.7 (8.2)
Mean minimum °F (°C)	10.9 (−11.7)	16.5 (−8.6)	21.1 (−6.1)	30.1 (−1.1)	39.8 (4.3)	51.5 (10.8)	58.8 (14.9)	57.1 (13.9)	46.4 (8.0)	31.7 (−0.2)	22.2 (−5.4)	17.8 (−7.9)	9.2 (−12.7)
Record low °F (°C)	−5 (−21)	2 (−17)	9 (−13)	20 (−7)	29 (−2)	40 (4)	50 (10)	46 (8)	35 (2)	22 (−6)	11 (−12)	−1 (−18)	−5 (−21)
Average precipitation inches (mm)	3.41 (87)	2.73 (69)	3.53 (90)	3.53 (90)	4.13 (105)	3.98 (101)	4.88 (124)	3.47 (88)	4.25 (108)	3.30 (84)	3.46 (88)	3.06 (78)	43.73 (1,111)
Average snowfall inches (cm)	2.5 (6.4)	2.5 (6.4)	1.5 (3.8)	0.0 (0.0)	0.0 (0.0)	0.0 (0.0)	0.0 (0.0)	0.0 (0.0)	0.0 (0.0)	0.0 (0.0)	0.0 (0.0)	1.1 (2.8)	7.6 (19)
Average precipitation days (≥ 0.01 in)	9.2	9.7	11.1	10.2	12.0	11.0	12.3	11.6	8.8	8.4	8.5	8.8	121.6
Average snowy days (≥ 0.1 in)	2.1	1.2	0.7	0.0	0.0	0.0	0.0	0.0	0.0	0.0	0.0	0.4	3.5
Source: NOAA

Historical population
Census	Pop.	Note	%±
1850	1,514		—
1870	3,463		—
1880	7,426		114.4%
1890	10,305		38.8%
1900	16,520		60.3%
1910	19,020		15.1%
1920	21,539		13.2%
1930	22,247		3.3%
1940	32,749		47.2%
1950	35,066		7.1%
1960	46,577		32.8%
1970	46,391		−0.4%
1980	45,642		−1.6%
1990	53,056		16.2%
2000	48,411		−8.8%
2010	43,055		−11.1%
2020	42,590		−1.1%
2025 (est.)	41,647	▼	−2.2%
U.S. Decennial Census; 1790–1960 1900–1990; 1990–2000 2010–2013<

== Demographics ==
=== Racial and ethnic composition ===
Danville city, Virginia – Racial and ethnic composition Note: the US Census treats Hispanic/Latino as an ethnic category. This table excludes Latinos from the racial categories and assigns them to a separate category. Hispanics/Latinos may be of any race.
Race / Ethnicity (NH = Non-Hispanic)	Pop 1980	Pop 1990	Pop 2000	Pop 2010	Pop 2020	% 1980	% 1990	% 2000	% 2010	% 2020
White alone (NH)	31,694	33,106	25,813	20,107	16,884	69.44%	62.40%	53.32%	46.70%	39.64%
Black or African American alone (NH)	13,444	19,345	21,267	20,725	21,733	29.46%	36.46%	43.93%	48.14%	51.03%
Native American or Alaska Native alone (NH)	37	66	75	66	88	0.08%	0.12%	0.15%	0.15%	0.21%
Asian alone (NH)	132	251	290	394	503	0.29%	0.47%	0.60%	0.92%	1.18%
Native Hawaiian or Pacific Islander alone (NH)	x	x	13	11	1	x	x	0.03%	0.03%	0.00%
Other race alone (NH)	30	12	33	33	143	0.07%	0.02%	0.07%	0.08%	0.34%
Mixed race or Multiracial (NH)	x	x	308	474	1,164	x	x	0.64%	1.10%	2.73%
Hispanic or Latino (any race)	305	276	612	1,245	2,074	0.67%	0.52%	1.26%	2.89%	4.87%
Total	45,642	53,056	48,411	43,055	42,590	100.00%	100.00%	100.00%	100.00%	100.00%

=== 2020 census ===
As of the 2020 census, Danville had a population of 42,590. The median age was 43.0 years. 20.7% of residents were under the age of 18 and 22.4% of residents were 65 years of age or older. For every 100 females there were 84.7 males, and for every 100 females age 18 and over there were 81.0 males age 18 and over.

96.8% of residents lived in urban areas, while 3.2% lived in rural areas.

There were 19,015 households in Danville, of which 25.4% had children under the age of 18 living in them. Of all households, 28.1% were married-couple households, 22.0% were households with a male householder and no spouse or partner present, and 43.9% were households with a female householder and no spouse or partner present. About 39.3% of all households were made up of individuals and 17.3% had someone living alone who was 65 years of age or older.

There were 22,259 housing units, of which 14.6% were vacant. The homeowner vacancy rate was 3.4% and the rental vacancy rate was 10.7%.

Racial composition as of the 2020 census
Race	Number	Percent
White	17,262	40.5%
Black or African American	21,879	51.4%
American Indian and Alaska Native	186	0.4%
Asian	514	1.2%
Native Hawaiian and Other Pacific Islander	1	0.0%
Some other race	1,124	2.6%
Two or more races	1,624	3.8%
Hispanic or Latino (of any race)	2,074	4.9%

=== 2010 census ===
As of the census of 2010, Danville had a population of 43,055. The racial makeup of the city was White Non-Hispanic 46.7%, African American 48.3%, Hispanic 2.9%, Asian 0.9%, Native American or Alaska Native 0.2%, and two or more races 1.3%.

25.4% of the population never married, 46.6% were married, 5.4% were separated. 11.6% were widowed and 11.0% were divorced.

== Economy ==
=== Businesses ===
- Japan Tobacco International
- Caesars Virginia
- Sovah Health – Danville
- Goodyear
- Nestlé
- Swedwood, a subsidiary of IKEA, opened its first factory in the U.S. in this city, in 2008. It employed more than 300 people but closed in December 2019.
- Morgan Olson

== Arts and culture ==
=== River District ===
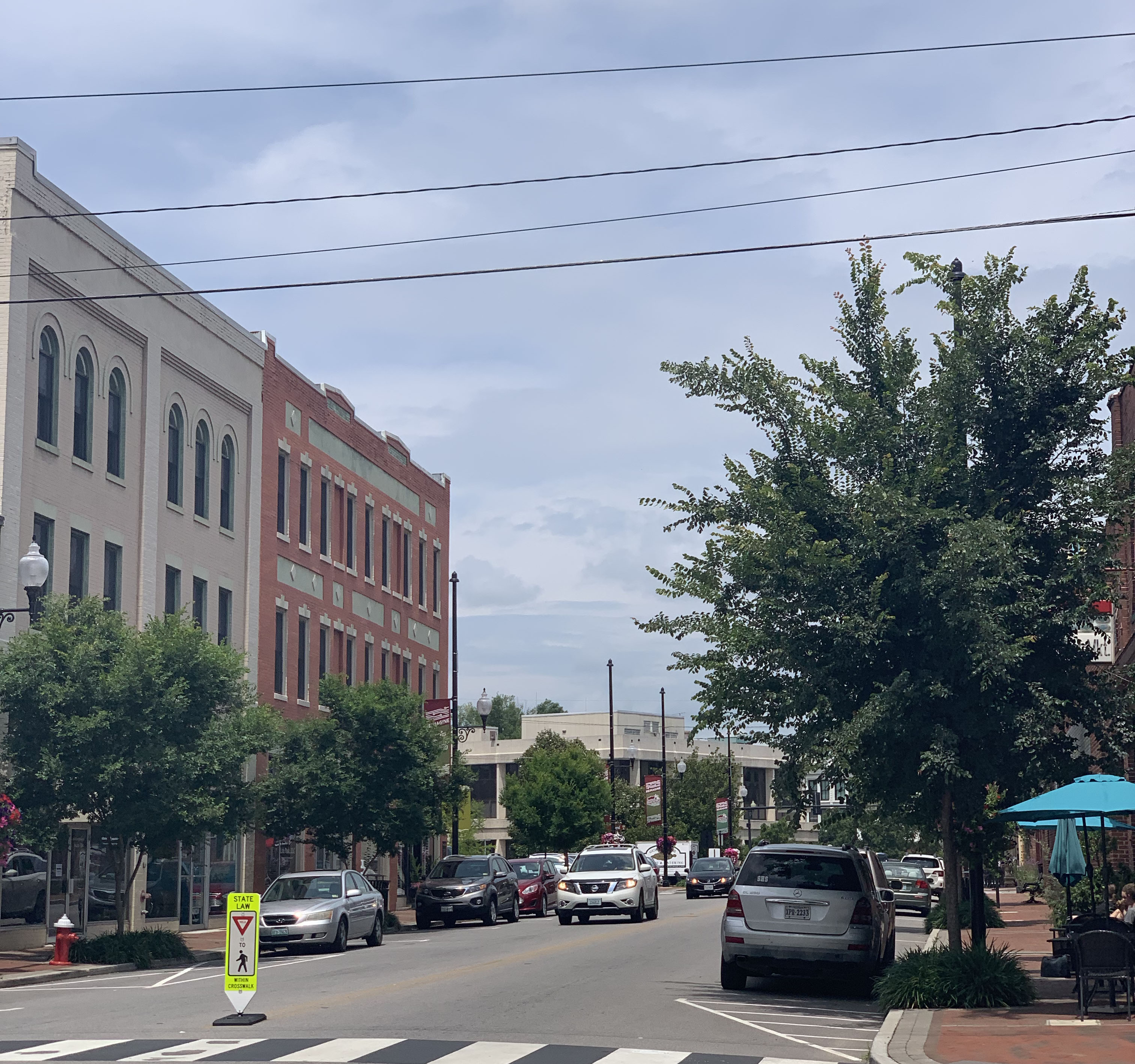
Revitalized Craghead Street in the River District, 2019

Prior to the recession of 2008, the City of Danville and its partners began a major project focused on the revitalization of the Historic Downtown and Tobacco Warehouse districts, now coined "The River District." The project continues with a new momentum as the public sector has joined the movement. See Danville River District.

=== Garland Street and historic districts ===
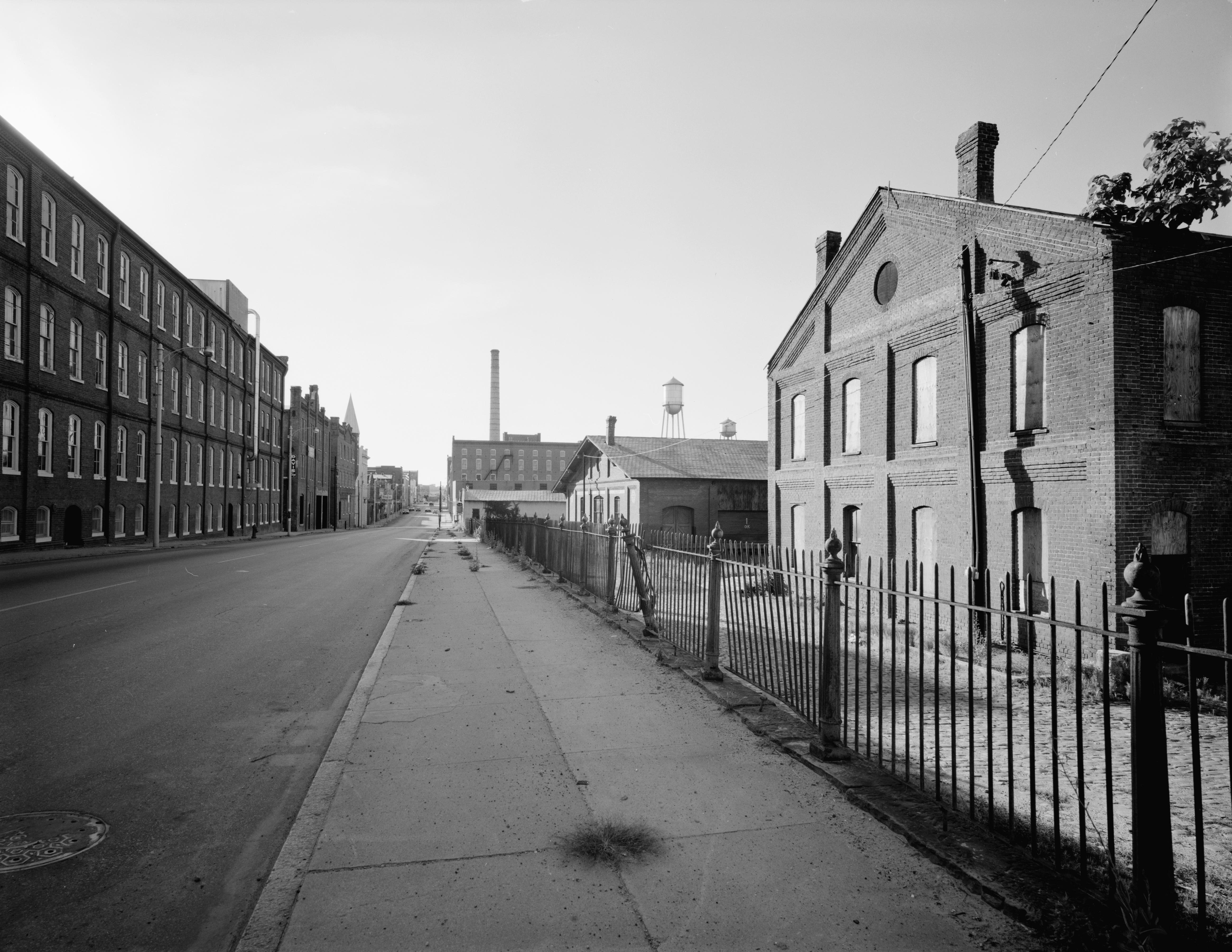
Tobacco Warehouse Historic District

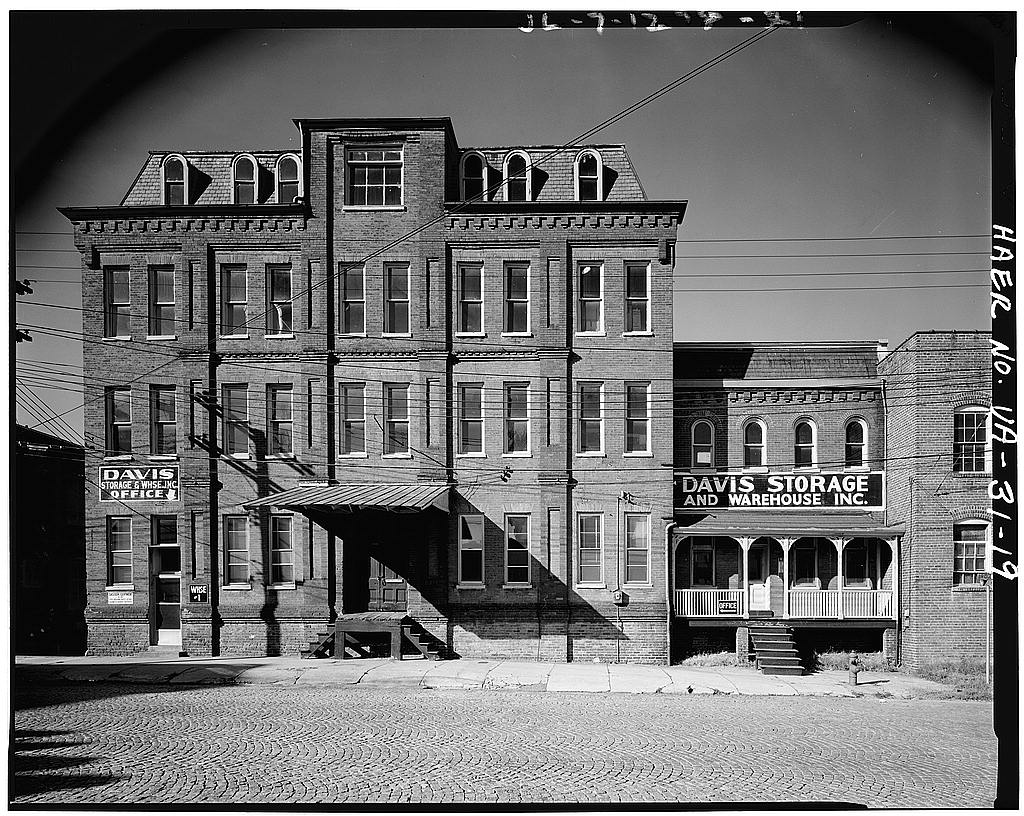
Pemberton & Penn Tobacco Co. building, built 1885–1890, Tobacco Warehouse Historic District

Millionaire's Row has many homes built in the late 19th and early 20th centuries by successful tobacco planters, who gained their wealth in this commodity crop. The mansions are in an area of many street trees and often have their own well-developed landscaping.

The entire area of Penn's Bottom, the nickname for the part of Main Street that was developed as the first suburb of Danville during the tobacco boom of the late 19th century, has been designated as a historic district. Other recognized historic districts include The Old West End, Tobacco Warehouse, Downtown Danville, Holbrook–Ross Street, and North Main.

Also located in this district is the "Sutherlin Mansion", now used as the Danville Museum of Fine Arts and History. This Italianate mansion was the plantation home of Major William T. Sutherlin, a major tobacco processing industrialist, banker, politician, and Confederate quartermaster.

In April 1865, Sutherlin offered his mansion to President Jefferson Davis and his cabinet as the site of the last "Capitol of the Confederacy" after the fall of Richmond. The museum and its grounds occupy a block in this district. In the late 19th century, Sutherlin's surrounding plantation was subdivided and developed to create the surrounding residential neighborhood.

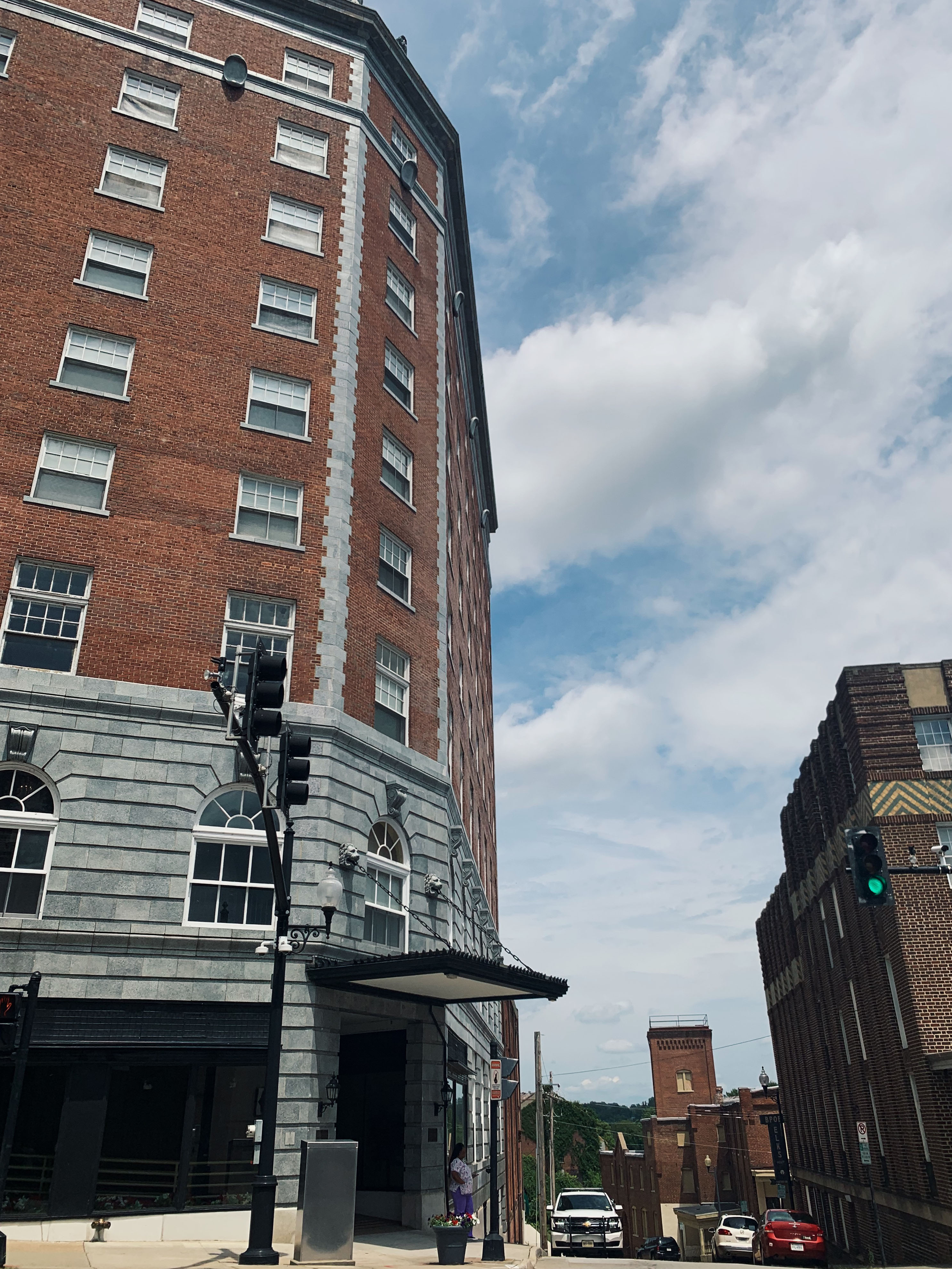
Old Danville Hotel that now works as a nursing facility for the elderly

=== Churches ===
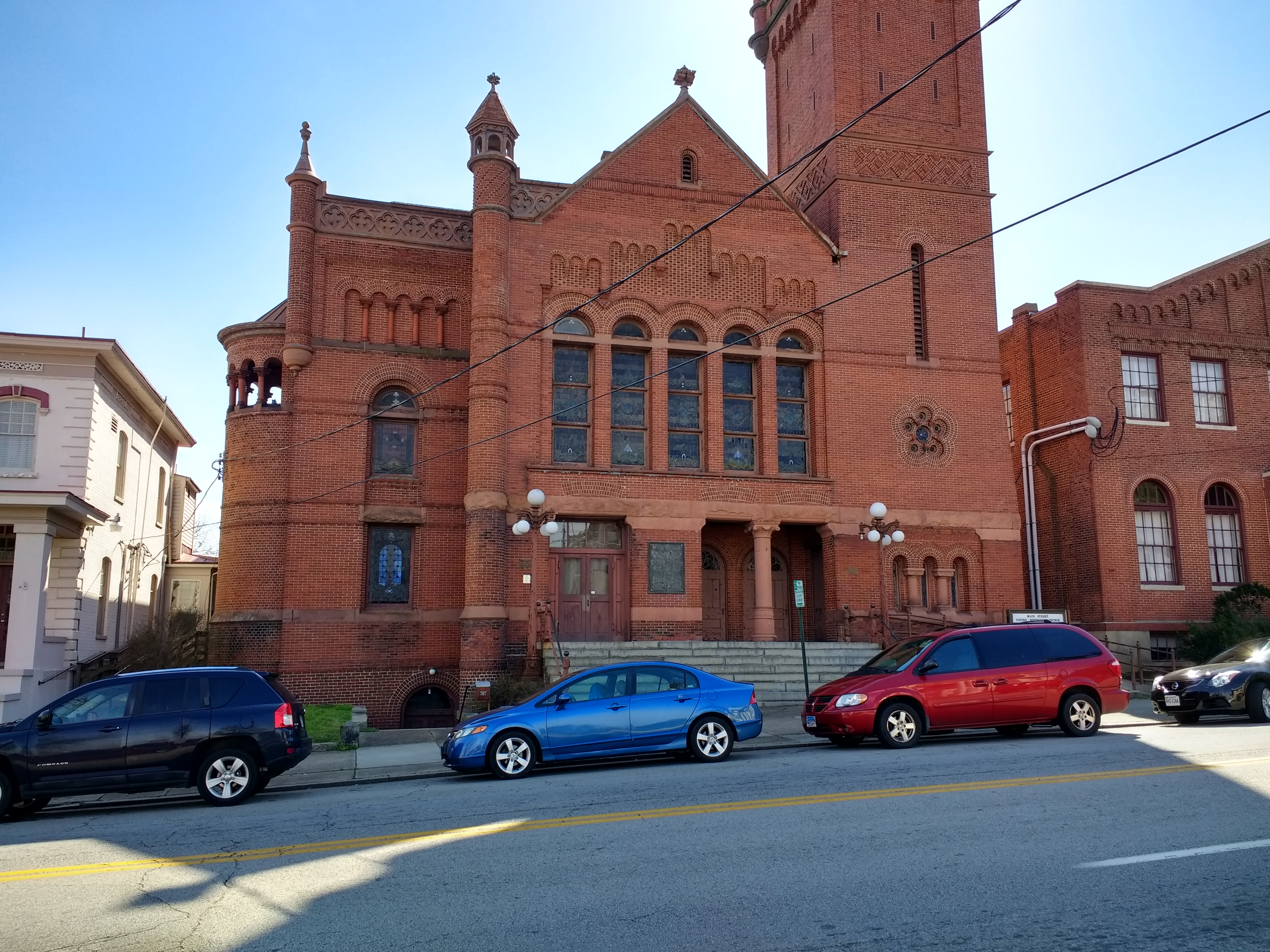
Main Street United Methodist Church

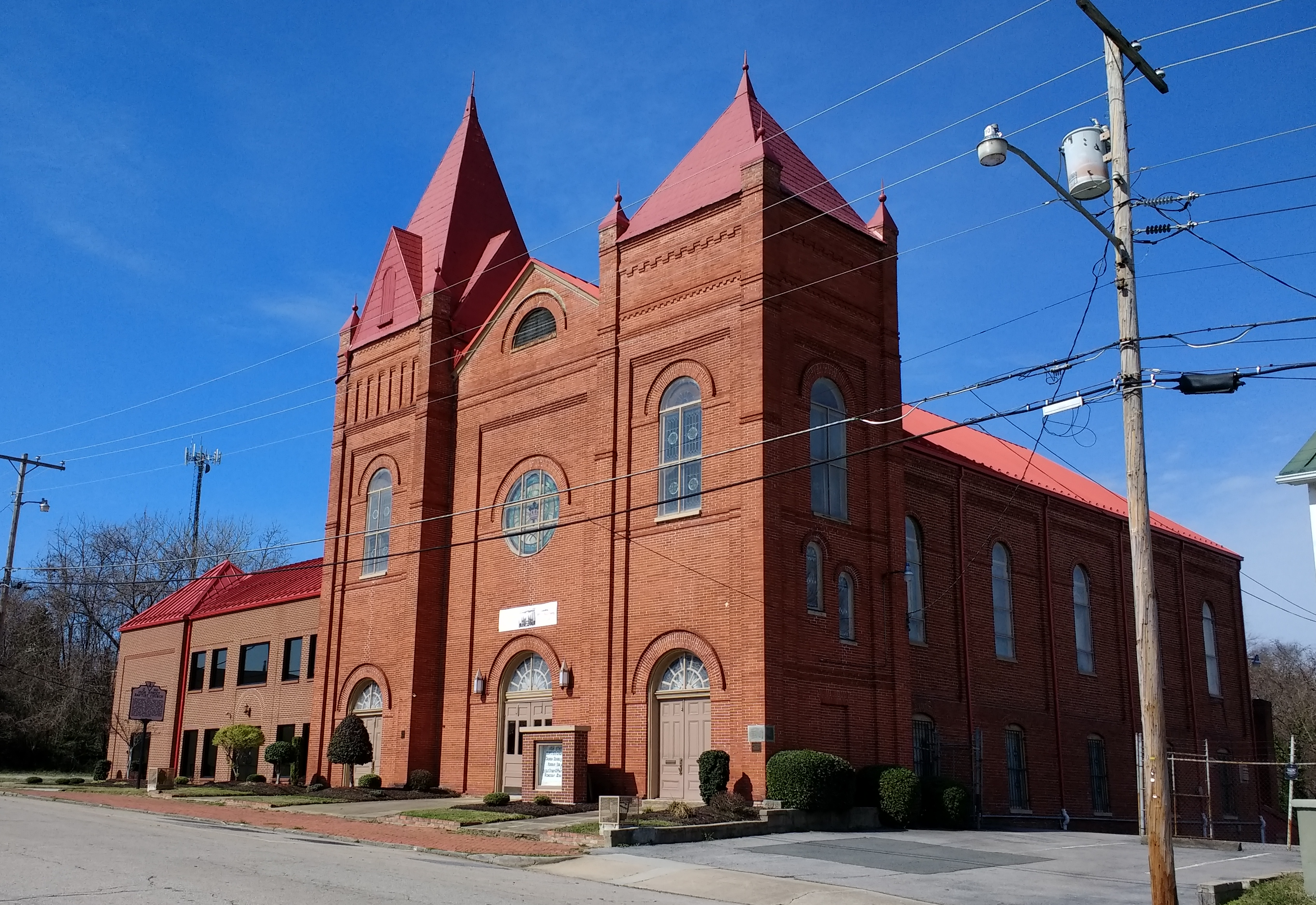
High Street Baptist Church in the Mechanicsville Historic District

Danville is known as "the city of churches" because it has more churches per square mile than any other city in the Commonwealth of Virginia.

=== Shopping ===
Danville Mall, formerly Piedmont Mall, opened in 1984.

== Government ==
From 1948 until 2004, Danville was a consistent Republican stronghold in presidential elections. However, John Kerry won the city by 37 votes in 2004, and since then it has swung heavily into the Democratic column by margins of usually over 20 percentage points.

United States presidential election results for Danville, Virginia
Year	Republican		Democratic		Third party(ies)	
Year	No.	%	No.	%	No.	%
1880	575	43.43%	749	56.57%	0	0.00%
1884	888	47.11%	997	52.89%	0	0.00%
1888	812	43.08%	1,070	56.76%	3	0.16%
1892	710	36.30%	1,234	63.09%	12	0.61%
1896	1,078	37.53%	1,702	59.26%	92	3.20%
1900	310	15.71%	1,575	79.83%	88	4.46%
1904	101	10.32%	836	85.39%	42	4.29%
1908	206	17.33%	963	80.99%	20	1.68%
1912	93	7.38%	1,066	84.60%	101	8.02%
1916	229	15.32%	1,151	76.99%	115	7.69%
1920	551	22.25%	1,888	76.25%	37	1.49%
1924	473	21.11%	1,577	70.37%	191	8.52%
1928	2,360	66.37%	1,196	33.63%	0	0.00%
1932	740	23.99%	2,264	73.41%	80	2.59%
1936	549	14.28%	3,266	84.94%	30	0.78%
1940	787	19.01%	3,324	80.27%	30	0.72%
1944	1,231	28.20%	3,121	71.48%	14	0.32%
1948	1,579	28.98%	2,334	42.84%	1,535	28.18%
1952	4,765	58.49%	3,323	40.79%	58	0.71%
1956	4,561	59.03%	2,409	31.18%	756	9.79%
1960	4,966	63.72%	2,611	33.50%	217	2.78%
1964	7,900	62.09%	4,539	35.67%	285	2.24%
1968	6,796	40.27%	4,495	26.64%	5,583	33.09%
1972	12,463	73.68%	4,148	24.52%	305	1.80%
1976	10,235	59.46%	6,425	37.33%	552	3.21%
1980	10,665	61.43%	6,138	35.35%	559	3.22%
1984	12,141	66.85%	5,846	32.19%	174	0.96%
1988	12,221	61.49%	7,353	37.00%	300	1.51%
1992	9,584	48.75%	8,134	41.37%	1,943	9.88%
1996	9,254	49.97%	8,168	44.11%	1,097	5.92%
2000	9,427	51.49%	8,221	44.91%	659	3.60%
2004	9,399	49.18%	9,436	49.37%	277	1.45%
2008	8,361	40.02%	12,352	59.13%	177	0.85%
2012	7,763	38.42%	12,218	60.47%	223	1.10%
2016	7,303	38.53%	11,059	58.35%	590	3.11%
2020	7,428	38.31%	11,710	60.40%	251	1.29%
2024	6,894	38.92%	10,615	59.93%	203	1.15%

=== Municipal ===
Danville has a council–manager government in which a city manager is hired by council to supervise the city government and ensure that the ordinances and policies made by the city council are carried out in an effective manner.

The city council consists of nine members elected from single-member districts representing residents. The city council selects the mayor and vice mayor from among its members to serve two-year terms.

The city council has the power "to adopt and enforce legislative and budgetary ordinances, policies, and rules and regulations necessary to conduct the public's business and to provide for the protection of the general health, safety and welfare of the public."

==== 2025 attack ====
In 2025, City Councilman Lee Vogler was set on fire by a man who knew Vogler personally and alleged that his wife had cheated with Vogler. After the attack, Vogler was airlifted to the burn unit at UNC-Chapel Hill. The man was diagnosed with multiple conditions that led to a disassociative episode during his time at Central State Hospital, where he spent two weeks in custody after the attack. The man was convicted of aggravated malicious wounding, for which the man received a life sentence suspended to 35 years, and attempted first-degree murder, for which the man received a 10-year sentence suspended to 5 years.

== Sports ==
The Danville Braves were a minor league baseball team in Danville from 1993 to 2020. They competed in the Appalachian League as a farm team of the Atlanta Braves. The Braves played their home games at American Legion Field.

In conjunction with a contraction of Minor League Baseball beginning with the 2021 season, the Appalachian League was reorganized as a collegiate summer baseball league, and the Braves were replaced by the Danville Otterbots in the revamped league designed for rising college freshmen and sophomores.

== Education ==
=== Elementary and high schools ===
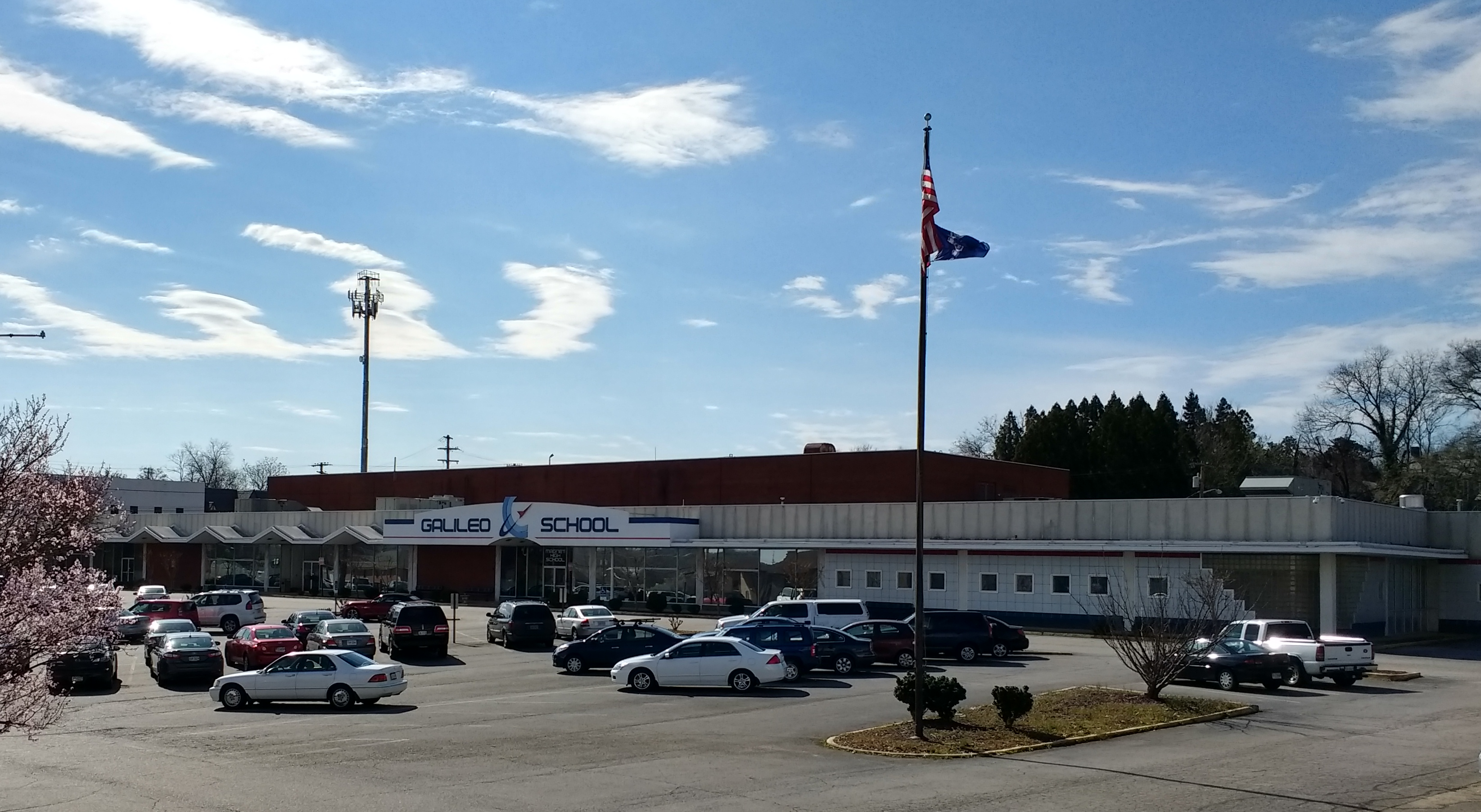
Galileo Magnet High School

- Galileo Magnet High School
- George Washington High School
- Piedmont Governor's School for Mathematics, Science, and Technology
- O.T. Bonner Middle School
- Westwood Middle School
- E.A. Gibson Elementary School
- Forest Hills Elementary School
- G.L.H. Johnson Elementary School
- Park Avenue Elementary School
- Schoolfield Elementary School
- Woodberry Hills Elementary School

=== Private schools ===
- Westover Christian Academy
- Sacred Heart Catholic School
- Legacy Christian Academy
- Rivermont School Danville

=== Colleges and universities ===
- Averett University
- Danville Community College
- Danville Regional Medical Center School of Health Professions
- Stratford College, 1930–1974

== Media ==
=== Newspapers ===
- Chatham Star Tribune
- Danville Register & Bee

=== Magazines ===
- Evince
- Showcase Magazine

=== Radio ===
- WAKG (103.3 FM)
- WBTM (102.5 FM)
- WDVA (1250 AM)
- WMPW (105.9 FM), branded as MoreFM
- WWDN (104.5 FM)

=== Television ===
Danville is served by television stations in the Roanoke/Lynchburg television market.

- WSET-TV, ABC, affiliate based in Lynchburg
- WSLS-TV, NBC, affiliate based in Roanoke
- WDBJ, CBS, affiliate based in Roanoke
- WFXR, Fox, affiliate based in Roanoke
- WWCW, CW affiliate based in Lynchburg
- WPXR-TV, ION, affiliate based in Roanoke
- WMDV-LD, an independent television station owned by the Martinsville, VA-based Star News Corporation

Danville was once the home of WDRL-TV 24, a station that was an affiliate of the WB and United Paramount Network before changing ownership from 2007 to 2014. Today, it is known as WZBJ, a sister channel of WDBJ and is owned by Gray Television.

== Infrastructure ==
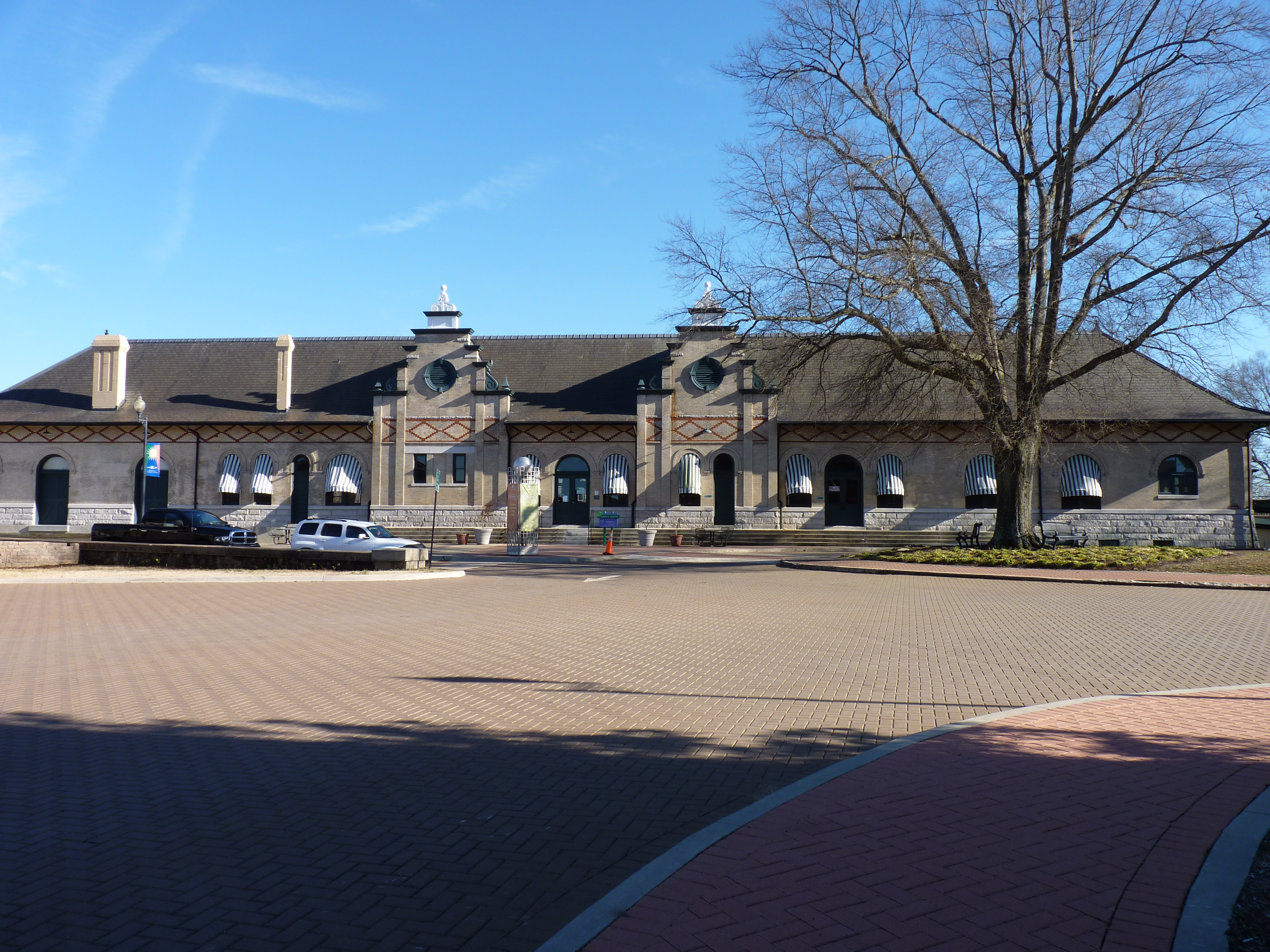
Danville Amtrak station, built in 1899

=== Transportation ===
==== Railroad ====
Amtrak's Crescent train connects Danville with the cities of New York, Philadelphia, Baltimore, Washington, Charlotte, Atlanta, Birmingham and New Orleans. The Danville station, built in 1899 by Southern Railways, is situated at 677 Craghead Street.

==== Highways ====
U.S. Route 58 (Riverside Dr/River St) parallels the north bank of the Dan River traveling east–west through Danville's main commercial district while the US 58 Bypass route bypasses the city's center to the south via the Danville Expressway.

U.S. Route 29 splits into a business route and a bypass at the North Carolina/Virginia border. The business route enters the heart of Danville via West Main Street and Memorial Drive and exits via Central Boulevard and Piney Forest Road; US 29 Business travels relatively north–south. The bypass (future Interstate 785) takes the eastern segment of the Danville Expressway and rejoins the business route north of the city near Chatham, Virginia.

U.S. Route 360, which connects Danville with Richmond, enters the city from the east concurrent with U.S. Route 58 (South Boston Road), continuing along U.S. Route 58 Business at the Danville Expressway interchange, and terminating at the North Main Street intersection just north of downtown.

U.S. Route 311 in 2013 was expanded from North Carolina to terminate just outside Danville's western limits at U.S. Route 58.

North Carolina Highway 86 becomes State Route 86 once it crosses the state line into Danville as South Main Street. It continues north to its terminus at US 29 Business/Central Boulevard.

State Route 293 was created in 1998 to mark the route of old US 29 Business, which was rerouted to the west. SR 293 enters Danville's downtown historic district as West Main Street, then Main Street, and then crosses the Dan River to meet US 29 Business as North Main Street.

State Route 51 parallels US 58 Business as Westover Drive from its western terminus at US 58 Business at the Danville's corporate limits to its eastern terminus at US 58 Business near the Dan River.

==== Airport ====
The city is also served by Danville Regional Airport.

== Notable people ==
- Nancy Astor, Viscountess Astor (born Nancy Langhorne), elected as member, British House of Commons
- Winford W. Barrow, Rear Admiral, U.S. Coast Guard
- Barry Beggarly, Short track race car driver
- William Lewis Cabell, Confederate brigadier general and mayor of Dallas
- Buddy Curry, Atlanta Falcons player
- Jon Dalton, reality television personality (also known as Johnny Fairplay)
- Wendy Dascomb, Miss Virginia USA 1969 and Miss USA 1969
- Terry Davis, former NBA professional basketball player
- Frederick Delius, classical music composer, 1885–1886
- Ferrell Edmunds, NFL player
- Robert H. Edmunds Jr., North Carolina Supreme Court justice
- Tremaine Edmunds, NFL player
- Blind Boy Fuller, blues guitarist and vocalist, street performer in Danville
- Lee E. Goodman, former Chairman, U.S. Federal Election Commission
- Emmet Gowin, photographer
- J. Hartwell Harrison, M.D., instrumental in the world's first kidney transplant
- Richard Benjamin Harrison, star of the reality television series Pawn Stars.
- John B. Henderson, U.S. Senator from Missouri
- Jules James, Vice Admiral, U.S. Navy, during World War II; awarded the French Legion of Honour
- Richard Jewell (born Richard White; 1962–2007), police officer and security guard who became a hero in connection with the Centennial Olympic Park bombing at the 1996 Summer Olympics in Atlanta, Georgia
- George M. La Monte, paper manufacturer, politician, philanthropist
- Teresa Lewis, a murderer who was the first woman executed by lethal injection in Virginia
- Margaret Livingstone, neurobiologist and professor at Harvard Medical School
- Henry Lumpkin Wilson, physician in Atlanta who served as Confederate army chief physician, later known as real estate developer and investor, local politician, drug retailer
- Ralph Lowenstein, journalism professor and dean of the University of Florida College of Journalism and Communications
- Percy Miller Jr., first black baseball player in the Carolina League
- Jim Mitchell, NFL player (defensive end, Detroit Lions 1970–1977), Virginia State University football player
- Herman Moore, NFL player, University of Virginia football player
- Johnny Newman, NBA player
- Mojo Nixon, psychobilly musician and Sirius Satellite Radio host
- Eric Owens, former Major League Baseball player
- John Wardlaw Paxton, D.D., missionary to China and family namesake of Paxton Street in Danville
- Timothy Peters, NASCAR racecar driver
- Nate Poole, NFL player
- Tony Rice, bluegrass musician
- James I. Robertson Jr., historian, professor of history at Virginia Tech
- Gregory L. Robinson, director of the James Webb Space Telescope
- Wendell Scott, first African-American NASCAR driver
- Peyton Sellers, NASCAR driver
- Clarence Edward Smith, better known by his assumed names Clarence 13X and Allah, The Nation of Gods and Earths founder
- Charles Stanley, former president of Southern Baptist Convention, senior pastor of First Baptist Church Atlanta, and founder and president of In Touch Ministries
- Donald Smith, NFL Player
- Skipp Sudduth, actor (Ronin and Third Watch)
- William T. Sutherlin, planter, industrialist and politician; the first to apply steam power to tobacco hydraulics press, founder and president of Bank of Danville, hosted President Jefferson Davis and his cabinet for last week of the Confederacy government
- Don Testerman, professional football player
- Charles Tyner, actor (Sweet Bird of Youth (play) and Cool Hand Luke)
- Ricky Van Shelton, country music singer
- Camilla Ella Williams, opera singer, first African American contracted to sing with New York City Opera
- Andra Willis, singer on The Lawrence Welk Show
- David Wilson, football player for the New York Giants
- Robert E. Withers, former Lieutenant Governor and U.S. Senator
- Tony Womack, Major League Baseball player

== In popular culture ==
Virgil Caine is the name and I served on the Danville train, 'till Stoneman's cavalry came and tore up the tracks again. In the winter of '65, we were hungry, just barely alive...

- Robbie Robertson, The Night They Drove Old Dixie Down

"It's a mighty rough road from Lynchburg to Danville" are lyrics in "Wreck of the Old 97" a song memorializing the September 27, 1903, event that became arguably the most famous train wreck in U.S. history.

The Richmond and Danville Railroad, referenced as "the Danville train", is also mentioned in the popular folk-style song "The Night They Drove Old Dixie Down."

== See also ==
- Fred Siegel The roots of southern distinctiveness : tobacco and society in Danville, Virginia, 1780–1865.
- National Register of Historic Places listings in Danville, Virginia
