= Galileo Magnet High School =

Coordinates: 36°35′5.6″N 79°23′36.4″W

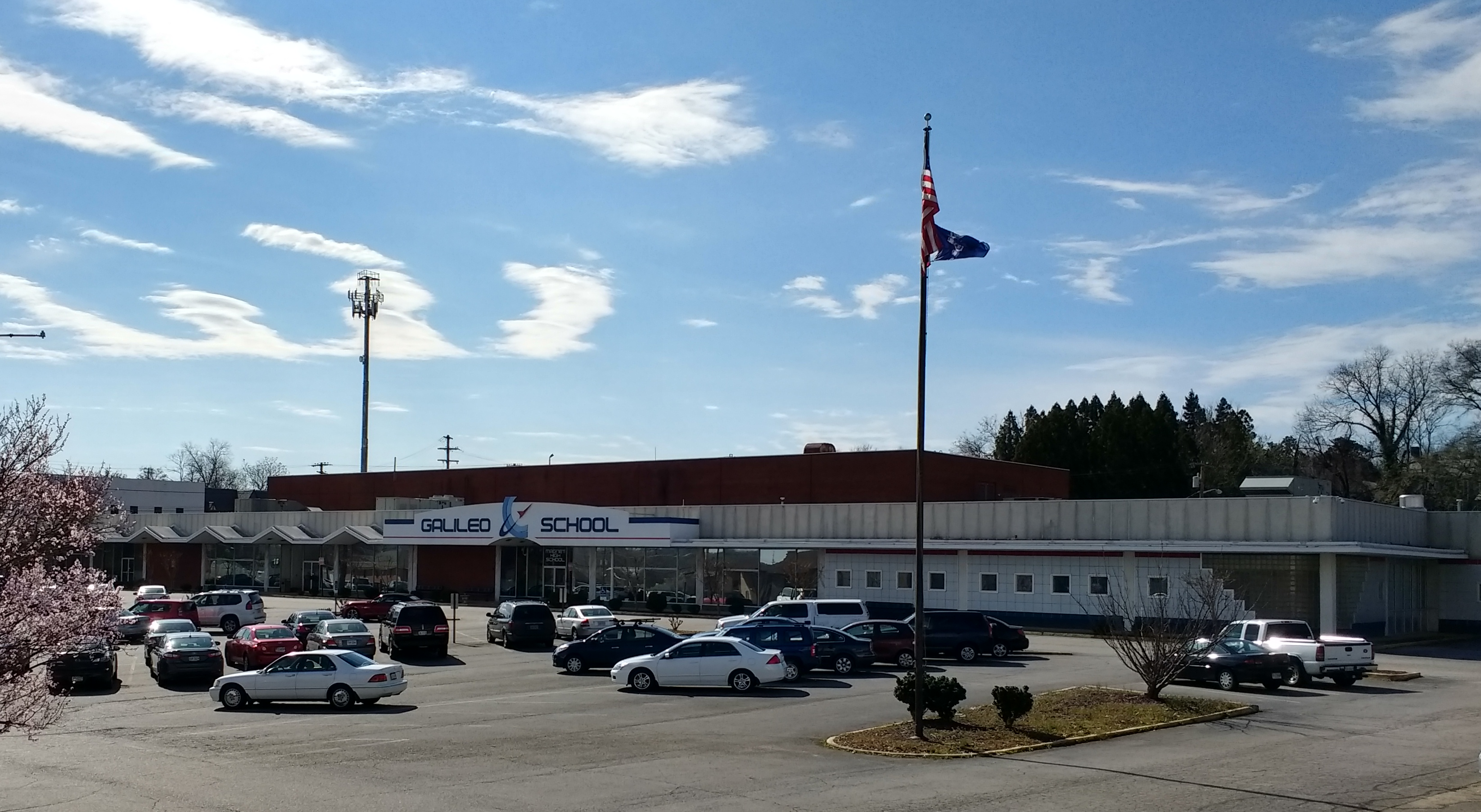

Location
- 228 Cleveland St; Danville, Virginia 24541; United States

Information
- School type: Public, high school
- Founded: 2002
- School district: Danville Public Schools
- Principal: Angela Ramsey
- Grades: 9-12
- Enrollment: 286 (2016–17)
- Language: English
- Campus: Urban
- Colors: Red, Blue, Gray
- Athletics: Soccer, Cross-Country
- Mascot: Falcon
- Newspaper: The Falcon's View
- Feeder schools: O.T. Bonner Middle School, Westwood Middle School
- Website: Galileo Magnet High School Website

Galileo Magnet High School, opened in September 2002, is a public high school located in Danville, Virginia. The school was originally funded by an 8 million dollar grant to the Danville Public School System. By working directly with organizations such as the Langley Research Center and Virginia Tech, Galileo offers a technology-based curriculum, with three strands of study for students to choose from. A thematic-based curriculum is provided in Advanced Communications and Networking Technology, Air and Space Technology, and Biotechnology. U.S. News & World Report ranked the school the 45th best in the state in 2020.

Galileo is an International Baccalaureate world school.

== Athletics ==
Galileo features seven offerings from the VHSL including varsity soccer, cross country, scholastic bowl, indoor, outdoor track, swim and dive, and theatre in the Dogwood District. Galileo has won three overall team state championships in VHSL Class 1 with scholastic bowl in 2018, boys cross country in 2021, and girls cross country in 2023. In addition, Galileo athletes in track have won eight relays and thirteen individual events at the state championships along with an individual state championship in girls cross country.
