= North Danville Historic District =

Historic district in Virginia, United States

- U.S. National Register of Historic Places
- U.S. Historic district
- Virginia Landmarks Register
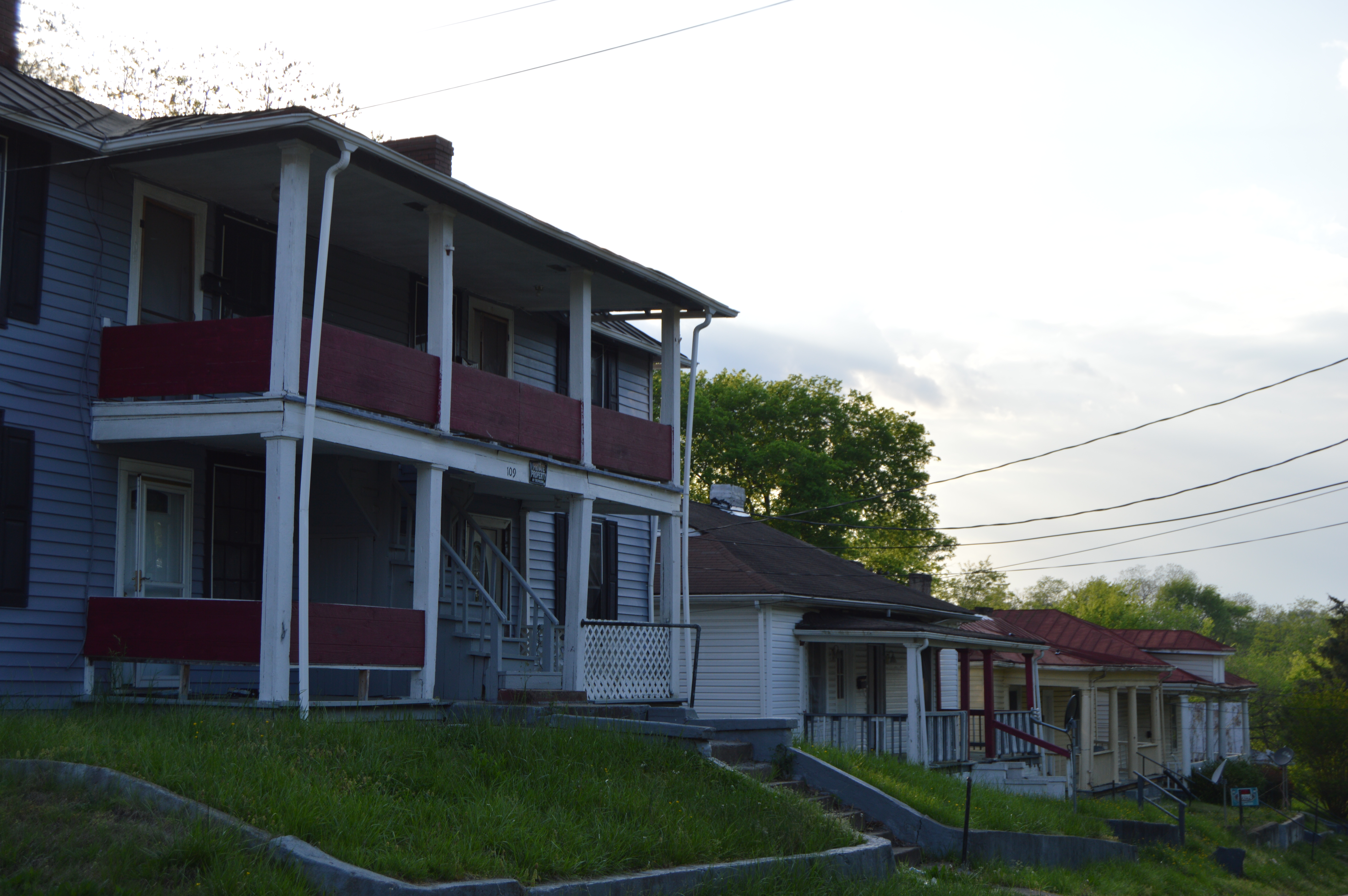
- Houses on Walker Street

- Location within Virginia Location within the United States
- Location: Roughly bounded by N. Main, Worsham, Claiborne, Keister, and W. James Sts. in Danville, Virginia
- Coordinates: 36°35′51″N 79°23′05″W
- Area: 142.8 acres (57.8 ha)
- Architectural style: Late Victorian, Late 19th And 20th Century Revivals
- NRHP reference No.: 03001432
- VLR No.: 108-0113

Significant dates
- Added to NRHP: January 15, 2004
- Designated VLR: January 15, 2004

North Danville Historic District is a national historic district located in Danville, Virginia. The district includes 426 contributing buildings in a primarily residential area of Danville. The district includes three blocks of primarily two-story, brick commercial buildings. Buildings within the district were constructed from around 1880 until roughly 1955 and reflect a wide variety of architectural styles, including vernacular Victorian, Italianate, Queen Anne, Colonial Revival, Tudor Revival, and bungalow designs. Many of these buildings were built by Dan River Cotton Mills founder T.B. Fitzgerald. Notable buildings include the Calvary United Methodist Church (1886), Shelton Memorial Presbyterian Church (1889), Bellevue Public School (1898), Washington Street Methodist Episcopal Church (1910), Keen Street Baptist Church (1927), and Woodrow Wilson High School (1926).

It was listed on the National Register of Historic Places in 2004.

North Danville Contributing Buildings

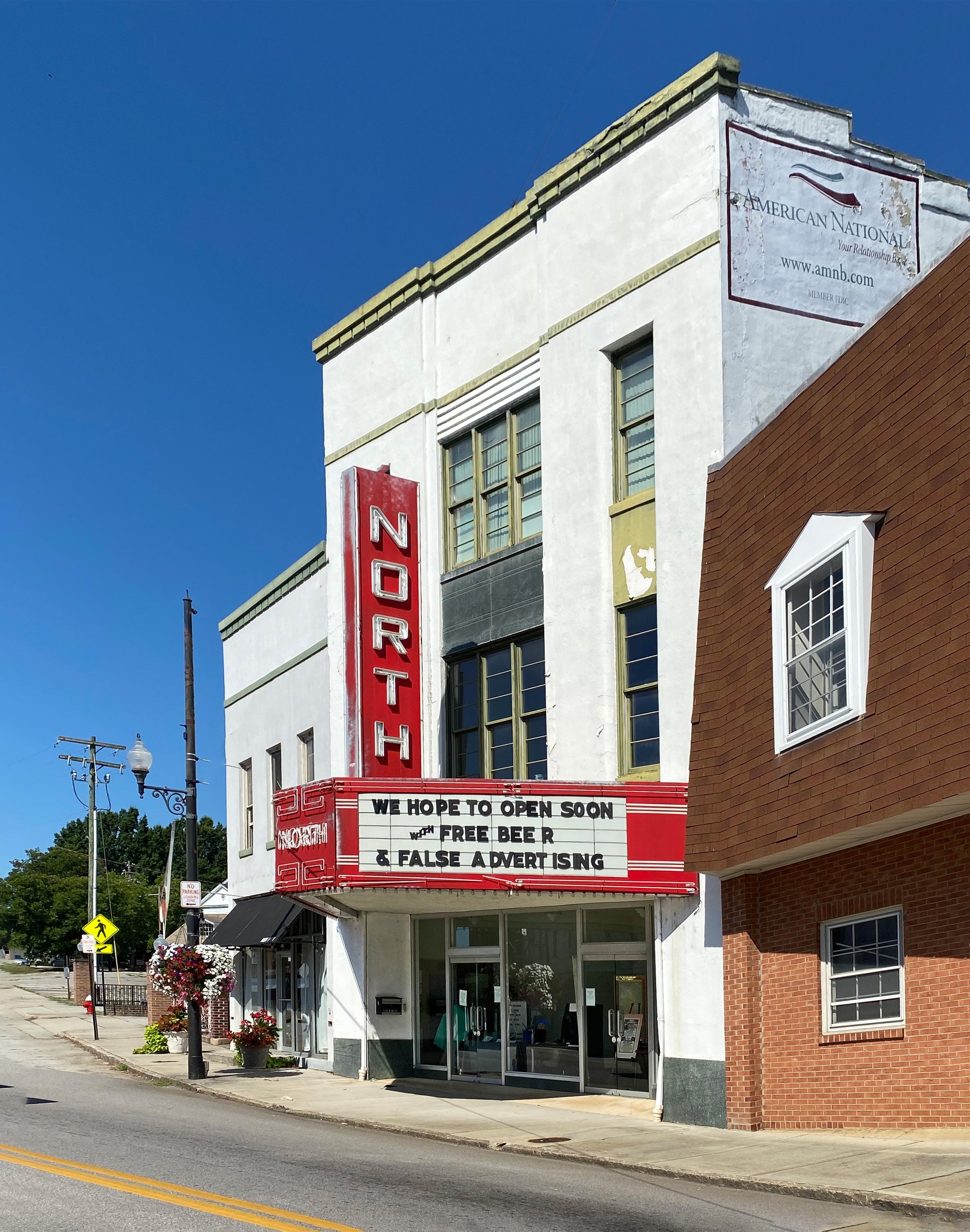
North Danville 1947 movie theater in an 1880s building that had a grocery store on the first floor and a Masonic lodge on the third floor.

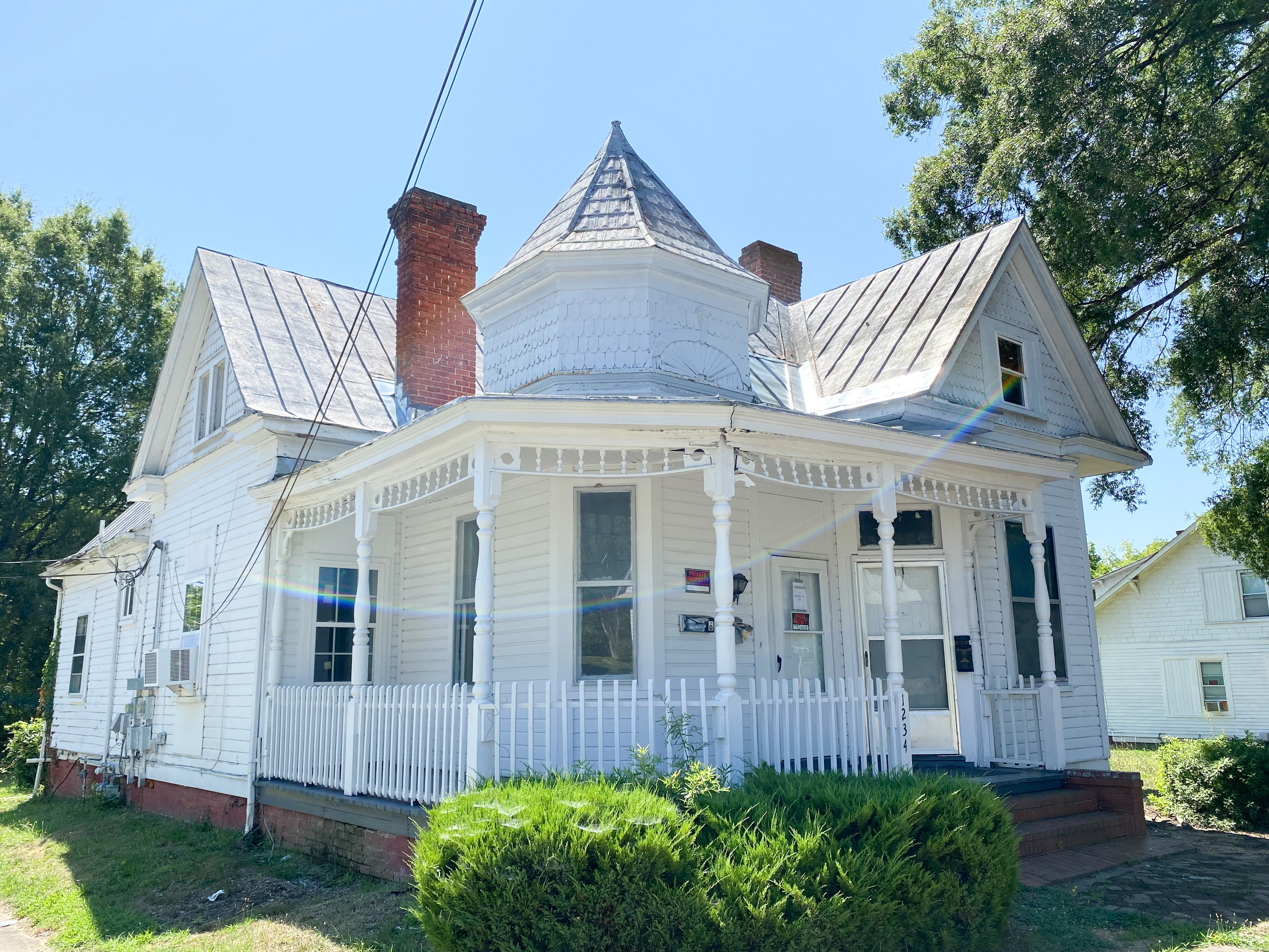
North Danville two-story 1895 frame home built with other identical homes. It has a two-story full-width porch and dual entrances.

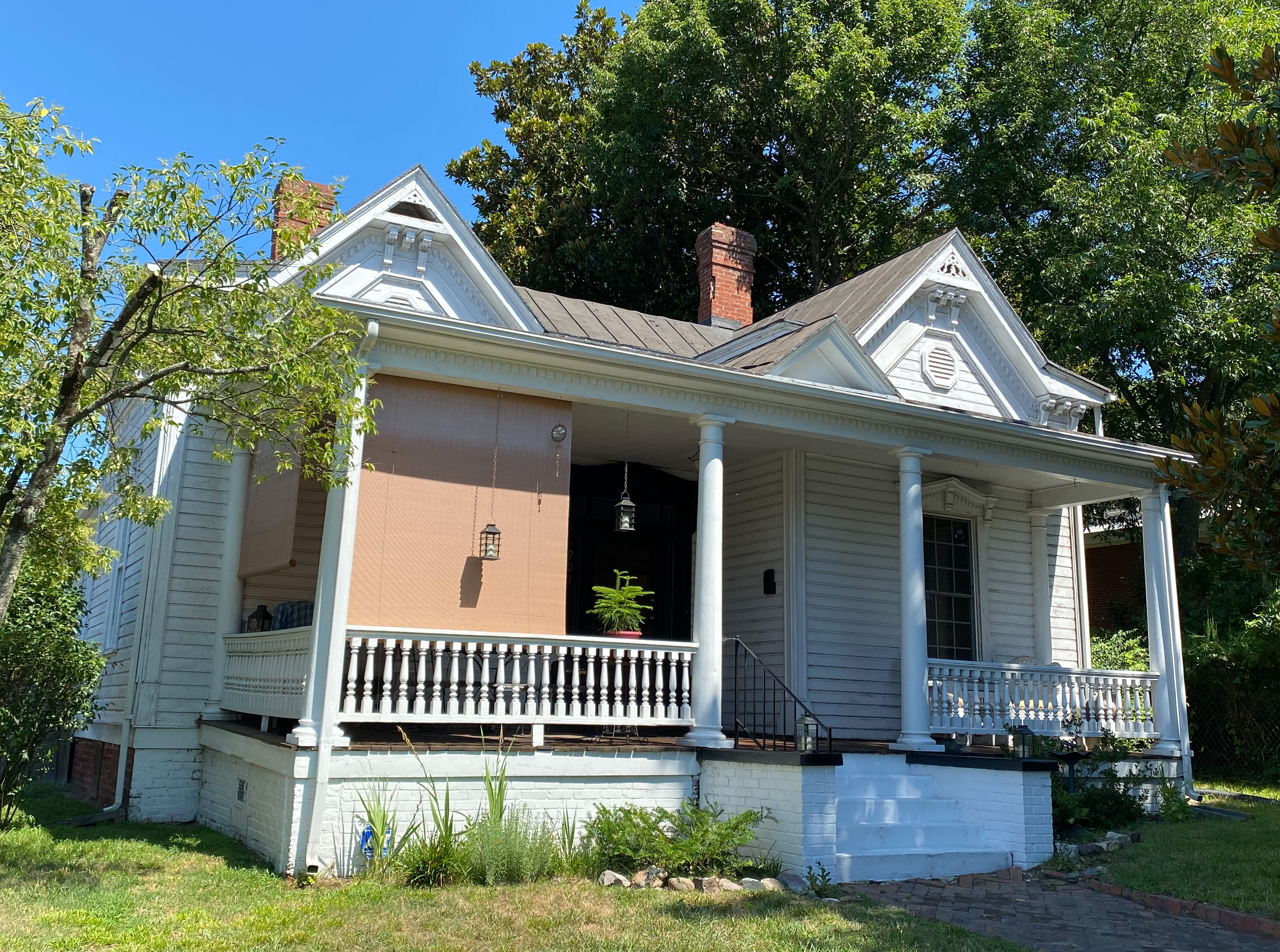
North Danville Queen Anne style home built in a gabled ell form during the late 1800s. It has original weatherboard siding. The veranda has spindle balusters and the window hoods have brackets.

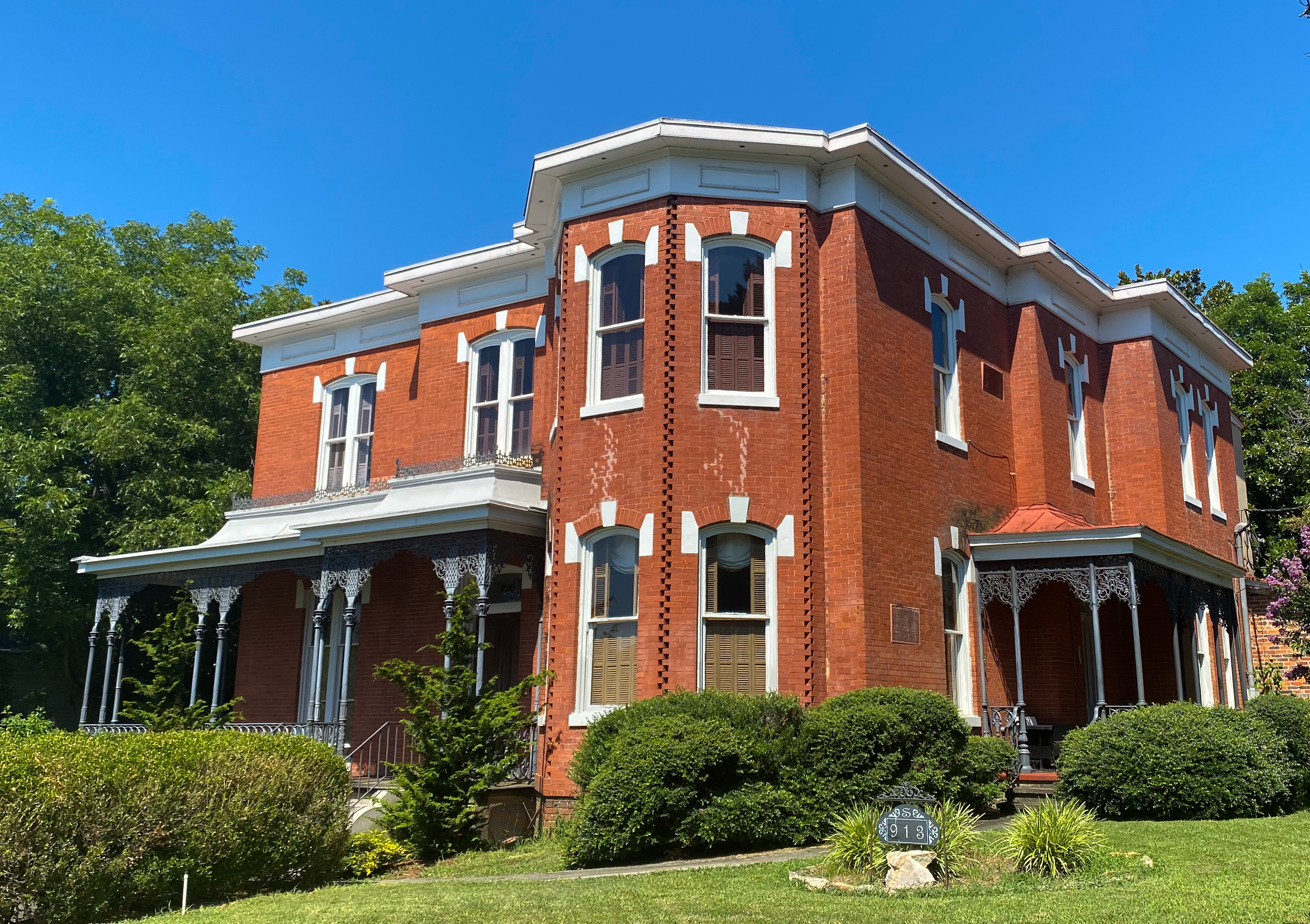
North Danville Italianate style home. This two-story brick dwelling has an original veranda, a two-story bay, arched windows with keystones, and rectangular wood panels at the cornice.
