= Danville Tobacco Warehouse and Residential District =

Historic district in Virginia, United States

- U.S. National Register of Historic Places
- U.S. Historic district
- Virginia Landmarks Register
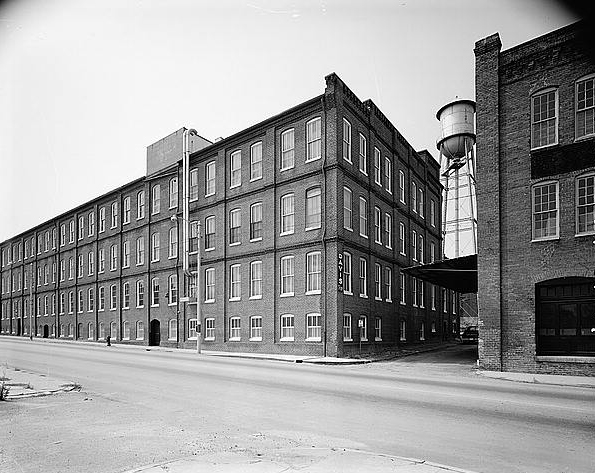
- Imperial Tobacco Company warehouse in 1978

- Location within Virginia Location within the United States
- Location: Off U.S. 58, Danville, Virginia
- Coordinates: 36°34′55″N 79°23′15″W
- Area: 260 acres (110 ha)
- Built: 1793
- Architectural style: Bungalow/craftsman, Queen Anne, Carpenter Gothic, Colonial Revival
- NRHP reference No.: 82004552 (original); 09000334 (increase)
- VLR No.: 108-0058

Significant dates
- Added to NRHP: July 14, 1982
- Boundary increase: May 21, 2009
- Designated VLR: March 18, 1980, March 19, 2009

The Danville Tobacco Warehouse and Residential District is a national historic district located at Danville, Virginia. The district includes 532 contributing buildings, 3 contributing sites, and 2 contributing structures in the city of Danville. The district reflects the late-19th century and early-20th development of Danville as a tobacco processing center and includes residential, commercial, and industrial buildings reflecting that growth. It also includes archaeological sites related to early Native American settlements in the area. Notable buildings include the American Tobacco's Harris Building, the Imperial Tobacco Company Building, Cabell Warehouse, Patton Storage Units (c. 1940), Crowell Motor Company, Municipal Power Station (1912), Riverside Cotton Mill #1 (1886), and a variety of "shotgun" houses and bungalow workers housing. Located in the district are the separately listed Danville Municipal Building and Danville Southern Railway Passenger Depot.

It was listed on the National Register of Historic Places in 1982, with a boundary increase in 2009.

== See also ==
- National Register of Historic Places listings in Danville, Virginia
