= National Register of Historic Places listings in Danville, Virginia =

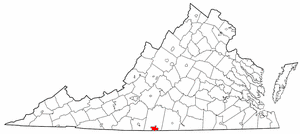
Location of Danville in Virginia

This is a list of the National Register of Historic Places listings in Danville, Virginia.

This is intended to be a complete list of the properties and districts on the National Register of Historic Places in the independent city of Danville, Virginia, United States. The locations of National Register properties and districts for which the latitude and longitude coordinates are included below, may be seen in an online map.

There are 24 properties and districts listed on the National Register in the city. Another property was once listed but has been removed.

This National Park Service list is complete through NPS recent listings posted May 29, 2026.

== Current listings ==
	Name on the Register	Image	Date listed	Location	Description
1	Cedarbrook Elementary School		April 2, 2025 (#100011605)	439 Cedarbrook Drive; 36°33′36″N 79°27′52″W	
2	Dan River Mill No. 8	Dan River Mill No. 8	March 24, 2010 (#10000095)	424 Memorial Dr. 36°35′30″N 79°23′41″W	
3	Dan's Hill	Dan's Hill	May 30, 1979 (#79003067)	4 miles (6.4 km) west of downtown Danville; 36°35′28″N 79°28′41″W	
4	Danville Historic District	Danville Historic District	April 11, 1973 (#73002207)	Roughly bounded by Main, Green, and Paxton Sts., and Memorial Hospital; also Jefferson Ave., Chestnut Pl., Grove, Chambers, and the 100 blocks of Ross and Holbrook Sts. 36°34′55″N 79°24′00″W	Second set of addresses represent a boundary increase of August 24, 2015
5	Danville Municipal Building	Danville Municipal Building	July 21, 1995 (#95000896)	418 Patton St. 36°35′11″N 79°23′31″W	
6	Danville National Cemetery	Danville National Cemetery	April 7, 1995 (#95000274)	721 Lee St. 36°34′37″N 79°23′22″W	
7	Danville Public Library	Danville Public Library	November 12, 1969 (#69000338)	975 Main St. 36°34′52″N 79°24′00″W	
8	Danville Southern Railway Passenger Depot	Danville Southern Railway Passenger Depot	July 21, 1995 (#95000895)	701 Craghead St. 36°35′03″N 79°23′02″W	
9	Danville Tobacco Warehouse and Residential District	Danville Tobacco Warehouse and Residential District	July 14, 1982 (#82004552)	Off U.S. Route 58; 36°34′50″N 79°23′18″W	Boundary increase May 21, 2009
10	Doctors Building		August 18, 2020 (#100004989)	990 Main St. & 108 Holbrook St. 36°34′52″N 79°24′04″W	
11	Downtown Danville Historic District	Downtown Danville Historic District	August 12, 1993 (#93000830)	Roughly bounded by Memorial Dr. and High, Patton, and Ridge Sts. 36°35′16″N 79°23′32″W	
12	Holbrook-Ross Street Historic District	Holbrook-Ross Street Historic District	November 18, 1997 (#97001404)	Roughly bounded by Holbrook, Ross, Gay, and Maury Sts. 36°35′12″N 79°24′10″W	
13	Hotel Danville	Hotel Danville	December 6, 1984 (#84000658)	600 Main St. 36°35′14″N 79°23′41″W	
14	Hylton Hall	Hylton Hall	September 14, 2009 (#09000726)	700 Lanier Ave. 36°34′04″N 79°25′34″W	
15	Langhorne House	Langhorne House	February 1, 2006 (#05001586)	117 Broad St. 36°34′48″N 79°24′12″W	
16	P. Lorillard Tobacco Company Warehouse Complex		January 9, 2026 (#100012527)	946 Newgass Street; 36°34′35″N 79°23′02″W	
17	Main Street Methodist Episcopal Church South	Main Street Methodist Episcopal Church South	December 6, 1990 (#90001822)	767 Main St. 36°35′05″N 79°23′47″W	
18	Mechanicsville Historic District	Mechanicsville Historic District	May 19, 2014 (#14000231)	Floyd, High, N. Ridge, Monroe, and Upper Sts. 36°35′20″N 79°23′47″W	
19	North Danville Historic District	North Danville Historic District	January 15, 2004 (#03001432)	Roughly bounded by Riverside Dr., Claiborne St., the Leemont Cemetery, Novle Ave., and Scales St. 36°35′51″N 79°23′05″W	
20	Penn-Wyatt House	Penn-Wyatt House	September 7, 1979 (#79003317)	862 Main St. 36°35′00″N 79°23′56″W	
21	Schoolfield Historic District		December 3, 2020 (#100005881)	Park Ave., Park Cir., Memorial Dr., Dan R., Laurel Ave., Rutledy Cr., Fairfield and Selma Aves. 36°34′34″N 79°25′40″W	
22	Schoolfield School Complex	Schoolfield School Complex	June 3, 2009 (#09000392)	31 Baltimore Ave. 36°34′03″N 79°25′26″W	
23	Schoolfield Welfare Building	Schoolfield Welfare Building	March 1, 2011 (#11000064)	917 W. Main St. 36°34′09″N 79°25′27″W	
24	Winslow Hospital		September 11, 2024 (#100010813)	709 Betts Street; 36°34′09″N 79°23′59″W	

== Former listings ==
	Name on the Register	Image	Date listed	Date removed	Location	Description
1	Dan River Inc. Riverside Division Historic District	Dan River Inc. Riverside Division Historic District	May 11, 2000 (#00000480)	July 29, 2016	Both sides of Dan River roughly bounded by Union St. Dam, Main St. Bridge, and Riverside and Memorial Drs.; also 424 Memorial Dr. 36°35′34″N 79°23′50″W	424 Memorial represents Dan River Mill No. 8, a boundary increase of March 24, 2010

== See also ==
- List of National Historic Landmarks in Virginia
- National Register of Historic Places listings in Virginia
- National Register of Historic Places listings in Pittsylvania County, Virginia
