= Holbrook House =

Holbrook House or Holbrook Farm may refer to:

== Places in England ==
- Holbrook Farm, land common to Melksham Without and Broughton Gifford parishes, Wiltshire

== Places in the United States ==
- Hatch House (Greensboro, Alabama), also known as Holbrook House, NRHP-listed
- William Holbrook House, Davenport, Iowa, listed on the NRHP in Scott County, Iowa
- Dr. Amos Holbrook House, Milton, Massachusetts, NRHP-listed
- Charles Holbrook House, Sherborn, Massachusetts, NRHP-listed
- Sylvanus Holbrook House, Uxbridge, Massachusetts, NRHP-listed
- Richard Holbrook Houses, Waltham, Massachusetts, NRHP-listed
- Holbrook Farm (Traphill, North Carolina), NRHP-listed, National Register of Historic Places listings in Wilkes County, North Carolina
- Deacon John Holbrook House, Brattleboro, Vermont, listed on the NRHP in Windham County, Vermont
- Dr. Fisk Holbrook Day House, Wauwatosa, Wisconsin, NRHP-listed

== See also ==
- Holbrook Bridge (disambiguation)
- Holbrook Square Historic District, Holbrook, Massachusetts, NRHP-listed
- Holbrook-Ross Street Historic District, Danville, Virginia, listed on the NRHP in Danville, Virginia
