= Schoolfield Welfare Building =

Historic building in Danville, Virginia

- U.S. National Register of Historic Places
- U.S. Historic district – Contributing property
- Virginia Landmarks Register
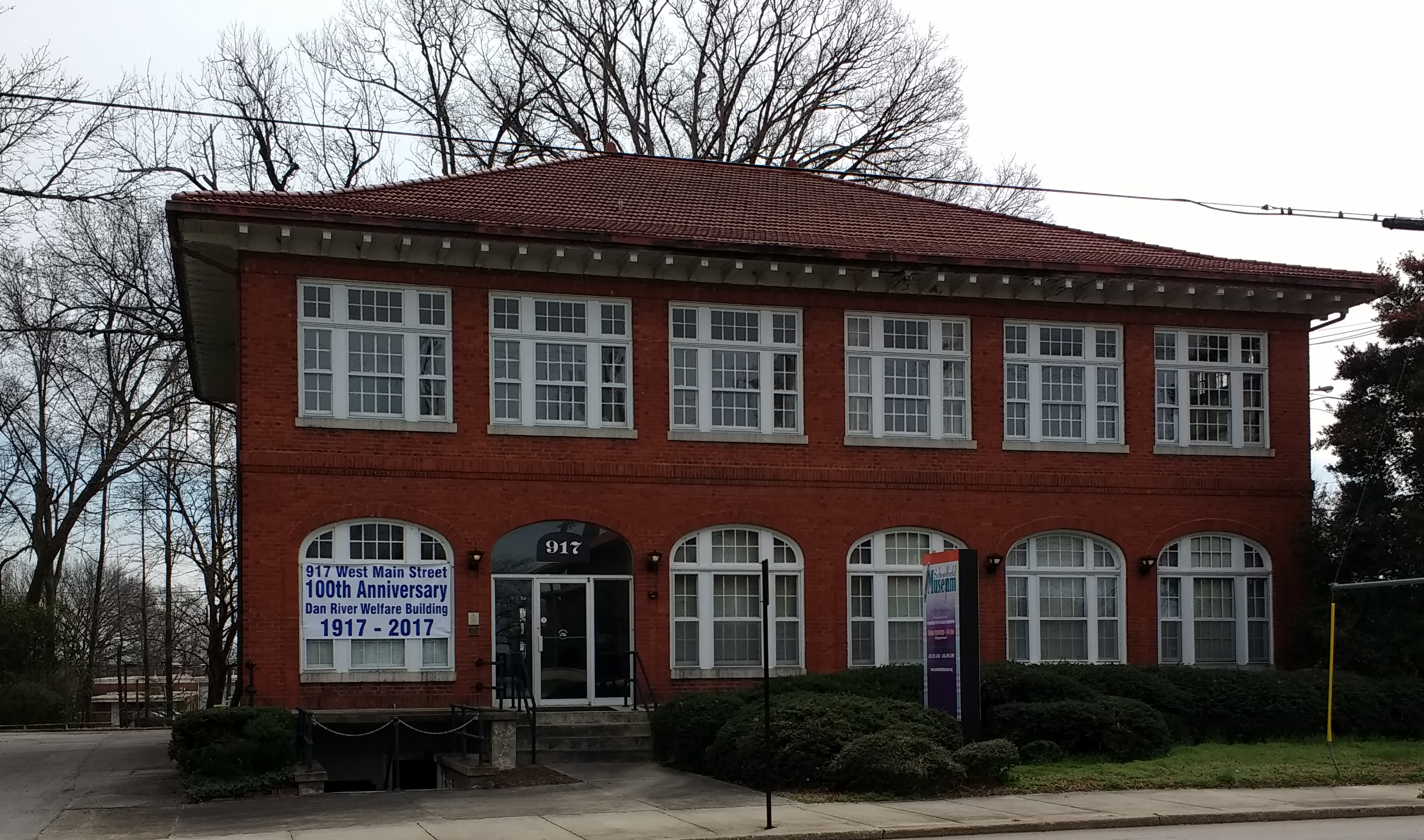

- Location within Virginia Location within the United States
- Location: 917 West Main St., Danville, Virginia
- Coordinates: 36°34′11″N 79°25′26″W
- Area: 0.75 acres (0.30 ha)
- Built: 1917, 1938
- Architect: J. Bryant Heard
- Architectural style: Mission; Classical Revival; Rustic
- Website: schoolfieldpresents.com
- Part of: Schoolfield Historic District (ID100005881)
- NRHP reference No.: 11000064
- VLR No.: 108-5065-0083

Significant dates
- Designated NRHP: March 1, 2011
- Designated CP: December 3, 2020
- Designated VLR: December 16, 2010

The Schoolfield Welfare Building, now known as Schoolfield Presents, is a historic function hall at 917 West Main Street in Danville, Virginia.

== History ==
The architecturally eclectic brick two-story building was built 1916-17 by Dan River Inc. within the company town. The building originally served as a combination medical clinic, daycare, and meeting space.

The non-profit Schoolfield Preservation Foundation purchased the building in 2007, and has since been renamed to Schoolfield Presents. The building was listed on the National Register of Historic Places in 2011. As part of the Caesars Virginia casino redevelopment, part of the building will be turned into a coworking space.

== Architecture ==
The building has a Mission-style tile hip roof, with extended eaves supported by brackets. The building housed meeting spaces, a day-care center, and a medical clinic, as well as providing a large function space. A kindergarten playhouse made out of false logs and daubing was added to the property in 1938.

== See also ==
- Schoolfield School Complex
- Hylton Hall
- National Register of Historic Places listings in Danville, Virginia
