= Hylton Hall =

Demolished historic building in Virginia, US

- U.S. National Register of Historic Places
- Virginia Landmarks Register
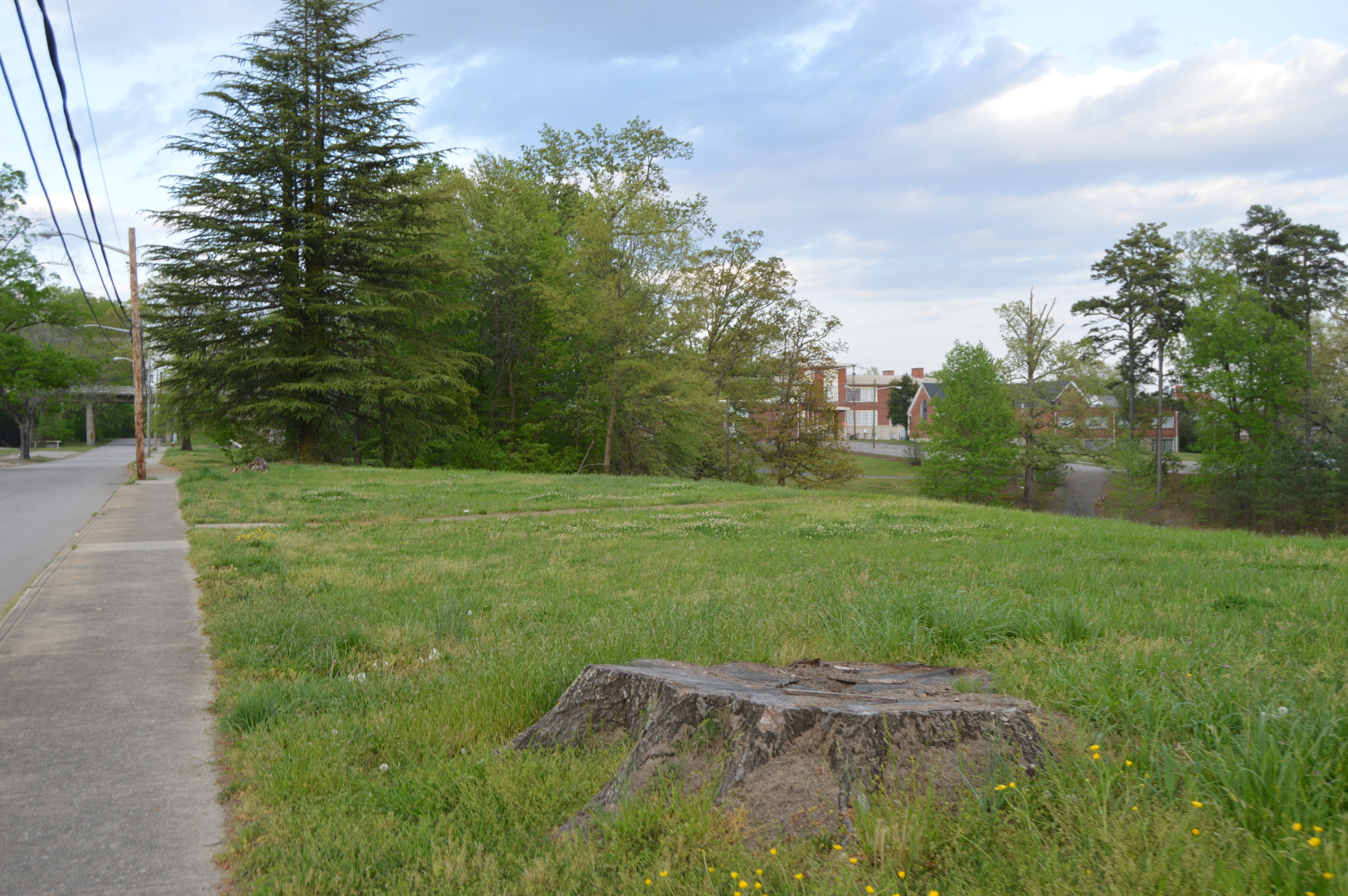
- Overview of the site

- Location within Virginia Location within the United States
- Location: 700 Lanier Ave., Danville, Virginia
- Coordinates: 36°34′3″N 79°25′35″W
- Area: 3.4 acres (1.4 ha)
- Built: 1918
- Architect: Heard, Cardwell & Craighill
- Architectural style: Classical Revival
- NRHP reference No.: 09000726
- VLR No.: 108-5065-0082

Significant dates
- Added to NRHP: September 14, 2009
- Designated VLR: June 18, 2009

Hylton Hall was a historic dormitory building located at Danville, Virginia. It was built about 1918, and was a six-story, five-bay, H-shaped brick and frame building in the Classical Revival style. The front facade featured a full-height entry portico supported by classical columns and the building was topped by a roof with various shapes and pitches. Also on the property was a contributing a one-story shop building built about 1928. It was built as a hotel-style dormitory for single female workers of The Riverside & Dan River Cotton Mills, Incorporated (Dan River Mills). It continued as a residential facility until 1948 when it was converted to offices.

On April 15, 2012, a fire ruled to be arson destroyed Hylton Hall. During demolition, a secret room filled with records from the 1800s until 2004 was located.

It was listed on the National Register of Historic Places in 2009.

== See also ==
- Schoolfield School Complex
- Schoolfield Welfare Building
- National Register of Historic Places listings in Danville, Virginia
