= Sutherlin =

Sutherlin is a surname. Notable people with the surname include:

- John Sutherlin (born 1936), bridge player
- Peggy Sutherlin (born 1937), bridge player
- William T. Sutherlin (1822–1893), most famous for opening his home to Jefferson Davis and his cabinet the week before Robert E. Lee surrendered
- Sutherlin, Oregon
