= Holbrook Bridge =

Holbrook Bridge may refer to:

- Holbrook Bridge (State Route 77, Holbrook, Arizona), listed on the National Register of Historic Places in Navajo County, Arizona
- Holbrook Bridge (U.S. Route 70, Holbrook, Arizona), listed on the National Register of Historic Places in Navajo County, Arizona

== See also ==
- Holbrook House (disambiguation)
