= List of mayors of Danville, Virginia =

Mayors of the city of Danville, Virginia, USA

The following is a list of mayors of the city of Danville, Virginia, USA.

== Mayors ==
- James Lanier, ca.1833
- Nathaniel T. Green
- Thomas Rawlins
- John Dickenson
- Thomas P. Atkinson
- R. W. Williams
- Samuel C. Brewer
- Hobson Johns
- Ptolomy L. Watkins
- A. W. C. Terry
- T. H. C. Grasty
- William T. Sutherlin, 1855-1861
- W. T. Clark
- James M. Walker
- W. H. Wooding
- J. B. Lowry
- H. W. Cole
- James C. Luck
- George C. Ayres
- John H. Johnston, 1882-1884
- Wm. P. Graves, 1884
- R. V. Barksdale
- Harry Wooding
- Edmund B. Meade
- W. E. Gardner, ca.1943
- Everett E. Carter, ca.1949
- Curtis V. Bishop, ca.1952-1956
- Charles H. Harris, 1980-1984
- Samuel Kushner 1984-1986
- Seward Anderson 1986-1996
- E. Linwood Wright, ca.1996-1998
- Ruby B. Archie, 1998-2000
- John C. Hamlin, ca.2004
- Sherman M. Saunders, 2008-2016
- Alonzo L. Jones, 2018–present

== See also ==
- Danville Municipal Building
- Danville history
