= Holbrooks–Ross Street Historic District =

Historic district in Virginia, United States

- Holbrook–Ross Street Historic District
- U.S. National Register of Historic Places
- U.S. Historic district
- Virginia Landmarks Register
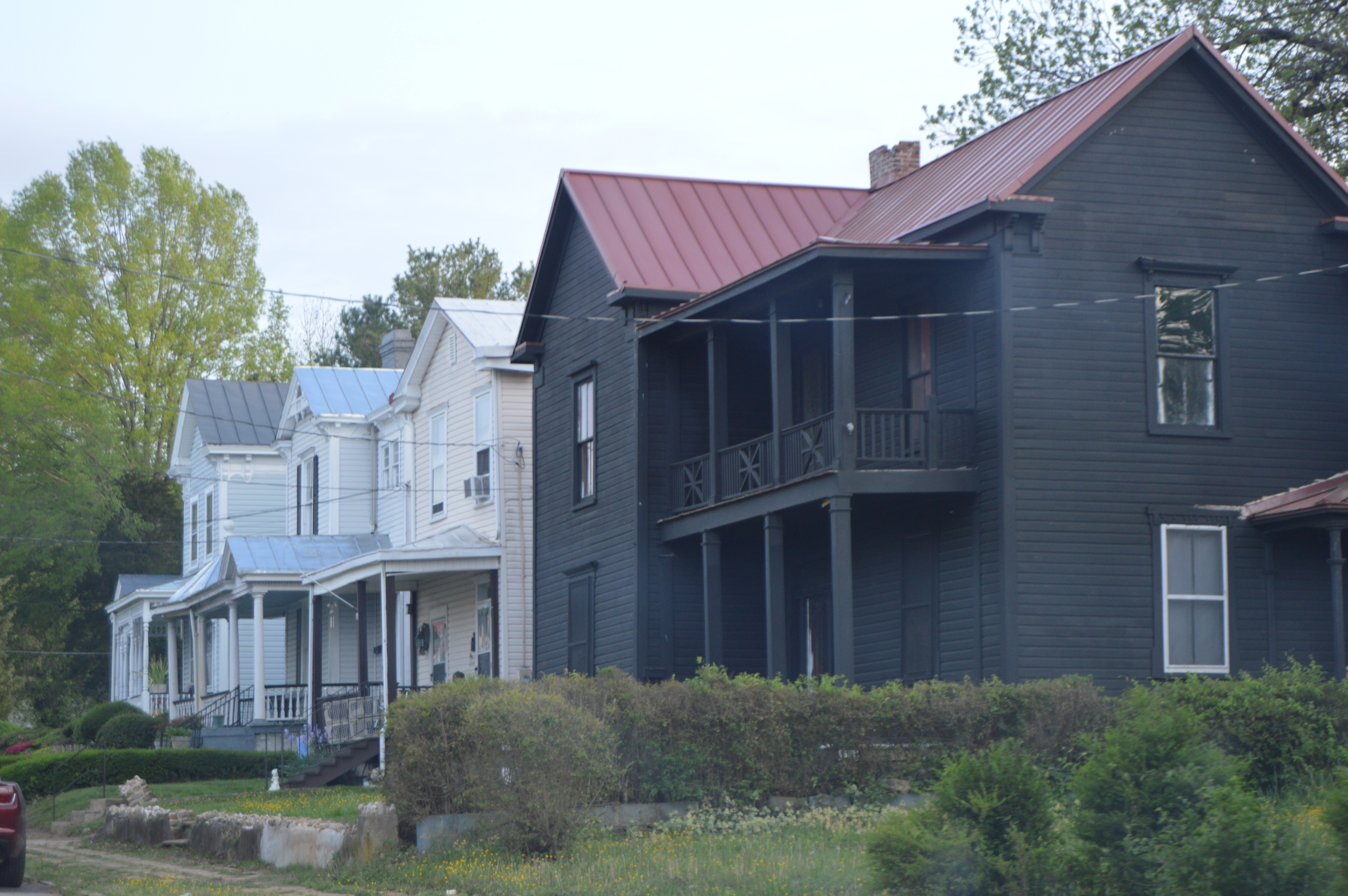
- Holbrook Street houses

- Location within Virginia Location within the United States
- Location: Roughly bounded by Holbrook, Ross, Gay, and Maury Sts., Danville, Virginia
- Coordinates: 36°35′16″N 79°24′11″W
- Area: 34 acres (14 ha)
- Built: 1870
- Architect: Hargraves, John; Pleasants, J.R.
- Architectural style: Italianate, Queen Anne
- NRHP reference No.: 97001404
- VLR No.: 108-0180

Significant dates
- Added to NRHP: November 18, 1997
- Designated VLR: July 2, 1997

Holbrook–Ross Street Historic District is a national historic district located in Danville, Virginia. The district includes 107 contributing buildings in a primarily African-American neighborhood of Danville. It includes a full range of late 19th and early 20th century residential, commercial, and institutional structures. The majority of the houses are single-family dwellings that were built between 1880 and 1910, and includes notable examples of vernacular Italianate and Queen Anne styles. Notable buildings include the Williams House (c. 1890), Hargraves-Geary House (c. 1890), Tisden House (c. 1930), Leroy Johnson House (c. 1940), Broadnax Apartment (c. 1930), Calvary Baptist Church (1896), Holbrook Street Presbyterian Church (c. 1910), Loyal Baptist Church (1924), Wesley AME Church (1939), Westmoreland Middle School (1936), and the Annex Building (1925). Located in the district are the separately listed Hotel Danville and the Danville Municipal Building.

It was listed on the National Register of Historic Places in 1997.
