= Danville Historic District (Danville, Virginia) =

Historic district in Virginia, United States

- U.S. National Register of Historic Places
- U.S. Historic district
- Virginia Landmarks Register
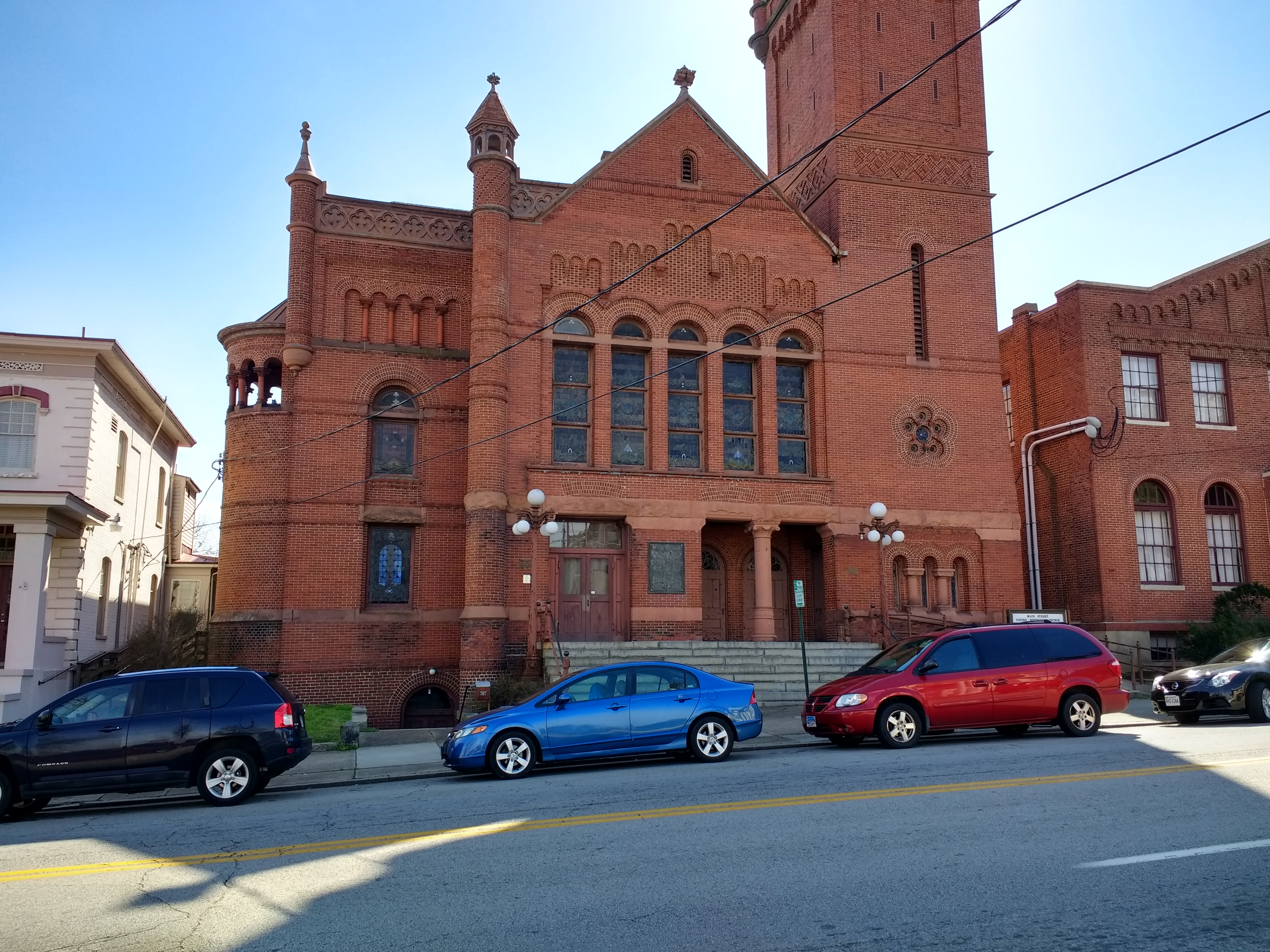
- Main Street Methodist Episcopal Church South, a church in the historic district

- Location within Virginia Location within the United States
- Location: Roughly bounded by Main, Green, and Paxton Sts., and Memorial Hospital, Danville, Virginia
- Coordinates: 36°34′54″N 79°24′5″W
- Area: 110 acres (45 ha)
- Architectural style: Romanesque, Gothic Revival
- NRHP reference No.: 73002207
- VLR No.: 108-0056

Significant dates
- Added to NRHP: April 11, 1973
- Designated VLR: November 9, 1972

The Danville Historic District, also known as the Millionaire's Row and Old West End Historic District, is a national historic district located at Danville, Virginia. In 1973, the 110-acre (45 ha) district included 272 contributing buildings. They are considered the finest and most concentrated collection of Victorian and Edwardian residential architecture in Virginia. It includes notable examples of the Gothic Revival and Romanesque Revival styles. Located in the district is the separately listed Langhorne House, Penn-Wyatt House, and the Sutherlin Mansion, the last official residence of President Jefferson Davis.

It was listed on the National Register of Historic Places in 1973.
