= Schoolfield School Complex =

Historic buildings in Danville, Virginia

- U.S. National Register of Historic Places
- U.S. Historic district – Contributing property
- Virginia Landmarks Register
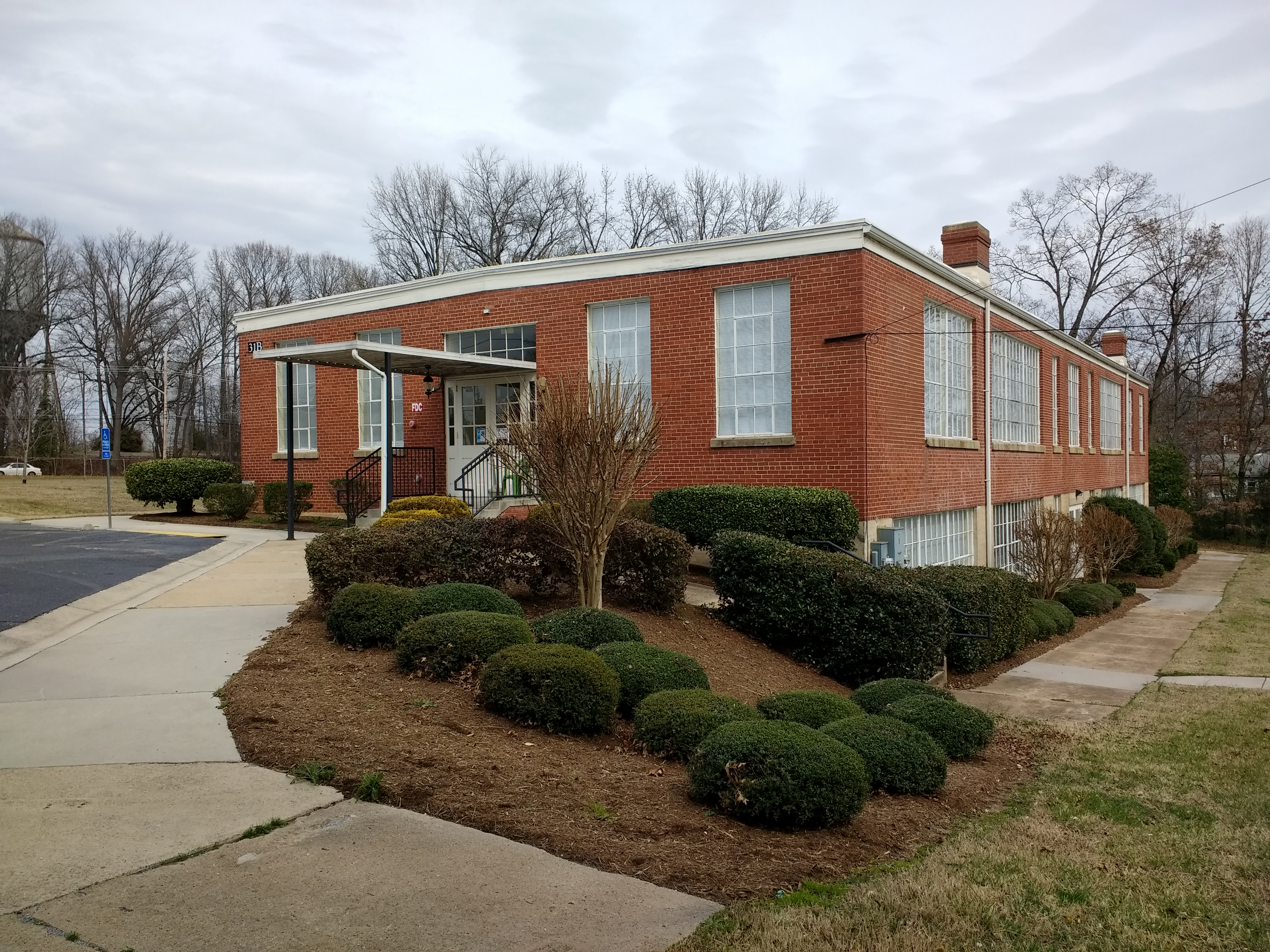
- Building B

- Location within Virginia Location within the United States
- Location: 31 Baltimore Ave., Danville, Virginia
- Coordinates: 36°34′05″N 79°25′27″W
- Area: 4.5 acres (1.8 ha)
- Built: 1912-1913, 1936-1937, 1939-1940
- Architect: Pettit, Charles G. Jr.
- Architectural style: Prairie School, Georgian Revival
- Part of: Schoolfield Historic District (ID100005881)
- NRHP reference No.: 09000392
- VLR No.: 108-5065-0081

Significant dates
- Designated NRHP: June 3, 2009
- Designated CP: December 3, 2020
- Designated VLR: March 19, 2009

The Schoolfield School Complex, now the Westmoreland Schoolfield senior apartments, is a three-building complex of historic school buildings located in Danville, Virginia.

== History ==
The Riverside & Dan River Cotton Mill Company built the complex as part of the mill company town named "Schoolfield Village." Originally most boys only attended through seventh grade, when they became eligible to work in the mills.

In 1951, the City of Danville the Schoolfield area but the elementary school continued operating for decades by the Danville Public Schools. By the mid-1990s, the school was moved to a new building and the complex served as the Danville City Schools' Central Office Annex.

In 2006 and 2007, the buildings were converted to affordable apartments for residents 55 years old or more. The complex was added as a single listing on the National Register of Historic Places in 2009 and recognized as a contributing property to the Schoolfield Historic District in 2020.

== Architecture ==
- Building A: Schoolfield Elementary School was built in 1912 or 1913. Architect Charles G. Pettit, Jr., designed the two-and-a-half-story Prairie School style brick building includes deep eaves that cap a narrow elongated structure, multi-paned massed windows, and horizontal masonry banding. It has an entry tower and addition added in 1933.
- Building B: The vocational center was built in 1936 or 1937. The brick vernacular building has a marble cornerstone indicating that the building also served as the lodge for the Motega Tribe Number 80 of Improved Order of the Red Men. That fraternal organization bases their rituals on perceived Native American customs.
- Building C: Schoolfield High School was built across the street in 1939 or 1940. The New Deal Public Works Administration constructed the brick, one-story, Georgian Revival style building according to a brass plaque. The elementary school later moved into this larger building.

== Gallery ==
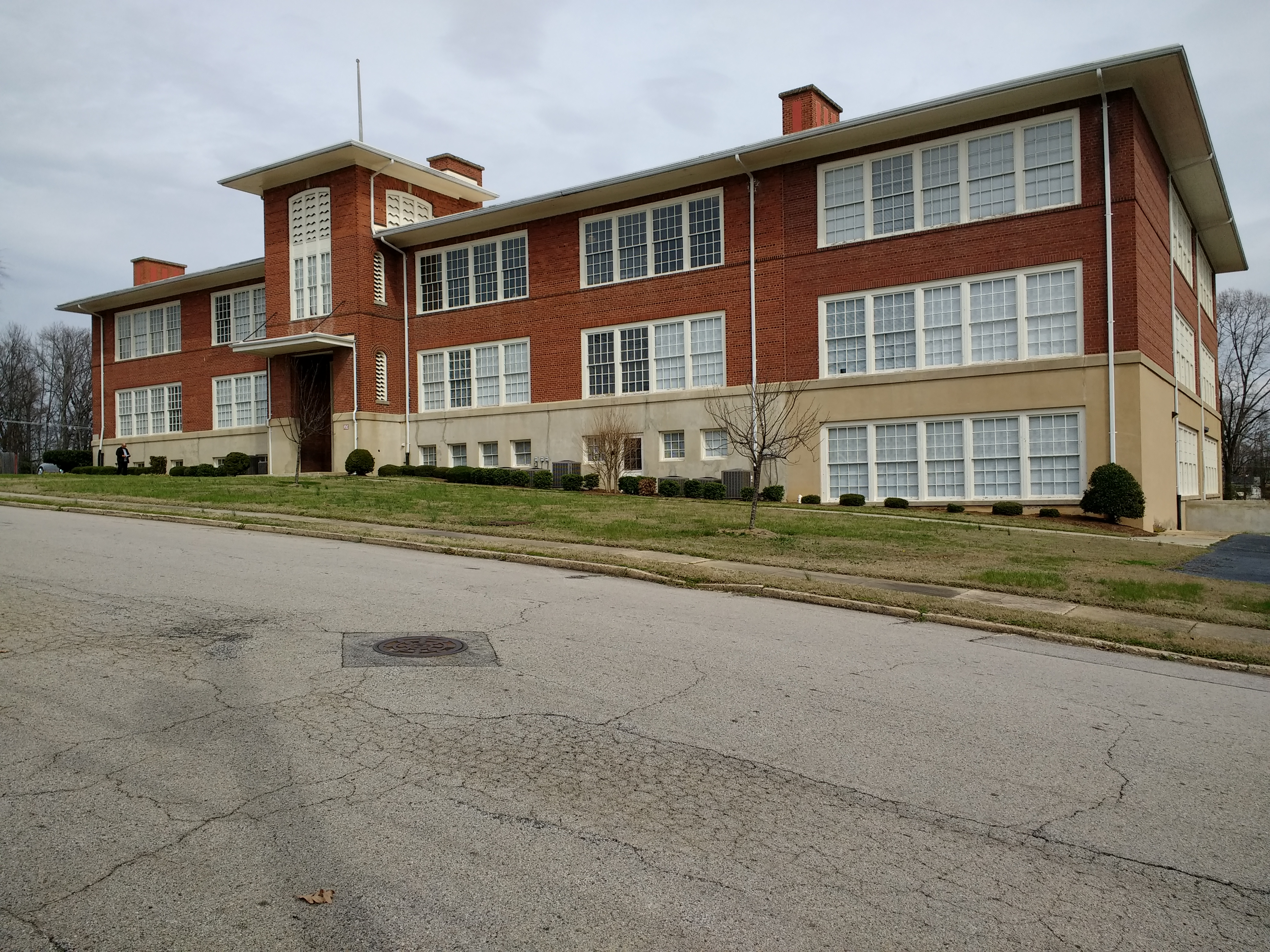
Building A

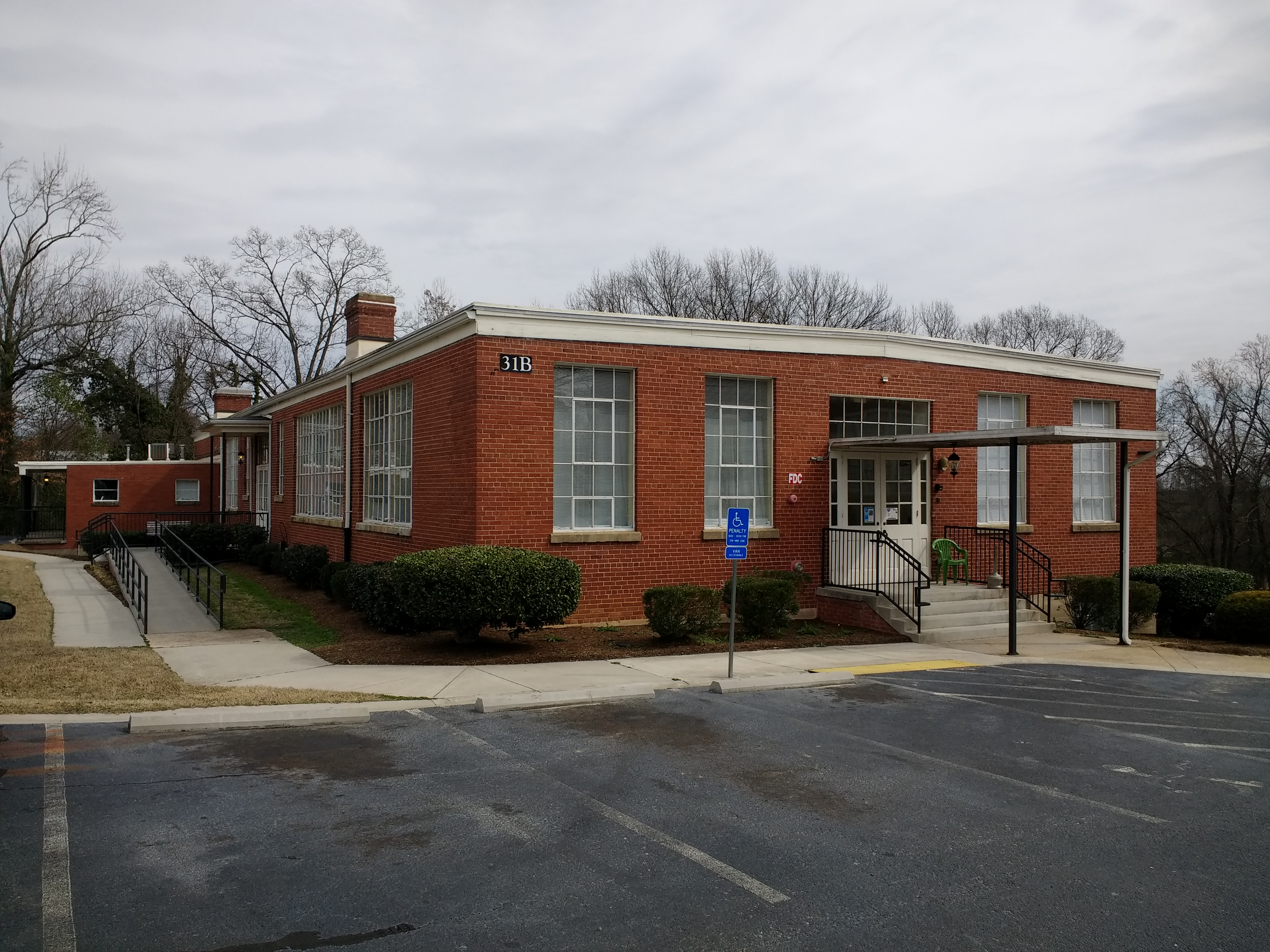
Building B

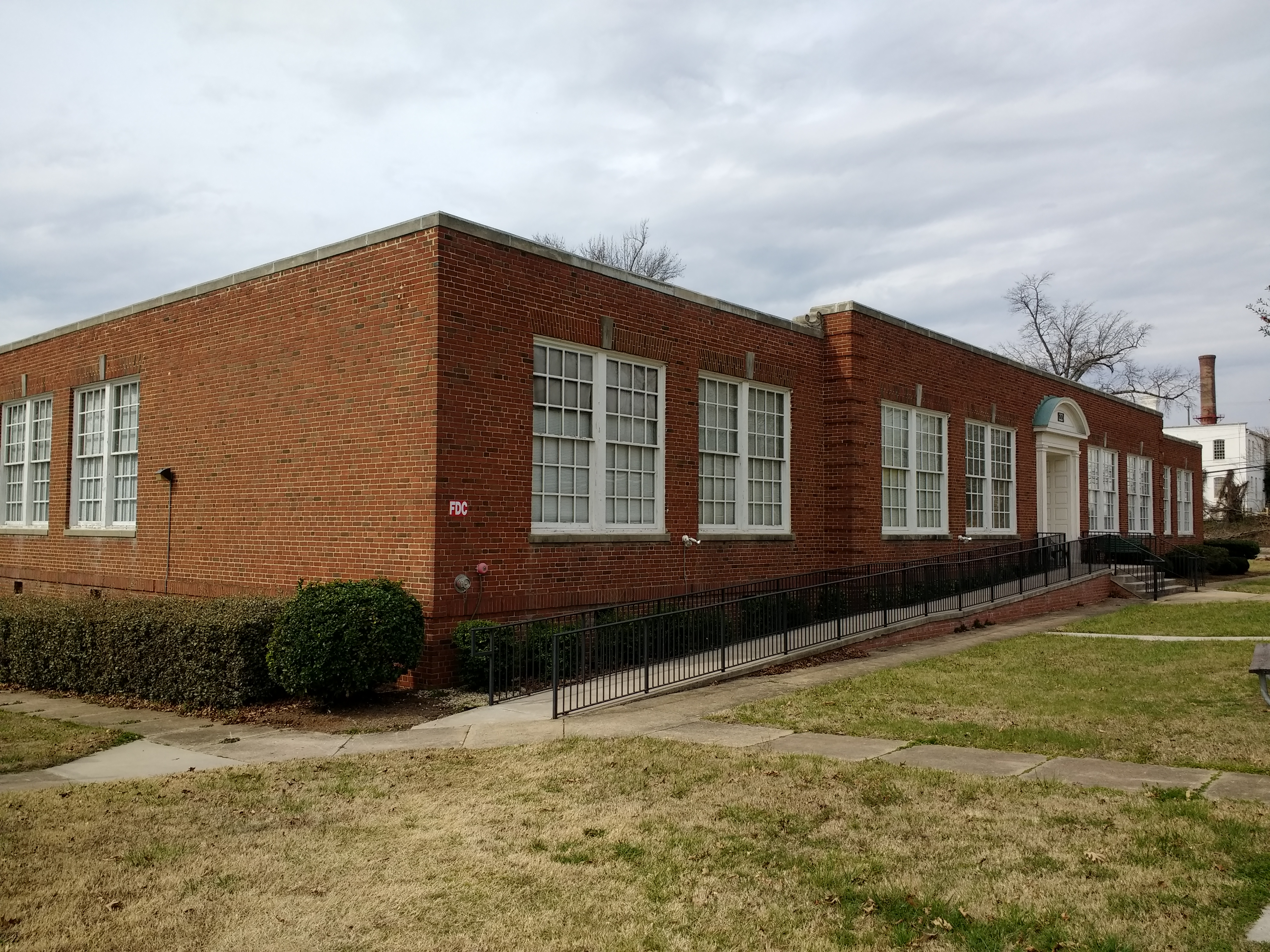
Building C

== See also ==
- Hylton Hall
- Schoolfield Welfare Building
- National Register of Historic Places listings in Danville, Virginia
- List of Improved Order of Red Men buildings and structures
