= Caesars Virginia =

Casino in Virginia, United States

- Interactive map of Caesars Virginia
- Location: Danville, Virginia; 1100 West Main Street; 36°34′08″N 79°25′40″W
- Opened: May 15, 2023 (temporary); December 17, 2024 (permanent)
- No. of rooms: 320
- Gaming space: 40,000 sq ft (3,700 m^{2})
- Casino type: Land-based
- Owner: Caesars Entertainment and EBCI Holdings, LLC
- Architect: Marnell Companies
- Website: Official site

Caesars Virginia is a casino and hotel in Danville, Virginia, that officially opened on December 17, 2024. It is located in the Schoolfield Mill district, on the site of the former Dan River Mills finishing plant. It is owned in partnership between Caesars Entertainment and the Eastern Band of Cherokee Indians. On May 15, 2023, the temporary Danville Casino was opened.

== History ==
In 2020, Virginia legislators passed a bill allowing the establishment of casinos. Still, they limited the option to five eligible host cities: Portsmouth, Richmond, Norfolk, Danville, and Bristol. An additional condition was set that each city must hold a referendum on the question of whether to allow casino gaming in the city.

Plans for the casino in Danville started in December 2019 when the city of Danville began seeking proposals of a possible casino that must included either the White Mill or Schoolfield site. In August 2020, the Danville City Council gave unanimous approval to Caesars Entertainment's proposed $400 million premier resort and casino plan. On September 3, 2020, the city of Danville and Caesars Entertainment officials signed a development agreement for a resort casino at the former Dan River Mills industrial complex in Schoolfield. In November 2020, Danville voters approved the casino referendum, with 13,022 voting Yes (69%) to 5,941 voting No (29%). In August 2022, the Eastern Band of Cherokee Indians announced a joint venture with Caesars Entertainment on a revised $650 million project to develop Caesars Virginia. Construction on Caesars Virginia began the same month, slated to be completed in late 2024. Three historic smokestacks from the original mill will be retained as part of the plan.

In November 2022, Caesars Entertainment announced plans to open a temporary casino in Danville by Mid-2023 In April 2023, the Virginia Lottery Board issued a facility operator's license to Caesars Virginia to operate Virginia's third casino. On May 15, 2023, the 40,000-square-foot (3,700 m^{2}) temporary Danville Casino was opened. Resembling a large white tent on the outside, the temporary facility includes eight sportsbook betting kiosks, 740 slot machines, 25 live table games, 28 electronic table games, and a quick-service restaurant called Three Stacks.
