= Mechanicsville Historic District =

Historic district in Virginia, United States

- U.S. National Register of Historic Places
- U.S. Historic district
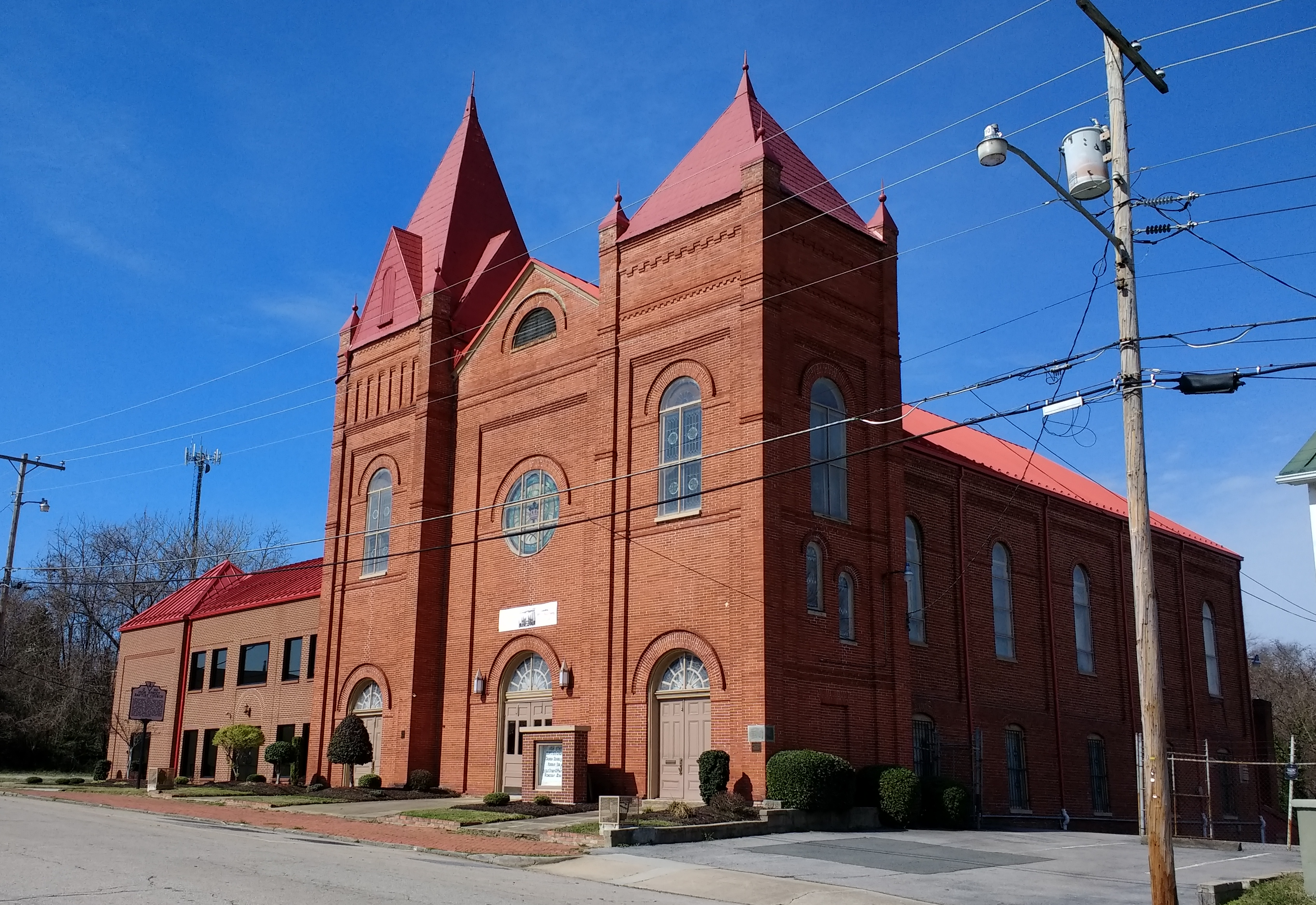
- High Street Baptist Church

- Location within Virginia Location within the United States
- Location: Roughly bounded by Floyd, High, North Ridge, & Upper Sts., Danville, Virginia
- Coordinates: 36°35′21″N 79°23′52″W
- Area: 14.35 acres (5.81 ha)
- NRHP reference No.: 14000231
- Added to NRHP: May 19, 2014

The Mechanicsville Historic District encompasses a small and cohesive working-class neighborhood west of downtown Danville, Virginia. The district is bounded by Upper Street on the northwest; North Floyd Street on the northeast; High Street on the southeast; and North Ridge Street on the southwest. This area was developed beginning roughly in 1880 as a residential district catering to workers in the nearby tobacco-processing facilities. The houses in the district are in a blend of styles, but are characterized by similar lot sizes and setbacks. The district includes two churches, and a building that originally served as a tobacco prizery (a building where tobacco leaves are packed into barrels). The neighborhood was a center of civil rights activism during the 1960s, playing host to Martin Luther King Jr. It was once somewhat larger; areas to the west and north were razed during urban redevelopment efforts.

The district was listed on the National Register of Historic Places in 2014.

== See also ==
- National Register of Historic Places listings in Danville, Virginia
