= William T. Sutherlin =

American politician

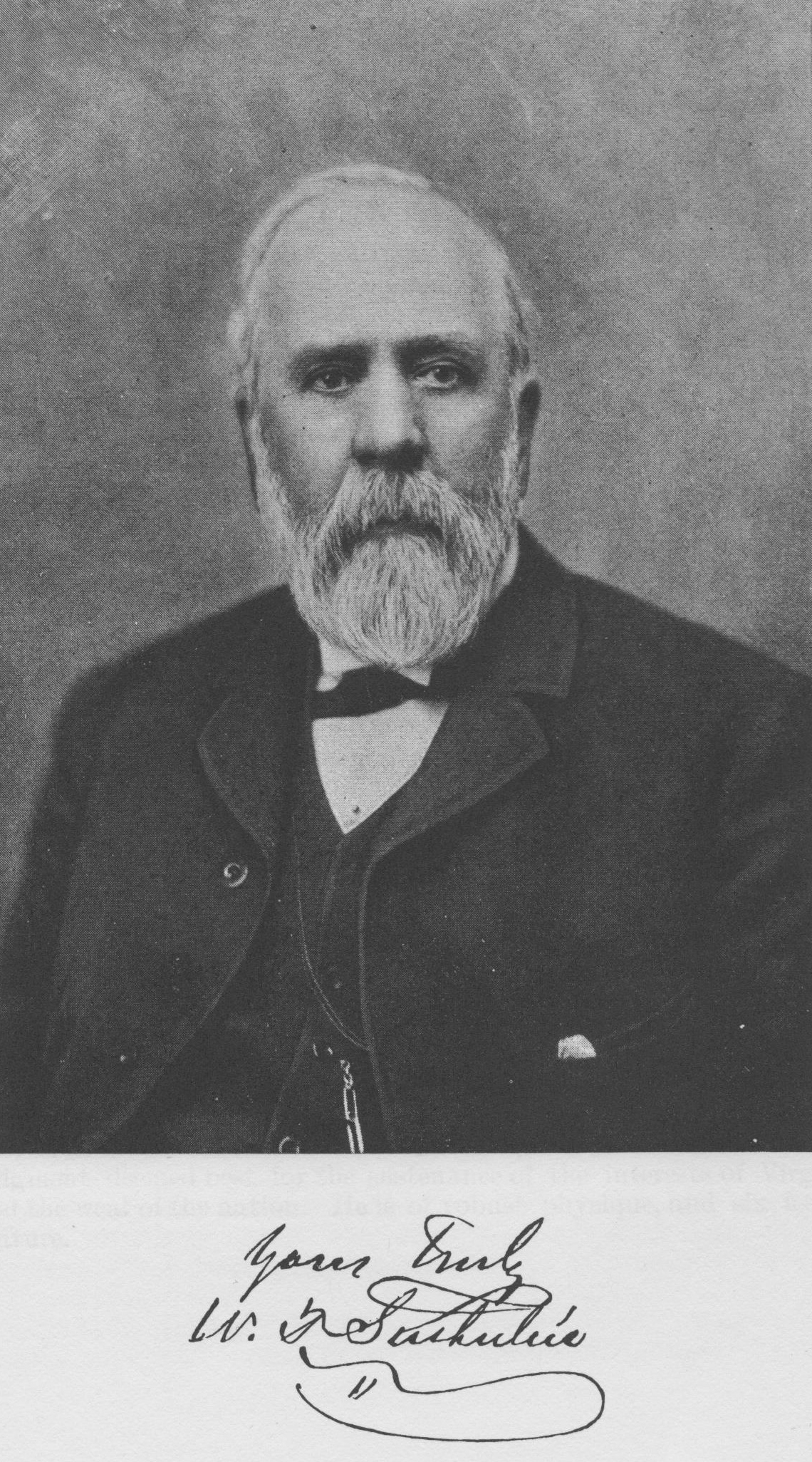

Virginia Secession Convention of 1861 delegate

Member of the Virginia House of Delegates from the Pittsylvania County district
- In office December __, 1871 – December __, 1873

Personal details
- Born: William Thomas Sutherlin; April 7, 1822 Danville, Virginia, U.S.
- Died: July 22, 1893 (aged 71) Danville, Virginia, U.S.

Military service
- Allegiance: Confederate States of America
- Branch/service: Confederate States Army
- Years of service: 1861–1865
- Rank: Major
- Unit: quartermaster
- Battles/wars: American Civil War

William Thomas Sutherlin (April 7, 1822 – July 22, 1893) was a tobacco planter, distributor, industrialist, Confederate quartermaster and politician. He served as mayor of Danville, Virginia (1855–1861), as its delegate to the Virginia Secession Convention of 1861 and later for one term in the Virginia House of Delegates (1871–1873) Sutherlin's plantation home became the temporary residence for President of the Confederate States of America Jefferson Davis and his Cabinet from April 3 – April 10, 1865, the week before Gen. Robert E. Lee surrendered the Army of Northern Virginia at Appomattox Courthouse.

== Early and family life ==
Born in 1822 to George Sanders Sutherlin and his wife, the former Polly Starlings Norman. His grandfather bought a large tract north of Danville in 1798. The Sutherlin family included at least three additional boys and two girls: John M. Sutherlin, George Haskins Sutherlin (1826–1861), Paulina Lane Sutherlin (b.1824) and Narcissa Adeline Sutherlin Hodnett (1820–1888). His youngest brother, Nathaniel Green Sutherlin (1836–1843), never reached adulthood. William T. Sutherlin married Jeanie Erwin Patrick in October 1849 in Greensboro, North Carolina. She would survive him by more than a decade, as would their daughter Janine, who married Francis Lee Smith of Alexandria, and bore a daughter.

== Career ==
A planter and industrialist, William T. Sutherlin used enslaved black labor, owning nine boys 10–16 years old and 25 adult males between 18 and 50 years old in 1850. An entrepreneur and industrialist, Sutherlin developed ways to improve the process of preparing the region's bright leaf tobacco for market, as there was great demand for this commodity. Before the Civil War, Sutherlin was the first Virginian to apply steam power to hydraulic tobacco presses; he owned and operated the second-largest tobacco factory in the state. Sutherlin also founded and served as the first president of the Bank of Danville.

In 1855, Sutherlin was elected as Danville's mayor and served for 6 years. He resigned the office after being as one of its two delegates to the Virginia Convention of 1861. Sutherlin opposed secession on the initial vote, but changed his vote after Fort Sumter was fired upon on April 12, 1861.

== American Civil War ==
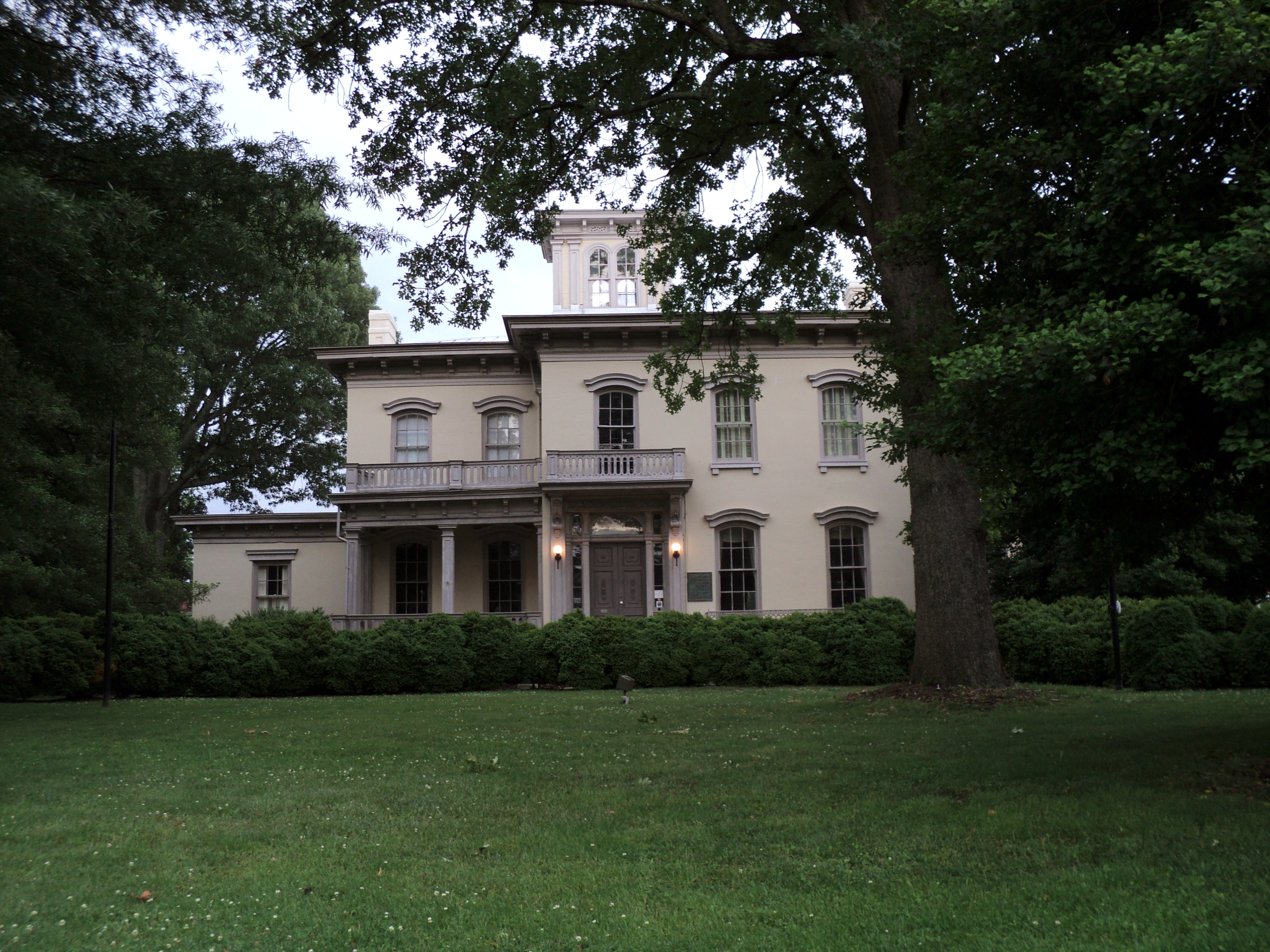
William T. Sutherlin's mansion in Danville, Virginia. Built for Sutherlin in 1859, the home became famous as the temporary residence of Jefferson Davis, President of the Confederate States of America.

In his forties and with worse health than his brother George H. Sutherlin, who volunteered, became a lieutenant in the 38th Virginia Infantry and died in Richmond, in December 1861, Sutherlin could not serve in the active military. Appointed instead as Quartermaster of Danville, a primary Confederate supply depot and arsenal. Sutherlin rose to the rank of major, and his duties included oversight of food, medicine, and arms supply. Major Sutherlin also allowed his tobacco factory to be used as a prison for captured Union soldiers.

As Union troops were on the verge of capturing the Confederate capitol of Richmond, Virginia, on April 3, 1865, Confederate President Jefferson Davis and his cabinet fled south on the Richmond and Danville Railroad for Danville. Sutherlin opened his home to the beleaguered executive and his cabinet as a temporary residence until April 10. Here Davis wrote and signed his last official proclamation as President of the Confederacy, dissolving the government, before continuing south to Greensboro, North Carolina.

== Postwar ==
After the war, Sutherlin continued to cultivate his plantation and pursue business ventures. He became a member of the Committee of Nine which opposed provisions in the new proposed state constitution from the Virginia Constitutional Convention of 1868. In 1871 Danville and Pittsylvania County voters elected him as one of their two (part time) representatives in the Virginia General Assembly, where he served a single two-year term.

== Death and legacy ==
Sutherlin died in 1893. His papers are held by the University of North Carolina Special Collections library. The William T Sutherlin Mansion has been adapted for use as the Danville Museum of Fine Arts and History. It has been listed on the National Register of Historic Places.

== See also ==
- List of mayors of Danville, Virginia
