= Holbrook Square Historic District =

Historic district in Massachusetts, United States

- U.S. National Register of Historic Places
- U.S. Historic district
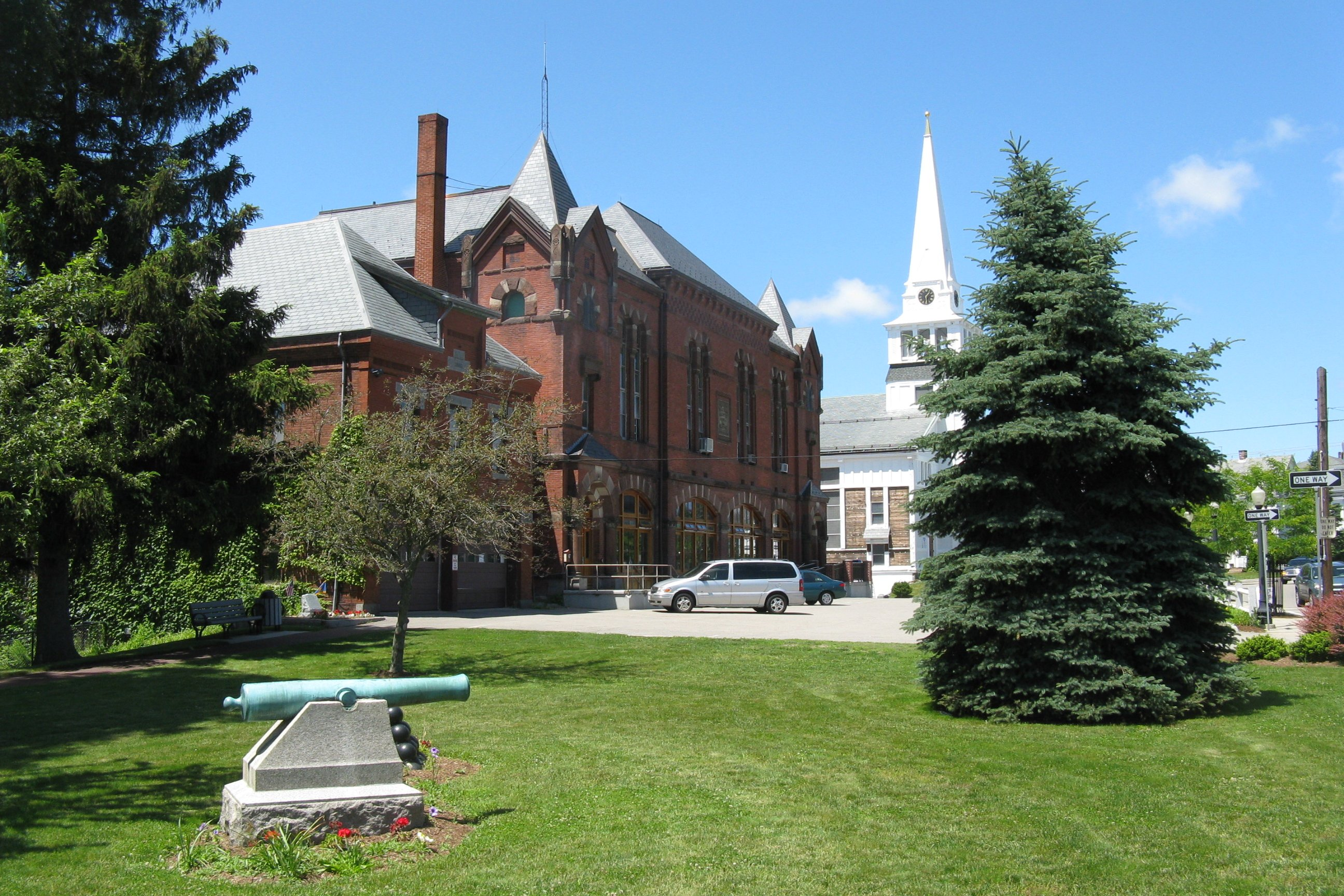
- Holbrook Town Hall

- Location within Massachusetts Location within the United States
- Location: Holbrook, Massachusetts
- Coordinates: 42°9′20″N 71°0′35″W
- Area: 2 acres (0.81 ha)
- Architect: Faxon, John Lyman; Hartwell, Henry Walker
- Architectural style: Gothic, Stick/Eastlake
- NRHP reference No.: 06000359
- Added to NRHP: May 10, 2006

The Holbrook Square Historic District encompasses the historic institutional center of Holbrook, Massachusetts. It includes three buildings: the Gothic Revival town hall, built 1878-79, the Stick style Winthrop Congregational Church (1878–80), and the 1881 Central Fire Station. These three buildings are arrayed along Mary Wales Holbrook Park, aka Holbrook Square. The square is located north and west of the junction of North Franklin Street (Massachusetts Route 37) and Union Street (Massachusetts Route 139). The district was added to the National Register of Historic Places in 2006.

== Description and history ==
The town of Holbrook was originally part of Randolph, and began to achieve a separate identity with the formation of the Second Randolph Church (or East Parish) in 1818. A schism within the East Parish led to the formation of the Winthrop Congregational Church, whose first sanctuary was built in 1857-58. The town was incorporated in 1872, at which time its first town hall was built adjacent to the church. Both buildings were destroyed in a fire in December 1877. In its aftermath, a new town hall, church, and fire station were built in the town's central square.

The town hall is the community's only significant example of High Victorian Gothic architecture. It is a substantial two story brick structure, with granite and sandstone trim elements. It was designed by John Lyman Faxon and built in 1878 and 1879 by the Norcross Brothers construction firm. The Winthrop Congregational Church was designed by the Boston firm of Hartwell and Tilden, and was built, also by the Norcross Brothers, from 1878 to 1880. It is the town's best preserved 19th-century church and an example of Stick style architecture The fire station, built in 1881, is the town's only example of Panel Brick architecture. It is a two-story brick building, with a hip roof, and two equipment bays.

== See also ==
- National Register of Historic Places listings in Norfolk County, Massachusetts
