= William T. Sutherlin Mansion =

Historic house in Virginia, United States

- U.S. National Register of Historic Places
- U.S. Historic district – Contributing property
- Virginia Landmarks Register
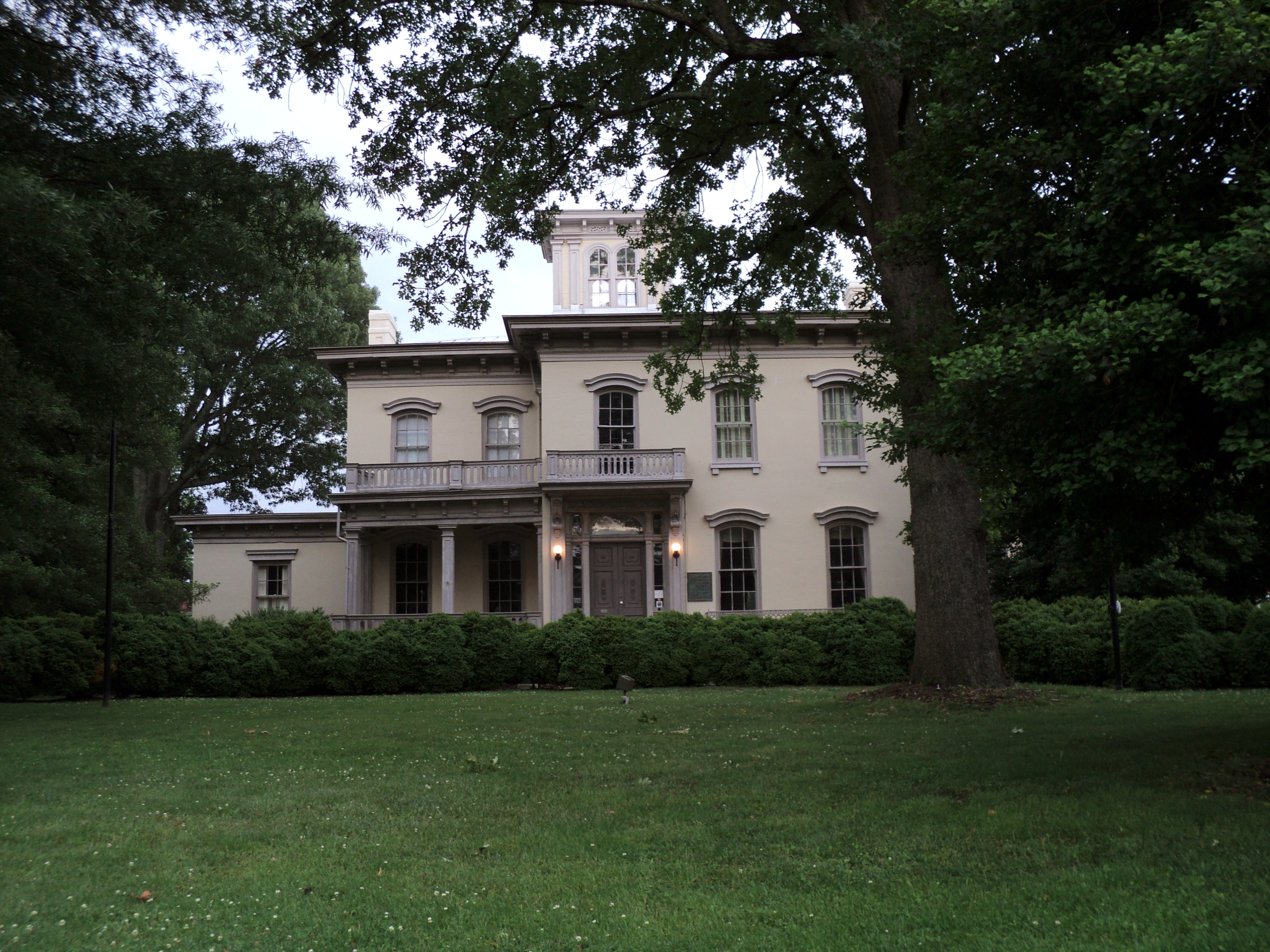
- Sutherlin Mansion, May 2010

- Location within Virginia Location within the United States
- Location: 975 Main St., Danville, Virginia
- Coordinates: 36°34′51″N 79°24′1″W
- Area: 3 acres (1.2 ha)
- Built: 1857-1858
- Architectural style: Italian Villa
- Website: danvillemuseum.org
- Part of: Danville Historic District (ID73002207)
- NRHP reference No.: 69000338
- VLR No.: 108-0006

Significant dates
- Added to NRHP: November 12, 1969
- Designated CP: April 11, 1973
- Designated VLR: May 13, 1969

Danville Museum of Fine Arts and History, also known as the William T. Sutherlin Mansion and the Confederate Memorial, is a historic home and museum building located at Danville, Virginia. It was built for Major William T. Sutherlin in 1857–1858, and is a two-story, five-bay, stuccoed building in the Italian Villa style. It features a one-story wooden porch, a shallow hipped roof surrounded by a heavy bracketed cornice and topped by a square cupola ornamented with pilasters and a bracketed cornice.

While at the house, which served as his temporary residence from April 3 to April 10, 1865, on April 4, President Jefferson Davis signed his last official proclamation as President of the Confederate States of America. On April 10, Davis was at dinner at the house when he learned of the surrender at Appomattox.

The building was listed on the National Register of Historic Places in 1969. It is located in the Danville Historic District.

The house is owned by the city and was used as the Danville Public Library from 1928 to 1972.

This mansion, after being sold to the city, became a “whites only” public library from 1928 to 1972. In the summer of 1960, Black students would decide that they wanted the library to be integrated, and staged a sit-in. To resist desegregation efforts, the library would be shut down, and would not open again until the fall of 1960. While the library now had to allow Black people into the library, it did not have to provide comfortable accommodations; and the library re-opened without chairs.

== Museum ==
Established in 1974, the museum focuses on art, history, and culture in the Dan River region. Exhibits include the historic home itself with period furnishings, five art galleries, and a permanent Civil War exhibit.
