= William Holbrook House =

Historic house in Iowa, United States

- U.S. National Register of Historic Places
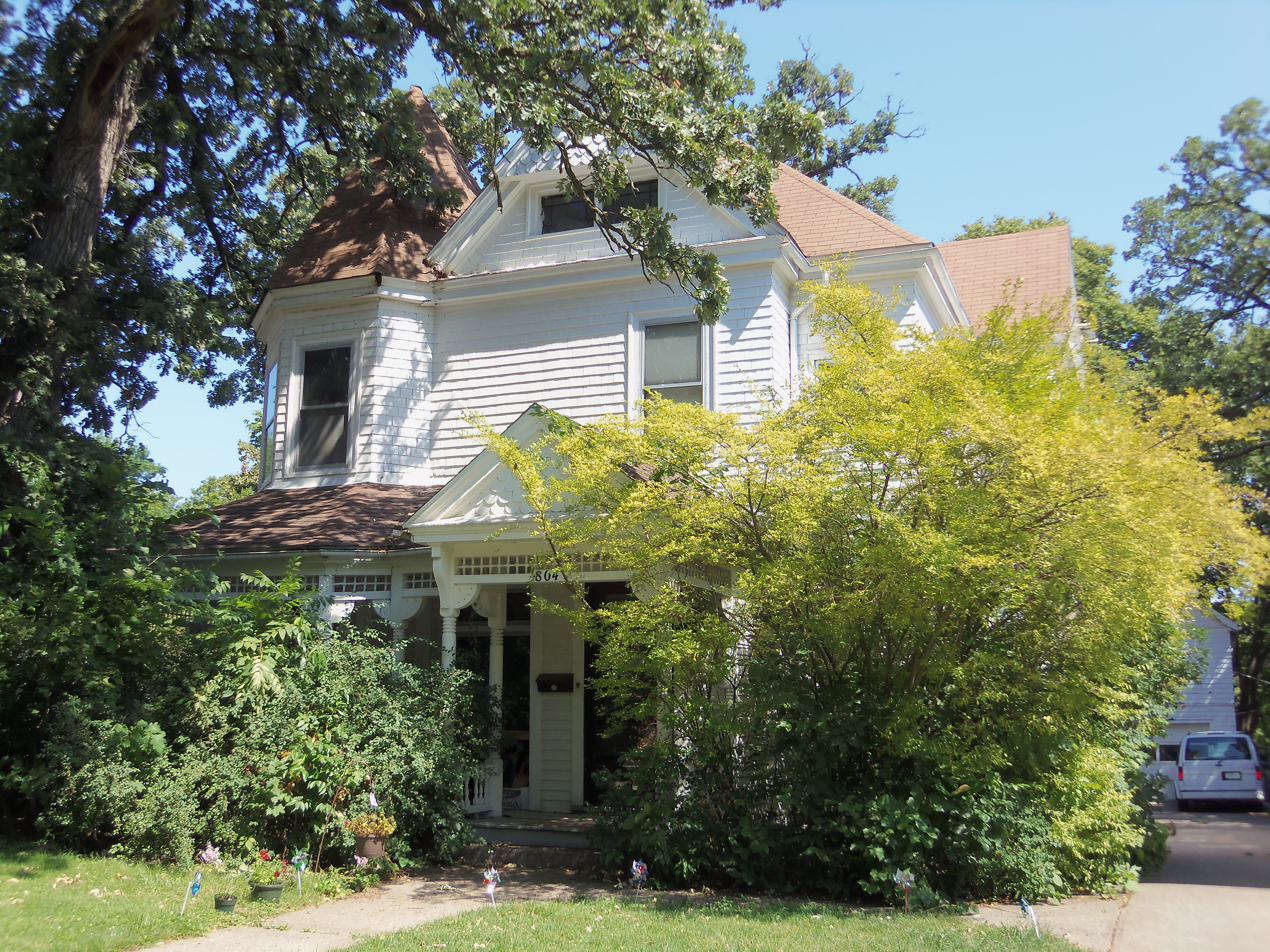

- Location within Iowa Location within the United States
- Location: 804 Kirkwood Boulevard; Davenport, Iowa
- Coordinates: 41°32′11″N 90°33′48″W
- Area: less than one acre
- Built: 1892
- Architectural style: Shingle Style/Queen Anne
- MPS: Davenport MRA
- NRHP reference No.: 84001440
- Added to NRHP: July 27, 1984

The William Holbrook House is a historic building located on the east side of Davenport, Iowa, United States. William Holbrook was a furniture and carpeting dealer. He was the first person to occupy this house. The 2½-story house features an irregular plan with several projecting pavilions, hipped roof, and the corner tower are typical of the Queen Anne style. What sets this house apart in Davenport is the exterior embellishments found in the clapboard siding, the millwork on the porch, and shingling typical of the Shingle Style. While these are not unusual in the Queen Anne style many have been re-sided in subsequent years, which makes this one stand out. The house has been listed on the National Register of Historic Places since 1984.
