= Penn–Wyatt House =

Historic house in Virginia, United States

- U.S. National Register of Historic Places
- U.S. Historic district – Contributing property
- Virginia Landmarks Register
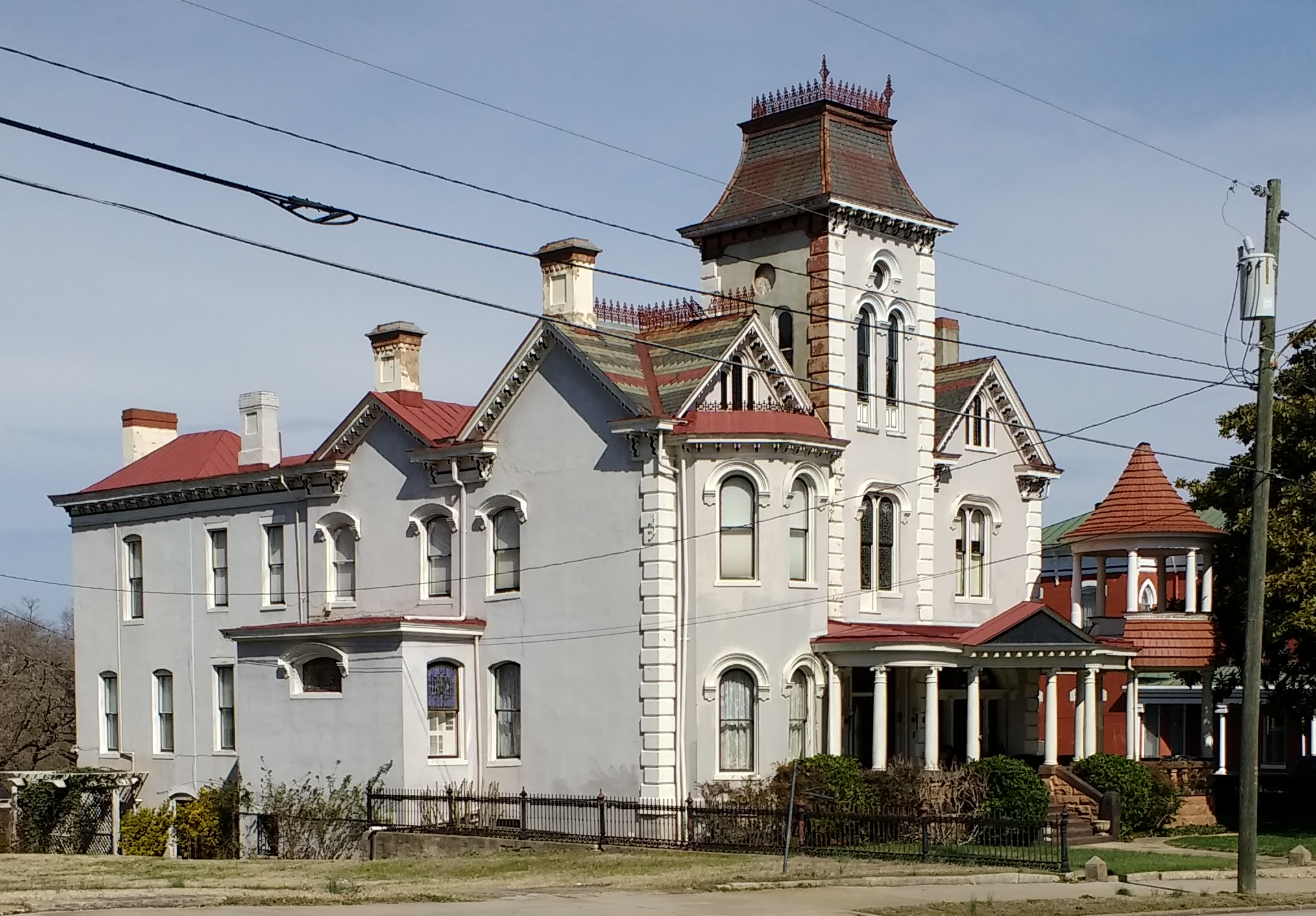

- Location within Virginia Location within the United States
- Location: 862 Main St., Danville, Virginia
- Coordinates: 36°34′57″N 79°24′0″W
- Area: 2 acres (0.81 ha)
- Built: 1876
- Architectural style: Second Empire, Italianate
- Part of: Danville Historic District (ID73002207)
- NRHP reference No.: 79003317
- VLR No.: 108-0003

Significant dates
- Added to NRHP: September 7, 1979
- Designated CP: April 11, 1973
- Designated VLR: October 17, 1978

Penn–Wyatt House, also known as the Hoffman House, is a historic home located at Danville, Virginia. It was built in 1876, and modified between 1887 and 1903. It is a two-story, stuccoed brick dwelling with Italianate- and Second Empire-style architectural elements. It features projecting bay windows, a central three-story entrance tower topped by a bell-cast mansard roof, brownstone quoining, a one-story porch with Ionic order columns, and a multi-gable roof.

It was listed on the National Register of Historic Places in 1979. It is located in the Danville Historic District.
