= Downtown Danville Historic District =

Historic district in Virginia, United States

- U.S. National Register of Historic Places
- U.S. Historic district
- Virginia Landmarks Register
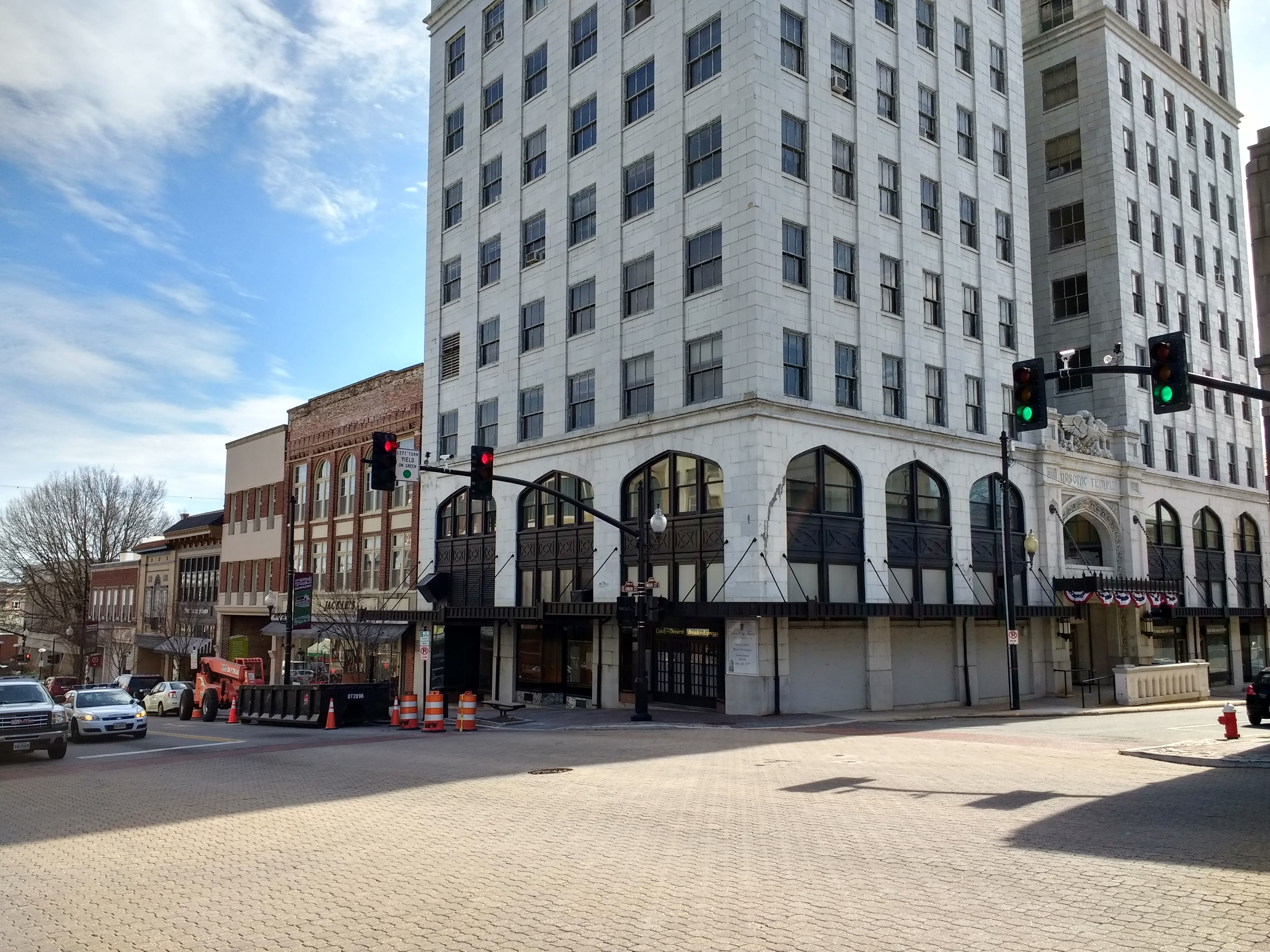

- Location within Virginia Location within the United States
- Location: Roughly bounded by Memorial Dr. and High, Patton and Ridge Sts., Danville, Virginia
- Coordinates: 36°35′14″N 79°23′38″W
- Area: 25 acres (10 ha)
- Architect: Multiple
- Architectural style: Late Gothic Revival, Romanesque, Tudor Revival
- NRHP reference No.: 93000830
- VLR No.: 108-0111

Significant dates
- Added to NRHP: August 12, 1993
- Designated VLR: August 12, 1993

The Downtown Danville Historic District is a national historic district located at Danville, Virginia. The district includes 48 contributing buildings in the central business district of Danville. It includes a wide range of commercial, industrial, and institutional building types dating from the 1870s to the present. The district includes notable examples of the Late Gothic Revival, Tudor Revival, and Romanesque Revival styles. Notable buildings include the Danville City Auditorium (1932), Morotock Manufacturing Company (1907), J. T. Stovall Tobacco Factory (1876), Kingoff Building (1892), American National Bank & Trust Co (c. 1934), Woolworth's Building (1937), Southern Amusement Building (1922), Elks Home (1912), Danville Post Office (1932), Masonic Building (1921-1922), and Danville City Market (1930s). Located in the district are the separately listed Hotel Danville and the Danville Municipal Building.

It was listed on the National Register of Historic Places in 1993.

Downtown Danville Historic District Contributing Buildings

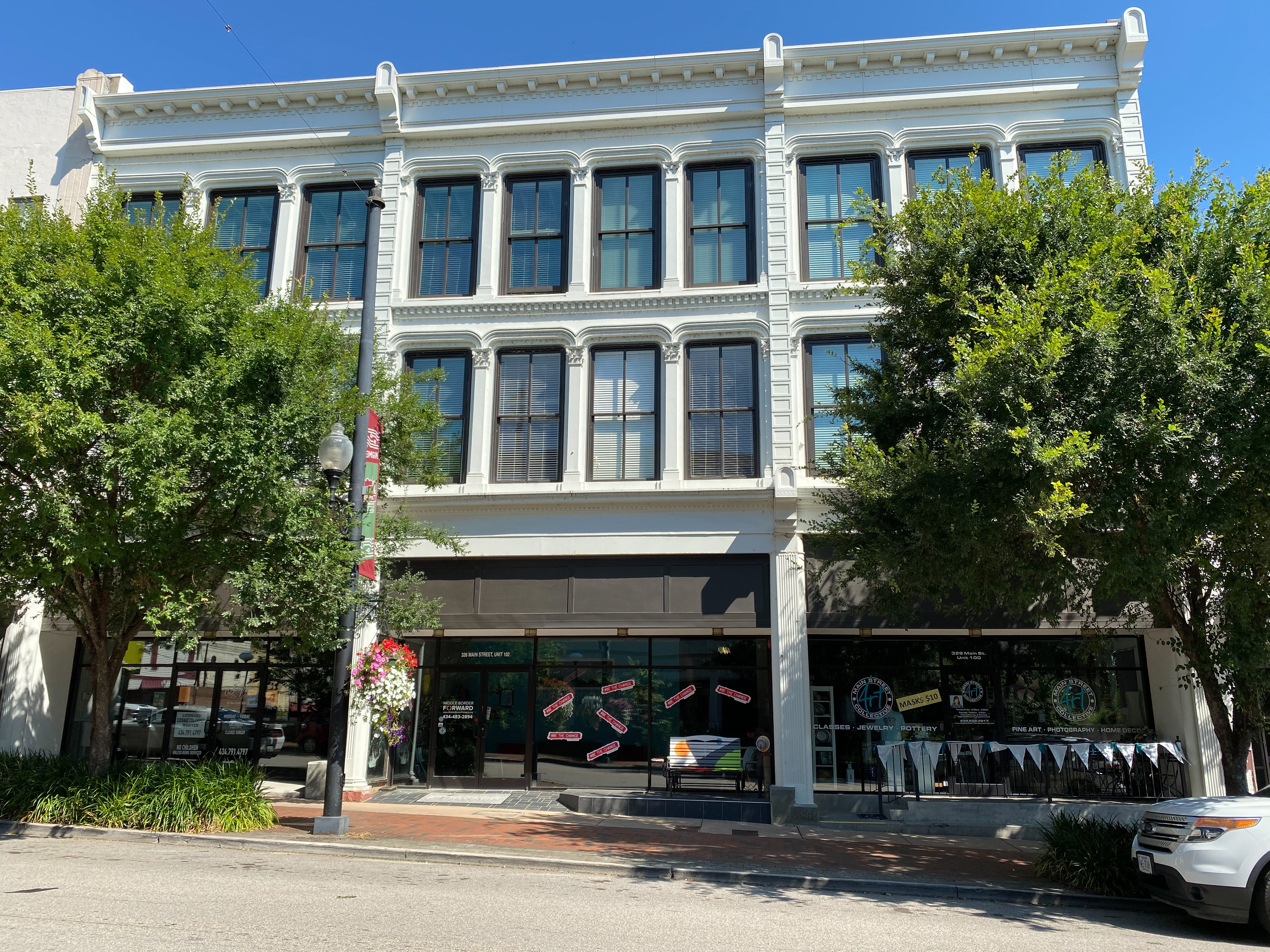
The Pace Building was built in 1875 with an ornate iron facade. Danville's oldest commercial building.

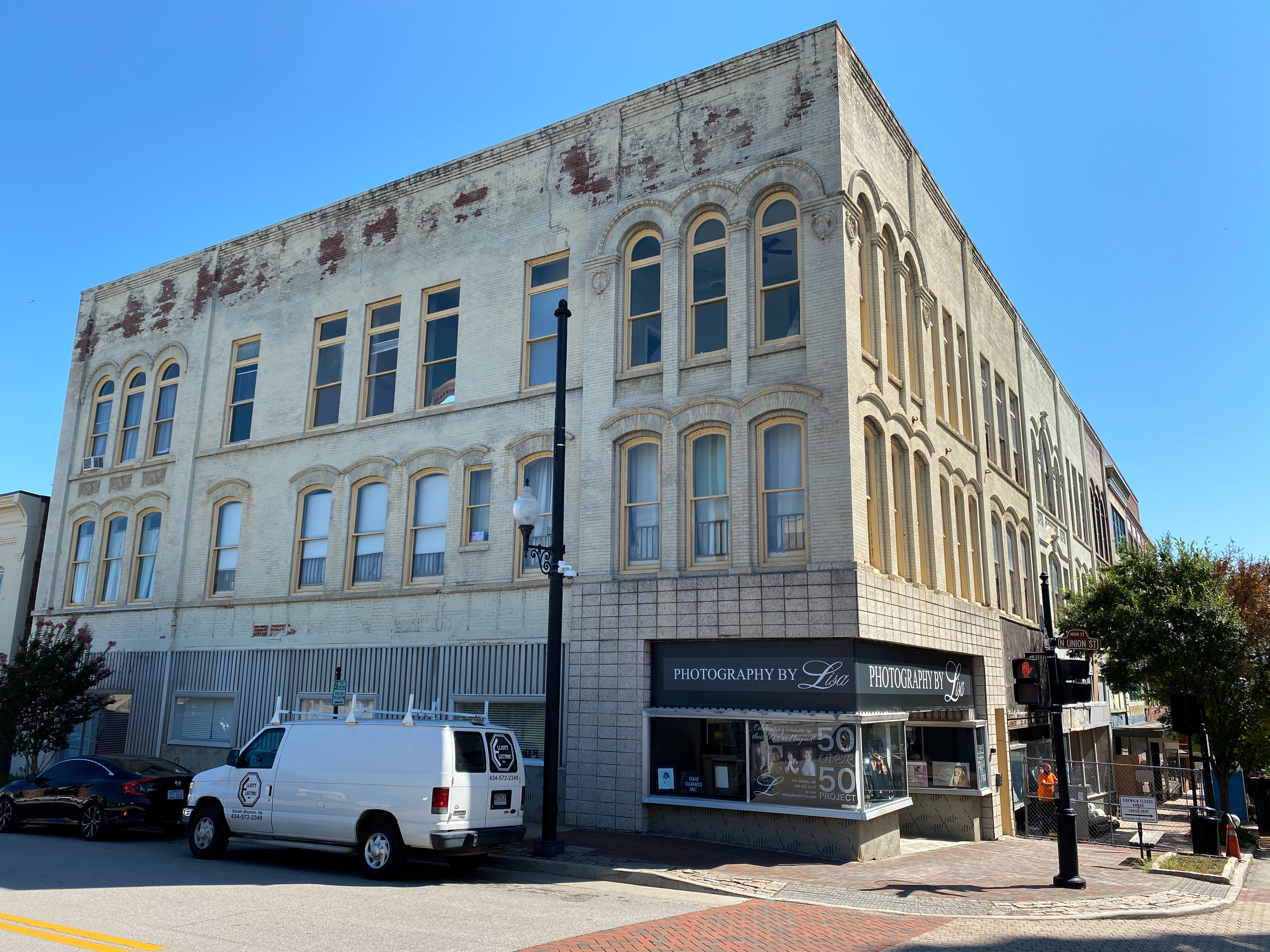
The livery stable and mixed retail block was built between 1904 and 1910 with Italianate arched parapet over the entrance to the former stable and another set of Baroque parapets.

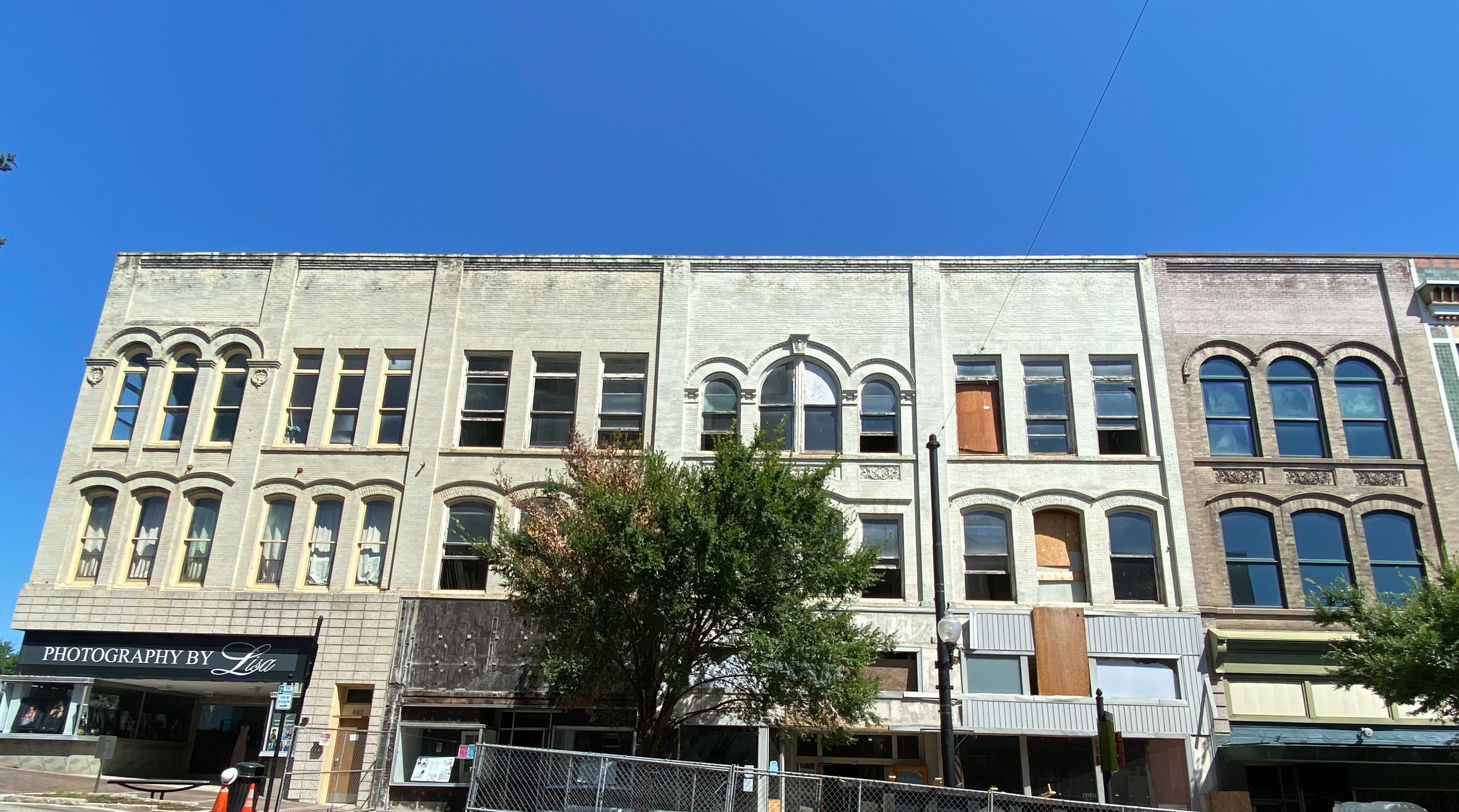
The 1901 Romanesque Revival Dudley Building once had a turret inspired by the chimney stacks of Chambord.
