= Hotel Danville =

Historic hotel in Virginia, US

- U.S. National Register of Historic Places
- U.S. Historic district – Contributing property
- Virginia Landmarks Register
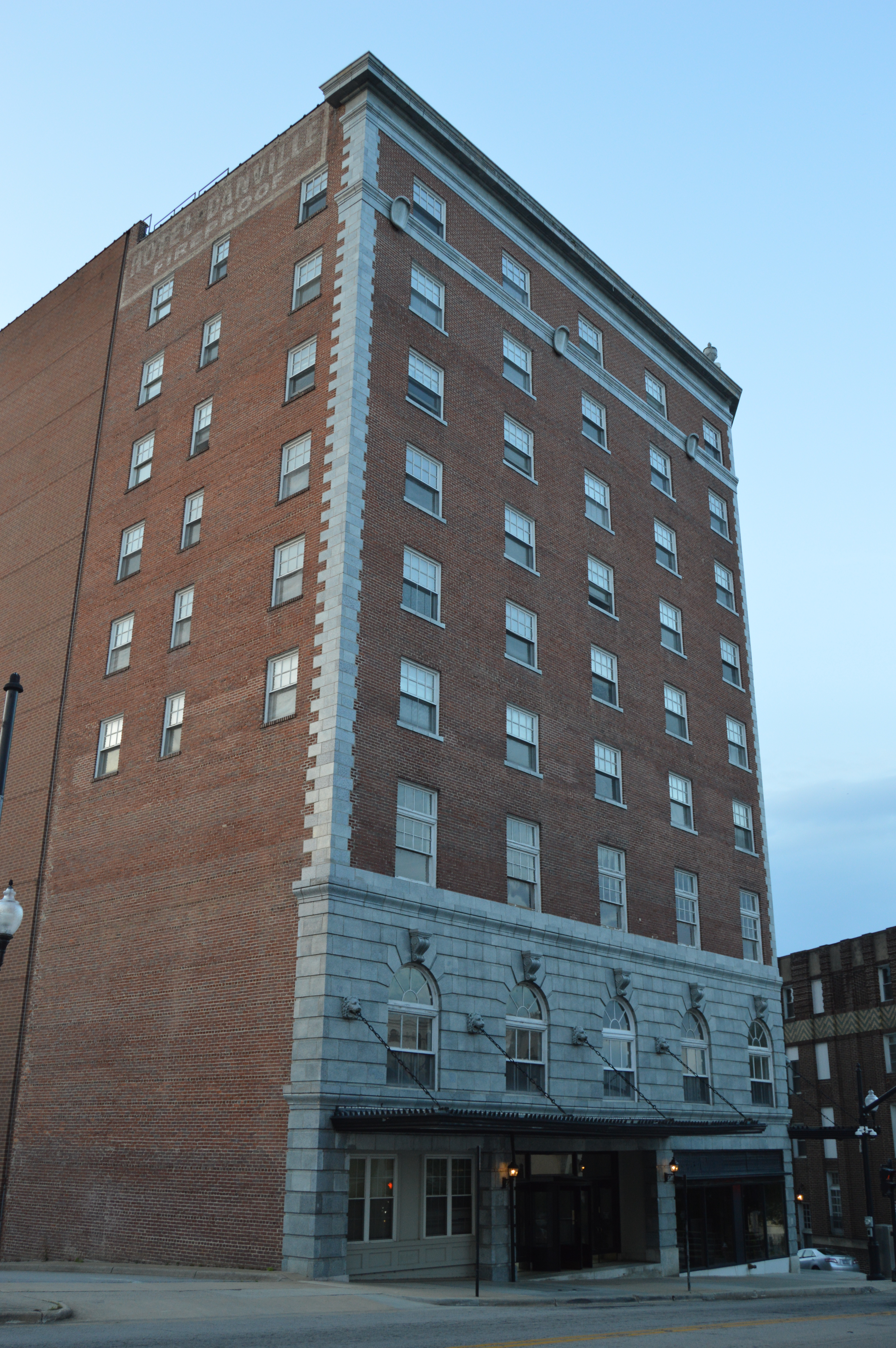
- Front, seen from the south

- Location within Virginia Location within the United States
- Location: 600 Main St., Danville, Virginia
- Coordinates: 36°35′13″N 79°23′41″W
- Area: 1.2 acres (0.49 ha)
- Built: 1890, 1927-1928
- Architect: H.A. Underwood, William H. Poindexter
- Architectural style: Colonial Revival, Neo-Adamesque
- NRHP reference No.: 84000658
- VLR No.: 108-0027

Significant dates
- Added to NRHP: December 6, 1984
- Designated VLR: October 16, 1984

Hotel Danville, also known as the Municipal Building and City Market, is a historic hotel building located at Danville, Virginia.

== History ==
The main section was built in 1927–1928, and consists of a ten-story, brick main section with two smaller axes to form a "V"-shape. The building is in the Neo-Adamesque style. The building once included the Capitol Theater, and incorporated a three-story rectangular hipped roof wing, or annex, that was the former Municipal Building and City Market complex. The building provides senior housing, known as Danville House.

It was listed on the National Register of Historic Places in 1984. It is located in the Downtown Danville Historic District.
