= Main Street Methodist Episcopal Church South =

Historic church in Virginia, US

- Main Street Methodist Church
- U.S. National Register of Historic Places
- Virginia Landmarks Register
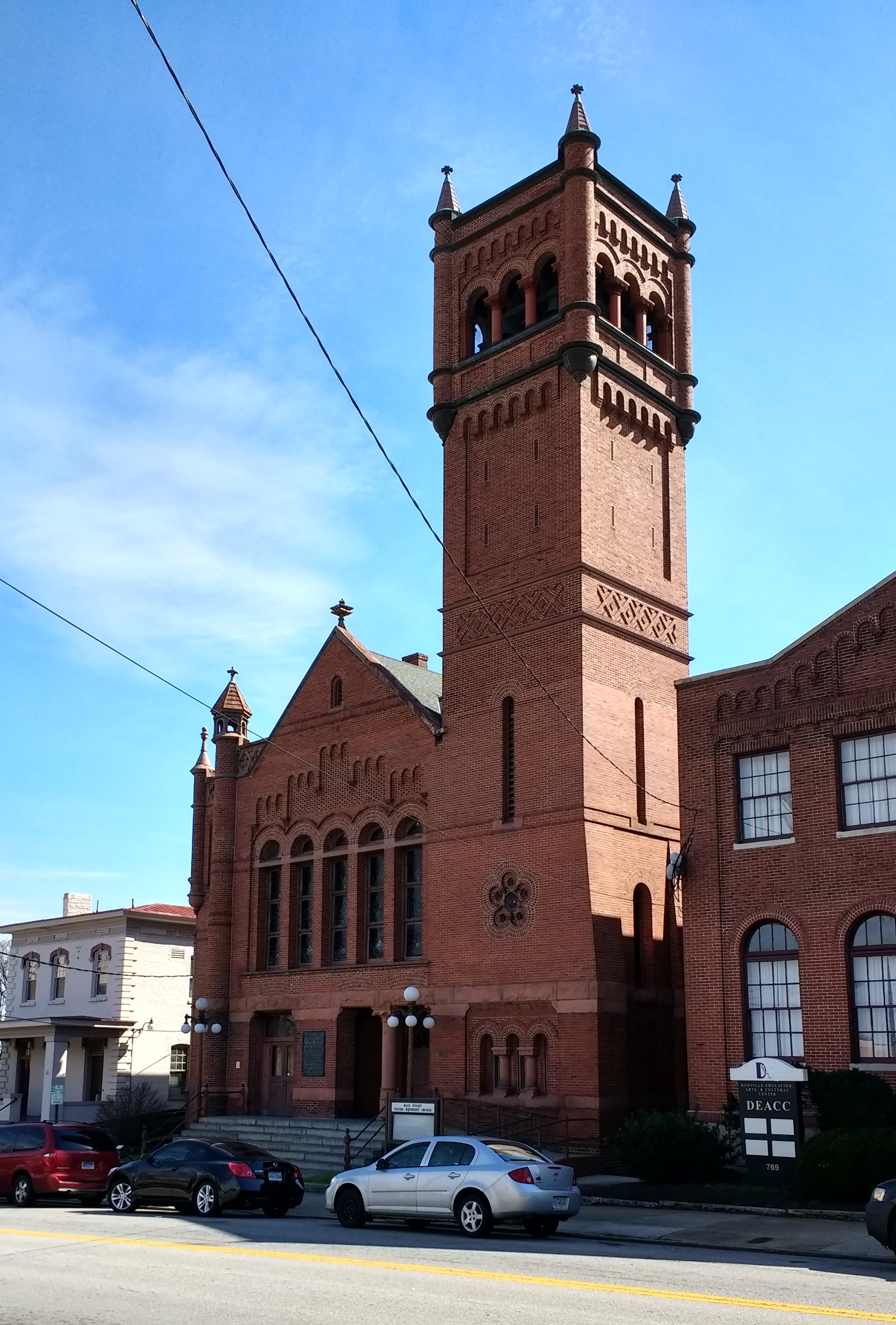

- Location within Virginia Location within the United States
- Location: 767 Main St., Danville, Virginia
- Coordinates: 36.5848°N 79.3964°W
- Area: 2 acres (0.81 ha)
- Built: 1865-1873, 1890-1891, 1923
- Architect: Heard, J. Bryant; Et al.
- Architectural style: Romanesque Revival
- NRHP reference No.: 90001822
- VLR No.: 108-0063

Significant dates
- Added to NRHP: December 6, 1990
- Designated VLR: October 16, 1990

Main Street Methodist Church, also known as the Main Street United Methodist Church, is a historic Methodist church located at Danville, Virginia. It was built between 1865 and 1873, and is a scored stucco over brick, Romanesque Revival style porch. It features an elaborate 87 feet (27 m) tall, corner bell tower that dates from an 1890-1891 church enlargement and remodeling. A complementary flanking educational building was added in 1923. It is known locally as the "Mother Church of Methodism in Danville."

The former Main Street United Methodist Church is the only Danville house of worship included on the National Register of Historic Places. It was listed on the National Register of Historic Places in 1990.

Donated by the Methodists to the nonprofit Danville Preservation League in 2008, its upkeep became too large a burden for the nonprofit. This structure has been in the private hands of William & Tania Hardin since 2016 who have taken on the responsibility of caring for the oldest standing church building in Danville. It held the offices and archives of Danville's Historic Society prior to their relocation in April 2019. It is now available to rent for events.
