= Danville Municipal Building =

- U.S. National Register of Historic Places
- U.S. Historic district – Contributing property
- Virginia Landmarks Register
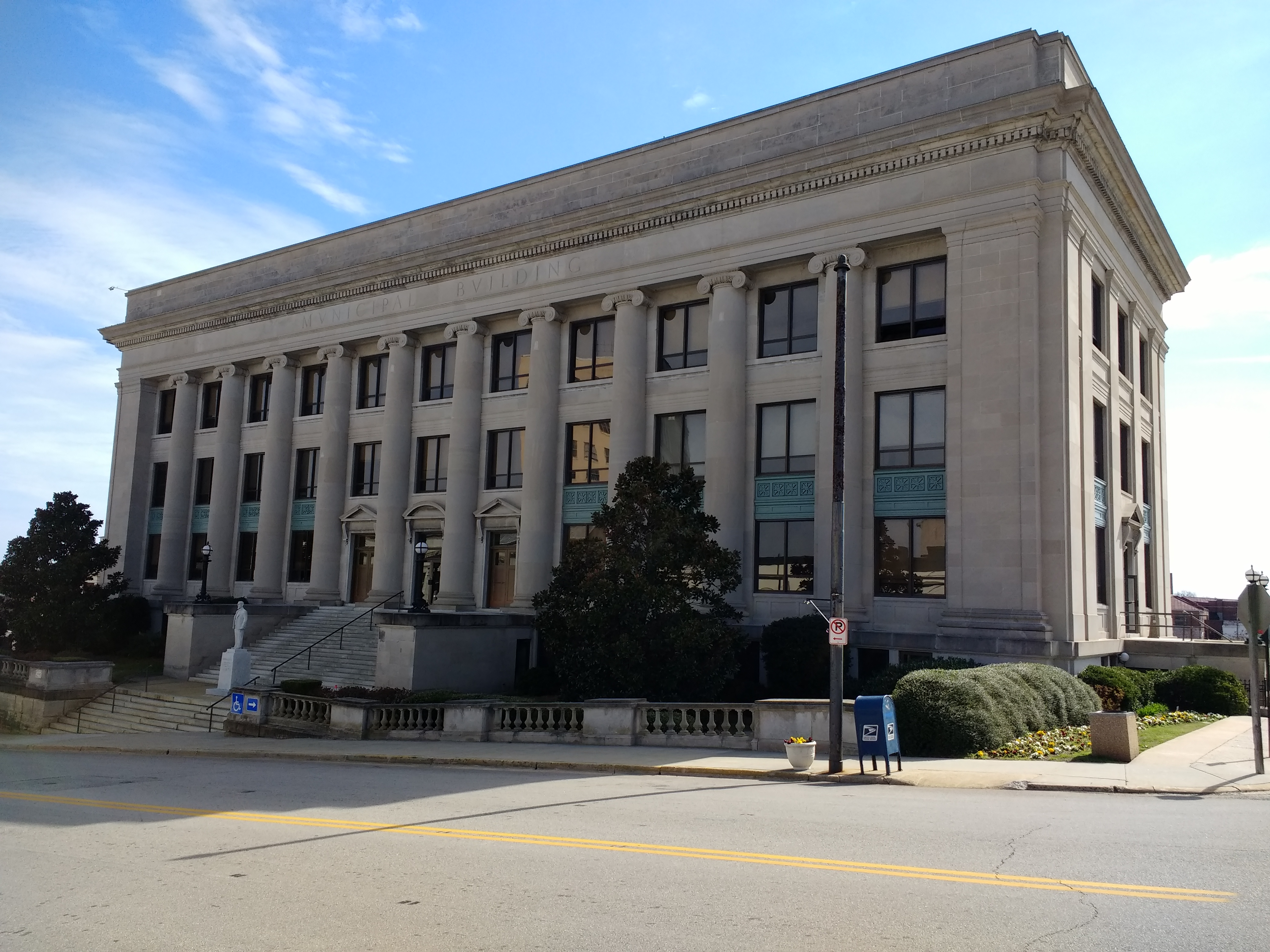

- Location within Virginia Location within the United States
- Location: 418 Patton St., Danville, Virginia
- Coordinates: 36°35′10″N 79°23′31″W
- Area: 1.3 acres (0.53 ha)
- Built: 1926
- Built by: Fuqua Construction Co.
- Architect: Heard and Chesterman
- Architectural style: Classical Revival
- NRHP reference No.: 95000896
- VLR No.: 108-0111-0071

Significant dates
- Added to NRHP: July 21, 1995
- Designated VLR: April 28, 1995

Danville Municipal Building is a historic city hall building located at Danville, Virginia, USA. It was built in 1926 and is a three-story, brick and concrete building faced in limestone in the Classical Revival style. Its front facade has a colonnade with Ionic order columns.

It was listed on the National Register of Historic Places in 1995. It is located in the Downtown Danville Historic District and Danville Tobacco Warehouse and Residential District.

== See also ==
- List of mayors of Danville, Virginia
