= Dan River Inc. Riverside Division Historic District =

Historic district in Virginia, United States

- Formerly listed on the U.S. National Register of Historic Places
- U.S. Historic district
- Virginia Landmarks Register
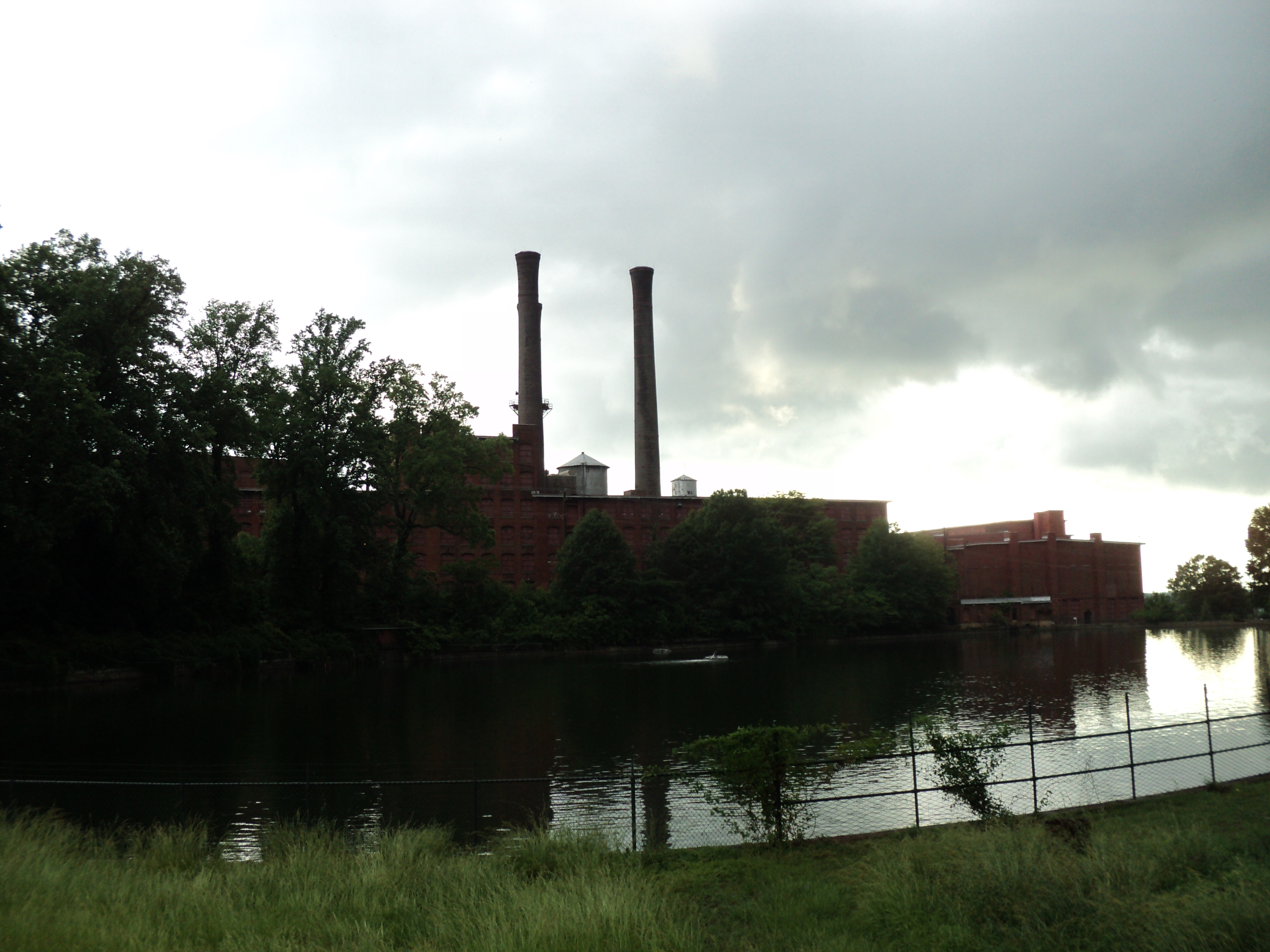
- Dan River Mills, May 2010

- Location within Virginia Location within the United States
- Location: Both sides of Dan River roughly bounded by Union St. Dam, Main St. Bridge, and Riverside and Memorial Drs., Danville, Virginia
- Coordinates: 36°35′31″N 79°23′32″W
- Area: 118.7 acres (48.0 ha)
- Built: 1882
- Built by: Aberthaw Construction Co.; Lockwood, Greene & Company
- Architectural style: Classical Revival, Gothic Revival
- NRHP reference No.: 00000480 (original); 10000095 (increase)
- VLR No.: 108-0013, 108-0123

Significant dates
- Added to NRHP: May 11, 2000
- Boundary increase: March 24, 2010
- Designated VLR: July 20, 1999, September 17, 2009
- Removed from NRHP: July 29, 2016

Dan River Inc. Riverside Division Historic District and Dan River Mill No. 8 was a textile mill complex and later a national historic district located at Danville, Virginia.

== History ==
The Mills were founded by the Riverside Cotton Mills, which was later called Dan River Inc., in 1882. Most of the industrial buildings date from the 1880s through the 1910s. Rather than hiring local residents who were mostly black, the company exclusively recruited rural white workers. By 1993, the Mills employed 6,500 workers. Layoffs began in 1995, and most jobs were gone by 2001. The complex was listed on the National Register of Historic Places in 2000. In 2006, Dalmia Group Gujarat Heavy Chemicals Limited purchased the company and closed the facility, moving all remaining production overseas. The historic district had a boundary increase in 2010 but it was delisted in 2016 after the site was partially cleared.

== Architecture ==
The district included 23 contributing buildings and 13 contributing structures in the city of Danville. The district included buildings and structures associated with the Riverside Division, one of two historic textile mill complexes in Danville. The building and structures are characterized by multistory industrial buildings of mostly brick construction. Dan River Mill No. 8 is a four-story, reinforced concrete building constructed in the 1920s. The Riverside Division of the company, site of the former Riverside Cotton Mills was constructed by its long time president and founder T.B. Fitzgerald.

== See also ==
- Schoolfield School Complex
- Schoolfield Welfare Building
- National Register of Historic Places listings in Danville, Virginia
