= Women's suffrage in Virginia =

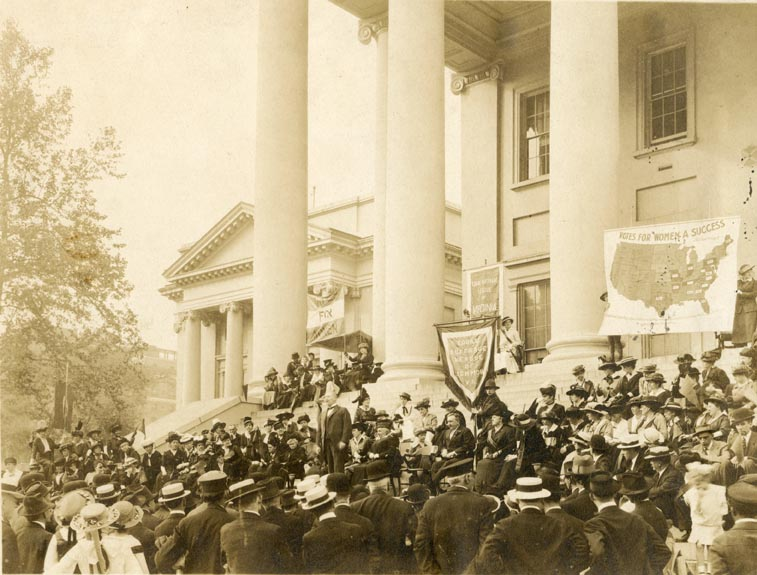
Women's suffrage rally at the Virginia State Capitol in 1916

Women's suffrage was granted in Virginia in 1920, with the ratification of the Nineteenth Amendment to the United States Constitution. The General Assembly, the state's governing legislative body, did not ratify the Nineteenth Amendment until 1952. The argument for women's suffrage in Virginia began in 1870, but it did not gain traction until 1909 with the founding of the Equal Suffrage League of Virginia. Between 1912 and 1916, Virginia's suffragists would bring the issue of women's voting rights to the floor of the General Assembly three times, petitioning for an amendment to the state constitution giving women the right to vote; they were defeated each time. During this period, the Equal Suffrage League of Virginia and its fellow Virginia suffragists fought against a strong anti-suffragist movement that tapped into conservative, post-Civil War values on the role of women, as well as racial fears. After achieving suffrage in August 1920, over 13,000 women registered within one month to vote for the first time in the 1920 United States presidential election.

== Early efforts ==
Organizing for women's suffrage began in Virginia in 1870, when Anna Whitehead Bodeker, originally from New Jersey, invited suffragist Pauline Kellogg Wright Davis to speak in Richmond. Bodeker and other supporters of women's suffrage created the Virginia State Woman Suffrage Association in May 1870.

During her time as president of the Virginia State Woman Suffrage Association, Bodeker tried to stir up public support of women's suffrage by contributing to local newspapers and inviting nationally known suffragists to speak in Richmond. Bodeker arranged to have Susan B. Anthony speak about suffrage in Richmond's federal courthouse in December 1870.

Citing the Fourteenth and Fifteenth Amendments to the U.S Constitution, Bodeker attempted to vote in a municipal election in Richmond in November 1871. She was unsuccessful. In place of a ballot, Bodeker put a note in the ballot box that read:

"By the Constitution of the United States, I Mrs. A. Whitehead Bodeker, have a right to give my vote at this election, and in vindication of it drop this note in the ballot-box, November 7th, 1871."

Due to pressure for women in post-Civil War Virginia to adhere to traditional values of womanhood, Bodeker was unable to attract significant support for the cause of women's suffrage. The Virginia State Woman's Suffrage Association faded from the women's suffragist movement less than a decade after its founding.

In 1880, Orra Henderson Moore Gray Langhorne unsuccessfully petitioned Virginia's General Assembly to allow women to vote in the presidential election. In 1894, Langhorne petitioned the General Assembly for female property owners to have the right to vote in state and national elections—also unsuccessfully.

Langhorne established the Virginia Suffrage Society (later called the Virginia Woman Suffrage Association) in 1893, as part of the National American Woman Suffrage Association (NAWSA). She served as the society's president, as vice-president of NAWSA, and testified with other NAWSA suffragist at a 1896 United States Senate committee hearing on women's rights. However, due to low membership numbers and organizational challenges, the Virginia Suffrage Society closed before the turn of the century.

== Equal Suffrage League of Virginia ==
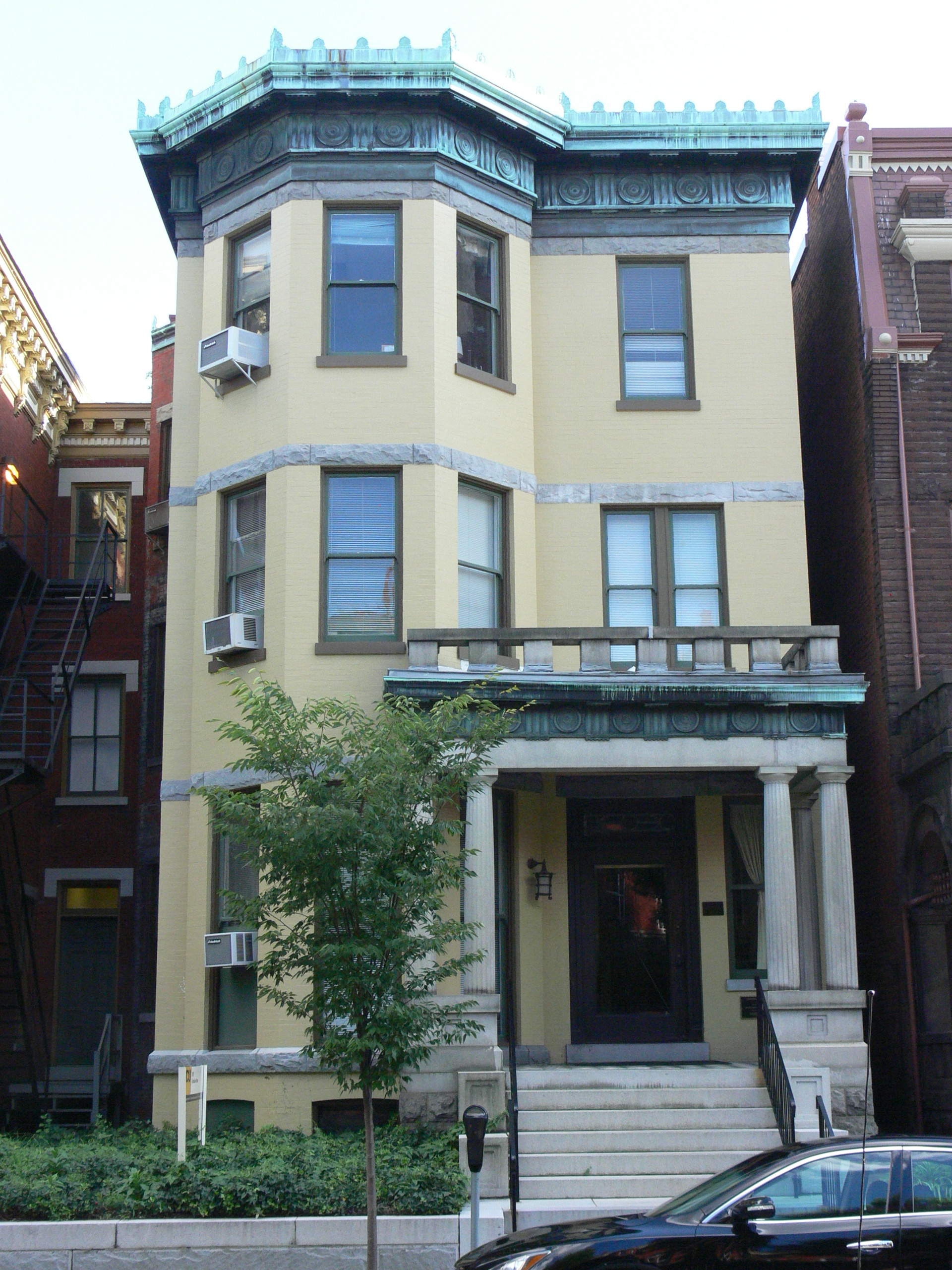
Crenshaw's home, the site of the first meetings of the Equal Suffrage League of Virginia

In November 1909, a group of about 20 activists formed the Equal Suffrage League of Virginia in Richmond. The first meetings took place at Anne Clay Crenshaw's home, located at 919 West Franklin Street, which is listed on the National Register of Historic Places.

Lila Meade Valentine served as the league's first president. Other founding members included Kate Waller Barrett, one of Virginia's first female physicians; artists Adele Goodman Clark and Nora Houston; and writers Kate Langley Bosher, Ellen Glasgow, and Mary Johnston. The league joined NAWSA a few months after its founding.

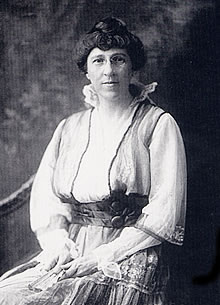
Lila Meade Valentine, co-founder and first president of the Equal Suffrage League of Virginia

While NAWSA favored organizing by electoral districts and putting pressure on politicians, the Equal Suffrage League of Virginia had to take different approach. Aware of the widespread apathy towards the issue of suffrage in Virginia, the league's leaders knew that educating the public on suffrage was the only way to give the cause legislative traction. The Equal Suffrage League focused their legislative efforts on winning support in the General Assembly for a voting rights amendment to the state constitution.

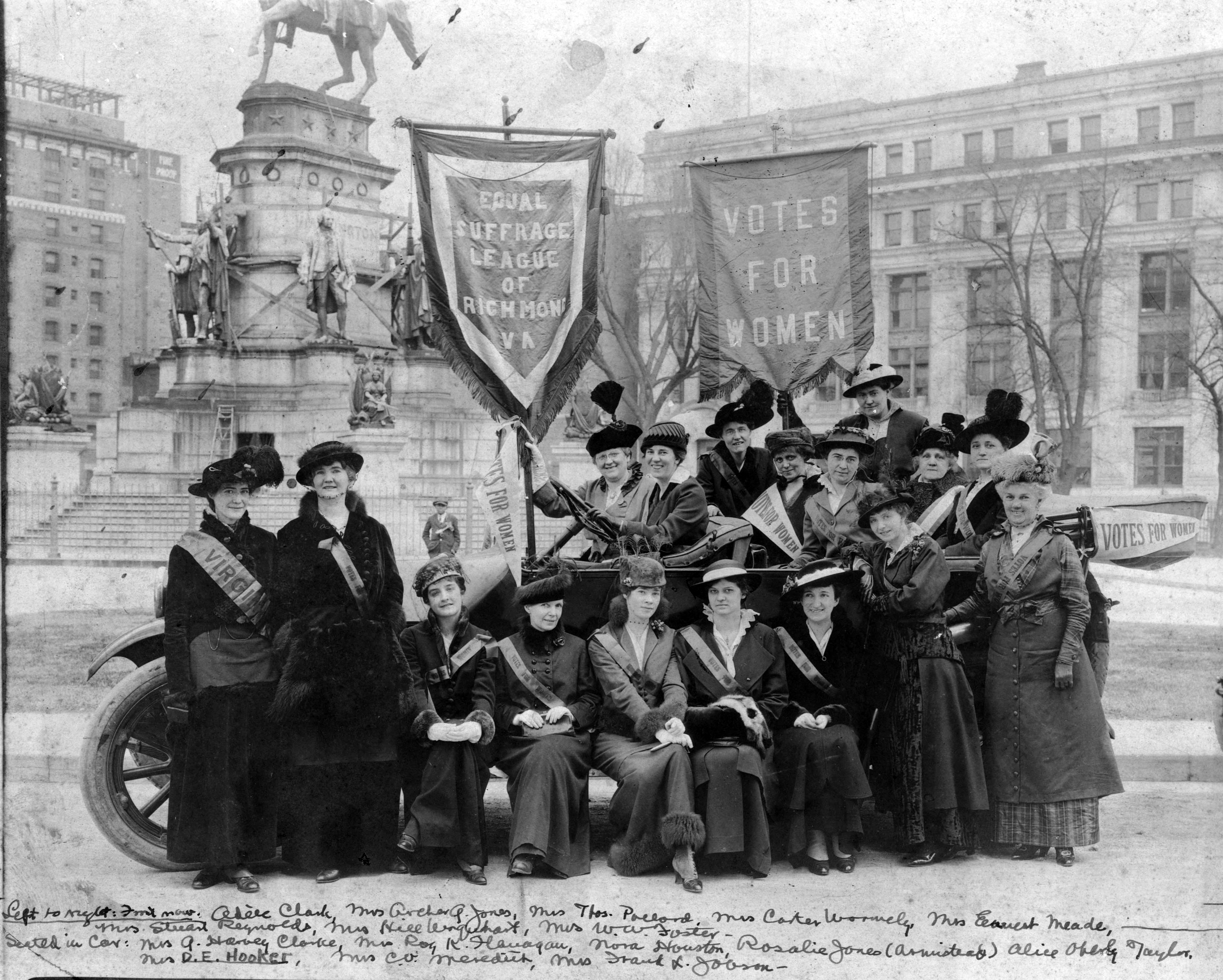
Equal Suffrage League of Virginia in front of Washington Monument, Capitol Square, Richmond, February 1915

The Equal Suffrage League of Virginia began educating the public about suffrage and drawing more women into the cause. Members canvassed house to house; distributed leaflets and "Votes for Women" buttons; and made speeches across the state. The league began publishing Virginia Suffrage News in 1914.

The Equal Suffrage League of Virginia's membership grew from about 100 members in its first year to more than 15,000 by 1917. By 1919, with 32,000 members, it was the largest political organization in the state of Virginia, and perhaps the largest state association in the South.

Meanwhile, some Virginia suffragists grew impatient with the painstaking process of petitioning the General Assembly for a women's suffrage amendment to the state constitution and educating the public on the value of giving women the vote. Some women left their local chapters of the Equal Suffrage League of Virginia to join the more militant National Women's Party, joining efforts in pressuring the United States Congress and President Woodrow Wilson for a federal amendment giving women the right to vote.

== Anti-suffragism in Virginia ==
=== The role of women in society ===
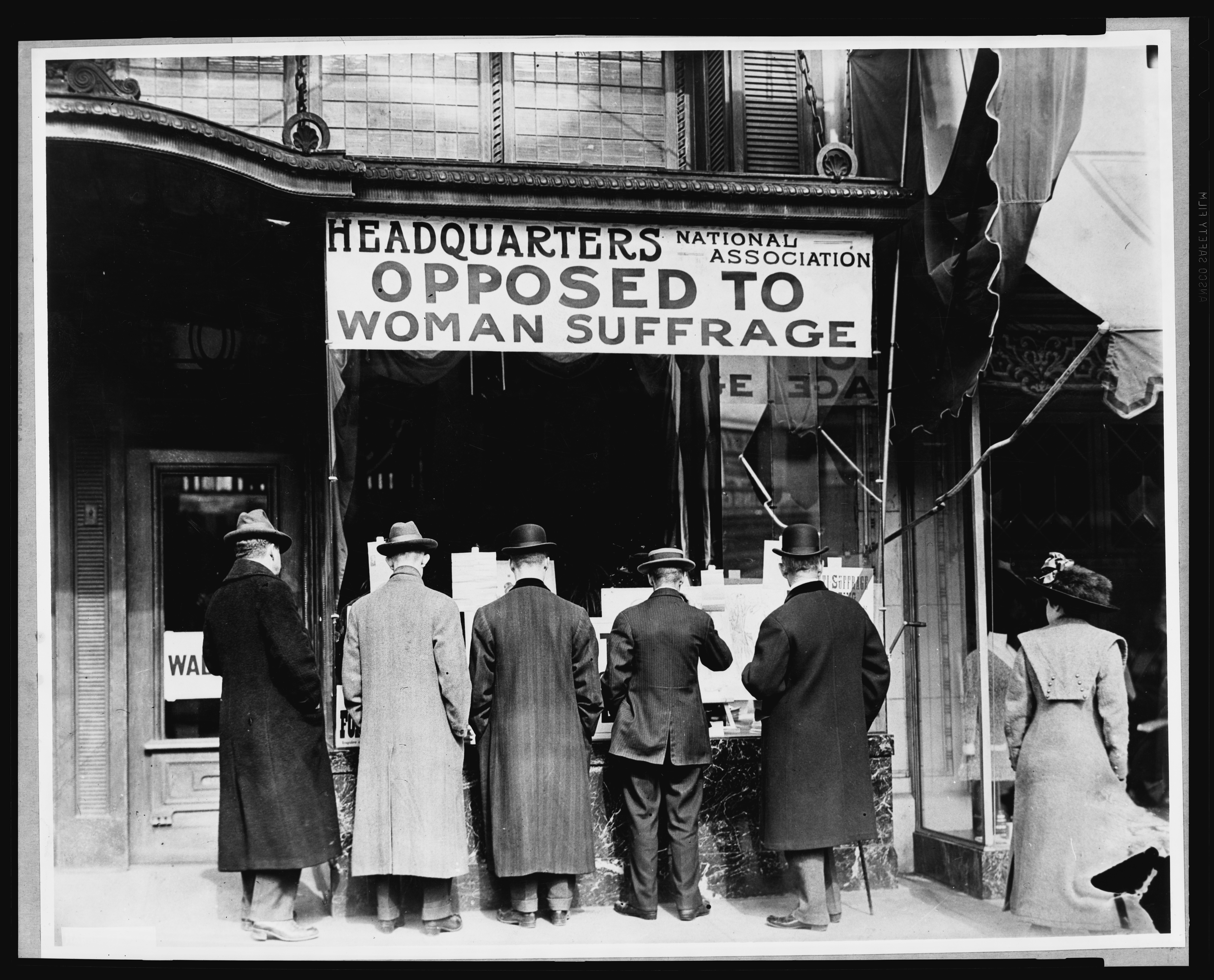
Headquarters of the National Association Opposed to Woman Suffrage (NAOWS) in New York City. Virginia's branch of NAOWS formed in 1912.

In 1912, the Virginia Association Opposed to Women's Suffrage (VAOWS) was formed in affiliation with the National Association Opposed to Woman Suffrage. Jane Rutherford served as president. The VAOWS began distributing anti-suffragist pamphlets claiming that, due to biological differences between the sexes, women were "easily excitable and impractical"; unable "to engage in political strife without calm minds"; and not "disposed to bother their heads with the actual facts of politics." The Equal Suffrage League of Virginia responded to these claims by arguing that Virginia women were intelligent, sensible citizens, and taxpayers with interests ignored by male legislators of the time—education, health care, and child labor, specifically. In its early years, the league appealed to conservative views on a woman's traditional role as wife and mother, insisting that in order to be a good mother, a woman had to be a good citizen. A flier issued by the NAWSA and reprinted by the Equal Suffrage League of Virginia proclaimed that "the place of the woman is in the HOME" and "Women are, by nature and training, housekeepers...Let them have a hand in the city's housekeeping, even if they introduce the occasional house-cleaning."

=== The issue of race ===
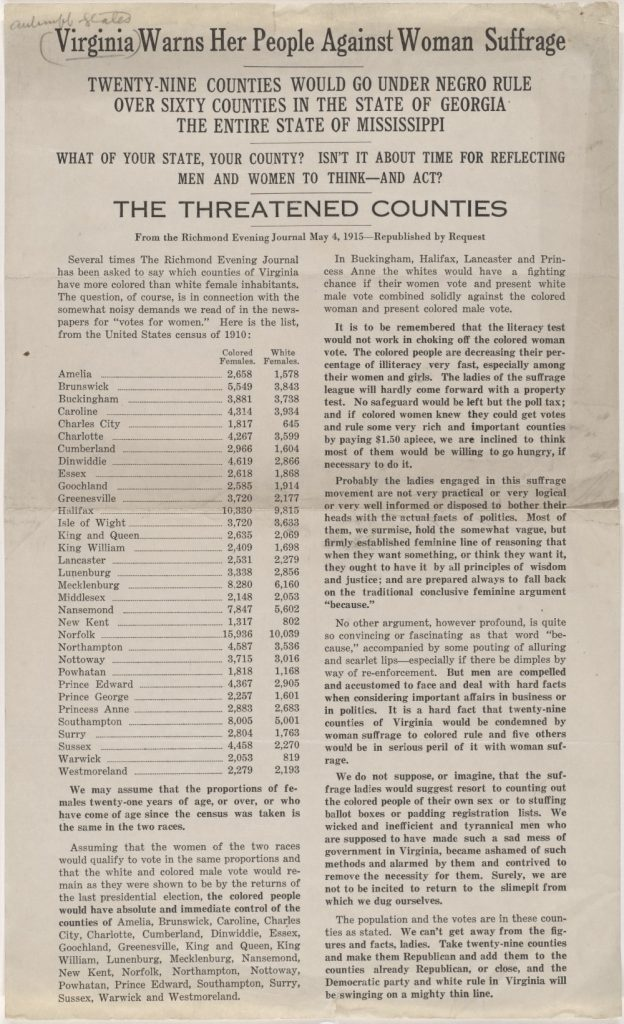
"Virginia Warns Her People Against Woman Suffrage" 1915 anti-suffrage flier

By 1915, anti-suffragists in Virginia were openly tapping into racial fears. They warned that giving women the right to vote would also give African American women the right to vote, leading to blacks taking control of the polls and putting white supremacy in danger. A flier distributed by the VAOWS claimed that if both black men and women had the right to vote, then "Twenty-nine Counties Would Go Under Negro Rule." At first, Virginia suffragists publicly ignored this element of the anti-suffragist argument. However, private exchanges within the Virginia suffrage movement showed differing views on the issue of giving African American women the right to vote. In a letter to Lila Meade Valentine, Mary Johnston wrote, "I think that as women we should be most prayerfully careful lest, in the future, women—whether coloured women or white women who are merely poor—should be able to say that we had betrayed their interests and excluded them from freedom." Meanwhile, Valentine wrote to a friend, "I believe that all women, white or black, who meet the qualifications for suffrage in any State should have that right, but in working to secure that right, we should exercise common sense, and not complicate our efforts and add difficulties of the task by injecting elements of discord. As you know, the negro is the one remaining argument against suffrage in the Southern States . . . This is not a matter of principle but of expediency." In 1916, the Equal Suffrage League of Virginia distributed "Equal Suffrage and the Negro Vote," a pamphlet arguing that "the enfranchisement of Virginia women would increase white supremacy" and assured readers that literacy tests and poll taxes would prove effective in disenfranchising African Americans.

== Legislative challenges ==
Between 1912 and 1916, Virginia's suffragists brought the issue of women's voting rights to the floor of the General Assembly on three separate occasions; they were defeated each time. After the United States Congress passed the Nineteenth Amendment in June 1919, the Equal Suffrage League of Virginia fought for ratification, but Virginia's politicians refused. On February 6, 1920, the Senate of Virginia rejected the amendment, 24 to 10; on February 12, 1920, it failed in the House of Delegates, 62 to 22.

== After suffrage ==
=== New organizations, continued race disparities, and the rush to register ===
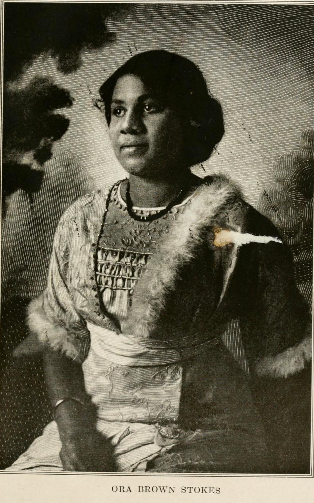
Ora Brown Stokes Perry, first president of Virginia Negro Women's League of Voters

Virginian women won the right to vote in August 1920 when the Nineteenth Amendment became law and would go on to vote in the presidential election that following November. The Equal Suffrage League of Virginia disbanded a few weeks later and reorganized as the League of Women Voters of Virginia, which would focus on educating women on how to register to vote and pay the poll tax. Members also participated in lobbying efforts for social welfare issues. Adele Goodman Clark, an original member of the Equal Suffrage League of Virginia, chaired the committee to establish the organization and served as its president from 1921 to 1925; she served a second term from 1929 to 1944.

Black leaders in Richmond organized voter registration drives and voter education efforts. Maggie L. Walker, an African American businesswoman and the first woman in the United States to establish and serve as president of a bank, chaired a committee of female activists that held mass meetings to encourage black women to vote.

Virginia women were only given one month to register to vote before the November 1920 presidential election, and registrars were not prepared for the large number of women voters. Three white women were hired to process white women's voter registrations; black women were left to stand in long lines as they waited to be registered. Walker went to City Hall and demanded the hiring of more officials to speed up the registration process. Ora Brown Stokes Perry, an African American social worker, unsuccessfully petitioned the registrar of voters to appoint African American deputies to register black women to vote, but none were appointed.

Shut out from membership in the newly established Virginia League of Women Voters, African American women established their own organization: the Virginia Negro Women's League of Voters; Perry served as president.

By early October, 13,000 women—10,645 white and 2,410 black—had registered to vote.

== Women's early participation in Virginia politics (1920 until state ratification) ==
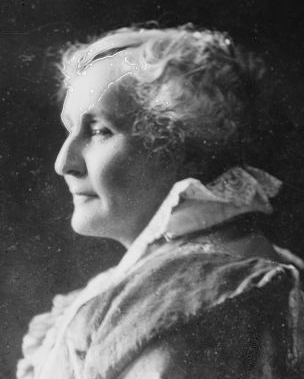
Kate Waller Barrett, female delegate to the 1924 Democratic National Convention

In 1920, Mary-Cooke Branch Munford, a Richmond community activist and social reformer from was appointed to the Democratic National Committee.

In 1923, Sarah Lee Fain and Helen Timmons Henderson become the first women elected to the Virginia's General Assembly; they took office in January 1924.

Equal Suffrage League of Virginia co-founder Kate Waller Barrett served as delegate from Virginia to the 1924 Democratic National Convention.

Between 1923 and 1933, six women—all teachers or educators and all Democrats, the state's majority party at the time—ran successfully for the Virginia House of Delegates. In addition to Fain and Henderson, other female delegates during this time included: Sallie Cook Booker, Nancy Melvinna Caldwell, Helen Ruth Henderson, and Emma Lee White.

No women served in Virginia's General Assembly between 1933 and 1954.

In June 1948, Clintwood, Virginia, elected its first female mayor, Minnie "Sis" Miller, and an all-female city council: Buena Smith, Ida Cunningham, Ferne W. Skeen, Kate Friend, and Marian C. Shortt. They took office on September 1, 1948.

The General Assembly of Virginia finally ratified the Nineteenth Amendment on February 21, 1952.

== See also ==
- Anti-suffragism (United States)
- African-American woman suffrage movement
- List of Virginia suffragists
- Timeline of women's suffrage in Virginia
- Timeline of women's suffrage in the United States
- Women's suffrage in the United States
- Women's suffrage in states of the United States
