= 1922 United States Senate election in Mississippi =

1922 U.S. Senate Democratic runoff in Mississippi
- September 5, 1922
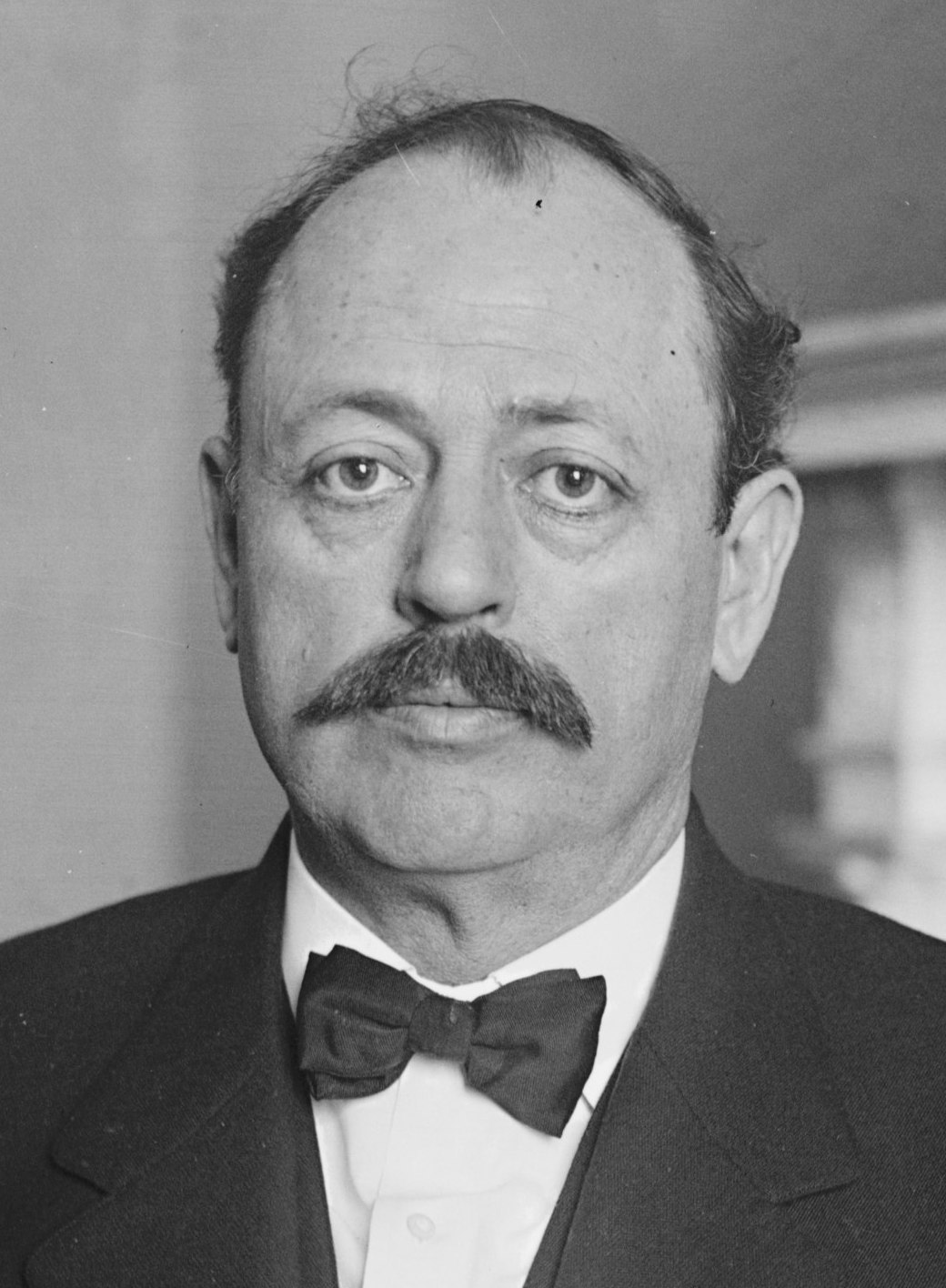

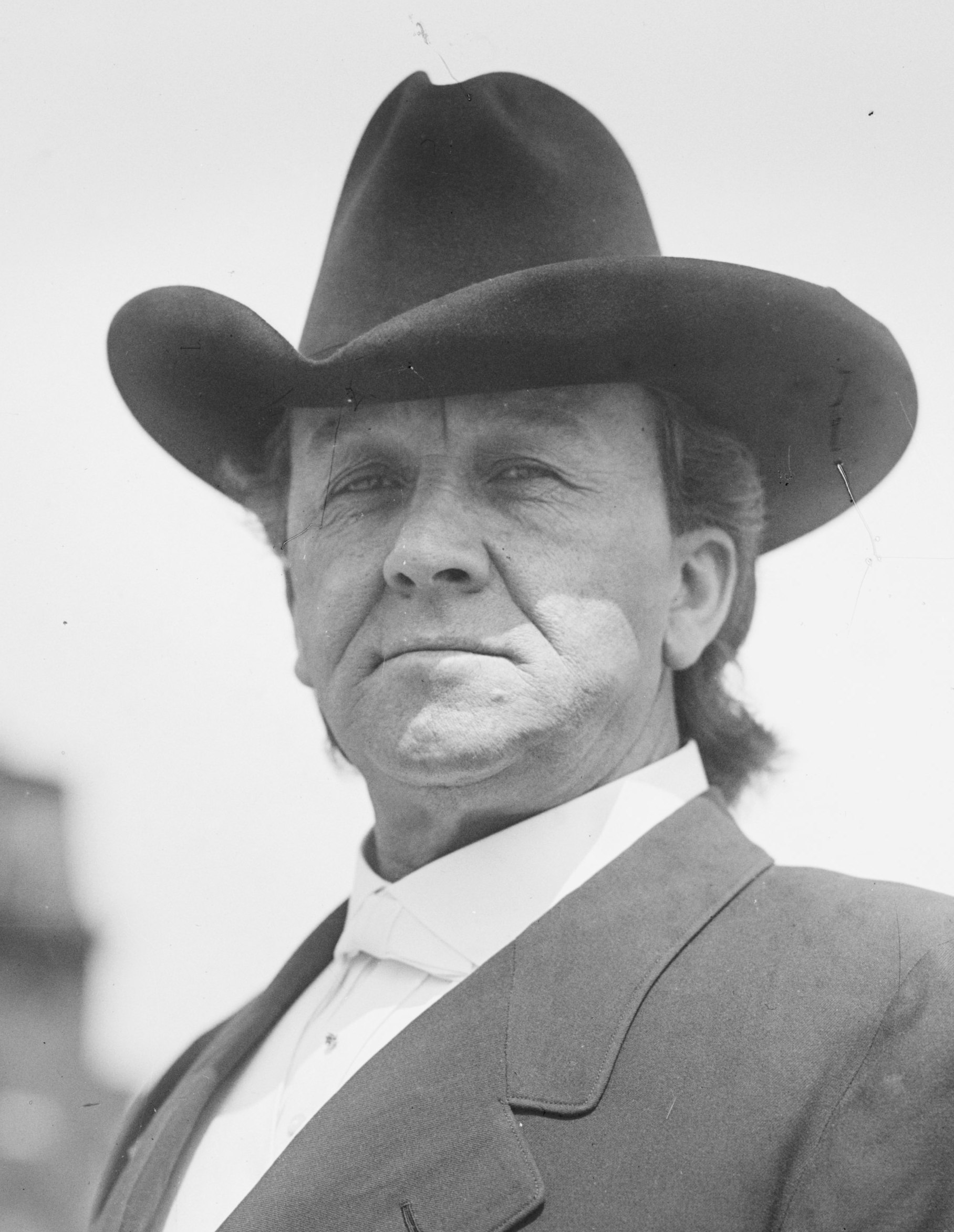
Nominee	Hubert D. Stephens	James K. Vardaman
Party	Democratic	Democratic
Popular vote	95,351	86,853
Percentage	52.33%	47.67%
U.S. senator before election
John Sharp Williams
Democratic
Elected U.S. Senator
Hubert D. Stephens
Democratic

The 1922 United States Senate election in Mississippi was held on November 7, 1922. Incumbent Democratic U.S. Senator John Sharp Williams did not run for re-election to a third term in office.

In the Democratic primary to succeed Williams, U.S. Representative Hubert D. Stephens defeated former Senator James K. Vardaman, who had held Mississippi's other Senate seat for one term. The race required a run-off, as neither candidate achieved a majority in the August primary with suffragette Belle Kearney in the race.

Stephens's victory in the September 5 run-off was tantamount to election; he faced only nominal opposition from the Republican and Socialist candidates in the November general election.

== Democratic primary ==
=== Candidates ===
- Belle Kearney, suffragette and temperance lecturer
- Hubert D. Stephens, former U.S. representative from New Albany
- James K. Vardaman, former U.S. senator (1913–19) and governor (1904–08)

==== Declined ====
- Theodore G. Bilbo, former governor (1916–20)

Former senator James Vardaman joined the race in June. Former governor Theodore Bilbo intended to run but withdrew after his implication in the ongoing sex scandal surrounding Governor Lee M. Russell.

=== Campaign ===
Vardaman was condemned by former President Woodrow Wilson, who had engineered his defeat in 1918 over his opposition to American involvement in World War I. Wilson emphatically denounced Vardaman in a single sentence, stating, "I think he is thoroughly false and untrustworthy and that it would be a great detriment to Mississippi and the nation if he should be returned to the Senate." Vardaman responded with a lengthy statement attributing Wilson's opposition to their long-standing enmity.

Belle Kearney, among the first women to run for Senate anywhere in the country, encountered opposition from both men and women. One politician was quoted as saying, "When I cast my ballot for a woman, you can rest assured she is going to be a good-looking one and not so damn old as Miss Belle." Other former suffragettes privately withheld support based on past experience with Kearney. Nellie Nugent Somerville told a friend that Kearney "would never get [her] vote" because she had "worried and hindered legislative work." Nevertheless, she received a rare endorsement from the state League of Women Voters.

=== Results ===
1922 Democratic U.S. Senate primary
Party	Candidate	Votes	%
Democratic	James K. Vardaman	74,597	46.95%
Democratic	Hubert D. Stephens	65,980	41.53%
Democratic	Belle Kearney	18,303	11.52%
Total votes		158,880	100.00%

=== Runoff ===
In the run-off, held September 5, both candidates vied for Kearney's primary voters, many of whom were women voting in a primary for the first time. Ultimately, Kearney threw her support behind Stephens, and her voters were credited with defeating the Vardaman machine in Mississippi.

1922 Democratic U.S. Senate runoff
Party	Candidate	Votes	%
Democratic	Hubert D. Stephens	95,351	52.33%
Democratic	James K. Vardaman	86,853	47.67%
Total votes		182,204	100.00%

== General election ==
=== Results ===
1922 U.S. Senate election in Mississippi
Party	Candidate	Votes	%	±%
Democratic	Hubert D. Stephens	63,636	93.21%	▼6.79
Republican	John H. Cook	3,362	4.92%	N/A
Socialist	Hubert D. Stephens	1,273	1.87%	N/A
Total votes		68,271	100.00%	

Map of the final results, shaded accordingly

== See also ==
- 1922 United States Senate elections
