= Senator Kearney =

Senator Kearney may refer to:

- Belle Kearney (1863–1939), Mississippi State Senate
- Eric Kearney (born 1963), Ohio State Senate
- Tim Kearney (politician) (born 1960), Pennsylvania State Senate
