= Lenoir Chambers =

American journalist (1891–1970)

Joseph Lenoir Chambers
- Born: December 26, 1891; Charlotte, North Carolina
- Died: January 10, 1970 (aged 78)
- Education: A.B, University of North Carolina; Columbia School of Journalism, New York
- Occupations: Journalist; Author; Historian
- Employer: The Virginian-Pilot
- Title: Editor
- Spouse: Roberta Burwell Strudwick
- Children: 1
- Parent(s): Joseph Lenoir Chambers Senior, Grace Singleton Dewey
- Awards: 1960 Pulitzer prize for editorial writing

Joseph Lenoir Chambers (December 26, 1891 – January 10, 1970) was an American writer, biographer, historian, and Pulitzer prize-winning newspaper editor. He served in the American Expeditionary Forces, and briefly commanded a combat company, during World War I.

In 1960, as editor of The Virginian-Pilot of Norfolk, Virginia (now owned by Tribune Publishing), he won the Pulitzer for Editorial Writing, for his series of editorials in favor of school desegregation, especially in Virginia. A native of Charlotte, North Carolina, he was elected to the North Carolina Journalism Hall of Fame in 1991.

Author Alex Liedholdt published a book on Chambers, Standing Before the Shouting Mob: Lenoir Chambers and Virginia's Massive Resistance to Public School Integration, in 2008.

== Background and education ==
Joseph Lenoir Chambers was born in Charlotte, North Carolina, on December 26, 1891, to father, Joseph Lenoir Chambers Sr., and mother Grace Singleton Dewey Chambers. He attended Woodberry Forest preparatory school, graduating in 1910.

Chambers was a scholar who also played varsity sports and edited the campus newspaper, while attending the University of North Carolina. He was a member of the Phi Beta Kappa fraternity and received his A.B. in 1914. After graduation, he taught English at Woodberry for two years, until 1916, before enrolling at the Columbia School of Journalism, in New York; he graduated in 1917.

In 1960, he was awarded an honorary Legume Doctorate, from the University of North Carolina.

== Military service ==
His first, brief job, in journalism, was with the New-Republic news service, in Washington, before leaving to enlist in the military, during World War I.

Chambers served as 1st lieutenant, with the 52nd Infantry of the 6th Division, United States Army, and later at Division Headquarters, in the American Expeditionary Forces in France and Germany (1917–1919). He commanded a combat company in France, for a short time.

He met Cornelia (Nell) Battle Lewis, while she was part of the canteen service with the American Expeditionary Force, (1918–1919), and they had a brief romance, however, not long after returning to the states, the relationship ended.

== Career ==
On returning from his military service, Chambers served as the director of the University of North Carolina news bureau, until 1921; the position made him responsible for keeping the state's newspapers informed of the activities of the university. He also served as a reporter, city editor, and then associate editor for the Greensboro Daily News, in Greensboro, North Carolina. In 1929, he joined the Norfolk Virginian-Pilot, as associate editor, under Louis Isaac Jaffe. He married, Roberta Burwell Strudwick, the papers society editor, in 1928.

In 1944, Chambers became the editor of the papers afternoon edition, the Norfolk Ledger-Dispatch, and after the death of Louis Jaffe, he served as the editor of the Pilot, a difficult promotion for Chambers, saying he always thought of his new office as belonging to Jaffe. However, Chambers continued in the progressive tradition of his former mentor, pushing for five-years, for Virginia to comply, and integrate the state's public schools after the 1954 Brown v. Board of Education courts decision. James Lindsay Almond, governor, had closed the secondary schools a Massive resistance ploy, to avoid compliance.

In 1960, Chambers won the Pulitzer Prize for Editorial Writing, for "'his series of editorials on the school integration problem in Virginia," as exemplified by "The Year Virginia Closed the Schools", published January 1, 1959, and "The Year Virginia Opened the Schools", published December 31, 1959.

While working with the Pilot, Chambers also wrote his book, Stonewall Jackson, a two-volume biography of the Civil War general, published in 1959. After his retirement in 1960, he authored Salt Water & Printer's Ink: Norfolk and Its Newspapers (1967), a history of the newspaper industry in Norfolk.

== Civic engagement ==
Chambers was a member of the American Society of Newspaper Editors and the National Conference of Editorial Writers. He continued to stay involved in historical and civic activities, after retirement.

He was a trustee of Woodberry Forest, Norfolk Academy and the Norfolk Public Library, and was a member of the Virginia Historical Society. From 1966 until 1969, he served on the advisory committee to establish the New Market Battlefield Historical Park.

== Selected works ==
A collection of Chambers works and papers are held at the University of North Carolina, as part of The Southern Historical Collection at the Louis Round Wilson Special Collections Library. A selection of his works are listed below.

- The first year after war the war: being a recapitulation of the activities of the University of North Carolina during the year 1919, Chapel Hill University of North Carolina Press, 1920.
- Stonewall Jackson, Volume I, W. Morrow, 1959.
- Stonewall Jackson, Volume II, W. Morrow, 1959.
- Seven days I to the last march, Morrow, 1959.
- Excellence in a democracy, Golden Fleece, 1959.
- The South and the nation: at the 167th commencement exercises of the University of North Carolina, Kenan Stadium, Chapel Hill, June 5, 1961, University of Chapel Hill, 1961.
- Notes on life in occupied Norfolk, 1865, Virginia Historical Society, 1965.
- Salt water & printer's ink: Norfolk and it's newspapers, 1865–1965, co-author with Joseph E. Shank, Chapel Hill University of North Carolina Press, 1967.
- History as an avocation, Virginia Historical Society, 1968.
