= Pauline Adams =

Irish-American suffragist (1874–1957)

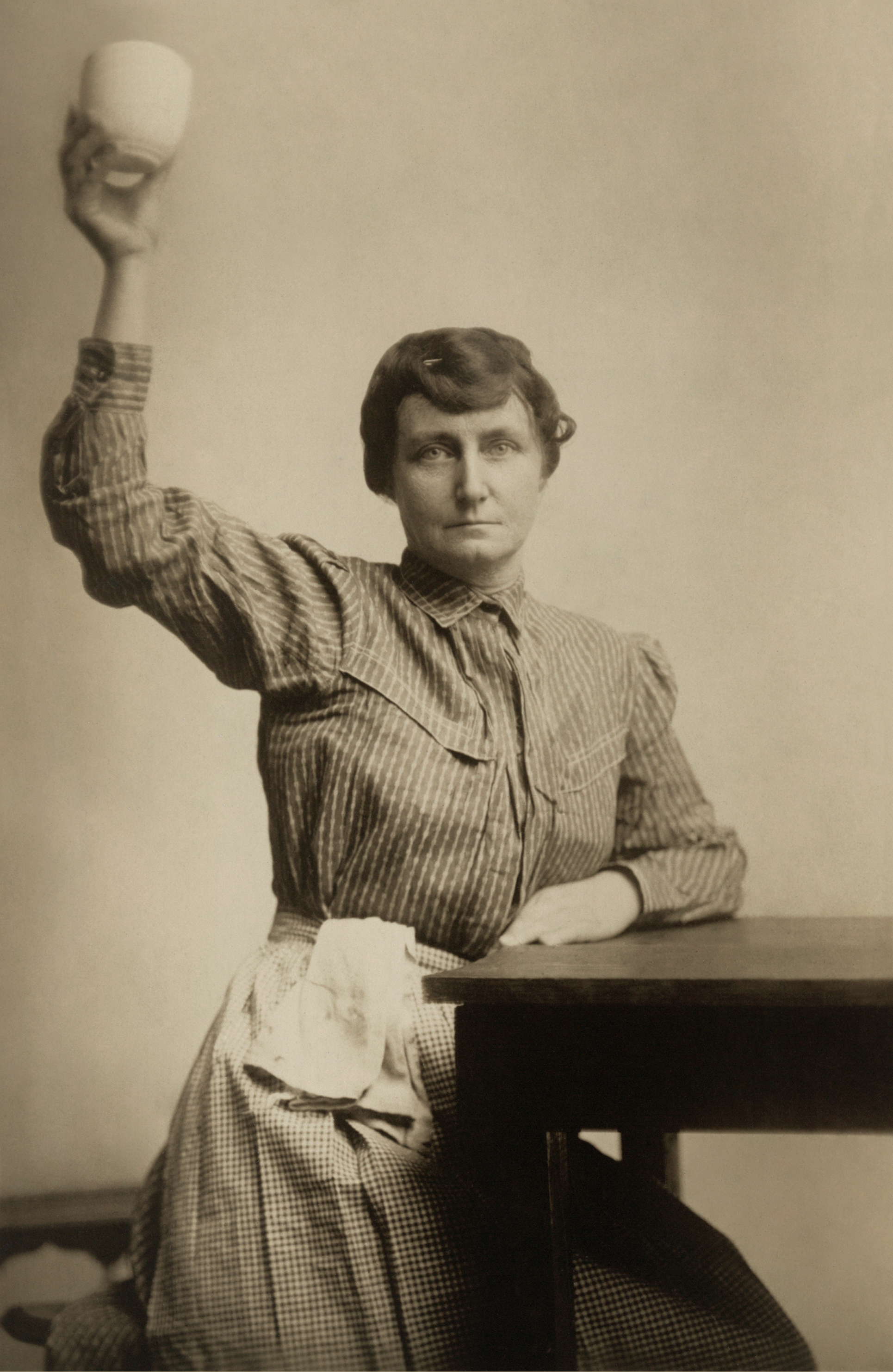
- Adams in prison uniform
- Born: Pauline Forstall Colclough; June 29, 1874; Dublin, Ireland
- Died: September 10, 1957 (aged 83); Norfolk, Virginia, U.S.
- Occupation: Lawyer
- Known for: Suffragist

Pauline Forstall Colclough Adams (June 29, 1874 – September 10, 1957) was an Irish American suffragist who took a militant approach to the campaign and then went to prison for her political beliefs.

== Early life ==
Pauline Forstall Colclough was born in Dublin, Ireland. She moved to the United States in 1898, living in Brunswick County, North Carolina, and later settling in Norfolk, Virginia. She married Norfolk physician Walter J. Adams; he established a medical practice and she gave birth to two sons.

The Norfolk Equal Suffrage League was organized during a meeting in her home on November 18, 1910. She was elected the first president of the Norfolk League and served two more terms before refusing to run again. Unlike many other American suffragists, she advocated a militant approach, shunning the chance to speak in an educational manner during President Woodrow Wilson's inauguration in Washington, D.C. Her militant stance prompted a rift in the Norfolk League and would earn her a reprimand from the state League headquarters in Richmond.

== Suffrage activities ==
In August 1913, she was one of 300 delegates to a suffrage conference in Washington, DC; she was one of three members from the state of Virginia.

She became president of Norfolk division of the Congressional Union for Woman Suffrage from 1917 to 1920. She and twelve other picketers were arrested 'for attempting to "flaunt their banners" in front of Woodrow Wilson's reviewing stand before a Selective Service parade on September 4, 1917.' They chose prison over a fine of 25 dollars and were sent to the workhouse at Occoquan, in Fairfax County, Virginia. Adams spent time in solitary confinement deprived of personal grooming items. The heated exchange between her and the judge was reported as follows:

Miss Pauline Adams, Norfolk, Va., had a spirited tile [tilt] with the judge. "I want to tell you," shouted Miss Adams, "that democracy will never be suppressed by prison walls."

"And I want to say to you," thundered Judge Pugh, "that suffrage never will be obtained as long as these methods of your's [sic] prevail."

"But the president has said — " said Miss Adams.

"But the courts say you can't", returned the judge.

"The president has said," shouted Miss Adams, "that I can picket and the president's word is higher than the courts."

"Twenty-five dollars or sixty days", replied the judge.

After she was released, she and nine others were treated to a dinner at Cameron House in Washington, D.C. A newspaper reports that the detainees were cut off from all contact with the outside world and were without books or writing material during their incarceration. They were released on November 4, 1917.

In December 1917, she and five other "pickets" filed an appeal with the decision of the Police Court, charging that their rights were 'flagrantly disregarded in the trial court and that they were not accorded a fair and impartial trial'. The appeal was successful. 'The court held the information against the suffragettes was too vague, general and uncertain to warrant a conviction.'

== Other activities ==
Adams was a proponent of the Esperanto language.

In 1913, she invented two popular suffrage games that were sold in Virginia and Maryland; the funds raised were used to support her suffrage work.

After passage of the Nineteenth Amendment in August 1920, she looked for new challenges. She passed the bar exam in 1921 and became the second woman to practice law in Norfolk. She was also involved in politics, working on the campaign of Sarah Lee Fain and running unsuccessfully for city council. She died of myocardial failure in 1957 and was buried in Elmwood Cemetery in Norfolk.
