= Elmwood Cemetery (Norfolk, Virginia) =

Historic cemetery in Virginia, United States

- U.S. National Register of Historic Places
- Virginia Landmarks Register
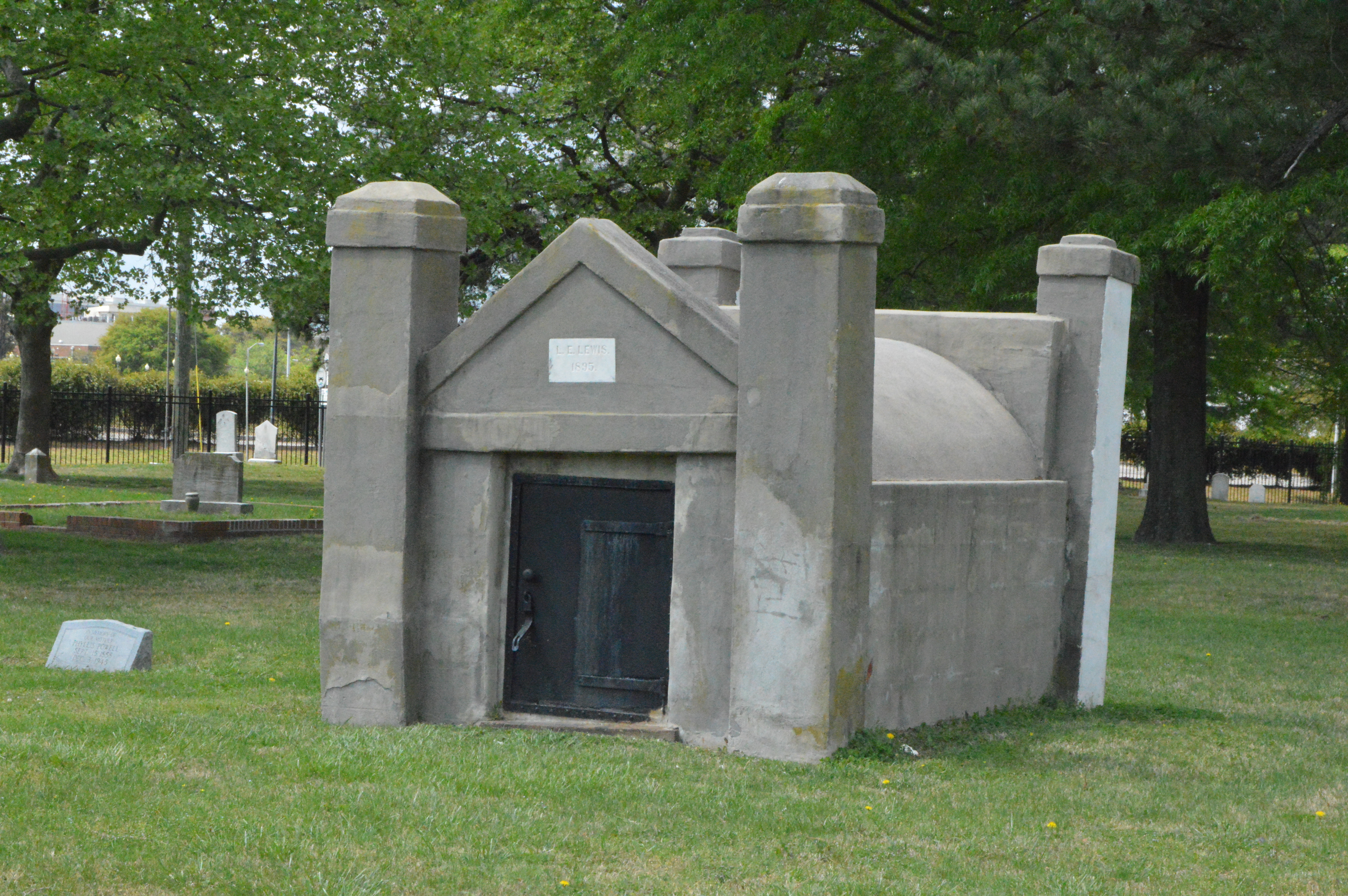
- Mausoleum in the southwestern quadrant

- Location within Virginia Location within the United States
- Location: 238 E. Princess Anne Rd., Norfolk, Virginia
- Coordinates: 36°51′42″N 76°16′57″W
- Area: 50 acres (20 ha)
- Built: 1853
- Architect: John Deiterich Couper; William Couper; Edward Field Sandford, Jr.; Harold Van Buren Magonigle; Wickham C. Taylor; Clarence C. Meakin
- Architectural style: Greek Revival, Gothic Revival, Exotic Revival
- NRHP reference No.: 13000643
- VLR No.: 122-0116

Significant dates
- Added to NRHP: August 27, 2013
- Designated VLR: June 19, 2013

Elmwood Cemetery is a historic municipal cemetery located at Norfolk, Virginia. It was established in 1853, and is filled with monuments and mausoleums that embody the pathos and symbolism of the Christian view of death as a temporary sleep. A notable monument is the Recording Angel by William Couper (1853–1942) at the Couper Family plot. The Core Mausoleum (1910–1915) designed by Harold Van Buren Magonigle (1867–1935), with sculptures by Edward Field Sanford, Jr. (1886–1951), is another notable resource.

It was listed on the National Register of Historic Places in 2013. It is contiguous with West Point Cemetery, listed in 2007.

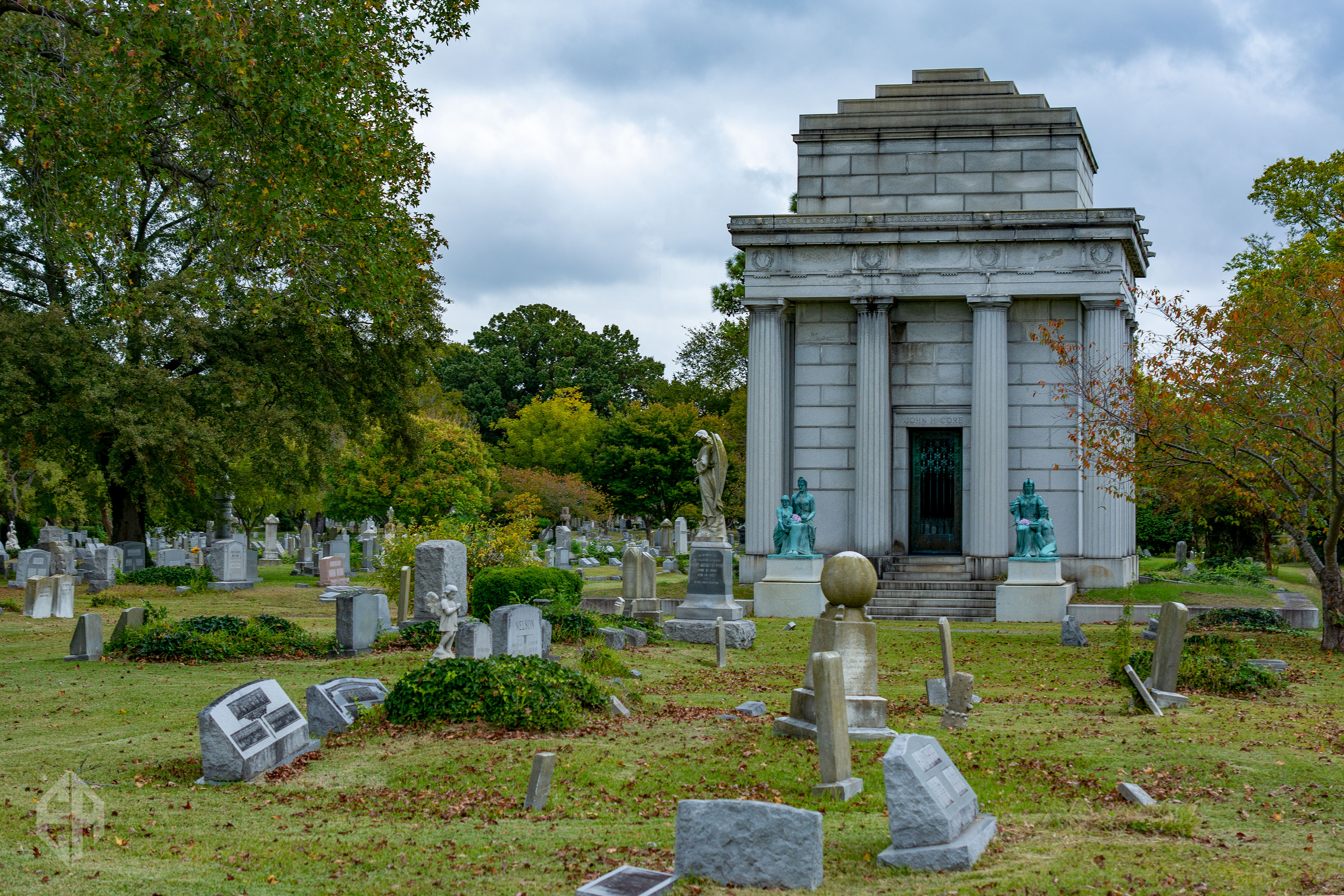
John H. Core Mausoleum

== Notable burials ==
- Pauline Adams (1874–1957) was an attorney and suffragette.
- Asa Biggs (1811–1878) was a U.S. Senator and Congressman.
- William M. Carr (1829–1884) was a Union Navy sailor in the American Civil War and a recipient of the U.S. military's highest decoration, the Medal of Honor, for his actions at the Battle of Mobile Bay.
- John F. Dezendorf (1834–1894) was a U.S. Congressman from Virginia.
- Samuel Face (1923–2001) was an American inventor and co-developer of some of the most important advances in concrete floor technology and wireless controls.
- Captain William Face (1827–1894) served as Acting Master of CSS Teaser during the Battle of Hampton Roads (March 8–9, 1862).
- Sarah Lee Odend'hal Fain (1888–1962) was a schoolteacher and politician from Virginia. With Helen Timmons Henderson, in 1923 she was one of the first two women elected to the Virginia House of Delegates, and to the Virginia General Assembly as a whole. She is buried next to her husband, Walter Colquitt Fain (1888–1974).
- Vice Admiral Albert Weston Grant (1856–1930) was a naval officer who served during the Spanish-American War and World War I.
- Hugh Blair Grigsby (1806–1881) was a historian and author, and owner and editor of Norfolk's American Beacon newspaper.
- Robert M. Hughes (1855–1940) was a Virginia lawmaker who served as a president of The Virginia Bar Association and helped to establish what would become Old Dominion University in Norfolk, Virginia.
- William Lamb (1835–1909) was an American newspaper editor, politician, businessman, and soldier, noted for his role as a Confederate States Army officer in commanding the Confederate garrison at Fort Fisher at the mouth of the Cape Fear River during the Civil War.
- Francis Mallory (1807–1860) was a U.S. Congressman, American naval officer, railroad executive, and physician.
- Lucien D. Starke (1826–1902), state legislator, attorney, and newspaper publisher
- Lucien D. Starke Jr. (1868–1931), attorney and newspaper publisher
- Colonel Walter H. Taylor (1838–1916) was adjutant to Robert E. Lee during the Civil War and later a Virginia politician, author, banker, lawyer, and railroad executive.
- Governor Littleton Waller Tazewell, Sr. (1774–1860) was a U.S. Senator and 26th Governor of Virginia.
