= William Fields Carter =

American politician (1908–1999)

Member of the Virginia House of Delegates from the 38th district
- In office 1954–1958

Personal details
- Born: April 23, 1908 Martinsville, Virginia, U.S.
- Died: April 3, 1999 (aged 90) Martinsville, Virginia, U.S.
- Resting place: Highland Burial Park; Danville, Virginia, U.S.
- Party: Independent; Democratic
- Spouse: Ella Mae Cousins (m. 1943)
- Relatives: Sallie C. Booker (grandmother)
- Education: University of Richmond (BA); University of Virginia School of Law (LLB); Princeton University (JD)
- Occupation: Politician; lawyer; educator

William Fields Carter (April 23, 1908 – April 3, 1999) was an American politician from Virginia. He served in the Virginia House of Delegates from 1954 to 1958.

== Early life and education ==
William Fields Carter was born on April 23, 1908, in Martinsville, Virginia, to Ella (née Booker) and Thomas Withers Carter. His grandmother was state delegate Sallie C. Booker. He graduated from Martinsville High School. He graduated with a Bachelor of Arts from the University of Richmond in 1930. He was a member of Phi Beta Kappa. He later graduated with a Bachelor of Laws from the University of Virginia School of Law and a Juris Doctor from Princeton University.

== Career ==
Carter was head of the history department at Fork Union Military Academy from 1930 to 1936. He then taught at Lane High School in Charlottesville for two years. He served as an agent in the Federal Bureau of Investigation under J. Edgar Hoover. He received an award for outstanding service. He then became a commanding officer of armed guard units in the U.S. Navy. He served on board the USS George Washington and attained the rank of lieutenant. He served on the Naval Court Martial Board.

In 1940, Carter returned to Martinsville to practice law in the firm Carter and Carter with his brother Robert Lumpkin Carter. He retired in 1995. He was an assistant trial justice for Martinsville and Henry County. In 1940, he organized the Young Democrats of Martinsville and Henry County. He was elected as an independent candidate to the Virginia House of Delegates, representing the 38th district, in 1953. He served from 1954 to 1958. He was re-elected in 1955 as a Democrat. He did not seek re-election in 1957. He was part of a group of moderate state delegates known as the "young Turks".

== Personal life ==
Carter married Ella Mae "Stringy" Cousins, daughter of Archie Keen Cousins, on June 19, 1943. He was member and deacon of First Baptist Church and was a Sunday school teacher.

Carter died on April 3, 1999, at his home on Parkview Avenue in Martinsville. He was buried in Highland Burial Park in Danville.
