= Sallie C. Booker =

American politician

Member of the Virginia House of Delegates from Henry County
- In office January 13, 1926 – January 8, 1930
- Preceded by: George L. Mitchell
- Succeeded by: Thomas B. Stanley

Personal details
- Born: Sallie Catherine Cook; August 28, 1857 Franklin County, Virginia, U.S.
- Died: December 20, 1944 (aged 87) Martinsville, Virginia, U.S.
- Party: Democratic
- Spouse: Jesse Wootten Booker
- Relatives: William Fields Carter (grandson)

Sallie Catherine Cook Booker (August 28, 1857 – December 20, 1944) was a schoolteacher and politician from Virginia. She was the third woman elected to the Virginia House of Delegates, and to the Virginia General Assembly as a whole.

== Life and career ==
Sallie Catherine Cook was born in Franklin County, Virginia. On May 22, 1877, she married Jesse Wootten Booker, with whom she had seven children. Early in married life the couple moved to Martinsville, where she became active in a number of clubs and civic organizations, including the First Methodist Church and the United Daughters of the Confederacy. She was politically active as well, being a member of both the Fifth District Congressional Committee and the Democratic Executive Committee, and also spent over twenty-five years as a schoolteacher. A plot of land which she owned was used to demarcate one of the boundaries of Martinsville in 1892 when it was rechartered an independent city.

Booker first ran for the House of Delegates in 1926, on the Democratic ticket; she was unopposed. She began the 1928 election season without opposition as well, but soon was challenged by Republican R. L. Stone, of Bassett, who ran under the slogan, "Membership in the General Assembly is a man's job". Nevertheless, after winning reelection she said that her opponent had run a "gentlemanly campaign – entirely free from 'mud slinging' and when defeated was too gallant to 'sulk in his tents'". During her time in Richmond Booker's deskmate in the Assembly was James H. Price, later to become Governor of Virginia. For portions of her term she served alongside three women: Sarah Lee Fain of Norfolk, Vinnie Caldwell of Galax, and Helen Ruth Henderson of Buchanan County, whose mother had with Fain been one of the first two women elected to the House of Delegates, in 1924.

After serving two terms in office Booker decided to retire from politics, looking after her sick husband until his death while taking care of the house and garden as well. Her husband died in September 1935. In 1942, she returned to Richmond to witness the gubernatorial inauguration of Colgate Darden, reconnecting with a number of former colleagues, including Harry F. Byrd, then Senator, who called her "Mother Booker". She died at the Shacklesford hospital in Martinsville after two months' illness, and was interred in the family plot in that city's Oakwood Cemetery.

Her grandson was state delegate William Fields Carter.
