= Orra Henderson Moore Gray Langhorne =

American writer, reformer and activist

Orra Henderson Moore Gray Langhorne (March 8, 1841 – May 6, 1904) was an American writer, reformer, and an early supporter and activist for women's suffrage in Virginia. Langhorne held progressive views for her time, often writing in favor of racial reconciliation, improved educational opportunities for African Americans, and women's rights. She founded the Virginia Suffrage Society, one of the first women's suffrage organizations in the state of Virginia.

== Early life, family, and marriage ==
Langhorne was born Orra Henderson Moore Gray in Rockingham County, Virginia, on March 8, 1841, to Algernon S. Gray, a "Unionist" and "slaveholding abolitionist" and Annie Henderson Gray. After her mother died in 1852, Langhorne and two of her sisters lived for several years with their widowed uncle, Douglas Gray.

Langhorne graduated from Hollins Institute (now called Hollins University) in 1859.

She married Thomas Nelson Langhorne on October 14, 1871. They lived in Lynchburg, Virginia, her husband's hometown, where they operated a general store. They also owned several properties, which they rented out to white and African American tenants.

Thomas Langhorne died on October 31, 1889, and the couple had no children.

== Work as a writer and reformer ==
Langhorne was raised in a family with liberal views, which she carried into adulthood—much to the dismay and disapproval of her neighbors. Her views on racial reconciliation and improved educational opportunities for African Americans were progressive for her time. Of her hope for racial reconciliation, Langhorne wrote, "As time goes on, we may hope that old prejudices and animosities will be forgotten. Why should we see with dead men's eyes? The venerable past is past."

Langhorne began expressing her views on post-war reconciliation, African American advancement, and women's suffrage in writing through articles in local and national newspapers. By 1880, Langhorne had her own column in Southern Workman, consisting of "character sketches, white and black; personal reminisces of the war and earlier days; and accounts of color school and the progress of both races in the New South." Southern Workman, which was published by the Hampton Institute (later called Hampton University) of which she was a longtime supporter. Shortly after the Hampton Institute opened, Langhorne wrote to then-principal Brigadier General Samuel C. Armstrong requesting admission for a family of her former slaves; the boys of the family were admitted and their mother served in the "girl's industrial room."

In 1895, Langhorne was elected the Woman's National Press Association vice president from Virginia.

Langhorne also presented three papers to American Social Science Association on the status of African Americans in Virginia, and served one year (1900-1901) as secretary of the associations Department of Social Economy .

== Work in the suffragist movement ==
Langhorne petitioned Virginia's General Assembly twice in favor of women's suffrage: first in 1880 to allow women to vote in the presidential election, and then in 1894, arguing for female property owners to have the right to vote in state and national elections. Both attempts were unsuccessful.

In 1893, Langhorne founded the Virginia Suffrage Society (later called the Virginia Woman Suffrage Association) as part of the National American Woman's Suffrage Association (NAWSA). The Virginia Suffrage Society was one of the first suffrage organizations in the state of Virginia; the Virginia State Woman Suffrage Association, founded and led by Anna Whitehead Bodeker in the 1870s, was the first, but it shut down within a few years after struggling to garner widespread support.

Langhorne served as the president of the Virginia Suffrage Society, earning her a slot as a vice-president of NAWSA. In 1896, Langhorne testified before a United States Senate committee hearing on suffrage alongside other NAWSA members.

Despite Langhorne's attempts to rally support for women's suffrage in Virginia, the activities and successes of the Virginia Suffrage Society were limited because Langhorne was working largely on her own. The Virginia Suffrage Society closed down before the turn of the century due to low membership. In her 1898 report to NAWSA (the final report she would write on behalf of the society she founded), Langhorne was optimistic about the future of women's suffrage in Virginia—and offered insight into some of the challenges faced by then suffrage movement. She wrote: "There is a steady increase of progressive sentiment in the State, particularly with the young people [...] This would be greater but for the determined opposition of many of the clergy."

== Death and legacy ==
Langhorne died on May 6, 1904, at the home of her brother-in-law, Foxhall A. Daingerfield, in Lexington, Kentucky. She is buried at Presbyterian Cemetery in Lynchburg.

Langhorne's name is featured on the Wall of Honor on the Virginia Women's Monument, located in Capitol Square in Richmond.
