= Albert W. Grant =

United States Navy admiral

Albert Weston Grant
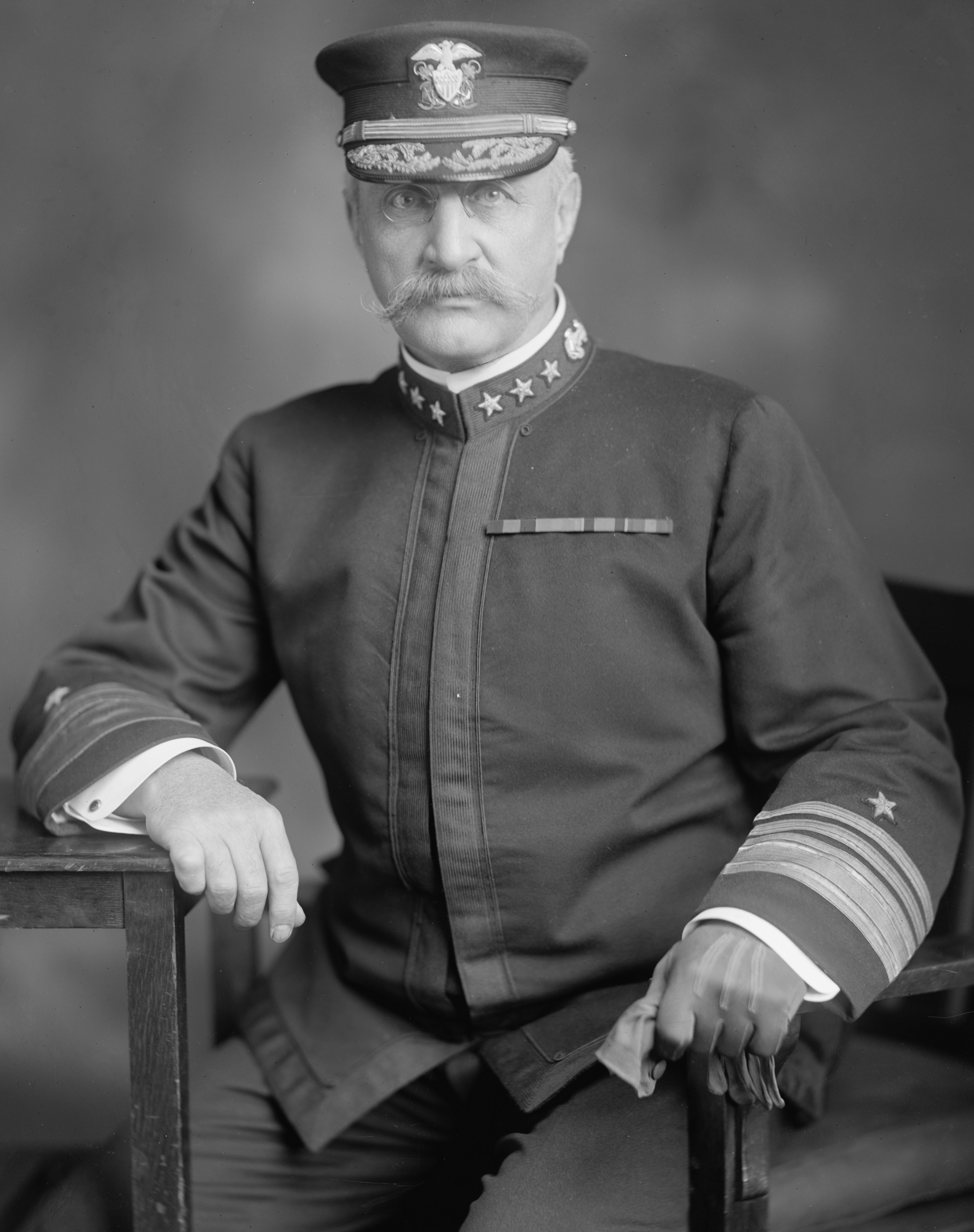
- Born: April 14, 1856; East Benton, Maine, US
- Died: September 30, 1930 (aged 74); Philadelphia, Pennsylvania, US
- Military career
- Allegiance: United States of America
- Branch: United States Navy
- Service years: 1877–1920
- Rank: Vice Admiral
- Commands: Battleship Force 1, U.S. Atlantic Fleet
- Conflicts: Spanish-American War; World War I
- Awards: Distinguished Service Medal

Albert Weston Grant (April 14, 1856 – September 30, 1930) was an admiral of the United States Navy. He served during the Spanish–American War and was commander of Battleship Force 1, Atlantic Fleet, in World War I.

== Biography ==
Grant was born on April 14, 1856, at East Benton, Maine. He grew up at Stevens Point, Wisconsin, with his pioneer family and won a competitive appointment to the United States Naval Academy, from which he graduated on June 20, 1877. Following service in USS Pensacola, Lackawanna, Alliance, Passaic, and Iroquois, he served ashore at the Norfolk Navy Yard, received torpedo training, and served briefly at the Naval War College.

Duty in Trenton, Richmond, Saratoga, and Yorktown preceded his return to Norfolk to supervise major repairs to Pensacola which entailed pioneer work in applying electricity to warships and then reported to Concord. On May 9, 1893, his commission as a lieutenant reached him while he was serving in that gunboat. A tour in cruiser San Francisco ended in the summer of 1894 when Grant was ordered back to the Naval Academy for duty as an instructor. Detached some three years later, he returned to sea in Helena and served off the coast of Cuba in Massachusetts during the Spanish–American War.

Transferred to Machias on September 8, 1898, Grant was serving in her when promoted to lieutenant commander on July 1, 1900, a month before orders sent him back to the Academy for two more years as an instructor. Three years of service in the Far East followed — as executive officer of Oregon and then as commanding officer of the patrol yacht Frolic — before he returned to Annapolis where he was promoted to commander and placed in charge of the Seamanship Department. During this assignment, he prepared a study of naval tactics, The School of the Ship, which became a standard textbook.

On July 22, 1907, Grant reported to the Naval War College for instruction and, upon completing the course in the autumn, assumed command of the Arethusa, which was the fuel tender to the Great White Fleet's destroyer flotilla. Grant took the Arethusa around Cape Horn to the Pacific. Detached on the last day of March 1908, he embarked in Connecticut as chief of staff to the Commander of the Atlantic Fleet. During that tour of duty, he was promoted to captain on July 1, 1909. He relinquished his post as chief of staff on October 26, 1909, but remained in Connecticut as her commanding officer.

Grant became commandant of the Philadelphia Navy Yard on March 21, 1910, and simultaneously took command of the 4th Naval District. Two years later, he became head of the Atlantic Reserve Fleet. Command of the new battleship Texas came in 1913 and command of Submarine Flotilla, Atlantic Fleet, followed two years later.

In the summer of 1917 — some three months after the United States entered World War I — Grant took over Battleship Force 1, Atlantic Fleet, with additional duty in command of Squadron 2 and Division 4. This position gave him the rank of vice admiral. During the last four months of 1918, Grant served as acting commander of the entire western portion of the U.S. Atlantic Fleet during the absence of Admiral Henry T. Mayo. He was awarded the Distinguished Service Medal for his World War I service. In 1919, he became commandant of the Washington Navy Yard and superintendent of the Naval Gun Factory.

Retired on April 6, 1920, Grant died in Philadelphia on September 30, 1930. Grant and his wife Florence Southall (Sharp) Grant are buried at Elmwood Cemetery in Norfolk, Virginia.

== Namesake ==
In 1943, the destroyer USS Albert W. Grant was named in honor of Grant, sponsored by his granddaughter, Miss Nell Preston Grant.
