= Lucien D. Starke =

American politician and newspaper publisher (1826–1902)

Member of the Virginia House of Representatives
- In office 1875–1876
- In office 1877–1876

Personal details
- Born: Lucian Douglas Starke; February 9, 1826 Cold Harbor, Virginia, US
- Died: February 21, 1902 (aged 76) Norfolk, Virginia, US
- Resting place: Elmwood Cemetery (Norfolk, Virginia)
- Children: Lucien D. Starke Jr.
- Occupation: Attorney and newspaper publisher

Lucien Douglas Starke (February 9, 1826 – February 21, 1902) was an American politician, lawyer, and newspaper editor and publisher. He served two terms in the Virginia House of Delegates. Starke was the president of Landmark Publishing Company which published the Norfolk Landmark newspaper.

== Early life ==
Lucien Douglas Starke was born at Pleasant Level near Cold Harbor, Virginia, on February 9, 1826. His parents were Eliza Gregorty (nểe New) and Colonel Bowling Starke. His maternal grandfather was Anthony New, a United States Congressman and a colonel in the American Revolution.

His family moved to Richmond, Virginia where he attended private schools until he was sixteen years old. In 1841, he apprenticed with the Richmond Enquirer newspaper for five years.

== Career ==
Starke worked for the Richmond Enquirer. He then became the foreman of the Norfolk Argus in Norfolk, Virginia in 1847. In 1850, he moved to Elizabeth City, North Carolina where he established and was editor of the Democratic Pioneer, which strong opposed the Whig newspaper Old North State. He organized the Albemarle Engine Company, a volunteer firehouse, in 1850.

Starke was a delegate to the 1852 Democratic National Convention which nominated Franklin Pierce. While continuing to edit his newspaper, he studied law under William F. Martin. The North Carolina Supreme Court licensed Starke to practice law in 1858. He sold his newspaper in 1859 to pursue a career in law. Presidents Pierce and James Buchanan appointed Starke as the collector of customs in Elizabeth City. Starke served in this capacity, starting in1853 until he resigned when Abraham Lincoln became president.

Before the Civil War, Starke was the colonel of the Third North Carolina Militia. On July 17, 1861, he joined the Confederate Army and was tasked with building and commanding a battery on the Pasquotank River to defend Elizabeth City. He was promoted to captain and became assistant commissary of subsistence and, later, acting inspector general in the Seventeenth Regiment of North Carolina Troops (Martin's Brigade) on May 16, 1862. He fought in the Bermuda Hundred campaign, the Battle of Cold Harbor, and near Peterburg, Virginia. He surrendered with Johnston's army in Greensboro, North Carolina.

After the war, he became a lawyer in Norfolk, Virginia in 1867. Two of his sons joined his law practice, known as Starke & Starke. Starke served two terms in the Virginia House of Delegates, 1875 to 1876 and 1876 to 1877. Starke was the president of Landmark Publishing Company which published the Norfolk Landmark newspaper.

== Personal life ==
Stark married Elizabeth Ferebee Marchant of Indiantown, Currituck County, North Carolina on January 8, 1855. Their children were Eliza New Starke, Emily Daugé Starke, Elizabeth Marchant Starke, Marian McMorine Starke, and Gideon Marchant Starke. She died on April 18, 1863, while taking refuge away from the coast. Because his home in Elizabeth City was occupied by the Union Army, Starke and his children lived with relatives until 1865. He moved to Norfolk, Virginia with his children in December 1867.

Starke married Tabitha Lucretia Pippen of Tarboro Edgecombe, North Carolina on January 8, 1868. Their children were Lucien D. Starke Jr., Tabitha Pippen Starke, Mary Mayo Starke, Virginia Lee Starke, and William Wallace Starke.

Starke was a member of St. Luke's Episcopal Church in Norfolk and the Masonic Lodge No. 164. He was also president of the Norfolk Board of Health.

Starke died from pneumonia on February 21, 1902, at his home in Norfolk at the age of 76 years. His funeral was at St. Luke's Episcopal Church. He was buried at Elmwood Cemetery in Norfolk.
