= Lucien D. Starke Jr. =

American lawyer and newspaper publisher (1868–1931)

- Born: Lucien Douglas Starke Jr. October 26, 1868; Norfolk, Virginia, US
- Died: July 31, 1931 (aged 62); Norfolk, Virginia, US
- Burial place: Elmwood Cemetery (Norfolk, Virginia)
- Education: University of Virginia
- Occupations: Lawyer, newspaper publisher
- Employer(s): Starke & Starke; Norfolk Virginian-Pilot
- Parent: Lucien D. Starke

Lucien Douglas Starke Jr. (October 26, 1868 – July 31, 1931) was an American newspaper publisher and attorney. He was the president and publisher of the Norfolk Virginian-Pilot. It continues today as The Virginian-Pilot, Virginia's largest daily newspaper.

== Early life ==
Lucien Douglas Starke Jr. was born on October 26, 1868, in Norfolk, Virginia. His parents were Tabitha Lucretia (née Pippen) and Lucian D. Starke. His father was a lawyer, newspaper publisher, and a member of the Virginia House of Delegates. His mother died when he was eight years old.

Starke attended an elementary school in Norfolk that was operated by William R. Galt. Next, he attended Bethel Military Academy in Fauquier County. He studied law at the University of Virginia under John B. Minor. While at the university, he was a member of the fraternity of Delta Psi (St. Anthony Hall). He graduated with a bachelor of law in 1899 and passed the bar.

== Career ==
In 1889, Starke joined his father, brother W. W. Starke, and William Bruce Martin in the Norfolk law firm of Starke & Martin, later known as Starke & Starke. The firm's name changed to Starke, Venable & Starke and, then, L. D. Starke and W. W. Starke. In November 1898, Starke was a founding member of the Norfolk and Portsmouth Bar Association.

Starke was a staff member of Governor James Hoge Tyler from 1898 to 1902, receiving the rank of colonel. In August 1901, he joined the governor's party to attend Virginia Day at the Pan American Exposition in Buffalo, New York.

In 1896, Starke negotiated the purchase of the struggling Norfolk Pilot for client, Albert H. Grandy. Starke became treasurer of the newspaper's operating company. The Norfolk Pilot merged with the Norfolk Virginian in 1898, forming the Virginian-Pilot. Starke served on the newspaper's boar of directors. In 1900, he was the secretary of the Virginian-Pilot, with Grandy as president. Later, he became the newspaper's vice president and acting president.

After Grandy died in August 1903, Starke became the newspaper's president. He purchased his father's former newspaper, the Norfolk Landmark on January 1, 1912. After practicing for law thirty years, Starke left the field in 1921 and became the publisher of the Norfolk Virginian-Pilot newspaper. Under his leadership, what had once been a small daily newspaper emerged as a metropolitan journal, with subscribers increasing from 16,000 to more than 48,000.

Starke owned oyster rights in Little Bay with Lewis B. White; they were paid $21,950 in 1931 for the loss of these rights when the United States Naval Station opened in Hampton Roads. He was also a director of the Virginia National Bank of Norfolk and the Seaboard Fire Insurance Company in Portsmouth.

== Personal life ==
Starke married Mary Bell White on June 4, 1903. She was the daughter of Clementine Bell White and Major Lewis B. Bell. They lived on a farm in Princess Anne County, some eight miles from Norfolk and close to Virginia Beach.

In 1891, Starke was a founding board member of the Norfolk Union Mission. He served on the board of the Ballentine Home and the Mt. Sinai Hospital Foundation Fund. He was a member of the Chesapeake Country Club, Norfolk Country Club, and the Princess Anne Country Club. He attended St. Luke's Episcopal Church in Norfolk.

Starke suffered a heart attack in July 1931. Starke died three weeks later on July 31, 1931, in the Sarah Leigh Hospital of Norfolk at the age of 63. He was buried in Elmwood Cemetery in Norfolk.

== See also ==
- List of St. Anthony Hall members
