= Nancy Melvina Caldwell =

American schoolteacher and politician (1868–1956)

Member of the Virginia House of Delegates from Carroll County
- In office January 11, 1928 – January 8, 1930
- Preceded by: J. Swanson Smith
- Succeeded by: Byrum P. Goad

Personal details
- Born: August 4, 1868 Carroll County, Virginia, U.S.
- Died: February 11, 1956 (aged 87) Carroll, Virginia, U.S.
- Party: Democratic

Nancy Melvina "Vinnie" Caldwell (August 4, 1868 – February 11, 1956) was a schoolteacher and politician from Virginia.

== Life and career ==
Caldwell was born in Carroll County, Virginia, in the southwest portion of the state, to John Barger and Fannie Delilah (Givens) Caldwell. Her father was a native of Galax, and two years after her birth he returned there with his family. Caldwell was educated at the local public school, and at her mother's urging sat the exam to become a public school teacher. Upon receiving her certificate she began teaching in the area, ultimately holding positions at twelve schools during her career as an educator. She stopped working in the 1890s due to a variety of frustrations; she felt that her salary was too low, and that it was difficult in general to teach in an impoverished rural district. Consequently, she left Galax, later leaving Virginia altogether.

Caldwell had returned to Galax by 1920 and become involved in local politics, although the catalyst for her activities is unknown. Carroll County's branch of the Democratic Party nominated her to run for the Virginia House of Delegates in 1927. Southwestern Virginia was a Republican stronghold; nevertheless, although Republicans captured every other major office in the county, Caldwell defeated her opponent, a man, by a vote of 1,990 to 1,895. Upon taking her seat in January, 1928, she became one of four women in the Virginia General Assembly; the other three were Sarah Lee Fain, Sallie C. Booker, and Helen Ruth Henderson, whose mother had with Fain been one of the first two women elected to the House. During her time in Richmond Caldwell served on the Committees on Schools and Colleges, on Asylums and Prisons, and on Manufactures and Mechanic Arts. A staunch Democrat and ally of Governor of Virginia Harry F. Byrd, she assisted in the passage of a number of bills, including for education and for employment of the handicapped; she also was active in supporting bills to build the Blue Ridge Parkway and the Jackson Ferry Bridge. Many of the bills she introduced related to Galax and Carroll County; she also was patron of an unsuccessful bill which would have provided $100,000 to create pensions for mothers.

Caldwell did not run again in 1929, and returned to her hometown, where she devoted herself to welfare work, serving for more than twenty years as a volunteer social worker. She maintained interest in current events in her post-legislative career, and was active in numerous clubs and organizations, including the Virginia Federation of Music Clubs, the Federation Women's and Professional Club and the Democrat Club. She was a Methodist. For many years she lived with her brother. Her brother J. K. Caldwell was long prominent in local affairs as a businessman and physician. At her death Nancy Caldwell was buried in the family cemetery in East Galax.

Caldwell was named one of the Library of Virginia's Virginia Women in History for 2015. She was nominated on behalf of the sixth-grade students of American History at St. Paul School in Cana.
