= The Virginian-Pilot =

Newspaper in Norfolk, Virginia, US

- The November 6, 2025 front page of The Virginian-Pilot
- Type: Daily newspaper
- Format: Broadsheet
- Owner: Tribune Publishing
- Founder: Samuel Slover
- Publisher: Par Ridder (General Manager)
- Editor: Kevin Goyette
- Founded: 1865
- Headquarters: 703 Mariners Row; Newport News, VA 23606
- Circulation: 13,900 Average print circulation
- ISSN: 0889-6127
- Website: www.pilotonline.com

The Virginian-Pilot is the daily newspaper for Hampton Roads, Virginia, United States. Commonly known as The Pilot, it is Virginia's largest daily. It serves the five cities of South Hampton Roads as well as several smaller towns across southeast Virginia and northeast North Carolina. It was a locally owned, family enterprise from its founding in 1865 at the close of the American Civil War until its sale to Tribune Publishing in 2018. Its headquarters is in Newport News, and prior to 2020 was in Norfolk.

The Virginian-Pilot is owned by parent company Tribune Publishing. This company was acquired by Alden Global Capital, which operates its media properties through Digital First Media, in May 2021.

== Pulitzer Prizes ==
The newspaper has won three Pulitzer Prizes. The first was won in 1929 by editor Louis Jaffe, who received the Pulitzer Prize for Editorial Writing for "An Unspeakable Act of Savagery", an editorial which condemned lynching. Jaffe mentored the paper's next editor, Lenoir Chambers, who in 1960 received the same prize for his editorials on desegregation, as exemplified by "The Year Virginia Closed the Schools" and "The Year Virginia Opened the Schools". The paper was one of the few in Virginia to publicly support the end of Jim Crow. In 1985, Thomas Turcol was awarded the Pulitzer Prize for General News Reporting for his coverage of corruption in Chesapeake. Reporters at The Pilot have also finished as Pulitzer finalists three times since 2007.

== History ==
The Virginian-Pilot and its sister afternoon edition, the Ledger-Star (which ceased publication in 1995) were created by Samuel L. Slover as the result of several mergers of papers dating back to 1865. The Virginian-Pilot covered the Wright brothers' early flights. Slover's nephew Frank Batten Sr. became publisher at age 27 in 1954. He expanded the Virginian-Pilot's parent company, which soon evolved into Landmark Communications and later Landmark Media Enterprises, by acquiring other newspapers and radio and television stations and by creating The Weather Channel, now owned by a group of investors led by NBC Universal. In Norfolk, on September 1, 1923, the company founded Virginia's first radio station, WTAR. In 1950 it added Channel 4 WTAR-TV (now Channel 3 WTKR) and in 1961, it signed on 95.7 WTAR-FM (now WVKL).

The paper was among the first available online as a part of the Compuserve experiment in early 1980s where the paper and 10 others around the country transmitted text versions of stories daily to Compuserve's host computers in Ohio.

Frank Batten Jr. became publisher in 1991 and expanded on digitizing the paper. In 1993 The Virginian-Pilot was one of the first newspapers in the country to launch a sister website, Pilotonline.com. Batten Jr. stepped down as the paper's publisher, becoming Landmark Communications' Chairman and CEO. "Dee" Carpenter became publisher in 1995, followed by Bruce Bradley in 2005, Maurice Jones in 2008, David Mele in 2012 and Patricia Richardson in 2014. The paper published a podcast in 2017. The Shot was created by reporters Gary Harki and Joanne Kimberlin and dealt with the unsolved 2010 murder of Norfolk police officer Victor Decker.

After The Pilot was sold to Tronc in 2018, no new publisher was named. Marisa Porto was named the newspaper's editor, but she left the next year. Interim General Manager Par Ridder said a search would begin for a new editor for the newsroom and a new general manager to oversee the business side of the newspaper.

Kris Worrell was named by Ridder as The Pilot's editor on July 22, 2019. She had previously been the executive editor of The Press of Atlantic City. Worrell graduated from Kempsville High in Virginia Beach and worked previously both for The Pilot and the Daily Press.

== Offices and corporate ==
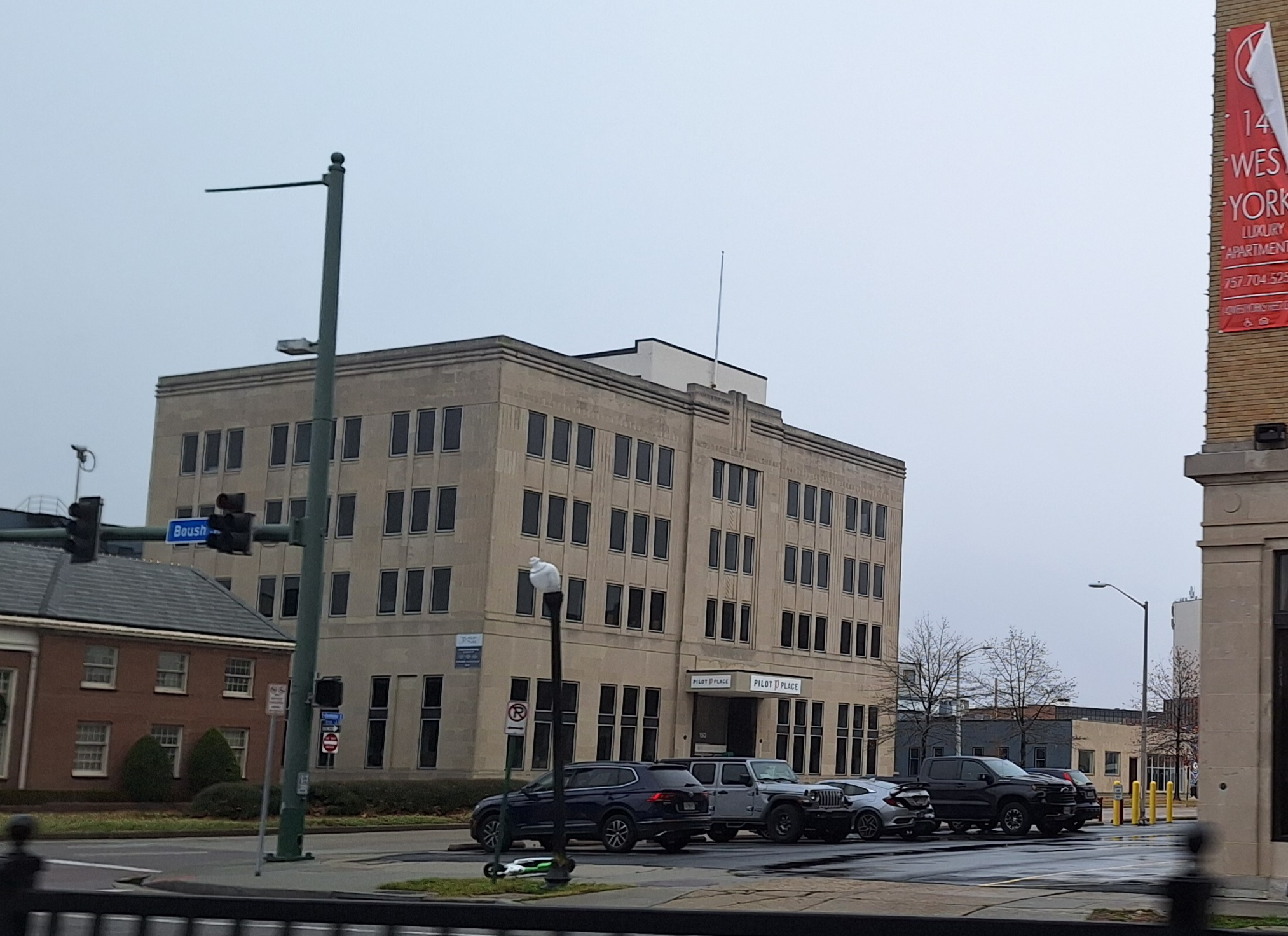
Pilot Place, the former headquarters

The paper's offices are shared with its sister paper, the Daily Press and are located at 703 Mariners Row, Newport News, VA 23606. It is in the City Center at Oyster Point complex. Both papers are owned by Tribune Publishing.

Beginning circa 1937, the headquarters were in Norfolk. In 2020, the newspaper moved, as Monument Companies bought the Norfolk complex for $9,500,000. This complex became Pilot Place, an apartment complex. The new headquarters in Newport News was already the offices of the Daily Press, which was the lessee.

== Sale to Tribune Publishing ==
On May 29, 2018, The Virginian-Pilot was purchased by Chicago-based media conglomerate Tribune Publishing, formerly known as Tronc, for a cash price of $34 million. The deal included the Pilot and all of its "outstanding interests" — including its subsidiary publications, the paper's Norfolk headquarters and its printing plant in Virginia Beach.

== See also ==
- Lucien D. Starke Jr.
