= USS Albert W. Grant =

Fletcher-class destroyer

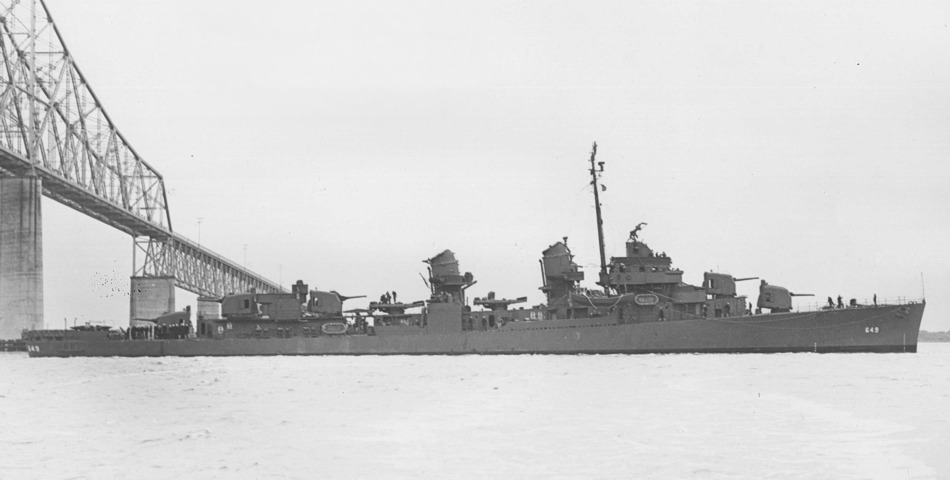

History

United States
- Namesake: Albert W. Grant
- Builder: Charleston Navy Yard
- Laid down: 30 December 1942
- Launched: 29 May 1943
- Commissioned: 24 November 1943
- Decommissioned: 16 July 1946
- Stricken: 14 April 1971
- Fate: Scrapped, 30 May 1972

General characteristics
- Class & type: Fletcher-class destroyer
- Displacement: 2,050 tons
- Length: 376 ft 5 in (114.73 m)
- Beam: 39 ft 7 in (12.07 m)
- Draft: 13 ft 9 in (4.19 m)
- Propulsion: 60,000 shp (45,000 kW); geared turbines; 2 propellers
- Speed: 35.2 knots (65.2 km/h; 40.5 mph)
- Range: 6,500 nautical miles (12,000 km) at 15 kn (28 km/h)
- Complement: 329 officers and enlisted
- Armament: 5 × 5 in (127 mm) 38 cal dual purpose guns, 10 × Bofors 40 mm guns, 7 × Oerlikon 20 mm cannons, 10 × 21 inch (533 mm) torpedo tubes, 6 × depth charge projectors, 2 × depth charge tracks

USS Albert W. Grant (DD-649) was a Fletcher-class destroyer in the United States Navy during World War II. She was the only ship named for Vice Admiral Albert W. Grant (1856–1930), an admiral during World War I.

== Construction and commissioning ==
Albert W. Grant was laid down on 30 December 1942 at North Charleston, South Carolina, by the Charleston Navy Yard; launched on 29 May 1943, sponsored by Miss Nell Preston Grant, granddaughter of Admiral Grant; and commissioned on 24 November 1943.

== Service history ==
On the day of her commissioning, Albert W. Grant departed Charleston Navy Yard for a shakedown cruise to Bermuda. She returned to Charleston Navy Yard on 29 January 1944 for minor modifications.

=== 1944 ===
Albert W. Grant headed for Norfolk, Virginia, on 8 February, and five days later, she got underway to escort Hornet to Hawaii. They transited the Panama Canal, joined more ships at San Diego, and finally arrived at Pearl Harbor on 4 March.

On 4 April, the destroyer sailed for Majuro where she joined TF 58 for the invasion at Hollandia. During that New Guinea operation, from 21 to 29 April, Grant engaged in picket duty, inshore patrol duty, and covered landing force operations. On 29 April, she headed for the Caroline Islands with TG 58.3 and screened the carriers during strikes on Truk. The task group left for Majuro on 2 May and continued on to Pearl Harbor, arriving there on 11 May.

==== Marianas, Palaus and Philippines campaigns ====
After a brief respite, Albert W. Grant got underway on 29 May for Eniwetok, which served as the staging area for the invasion of the Marianas. On 11 June, she sailed to Saipan and commenced her gunfire support activities on 15 June. The destroyer was also involved in action against Tinian. She departed the Saipan area on 29 July and put into Eniwetok on 2 August. Following a brief upkeep period, the destroyer got underway for Purvis Bay, Solomon Islands, on 22 August.

The ship sortied with TG 32.5 on 6 September for the assault on the Palaus and, during a two-week period in mid-September, conducted pre-invasion bombardment and supported the landings on Peleliu and Angaur. On 29 September, she left for Manus Island. The destroyer remained there through 12 October, then sailed for the Philippines as a member of TG 77.2. On 17 October, Grant provided protection for Crosby while that fast transport landed troops on Suluan Island, Philippines. From 17 to 24 October, the destroyer provided fire support for the assault on Leyte.

==== Leyte Gulf ====
On 24 October, Albert W. Grant joined TG 77.2 and sailed to engage a Japanese task force reported steaming northward from the Sulu Sea toward Surigao Strait. That American battleship group met the Japanese force in the Battle of Surigao Strait, and Grant, along with other destroyers in advance of the main battle line, conducted a torpedo attack. During this attack, she was hit and severely damaged by gunfire, not only from Japanese naval forces, but also by its covering US battleships. Grant suffered 22 hits, many by six-inch shells. Fires broke out, and the ship lost steering control and all power. Thirty-eight men were killed and 104 were wounded. Although their ship was down by the bow and listing heavily to port, the destroyer's crew got her engines working again and enabled her to retire to American-controlled waters in Leyte Gulf.

While en route to Leyte, Grant weathered a typhoon before reaching the anchorage. Following temporary repairs, the ship sailed for Pearl Harbor on 30 October under tow by Hidatsa. She stopped en route at Seeadler Harbor and Majuro. Grant reached Pearl Harbor on 29 November and, three days later, sailed for Mare Island, California. Following her arrival on 9 December, the destroyer underwent major repair work.

=== 1945 ===
Albert W. Grant left the shipyard on 11 March 1945 and headed for Pearl Harbor. She arrived there on 25 March and began underway training exercises. On 23 April, the destroyer sailed for the Philippines. Grant reached Leyte on 13 May. She stood out of Manila on 3 June to escort General of the Army Douglas MacArthur, embarked in Boise, on a tour of the Philippines. Grant then sailed southwest toward Brunei Bay, Borneo, to rendezvous with TG 78.1 for the assault on Brunei Bay. On 10 June, she covered the landings there. The ship rejoined the MacArthur tour on the 11th and dropped anchor at Manila on 15 June.

Grant operated in Manila Bay until 27 June, when she got underway for Balikpapan, Borneo. From 30 June to 9 July, the destroyer covered operations against Balikpapan. She was back at Manila on 14 July. Grant then moved to the Marshalls and, upon her arrival at Eniwetok on 3 August, joined TF 49 for duty in the North Pacific. She sailed to Adak, Alaska, and the day before she arrived there, received word of the Japanese capitulation on 15 August, and sortied with TF 49 for Ominato, Japan. The task force arrived off Honshu on 8 September and anchored at Ominato on the 10th.

The destroyer remained on occupation duty in Japan through mid-November. Grant then sailed back to the United States. She arrived at Seattle, Washington, on 2 December, and upon her arrival, began overhaul. The destroyer was placed out of commission, in reserve at San Diego, on 16 July 1946. Her name was struck from the Navy list on 14 April 1971, and she was sold for scrapping.

== Awards ==
Albert W. Grant received seven battle stars for World War II and a Navy Unit Commendation for the Battle of Surigao Strait.
