= Martha Washington Inn =

Historic hotel in Abingdon, Virginia, USA

Coordinates: 36.7096°N 81.9755°W

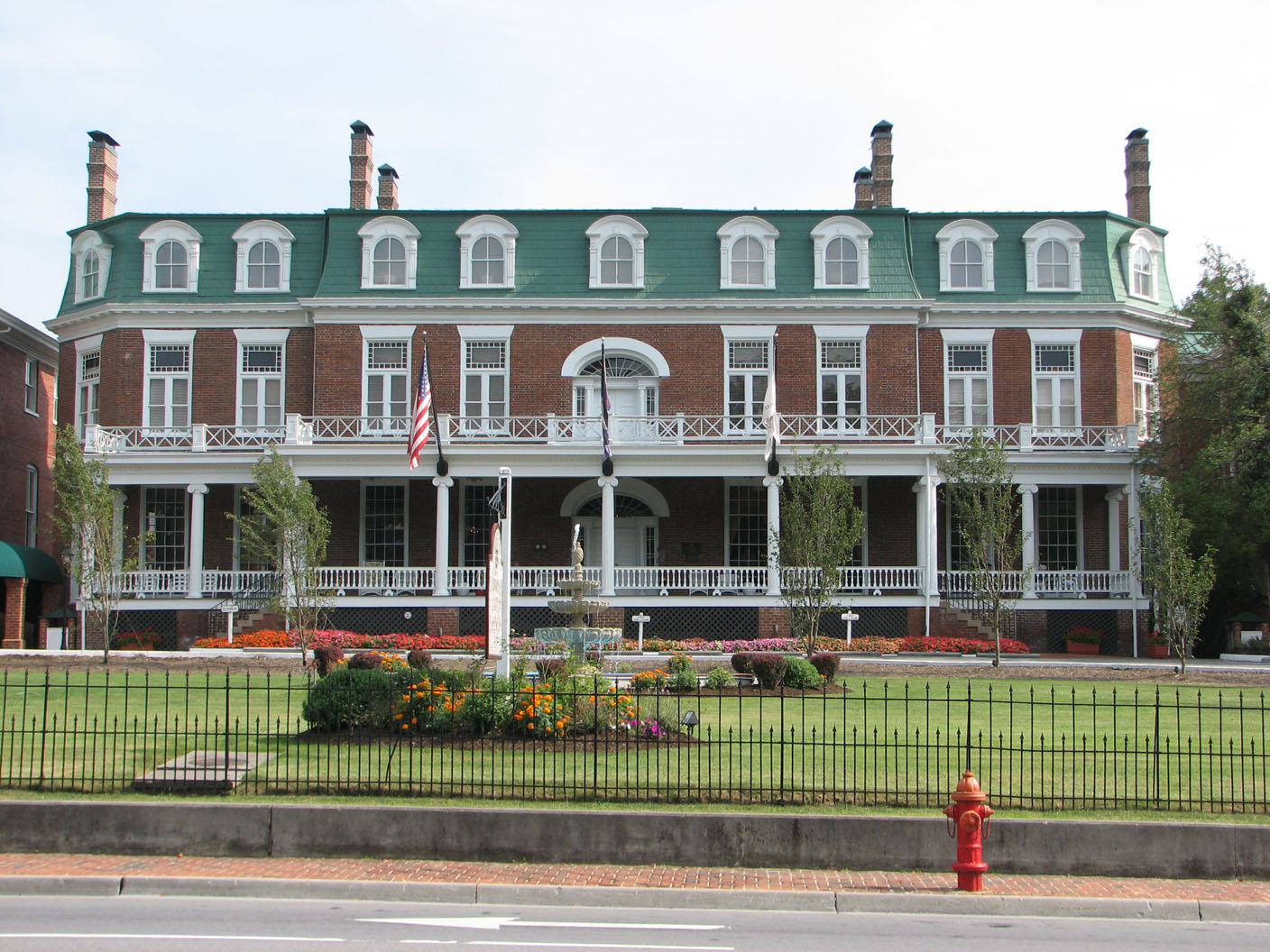
- The Martha Washington Inn
- Interactive map of the Martha Washington Inn area

General information
- Location: 150 W Main St., Abingdon, Virginia, USA, 24210
- Opening: 1935
- Owner: United Group

Website
- themartha.com

The Martha Washington Inn is a historic hotel located in Abingdon, Virginia. Originally built in 1832 by General Francis Preston, hero of the War of 1812, for his family of nine children, over the course of the last 174 years, the building has served as an upscale women's college, a Civil War hospital and barracks, and as a residence for visiting actors of the Barter Theatre. In addition to hotel services, the inn now offers spa treatments.

The Martha Washington Hotel & Spa is a member of Historic Hotels of America, the official program of the National Trust for Historic Preservation.

== History ==
In 1832, General Francis Preston built the brick residence for his family at a cost of $15,000. The mansion remained in the Preston family possession until 1858, when it was sold at the cost of $21,000 to the founders of Martha Washington College. The college devoted entirely to women operated for seventy years until finally succumbing to the Great Depression. At the time of the Civil War, the college served as the training ground for the Confederate unit, the Washington Mounted Rifles. After various skirmishes between United States and Confederate forces, wounded were brought to the school for treatment. It was also during this time period that the building attained the nickname, "The Martha." Among its post-war alumnae was the valedictorian of the Class of 1880, Nellie Nugent Somerville, who would go on to become the first woman elected to the Mississippi Legislature.

The architectural integrity of the Martha has been preserved for over 150 years. The original living room of the Preston family is now the main lobby of the inn. One of the original items owned by the Preston family is the Dutch-baroque grandfather clock which measures over nine feet tall. This beautiful clock, which was shipped from England by one of the Preston daughters, now takes its rightful place in the East Parlor of the inn.

After passing through various hands over the next three years, in 1935, the Martha Washington Inn opened. The inn has operated ever since in the capacity of a hotel. In 1984, the United Group, an investment group of businessmen, purchased the inn and paid for an 8 million dollar renovation. Eleven years later, the property was admitted to the Camberley Collection of historic places. Today, the Martha Washington Inn serves as both a hotel and spa.

== Famous guests ==
Many famous guests have spent the night at the Martha Washington Inn, including Eleanor Roosevelt, President Harry S. Truman, Lady Bird Johnson, Jimmy Carter, and Elizabeth Taylor. The hotel has also played host to actors performing at the Barter Theatre, which is adjacent to the inn, but now the actors usually stay at the Barter Inn.

== Ghosts ==
- The Yankee sweetheart

This story is about a tragic love affair between a student at Martha Washington College and her Yankee sweetheart. Although still a girl's college, Martha Washington College served as a hospital during the Civil War. Several of the girls did not return home during the war but bravely volunteered to stay at the school as nurses. Captain John Stoves, a Yankee officer, was severely wounded and captured in town. Soldiers carried Capt. Stoves through the cave system under Abingdon and up a secret stairway to the third floor of the building. Capt. Stoves lay gravely wounded in what is now Room 403. For weeks, a young student named Beth nursed and cared for him. She found herself falling in love with the brave captain, and he returned her sentiments. Often, Beth would lovingly play the violin to ease his pain and suffering. But, their love was not to last for long. As he lay dying, he called, "Play something, Beth, I'm going." Unfortunately, Beth was too late to escort him out with a song, because he died suddenly. Beth tearfully played a sweet southern melody as a tribute to him. When a Confederate officer entered and explained that he was taking Captain Stoves as a prisoner, Beth faced him triumphantly and said, "He has been pardoned by an officer higher than General Lee. Captain Stoves is dead." Beth died a few weeks later from typhoid fever. Many of the female students who later attended the college, as well as inn employees and guests, have heard Beth's sweet violin music in the night. Others report that Beth visits Room 403 to comfort her Yankee soldier.

- Reappearing Bloodstain

A young Confederate soldier in Abingdon was assigned to carry important papers about the location of the Union army to General Robert E. Lee. He was hopelessly in love with a young woman at the college. Knowing the risks he was facing, the brave soldier felt he must say farewell to his lady love before leaving. The soldier traveled through the cave system underlying Abingdon and used a secret stairway to enter the college. As the soldier was saying goodbye to his love, two Union officers came up the stairs and found them. With no way to escape, the young Confederate soldier was shot in front of his sweetheart, and, when he fell, his blood stained the floor. The strange thing is that through the years, the bloodstain continues to appear. Carpets over the area often develop mysterious holes over the stains. Even after the floors have been refinished, the stain continues to reappear, a sad reminder of the tragedy of the Civil War.

- The Phantom Horse

A phantom horse waits for his master outside the front steps, a Union soldier that was shot in front of the house in 1864. On moonless nights, the horse has been seen roaming the grounds searching for his owner and awaiting the call to ride home.

- The Basement Walls

The basement holds the spirits of black slaves, they were kept in an underground chamber and some were buried within its stone walls.

- The Trail Of Mud

Numerous accounts of a soldier hobbling with help from a crutch and leaving a trail of mud in his wake have been reported from a hallway of the Inn. Long past medical help, there is only speculation why he is here at the old hospital, a ball leaving only a hideous mangle of bone and sparse flesh had split his head.

- The Angry Spirit In The Tunnel

A tunnel once connected the Martha Washington Inn with the Barter Theatre. The entrance on the inn's side has been closed off for several years, but the section below the theater is still used to run electrical cables. Actors who used the tunnel to walk between the inn and the theater in the 1930s and 1940s reported encountering a malevolent spirit. The specter was never seen but sensed as a strong evil presence. The spirit is believed to be either a man who was killed when the tunnel collapsed in 1890 or a Confederate soldier who used the tunnel to smuggle ammunition out of the inn's basement during the Civil War.

== See also ==
- List of Historic Hotels of America
- Abingdon, Virginia
- Barter Theatre
