= Eva Mae Fleming Scott =

American pharmacist, businesswoman, and politician (1926–2019)

Member of the Virginia Senate from the 17th district
- In office January 9, 1980 – January 11, 1984
- Preceded by: James T. Edmunds
- Succeeded by: Edd Houck

Member of the Virginia House of Delegates from the 31st district
- In office January 12, 1972 – November 1979
- Preceded by: John Warren Cooke
- Succeeded by: R. Beasley Jones

Personal details
- Born: Eva Mae Fleming; May 6, 1926 Amelia County, Virginia, U.S.
- Died: March 28, 2019 (aged 92) Amelia County, Virginia
- Party: Republican
- Other political affiliations: Independent (1971–1979)
- Education: Longwood College; Medical College of Virginia

Eva Mae Fleming Scott (May 6, 1926 – March 28, 2019) was an American pharmacist, businesswoman and politician from Virginia. Despite redistricting problems, she served four consecutive two-year terms as delegate in the Virginia General Assembly. In 1979 she became the first woman elected to the Virginia State Senate, where she served a single term.

== Early and family life ==
Scott was a native of Amelia County, Virginia, and lived there for most of her life. From a Republican family – her father was the chairman of the Amelia County Republican Party – she attended Longwood College, graduating with a degree in English and Communications and a minor in business in 1947. She then attended the pharmacy school of the Medical College of Virginia before returning to Amelia and opening a pharmacy. She married local businessman Leander Scott, and had five children with him.

== Political career ==
Scott first won election to the Virginia House of Delegates in 1971, running as an independent after her predecessor had suffered a stroke. She had six weeks to campaign, and won by 121 votes. She was reelected three times, serving a total of four two-year terms. Soon after her first victory redistricting based on the 1970 census happened. Scott and her family moved to Dinwiddie County, since her Amelia County residence was no longer within the district that had elected her.

Scott once described herself as "a real conservative. Conservative first. Republican second." She became noted during her time as a delegate for her belief in limited government and free enterprise, and expressed her opposition to abortion and the Equal Rights Amendment. Scott limited the amounts she would allow people to contribute to her campaigns, fearing that otherwise she might become indebted to those who gave her money and would compromise her beliefs. Over her three terms in the House, Scott served on a number of committees, including Militia and Police, Counties Cities and Towns, Labor and Commerce, and Roads and Internal Navigation.

Redistricted out of her House of Delegates district again, Scott chose to run for the Virginia State Senate in 1979. She won the Republican nomination, and narrowly defeated the incumbent. She served only one four-year term, choosing not to run for reelection in 1983 when the boundaries of her Senate district changed. Scott later stated that she was not aware of any discrimination while serving in the Senate, even if it was present.

Following her retirement from elective office, Scott remained active in conservative causes and the local Republican Party. She also helped operate her family's lumber business. She stated that she felt obligated to continue her career in public service, as the electorate trusted her enough to elect her to office. She expressed support for the Tea Party movement. She was a Baptist.

The Library of Virginia named Scott one of the Virginia Women in History in 2013.

== Death ==
Scott died on March 28, 2019, aged 92.

== See also ==
- Sarah Lee Fain and Helen Timmons Henderson, first women elected to the Virginia Legislature, in 1923
