= Isaac C. Boyd =

American politician

Member of the Virginia House of Delegates from Russell County
- In office January 14, 1942 – January 14, 1948
- Preceded by: George A. Pruner
- Succeeded by: Roger D. Fraley
- In office January 11, 1928 – January 8, 1930
- Preceded by: William W. Bird
- Succeeded by: Joseph E. Duff

Member of the Virginia House of Delegates for Russell and Buchanan
- In office January 12, 1926 – January 11, 1928
- Preceded by: Helen Timmons Henderson
- Succeeded by: Helen Ruth Henderson

Personal details
- Born: Isaac Cleveland Boyd; November 3, 1884 Buchanan, Virginia, U.S.
- Died: January 8, 1969 (aged 84) Sarasota, Florida, U.S.
- Party: Democratic
- Spouse: Ethel Gertrude

Isaac Cleveland Boyd (November 3, 1884 – January 8, 1969) was a member of the Virginia House of Delegates.
