= Nellie Nugent Somerville =

American politician

- Born: Eleanor Nugent; September 25, 1863; Greenville, Mississippi, US
- Died: July 28, 1952 (aged 88); Ruleville, Mississippi, US
- Education: Martha Washington College
- Occupation: Politician
- Spouse: Robert Somerville (m. 1885; died in 1925)

Eleanor Nugent Somerville (September 25, 1863 – July 28, 1952) was the first woman elected to the Mississippi Legislature. Her daughter, Lucy Somerville Howorth, was soon elected to that body as well, and the two became the second mother-daughter pair elected to a state legislature in the United States, behind only Helen Timmons Henderson and Helen Ruth Henderson of Virginia.

== Life and career ==
Eleanor Nugent was born in Greenville, Mississippi, into the state's plantation aristocracy, in the middle of the American Civil War. She was the daughter of William Lewis Nugent and Eleanor Smith Nugent; her great-grandfather was Seth Lewis, second chief justice of the Mississippi Territory and organizer of its judicial system. Her father was in the Confederate army, and her grandfather was shot by Union Army troops who also burned their house. Her mother also soon died, as did her stepmother, and it was left to her maternal grandmother, S. Myra Cox Smith, to restore the family fortune during Reconstruction. Her father later married a third time. Nellie was born with a deformed hand, which she would often disguise under a handkerchief or glove; she became adept enough at hiding it that she could even win at croquet one-handed.

She attended Whitworth Female College, being described there as "too smart for them to teach", before graduating as valedictorian from Virginia's Martha Washington College in 1880 and returning to Greenville, where she tutored the children of a local banker for a time before marrying civil engineer Robert Somerville in 1885. The couple had four children, to whom she remained close. William Nugent invited her to read law in his office, but she declined, claiming instead that she needed to look after her grandmother.

Somerville, a devout Methodist who was active in church matters, became active in the Woman's Christian Temperance Union and the movement to gain women the right to vote, and in 1897 she was elected president of the state branch of the National American Woman Suffrage Association. She was also treasurer of the Southern Woman Suffrage Association. Until 1898 she was a member of the Hypatia Club in Greenville, an invitation-only women's association whose members would write and present for discussion their own papers; it is said to have been a matter of great regret for outsiders that they were not invited to meetings.

=== Political career ===
In 1922 Somerville ran for the Mississippi House of Representatives, winning one of the seats in the at-large district in the Democratic Party primary. Given the paucity of Republicans in state politics this was tantamount to election. During her term of office, she championed progressive causes and held the governor, Henry L. Whitfield, to his campaign pledge of appointing women to state boards. She also served as a delegate to the 1924 Democratic National Convention. Somerville won reelection in 1926, but her husband had died the previous year and she never truly recovered. Furthermore, during the Great Mississippi Flood of 1927, she refused, as a state representative, to evacuate her property, leading to an angry response from officials of the American Red Cross. They refused to accept her input, and she withdrew from her 1928 reelection campaign, disheartened. During her time in office she had been a champion of education, sponsoring the bill which established Delta State Teachers College. She also attempted to ban child labor in textile mills, but was less successful in these efforts. She chaired the committee on eleemosynary institutions, which gained in its prestige during her time in office. Generally, she compiled a more liberal record in office than her longtime colleague, Belle Kearney. She was noted as a keen observer of her fellow legislators, and it was considered noteworthy when a bill which she had championed failed in its passage. In 1928 she broke ranks with her party and supported Herbert Hoover, a "dry", over the "wet" Al Smith in the race for president.

Somerville also assisted in reorganizing the state mental hospital during her career. In her later years she moved between Cleveland, Mississippi and Monteagle, Tennessee, where she had purchased a cottage at the Methodist retreat in the 1890s. A product of her time and place, she became increasingly more conservative as she grew older; she opposed the New Deal, was against pacifism, supported the poll tax, and rejected federal child labor laws, and by 1948 was an active States' Rights Democrat. She was known as a shrewd businesswoman, who began investing in real estate after her husband's death; over the rest of her life she took what had been a small inheritance and grew it substantially, to the point that her banker considered her the most gifted investor he had ever known. Politically, she has been described as "a major liberalizing force in Mississippi for forty years." She self-identified as a Southerner for much of her life, once claiming that she had not felt like an American until visiting Massachusetts and standing upon Plymouth Rock, after World War I. She died of cancer in Ruleville. Her papers are in the Harvard University Library. She was inducted into the Mississippi Hall of Fame in 1981, and her portrait currently hangs in the Old Mississippi State Capitol.

Somerville objected to her daughter Lucy's 1928 marriage to Joe Howorth, concerned that she would be giving up on her career, but the two did not become estranged. Lucy went on to win election to the Mississippi House of Representatives in her own right in 1932, but not to her mother's old seat.
