= Helen Ruth Henderson =

American schoolteacher and politician

Member of the Virginia House of Delegates for Russell and Buchanan
- In office January 11, 1928 – January 8, 1930
- Preceded by: Isaac C. Boyd
- Succeeded by: French M. Clevinger

Personal details
- Born: Helen Ruth Henderson; November 9, 1898 Jefferson City, Tennessee, U.S.
- Died: February 20, 1982 (aged 83) Knoxville, Tennessee, U.S.
- Party: Democratic
- Education: Virginia Intermont College; Westhampton College; Columbia University

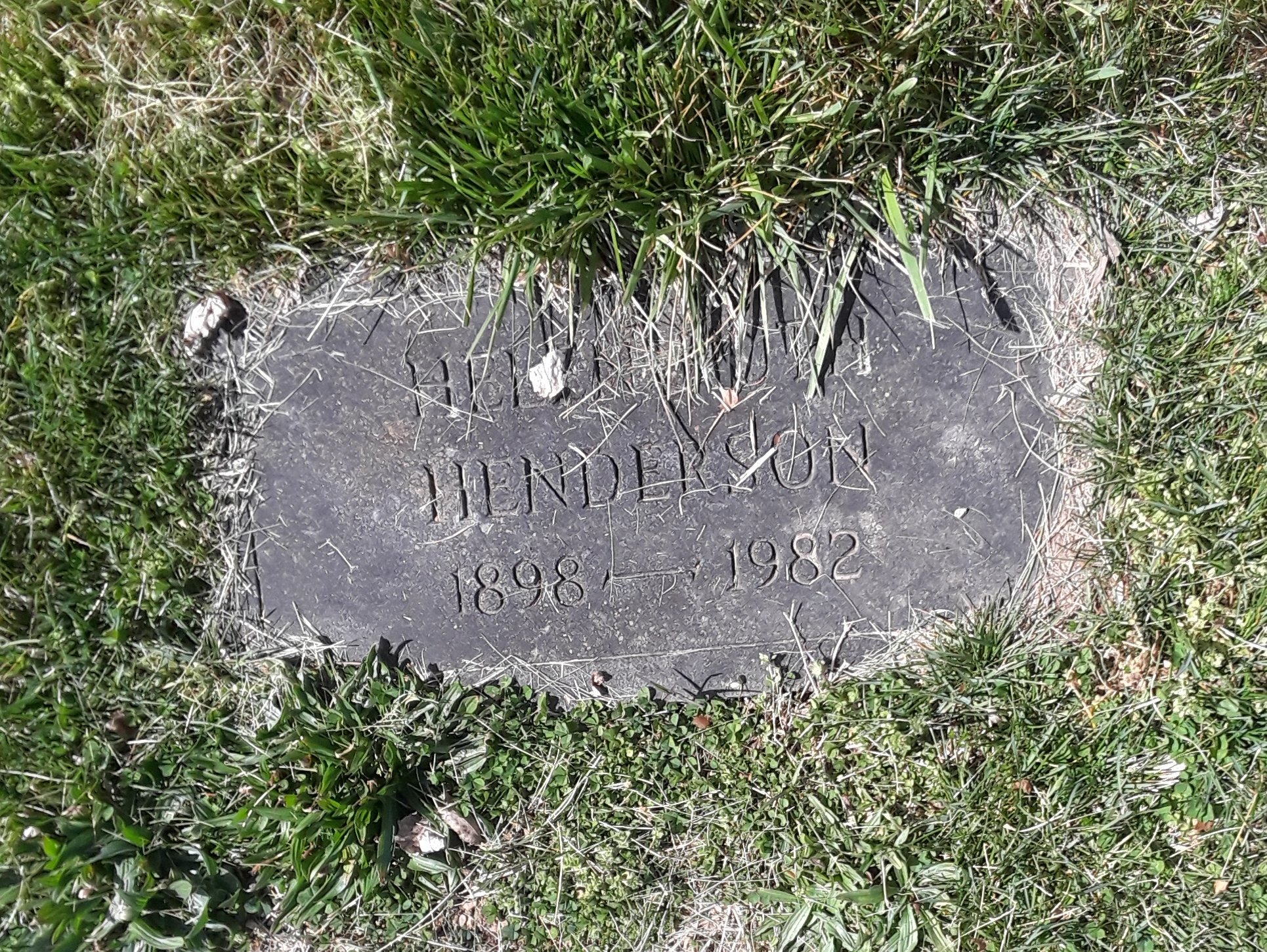
Henderson's grave in Westview Cemetery

Helen Ruth Henderson (November 9, 1898 – February 20, 1982) was a Virginia schoolteacher and politician. The daughter of Helen Timmons Henderson, she was elected to her mother's old seat in the Virginia House of Delegates, entering in 1928 and serving one term. This made the two the first mother-daughter pair to serve in the Virginia General Assembly and, indeed, in any state legislature; they were followed soon after by Nellie Nugent Somerville and Lucy Somerville Howorth of Mississippi.

== Biography ==
Henderson was born in Jefferson City, Tennessee, and moved with her family to Virginia in 1907; when her parents moved to Buchanan County, she and her brother came along as well, though locals advised against it. She was educated at Virginia Intermont College and Westhampton College, and later gained a PhD from Columbia University; there her dissertation was on the subject of educational challenges facing Buchanan County. It was published in 1937 as A curriculum study of a mountain district. She began her teaching career in a one-room schoolhouse, and would go on to head the mission school founded by her mother.

Henderson served as a Democrat in the Virginia House of Delegates for a single two-year term, leaving in 1930. She was one of four women serving in the legislature during her tenure. The other three were Sallie C. Booker, Nancy Melvina Caldwell, and Sarah Lee Fain; Fain had previously served alongside her mother. Though some sources claim that she was the second woman elected to the General Assembly, she was in fact the fifth. Upon leaving office she joined the Virginia Department of Education. There she spent thirteen years, rising from assistant supervisor to supervisor of elementary education, in which role she spearheaded the establishment of nurseries in public schools to support women working in war plants during World War II. She later became executive secretary of the International Division of the Girl Scouts of the USA. She was a member of the Daughters of the American Revolution, and was appointed by the governor of Virginia to work with the National Advisory Council on Illiteracy.

Henderson died in Knoxville, Tennessee. She is buried at Westview Cemetery in Jefferson City.
