= Louis Isaac Jaffe =

American journalist (1888–1950)

- Born: February 22, 1888; Detroit, Michigan, U.S.
- Died: March 12, 1950 (aged 62); Norfolk, Virginia
- Burial place: Cedar Grove Cemetery, Norfolk, Norfolk City, Virginia
- Education: A.B., Trinity College
- Occupations: Journalist; Editorial page editor
- Employer: The Virginian-Pilot
- Known for: 1929 Pulitzer prize for editorial writing
- Spouse(s): Margaret Stewart Davis (1920–1939); Alice Cohn Rice (1942–1950)
- Children: 3
- Parent(s): Phillip and Lotta (Kahn) Jaffe

Louis Isaac Jaffe (February 22, 1888 – March 12, 1950) was a Lithuanian-American Pulitzer prize-winning journalist and former director of the American Red Cross News Service, in Paris, for the European bureau. He served for over three decades, and serving as the editorial page editor of the newspaper, Virginian-Pilot of Norfolk, Virginia (1919– 1950).

During his 31-year career with the Pilot, Jaffe became a progressive force in state and local politics and won national recognition for his campaign defending civil rights, attacking the Ku Klux Klan and urging state action against lynching. Jaffe was awarded the Pulitzer Prize for Editorial Writing in 1929 for "An Unspeakable Act of Savagery," condemning the 1928 lynching of Robert Powell, a 24-year-old black man, in Houston, Texas.

== Background and education ==
Jaffe was born in Detroit, Michigan, to parents, Phillip and Lotta (Kahn) Jaffe. He spent his early life in Durham, North Carolina; his family moved there when he was seven years old. His parents, who were orthodox Jewish immigrants from Lithuania, were shopkeepers.

Jaffe attended Durham High School and earned his bachelor's (A.B.) degree at Trinity College, the forerunner of Duke University, in 1911. He was a member of Phi Beta Kappa. During college, he worked as a correspondent for North Carolina and Virginia newspapers and as a student-instructor.

== Career ==
After graduation from Trinity, Jaffe began his career as a staff member, for just six weeks, with the Durham Sun, before joining the Richmond Times-Dispatch. While at the Times-Dispatch, he worked as a political writer and as an assistant city editor, leaving, at the age of 29, to join the military during World War I.

Jaffe enlisted in United States Army, and trained at a first officers training camp, then serving in France, with the American Expeditionary Forces (1918–1919). Jaffe spent three months on an inspection trip to the Balkan Peninsula, before serving as the director the American Red Cross News Service, headquartered in Paris. Following his military service, in 1919, Jaffe accepted an offer to become editor of the Virginian-Pilot.

During his thirty-one year career with the Virginian, Jaffe became a progressive force in state and local politics in Virginia, winning national recognition for his campaign for civil rights and against lynching, as well as the 1929 Pulitzer prize. As recently as 2019, Jaffe's work to call attention to the victims of lynching, was remembered in The Virginian-Pilot. In an article published by the editorial board, on October 25, "Editorial: From the past, condemnation of lynching," they wrote:

"MORE THAN 4,000 people were lynched in the United States between 1882 and 1968, nearly all of whom were African American men, women and children. Those are the victims which records can confirm; the number is likely quite higher. Stopping that barbaric practice was the determined goal of Louis Isaac Jaffe, who in 1928 was editor of the Norfolk Virginian Pilot."

— Editorial board, The Virginian-Pilot, Editorial: From the past, a condemnation of lynching

The editorial board reprinted Jaffe's Pulitzer prize-winning story, "An Unspeakable Act of Savagery," saying that it was "for those who need a reminder of a history that no one – including the president of the United States – should whitewash," an obvious reference to Donald Trump.

Jaffe's work and determination played an important role in the adoption of an antilynching law, in 1928 by the Virginia General Assembly, declaring lynching a state crime. In 2019, Senate Joint Resolution No. 297 was passed by the state acknowledging and apologizing for the state's "acceptance of lynching within the Commonwealth."

In 1930, the editorial jury wanted to award Jaffe a second Pulitzer, for his article, "Not Heresy but Hunger," however, the rules were not clear on awarding the prize to the same individual, working with the same newspaper, two years in succession.

== Personal ==
Jaffe married Margaret Stewart Davis, in 1920. They had one son, Christopher, born in 1922; they divorced in 1939. He married again in 1942, to Alice Cohn Rice, They had a son, Louis Isaac Jr., born in 1946, and another child, Lewis Lawson, who died as an infant. Louis Isaac Jaffe died of a coronary condition, at the Norfolk General Hospital, in Norfolk, Virginia. Jaffe is buried at Cedar Grove Cemetery, Norfolk, Norfolk city, Virginia.

Alexander Leidholt published Jaffe's biography in 2002. A collection of Jaffe's papers are preserved at the Albert and Shirley Small Special Collections Library at the University of Virginia.
