= Belle Kearney =

American politician

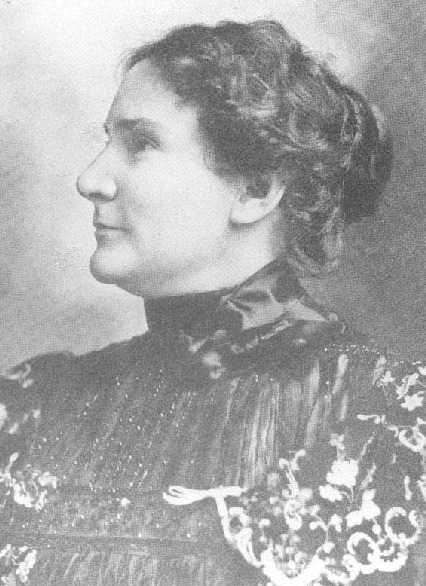

Member of the Mississippi Senate from the 18th district
- In office 1924–1932

Personal details
- Born: March 6, 1863 Flora, Mississippi
- Died: February 27, 1939 (aged 75) Jackson, Mississippi
- Party: Democratic

A slaveholder's daughter

Carrie Belle Kearney (March 6, 1863 – February 27, 1939) was an American temperance reformer, suffragist, teacher, white supremacist, and the first woman elected to the Mississippi State Senate. A Democrat, she served in the state senate in 1924 and 1926. She lived in Flora, Mississippi, and represented Madison County.

== Early life ==
Kearney was born on her family's plantation in Flora, Mississippi. Her father, Walter Guston Kearney, was a slave-owning planter who suffered significant financial losses after the Civil War.

Belle Kearney attended Canton Young Ladies' Academy, but was forced to leave due to the cost of tuition. She educated herself, and opened a private school in a spare bedroom of the plantation house. She later began teaching in the public school system.

== Activism, beliefs and works ==
Kearney was a Methodist, and a member of the Woman's Christian Temperance Union. She was also active in the American suffrage movement, and was hired as a speaker and lobbyist by the National American Woman Suffrage Association. In this role, she traveled throughout the United States, Canada, and Europe, and was a respected orator.

Kearney was a white supremacist, and used her public speaking events to advocate her racial views. While delivering an address at the National American Woman Suffrage Association Convention in 1903, she said that women's suffrage would bring about "immediate and durable white supremacy, honestly attained".

Kearney authored two novels: A Slaveholder's Daughter (1900), and Conqueror or Conquered: Or, the Sex Challenge Answered (1921). She also edited Mama Flower (1918).

== Elected office ==
In 1922, Kearney ran unsuccessfully for the office of U.S. Senator from Mississippi.

In 1924, she was elected to the Mississippi State Senate as a Democrat representing Madison County, the first woman in Mississippi to hold that office.

== Death ==
Kearney never married and had no children. She spent her last years on the family plantation in Flora, and died of cancer in 1939 at the home of a friend in Jackson. She was buried in Kearney Cemetery near the family plantation.

== See also ==
- Nellie Nugent Somerville, first woman elected to the Mississippi Legislature, elected to the Mississippi House of Representatives in 1924.
