= Sarah Lee Fain =

American politician

Member of the Virginia House of Delegates from Norfolk City
- In office January 9, 1924 – January 8, 1930
- Succeeded by: Colgate Darden

Personal details
- Born: Sarah Lee Odend'hal; November 23, 1888 Norfolk, Virginia, U.S.
- Died: July 20, 1962 (aged 73) San Marino, California, U.S.
- Party: Democratic
- Spouse: Walter Colquitt Fain
- Education: University of Virginia

Sarah Lee Odend'hal Fain (November 23, 1888 – July 20, 1962) was a Virginia schoolteacher and Democratic politician who became one of the earliest female members of the Virginia General Assembly and later assisted with New Deal reforms in Washington, D.C., North Carolina, Texas and California. In 1923, Fain and fellow schoolteacher Helen Timmons Henderson became the first two women elected to the Virginia House of Delegates.

== Early life and education ==
Born in Norfolk, Virginia, Sarah Lee Odend'hal was educated locally first at Leache-Wood Seminary (founded by Irene Leache (1839–1900) and Anna Cogswell Wood (1850–1940)). She graduated from Hemmingway High School in 1907.

== Virginia career ==
Odend'hal then embarked on a teaching career, spending twelve years in the city's public schools as both a teacher and administrator, while taking summer courses through the University of Virginia. The University did not directly offer diplomas to women, but the work she did in her summer courses provided her with the equivalent of an undergraduate degree in education and administration.

Odend'hal married Army officer and architect Walter Colquitt Fain on September 8, 1917, and began a career in civic life shortly thereafter. Since few married women at the time continued their schoolteaching jobs, she turned her attention to her husband's construction firm, becoming its secretary and treasurer. She also began her public life, becoming active in organizations including the United Daughters of the Confederacy, the Daughters of the American Revolution, and the local Episcopal Church. Fain's first volunteer activity came when she supported the American Red Cross and sold Liberty bonds to support the American effort in World War I.

When the Nineteenth Amendment to the United States Constitution was ratified in 1920, Fain joined the local branch of the League of Women Voters and became active in local Democratic Party politics, although she had not previously been particularly known as a suffragist nor had she joined the local branch of the Equal Suffrage League. Her success at convincing Norfolk's female voters to re-elect U.S. Senator Claude A. Swanson in 1922 led Fain's friends to urge her to run for a seat in Virginia's House of Delegates. Though initially reluctant, she soon decided to run; her husband served as her campaign manager and treasurer. Fain also gained the support of suffragists, including Pauline Forstall Colclough Adams, the wife of a Norfolk physician and who had become the second woman to practice law in Norfolk as well as one of 13 picketers arrested in 1917 for flaunting banners in front of President Woodrow Wilson's reviewing stand during a parade.

Upon her arrival in Richmond, Fain was treated as something of a novelty, but disappointed some because she focused on the maritime and education issues important to her constituents, rather than a feminist agenda (as her detractors feared). On January 8 Fain seconded the nomination of Richard L. Brewer, Jr. as Speaker of the Virginia House; she received over a minute of applause and cheers when recognized from the floor, and upon his election Fain became the delegate chosen to formally introduce Brewer to party members. She also became one of three delegates chosen to formally introduce Governor E. Lee Trinkle to the House, and also received the honor of hers being the first bill put into the hopper for the session.

In 1925 Fain became the first female legislator in the Southern United States to win reelection, and she won a third term in 1927. In her last session she chaired the Committee on Schools and Colleges, of which she had been a member from her first term. During this session she served with three other women, Sallie C. Booker, Nancy Melvina Caldwell, and Helen Ruth Henderson; the latter, elected in 1927, was the daughter of her former colleague.

Rather than seek a fourth term in 1929, Fain chose to run for a seat in the United States House of Representatives, but she was unsuccessful. Between sessions she served as secretary, treasurer, and chief executive of her husband's furniture factory, a role which she had discharged since 1924.

== Federal service and later years ==
In 1931 Fain and her husband moved to Washington, D.C., where she received a number of appointments supporting New Deal programs; she worked for the National Emergency Council, and served as the first chief of the United States Information Service, in whose creation she assisted. She held other federal positions in North Carolina and Texas before moving to San Marino, California in 1938.

Fain did not run for public office again, but returned to Norfolk to support Meeta B. Meyers in 1951, when the latter ran unsuccessfully for Fain's former seat. Otherwise she remained in California until her death. The City of Norfolk would not elect another woman to the General Assembly until Evelyn Momsen Hailey in 1973.

== Death and legacy ==
Fain died on July 20, 1962, survived by her husband. Both are buried in Norfolk's Elmwood Cemetery. The Library of Virginia honored Fain as one of the first group of Virginia Women in History in 2000. In 2018 the Virginia Capitol Foundation announced that Fain's name would be on the Virginia Women's Monument's glass Wall of Honor.

== See also ==
- Eva Mae Fleming Scott, the first woman elected to the Virginia State Senate, in 1979
