= Helen Timmons Henderson =

American politician

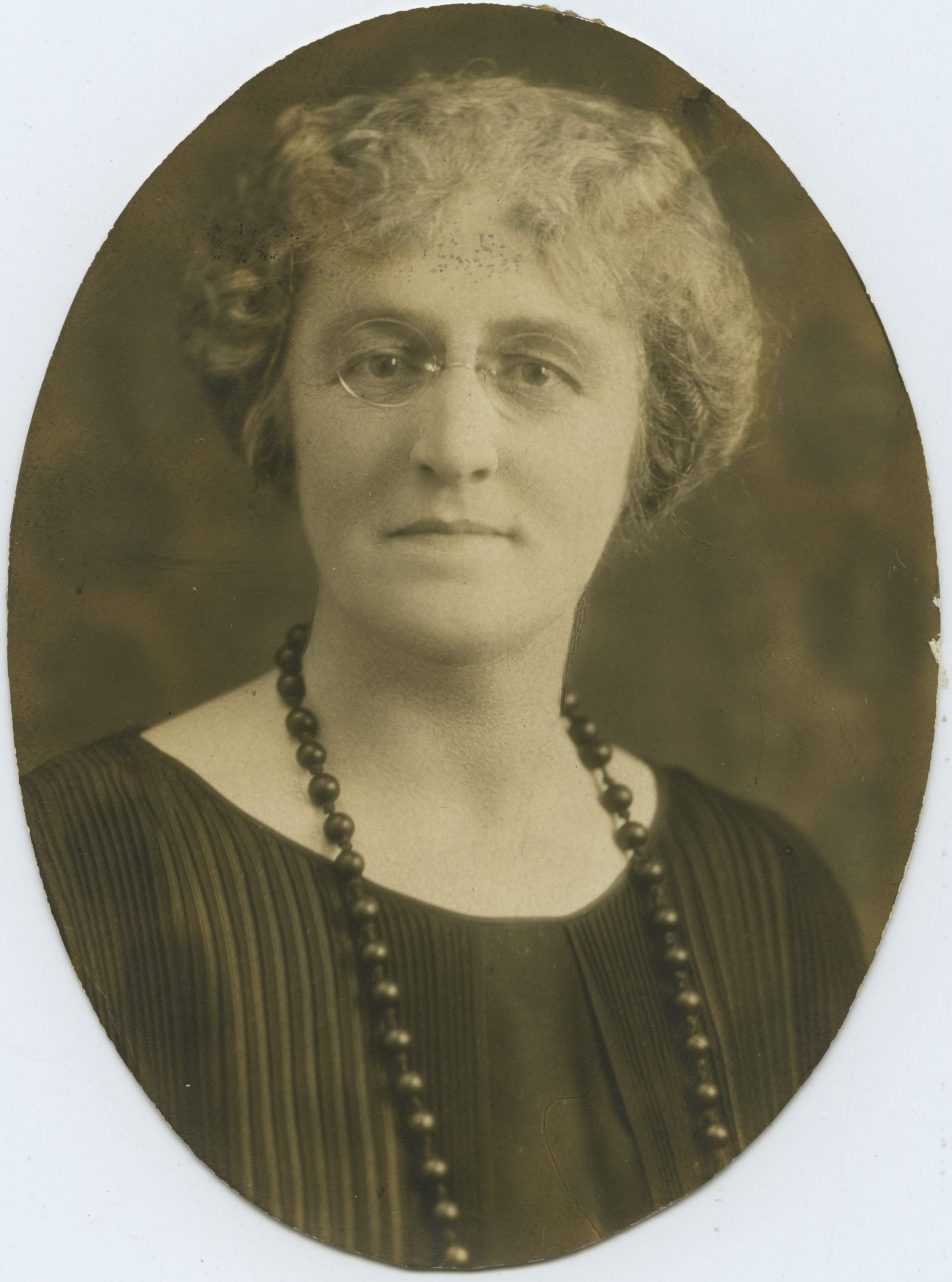

Member of the Virginia House of Delegates for Russell and Buchanan
- In office January 9, 1924 – July 12, 1925
- Preceded by: John White Stuart; John H. Stinson
- Succeeded by: Isaac C. Boyd

Personal details
- Born: Helen Timmons; May 23, 1877 Cass, Missouri, U.S.
- Died: July 12, 1925 (aged 48) Jefferson, Tennessee, U.S.
- Party: Democratic
- Spouse: Robert Anderson Henderson
- Education: Carson–Newman College

Helen Timmons Henderson (May 23, 1877 – July 12, 1925) was a schoolteacher and politician from Virginia. She was the first woman ever to be nominated for the Virginia House of Delegates; with Sarah Lee Fain, in 1923, she was one of the first two women elected to that body, and to the Virginia General Assembly as a whole.

== Life and career ==
Helen Timmons was born on May 23, 1877 in Cass County, Missouri, where her parents were visiting, and grew up in Jefferson County, Tennessee. She attended Carson–Newman College in Jefferson City, Tennessee, where she studied to become a schoolteacher; one of her professors there was Robert Anderson Henderson, whom she would later marry. Upon her marriage she moved with her husband to Buchanan County, Virginia; there she was shocked by the limited educational opportunities available in southwest Virginia, and began efforts to correct the deficit. These culminated in the foundation of the Baptist Mountain School in Council, in 1911, at which organization she served as assistant principal; her husband was the principal. The leadership qualities she evinced in her role convinced a group of local Democratic Party leaders to suggest, in 1923, that she run for a seat in the Virginia House of Delegates. She acquiesced, and proved to be not only an excellent campaigner, but a fine public speaker as well; unusually for the time, she drove her own car between campaign stops, and would sometimes speak at two in the same day. Henderson won election that November by a margin of over 400 votes. The town of Council was at the time so remote that it took two days for news of her election to trickle in.

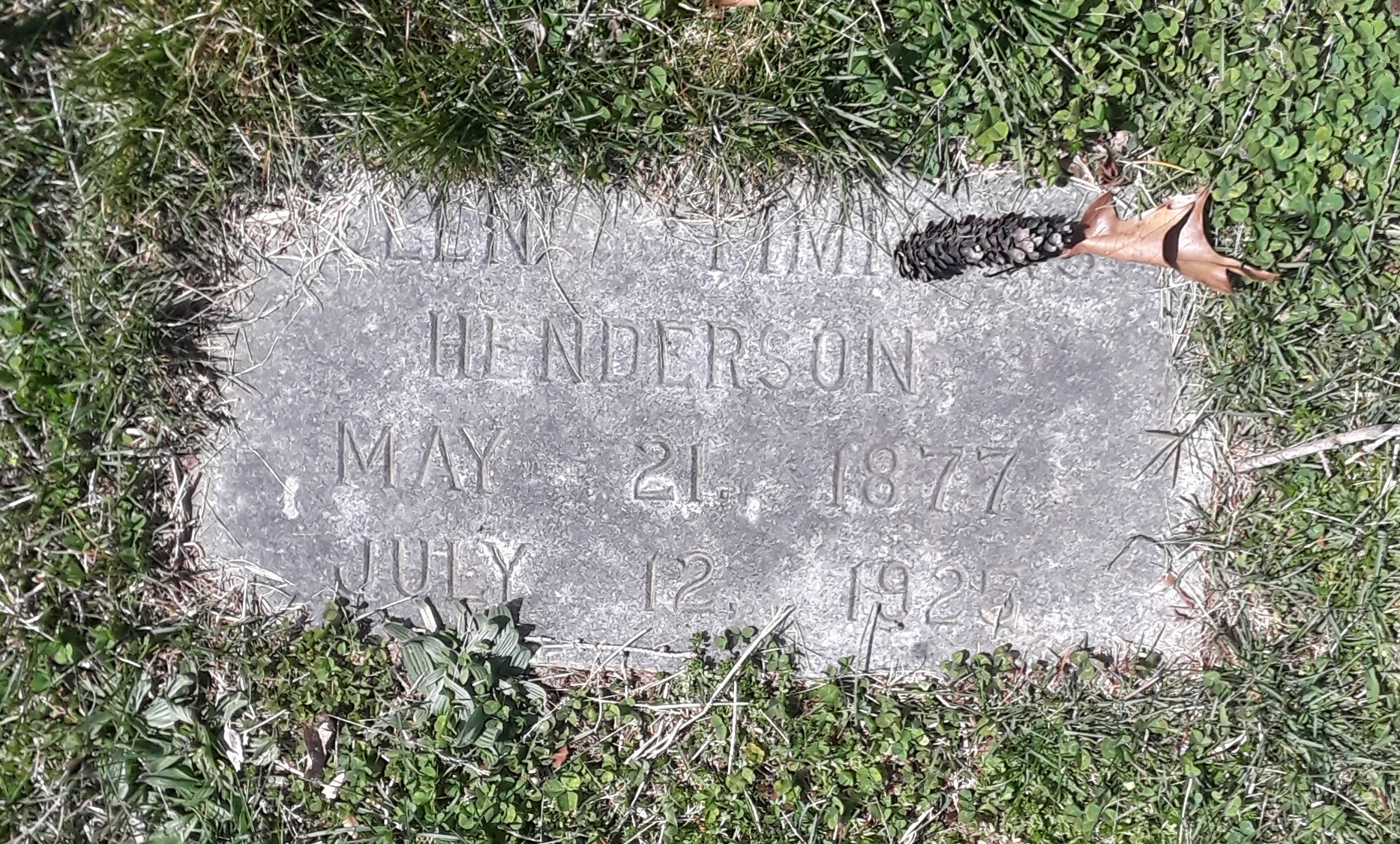
Henderson's grave marker in Westview Cemetery

The Richmond Times-Dispatch described Henderson's opposition as coming "from some independent Democrats, Republicans, and wets", the last referring to opponents of Prohibition. Of her role in Richmond, Henderson said: "I'm not in the Legislature for publicity. It's simply a question of public service with me, and a duty I owe to the people back in those counties which have elected me."

While in the General Assembly Henderson gained a reputation as an advocate for the interests of southwestern Virginia, calling for more funding for roads and schools. She was the first woman to preside over the Assembly, and sat on four Committees: Roads and Internal Navigation; Counties, Cities, and Towns; Moral and Social Welfare; and Executive Expenditures. Her health, however, had begun to fail in the spring of 1925, and she returned to her parents' home in Jefferson City; she died there in July, without the chance to run for reelection, although she had been unanimously renominated. At Henderson's death, governor E. Lee Trinkle praised her "many virtues, clear vision and noble aspirations", and ordered flags at the capitol building to be flown at half-staff in her honor. Henderson is buried at Westview Cemetery in Jefferson City.

Henderson's daughter Helen Ruth would follow in her mother's footsteps, both as a schoolteacher and as a member of the Virginia House of Delegates, to which body she was first elected in 1927; in the 1928 session she was one of four women serving in the House. She was the first woman to succeed her mother in the Virginia legislature, and the two were the first mother-daughter pair elected to any state legislature in the United States, followed soon after by Nellie Nugent Somerville and Lucy Somerville Howorth of Mississippi. With her husband Henderson also had a son, Robert Ashby Henderson.

== Honors ==
The House of Delegates adopted the following resolution in memory of Helen Henderson:

WHEREAS, In the providence and inscrutable wisdom of God, it was seen proper to remove from active public life in this Common-wealth and from her seat in this body Helen T. Henderson, who was taken to her final reward on the 12th day of July, 1925, and,

WHEREAS, It seems fitting to this House of Delegates that some testimonial to the great worth of this gentle woman should be spread as a memorial on the records of this body, and,

WHEREAS, No member of this lower branch of the General Assembly ever dignified with loftier ideals, with purer heart or with braver spirit a seat in this Assembly, now,

THEREFORE, Be it resolved by this body that the House go on permanent record in loving testimony to the many virtues, clear vision and noble aspirations of Helen T. Henderson, who dignified with her presence and purified with her lofty spirit this branch of the Legislature, which now goes on record in its acknowledgment of its respect for and obligation to her memory.

Agreed to by House of Delegates, February 3rd, 1926.

A historical marker honoring Henderson in Buchanan County was erected in 2010 by the Virginia Department of Historic Resources. A portion of Virginia Route 80 is named the "Helen Henderson Highway" in her honor, and she was inducted in 2013 into the Southwest Virginia Walk of Fame, located at the Southwest Virginia Museum Historical State Park in Big Stone Gap.

== See also ==
- Eva Mae Fleming Scott, the first woman elected to the Virginia State Senate, in 1979
