= List of Virginia suffragists =

This is a list of Virginia suffragists, suffrage groups and others associated with the cause of women's suffrage in Virginia.

== Groups ==
- Bedford Equal Suffrage League.
- Colored Women's Voting Club in Roanoke.
- Equal Suffrage League of Fredericksburg.
- Equal Suffrage League of Highland Springs.
- Equal Suffrage League of Lynchburg.
- Equal Suffrage League of Norfolk.
- Equal Suffrage League of Williamsburg.
- Equal Suffrage League of Virginia, formed in 1909.
- Men's Equal Suffrage League of Virginia, formed in 1912.
- Newport News Equal Suffrage League.
- Virginia Beach National Woman's Party.
- Virginia State Federation of Colored Women's Clubs, created in 1907.
- Virginia State Woman Suffrage Association.
- Virginia Suffrage Association (formerly Virginia Suffrage Society) formed in 1893.
- Virginia Branch of the Congressional Union for Woman Suffrage formed in 1915.

== Suffragists ==
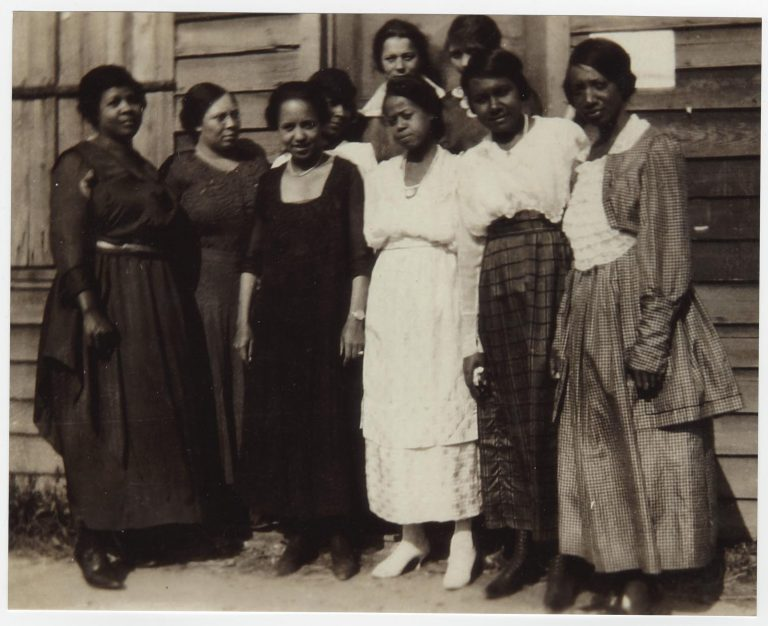
Virginia Normal and Industrial Institute faculty members who registered to vote in 1920

- Pauline Adams (Norfolk).
- Lillie Barbour.
- Janie Porter Barrett (Hampton).
- Kate Waller Barrett (Alexandria).
- Anna Whitehead Bodeker – co-founder and inaugural president of Virginia State Woman Suffrage Association, the first suffrage association in Virginia.
- Kate Langley Bosher (Richmond).
- Rosa Dixon Bowser (Richmond).
- Martha Haines Butt.
- Anne Atkinson Burmeister Chamberlayne
- Adèle Clark (Richmond).
- Mary Ellen Pollard Clarke
- Elizabeth Cooke (Norfolk).
- Edith Clark Cowles (Richmond).
- Anne Clay Crenshaw (Richmond).
- Blanche Culpeper
- Janet Stuart Oldershaw Durham
- Janetta R. FitzHugh (Fredericksburg).
- Ellen Glasgow (Richmond).
- Nora Houston (Richmond).
- Maude Jamison (Norfolk).
- Julia S. Jennings
- Eugenia Jobson.
- Maria I. Johnston (Fredericksburg).
- Mary Johnston (Richmond).
- Emma Lee Kelley
- Fannie Bayly King.
- Orra Henderson Moore Gray Langhorn (Lynchburg).
- Elizabeth Van Lew
- Elizabeth Langhorne Lewis
- Mary Morris Hall Lockwood
- Lucy Randolph Mason (Richmond).
- Nell Mercer (Norfolk).
- Sophie G. Meredith (Richmond).
- Faith W. Morgan.
- Mary-Cooke Branch Munford (Richmond).
- Josephine Mathews Norcom
- Elizabeth Lewis Otey
- Rosewell Page.
- Millie Lawson Bethell Paxton (Roanoke).
- Mary Elizabeth Pidgeon.
- Mary Bell Perkins
- Caroline F. Putnam – abolitionist, teacher, and president of the Virginia State Woman Suffrage Association
- Agnes Dillon Randolph (Richmond).
- Eudora Ramsay Richardson.
- Ralza M. Manly
- Sally Nelson Robins (Richmond).
- Ellen Robinson.
- Ora Brown Stokes.
- Alice Overbey Taylor.
- Ida Mae Thompson (Richmond).
- Clayton Torrence.
- Jessie Fremont Easton Townsend (Norfolk).
- Lyon G. Tyler (Williamsburg).
- Lila Meade Valentine (Richmond).
- Maggie L. Walker (Richmond).
- Roberta Wellford
- Annie Barna Whitner
- Sarah Harvie Wormeley.
- Eugenie Macon Yancey (Bedford).
- Louise Collier Willcox (1865–1929) – honorary vice-president of the Virginia Equal Suffrage League.

=== Politicians supporting women's suffrage ===
- Richard Lewis Brewer, Jr.
- Charles Carlin (originally opposed)
- Howard T. Colvin.
- Howard Cecil Gilmer.
- Thomas Lomax Hunter.
- Allan Jones.
- Wyndham R. Mayo (Norfolk).
- Hill Montague (Richmond).
- John Garland Pollard
- John R. Saunders
- Elbert Lee Trinkle
- John C. Underwood
- Junius E. West
- Westel Willoughby
- Emma Howard Wight.

== Places ==
- Occoquan Workhouse.
- Three Hills.

== Publications ==
- The Virginia Suffrage News, published monthly starting in 1914. Managed by Alice Overbey Taylor.

== Suffragists who campaigned in Virginia ==
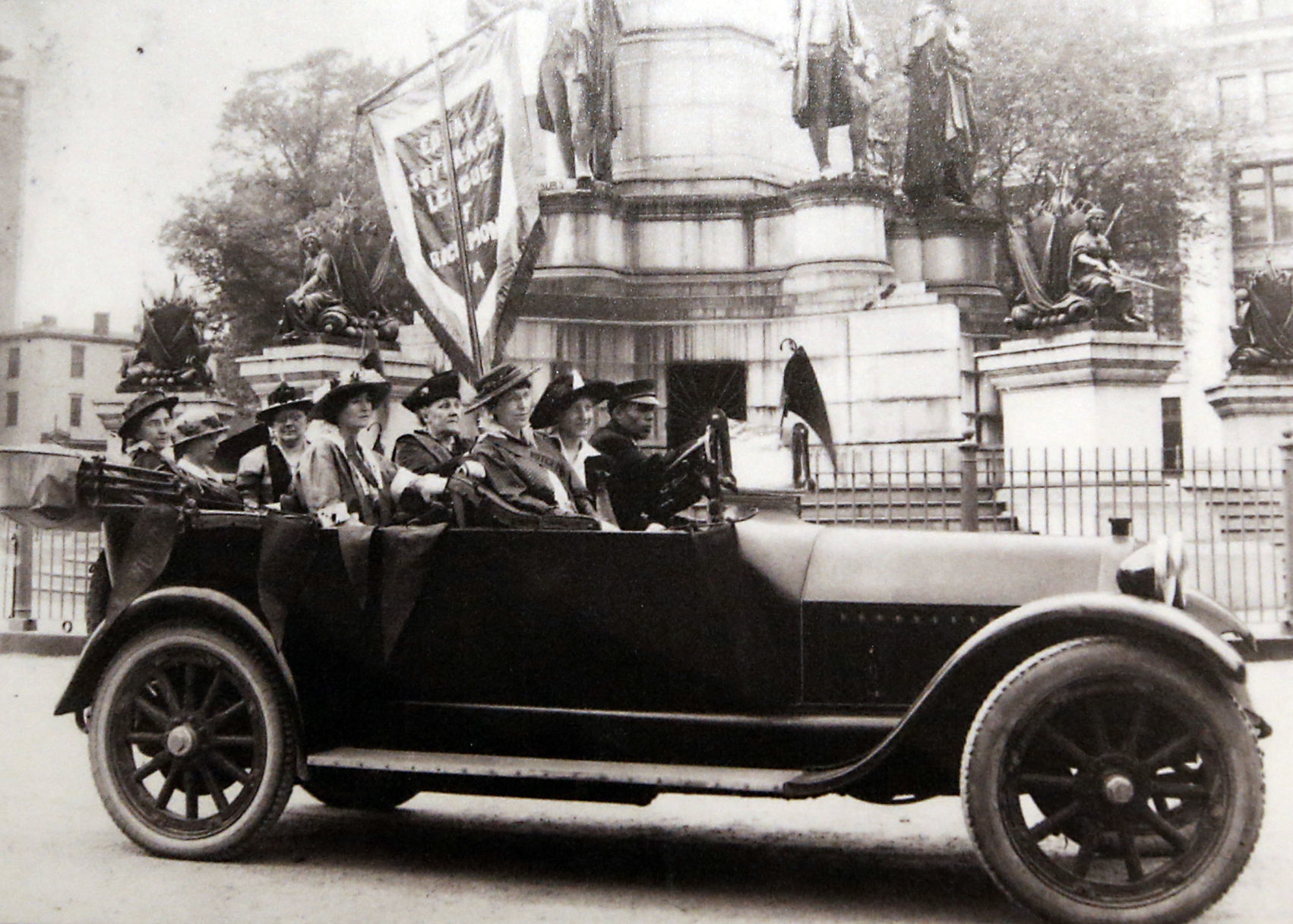
National Woman's Party suffragists driving through Richmond's Capitol Square

- Susan B. Anthony.
- William Jennings Bryan.
- Carrie Chapman Catt.
- Pauline Wright Davis.
- Margaret Foley.
- Matilda Joslyn Gage.
- Joy Montgomery Higgins.
- Josephine Miller.
- Mabel Vernon.
- Emma Howard Wight.
- Elizabeth Upham Yates.

== Anti-suffragists in Virginia ==
- Maria Blair (Richmond).
- Jane M. Rutherford.
- Molly Elliot Seawell
- Catherine Coles Valentine
- Mary Mason Anderson Williams
- Margaret Wilmer

Politicians

- Harry Flood Byrd
- Robert Franklin Leedy.

Groups

- Virginia Association Opposed to Woman Suffrage (VAOWS), formed in 1912.

== See also ==
- Timeline of women's suffrage in Virginia
- Women's suffrage in Virginia
- Women's suffrage in the United States
