= Jessie Fremont Easton Townsend =

American suffragist

- Born: Jessie Fremont Easton; July 2, 1861; Covington, Kentucky
- Died: September 24, 1941 (aged 80); Norfolk, Virginia
- Occupation: Suffragist

Jessie Fremont Easton Townsend (1861 – 1941) was an American suffragist. She was active in the Equal Suffrage League of Virginia and was an early member of the Norfolk branch of the organization.

== Biography ==
Townsend née Easton was born on July 2, 1861, in Covington, Kentucky. In 1882 she married Charles Edwin Townsend with whom she had four children. The couple settled in Norfolk, Virginia, in the 1890s. Townsend was active in Norfolk women's clubs including the Woman's Christian Temperance Union and the Council of Jewish Women.

Townsend was a member of the Norfolk Equal Suffrage League, a branch of the Equal Suffrage League of Virginia. In 1911 Townsend was elected treasurer. In 1913 she marched along with other Virginians in the Woman Suffrage Procession on March 3. The same year Townsend became president of the Norfolk Equal Suffrage League and for several years served as Virginia delegate to the national conventions of the National American Woman Suffrage Association. Despite Townsend participation in the Woman Suffrage Procession she felt that women should not be demonstrating in the streets with picket signs. Under her leadership the Norfolk Equal Suffrage League deliberately did not have a strong public presence.

By 1916 Townsend was a vice president of the Equal Suffrage League of Virginia and was a friend and ally the league's president, Lila Meade Valentine.

After the passage of the Nineteenth Amendment in 1920 Townsend attended the final meeting of the Equal Suffrage League of Virginia on November 9, and on November 10 attended the first meeting of the successor organization, the Virginia League of Women Voters. In 1936 she assisted Ida Mae Thompson's WPA project to collect historic Virginia suffrage materials. Townsend collected personal histories from former members of the Norfolk Equal Suffrage League and sent along the records she had from the Norfolk Equal Suffrage League as well as her personal correspondence with Lila Meade Valentine.

Townsend died on September 24, 1941, in Norfolk.
