= Edmund Archer (artist) =

American painter (1904–1986)

- Photo of Edmund Archer from the Times Dispatch (Richmond, Virginia) 1 January 1939.
- Born: Edmund Minor Archer; September 28, 1904; Richmond, Virginia, US
- Died: July 13, 1986 (aged 81); Richmond, Virginia, US
- Resting place: Hollywood Cemetery (Richmond, Virginia)
- Known for: Artist

Edmund Archer (1904–1986) was an American artist best known for his portraits of African Americans. He was born in Richmond, Virginia, to parents who were both culturally and socially prominent in that city. Having taken an early interest in painting, he took art classes continually from childhood into his adult years. His long career included periods spent in Richmond, Paris, New York, and Washington, D.C. In addition to painting, he served as an assistant curator at the Whitney Museum of American Art and an instructor at the Corcoran School of Art. His portrait style tended toward a poster-like flatness early in his career and later toward a more traditional modeled style. He painted with a high degree of realism throughout his career and rarely experimented with any degree of abstraction. Galleries and museums gave him frequent exhibitions and both individual and institutional collectors provided him with income from sales. In 1938, a critic said he was then considered to be "one of the best of the young artists in the United States". A few months later, another critic credited his success to hard work: "Edmund Minor Archer has had advantages. His success story is no Horatio Alger tale. It is a story of an earnest and deeply talented artist who has worked and studied in humility and devotion, and has early reached the top, hard step by hard step".

== Early life and education ==
Archer was born in Richmond on 28 September 1904. He attended the Chamberlayne School for Boys and graduated in 1916. Between 1913 and 1916, he took art classes taught by two local artists, Adèle Clark and Nora Houston, at the Richmond Art Club. Houston later recalled that "his construction was good from his fourteenth year, his portrait studies having bones and muscles, and reflecting a distaste for the trite prettiness so admired by earlier generations". In the summer of 1916, he traveled to Cape Cod to attend Charles Hawthorne's art school. In 1918, he began full-time study at a new school established by Houston and Clark. That year, he won first prize in a local bond drive poster contest, and the next year a painting of his received honorable mention in an exhibition of the school's students. Leaving the school run by Houston and Clark in 1922, he studied for two terms at the University of Virginia and then traveled to New York to study at the Art Students League under Kenneth Hayes Miller and Allen Tucker. Having both talent and preference for depicting the human figure, he obtained his first portrait commission in 1924 and at this time the Art Students League bought a figure study of his called "Reclining Nude" for its permanent collection. The following year the League bought another painting, this one, called "The Three Graces", showing three heads. During 1926 and 1927, he traveled in Europe, spending time in Rome and Arezzo, studying Renaissance artists, and in Paris, working at the Académie Colarossi and in a studio he rented.

== Career in art ==
(1) Edmund Archer, Buying Flowers, 1930, oil on canvas, 31 x 26 1/16 inches

(2) Edmund Archer, Organdy Collar, 1936, oil on canvas, 19 x 16 inches

(3) Edmund Archer, Waiting for the Departure, 1932, oil on canvas, 33 x 38 inches

On his return from Europe in December 1926, Archer rented a Richmond studio that had once belonged to the sculptor, Edward Virginius Valentine. There, he continued making portraits and figure studies and began to use African Americans as models.

Over three years, between 1927 and 1929, Archer's paintings were included in exhibitions held by the Whitney Studio Club in New York. The first year, he showed a painting he had made while living in New York called "Bathers, East River", the second, he showed a painting he had made in his Paris studio, "Man from Bordeaux", and the third, he showed a charcoal drawing called "Cornfield Negroes". For a few years, beginning in 1928, he exhibited regularly in local shows at the Richmond Woman's Club.

In 1930, a painting of Archer's called "Show Girl" won third prize in a competition held at the Corcoran Gallery of Art in Washington, D.C. Of it, a critic for the New York Times wrote, "'Show Girl', by Edmund Archer, is so powerful a painting, so brilliant in its contrasts of color, so sound in its drawing, that it strikes a distinct note in modern art. For a painting to recall Ingres and Van Gogh at once, is for it to have accomplished a tour de force in art. This, the painting of Edmund Archer's has done. Writing in The American Magazine of Art, another critic said the painting "holds no illusion... The canvas is hard in outline and blatant in its color range". A year later, the Richmond League of Fine Arts bought the painting and when the League merged into the new Richmond Academy of Arts, it was put on display in its permanent collection.

In 1930, Archer was named an assistant director of the new Whitney Museum of American Art and a year later he contributed paintings to the museum's opening exhibition. Between 1932 and 1938, the museum held a series of biennial exhibitions that were modeled on the Corcoran Biennials but on a smaller scale. Paintings of Archer's were included in these exhibitions and in the series of annuals that succeeded them. On three occasions, the museum used its purchase fund to buy Archer's paintings. Archer's 1930 oil, "Buying Flowers", shown above (1), was one of the first of these acquisitions. It shows the flat style for which he was known early in his career. Another of the museum's purchases was a portrait called "Organdy Collar", acquired in 1938. Shown above (2), it is in the modeled style of most of his later work.

During the early 1930s, Archer showed frequently in commercial galleries: in Boston at the Pancoast Gallery in 1929 and in New York at the Macbeth Gallery in 1933, the Seligmann Galleries in 1934, the Rehn and Ferargil Galleries in 1935 A critic called attention to his painting, "Brick Carrier", in the Seligmann show, calling it "remarkable depiction of a sturdy Negro's back and arms as his figure proceeded up a ladder bearing the burden of building material upon his head, and for the brilliant coloring employed". A commissioned painting of two children also drew attention in this show. Painted in a flat style with brilliant coloring, it was dubbed a "portrait mural". In covering the show, the New York Times included a photograph of this work, labeling it "The most beautiful creation seen last week".

During the 1934 World's Fair held in Chicago, a painting of Archer's called "Waiting for the Departure" was included in a comprehensive exhibition of paintings from American collections held at the Art Institute. This work is shown above (3). Other names given the painting were ""At the Window" and "Waiting for the Procession". When Life magazine reproduced the painting in its issue for May 26, 1941, the image caption referred to Archer as "Virginia's most important contemporary artist". It received first prize and was voted most popular painting at the Norfolk Museum of Fine Arts and Painting exhibition of 1950. Between 1936 and 1940, Archer showed periodically in exhibitions at the Art Students' League.

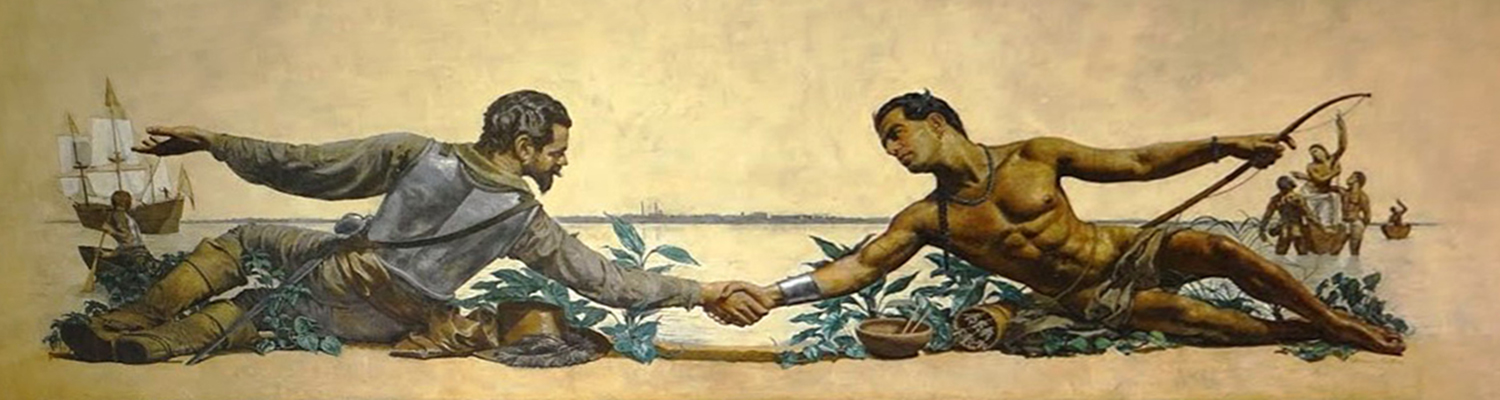
Edmund Archer, Capt. Francis Eppes Making Friends with the Appomattox Indians, mural, 1939, oil on canvas

In 1938, the Virginia Museum of Fine Arts gave him a solo exhibition that included a mural, "Captain Francis Eppes Making Friends with the Appomattox Indians", which he had made for a post office in Hopewell, Virginia, as part of the Depression-era United States post office murals project. Meant to inspire confidence at a time when many Americans felt despair, the mural, shown above, depicts an English adventurer, Francis Wayles Eppes VI, clasping the hand of the chief of the Appomattox Indians. A contemporary describes the painting's uplifting and romantic subject: "The Englishman and the Indian, half-reclining, face each other on a vast stretch of beach and clasp hands in a gesture of great strength and grace. Eppes gestures with his right hand at his ship on the water, its sails white against a light-bathed sky. The Indian is a beautiful fellow, and just behind him are smaller, symbolic figures of other Indians on the water. It is a wonderfully lively, noble and happy picture, from the bright virgin look of the fresh beach to the thin, symbolic line of the city of the future on the horizon". Other critics viewed Archer's heroic treatment of his subject as absurd and one of them noted that the friendly greeting that he showed between Eppes and the chief was a myth. The Appomattox did not welcome the English settlers. At the time Eppes first arrived from England, they had been defending themselves against incursions by the colonists in a series of conflicts known as the Anglo-Powhatan Wars. Far from treating them as brothers, Eppes led an attack on the tribe in 1627, only a few years after his arrival. The 1938 solo exhibition also contained fifteen paintings having African-American subjects. At the time, Archer told an interviewer that he preferred African-American models because he found in them a vitality he could not find in other figural subjects adding that he hoped American artists would take advantage of the "vitality, exuberance and color" of African-American culture to help make "great art" that would rival the art of European painters. During this exhibition, a reporter said Archer was "considered Virginia's greatest contemporary painter, and one of the best of the young artists in the United States". In 1939, a solo exhibition at the Gertrude Herbert Institute of Art, Augusta, Georgia, also featured paintings of African-Americans

Archer left his position at the Whitney Museum in 1940 and moved to Washington, D.C., where he lived during World War II. In 1944 he remained in the city, taking a position as an art instructor at the Corcoran School of Art and occasionally also teaching at nearby George Washington University. In 1957, a critic referred to him as the Corcoran faculty's most conservative painter.

During the late 1940s, 1950s, and 1960s, he continued painting portraits. During these years he exhibited freely in group shows at the Corcoran. He was given a solo exhibition of portraits at Richmond's Valentine Museum in 1957 and six years later he helped to found a gallery called the Hand Workshop Art Center, in that city.

He retired from teaching in 1968 and returned to live in Richmond.

=== Artistic style ===
Edmund Archer one of the younger artists who has only recently been included in the shows held at the Rehn Galleries, contributes one of the exhibition's outstanding canvasses—a portrait study of a Negro Wrestler. Mr. Archer is a Southerner and although he frequently paints Negro subjects, he does not emphasize the exotic or decorative qualities of his subject, as is too frequently case with the Northern cult of the Negro in art. His pictures carry with them the conviction of real experience, he knows his subject and the Negroes whom he paints are people and personalities. Added to this is his vigorous, almost sculptural, treatment of form.

— Helen Appleton Read in the Brooklyn Daily Eagle, 5 May 1935

Archer's preference for figure studies and portraits was formed at an early age. Writing in 1934, a critic referred to his work as realistic and free of abstraction but, all the same, "far from being what is generally termed academic". In the mid-1930s, he began using a flat technique with bright colors that one critic called "mural style" and another described as having "flat planes and overlapping patterns". Nonetheless, most of his portraits and figure studies convey an illusion of three-dimensionality. One critic said some of these paintings showed "vigorous, almost sculptural, treatment of form". Another wrote: "His sitters seem to move in the picture space and almost come forward into the room, and their strongly modeled forms demand lots of room".

In 1941, Archer was photographed using an unusual technique in which he placed his easel next to his model and painted using a brush attached to a long pole.

Throughout his career, there was considerable discussion of his paintings of African Americans. In praising these works, one critic said, "His pictures carry with them the conviction of real experience, he knows his subject and the Negroes whom he paints are people and personalities". Another said, "Mr. Archer paints with a superb pleasure in the shape, the strength, the flesh color of these People. They are solid, harmonious and powerful masses of strong, rich humanity, and each body stands out from the canvas with actuality that is amazing".

Some of his late portraits were unusually large while still displaying the sculptural style for which he had become known. A critic said these works were, "approximately life-size, with convincing individuality in the former and sound knowledge of anatomy in his figure paintings".

== Personal life and family ==
Archer was born in Richmond on 28 September 1904. His father was William Wharton Archer (1854–1928). He had been editor of two newspapers, the Richmond Standard (published between 1878 and 1882) and the Richmond State (also known as The State and published between 1876 and 1897) and was later associated with the Life Insurance Company of Virginia. His mother was Rosalie Harrison Pleasants Archer (1864–1945). For many years she was head of an amateur theater company that her first-born son, Adair, had founded in 1917. Her obituary also noted that she was "active in interracial work", having served on a Richmond committee on interracial relations and a council devoted to the prevention of lynching. Archer had two brothers, Adair Pleasants Archer (1894–1918), the founder of Richmond's first amateur theater company who and died of Spanish flu in an Illinois Army base, and William Wharton Archer, Jr. (1902–2000), an engineer. He was known to family and friends as "Ned".

In the early 1920s, Archer performed in plays staged by the amateur company presided over by his mother and throughout his life, reporters noted his social promenence in Richmond and New York. During World War II, Archer served in the 603rd Engineering Battalion, a unit of the U.S. Army responsible for camouflage and other visual deception that was made up largely of artists, illustrators, and designers. (Note: Other members of the 603rd Engineer Camouflage Battalion included hard-edge artist, Ellsworth Kelly; neo-expressionist painter, Edward Boccia; bird illustrator, Arthur B. Singer; illustrator and cartoonist, George Diestel; portrait photographer, Art Kane; illustrator, Arthur Shilstone; fashion designer Bill Blass, and The Munsters writer, Ed Haas.) Late in the war, he joined the U.S. Coast and Geodetic Survey in Washington, D.C., as a mapmaker.

Archer died in Richmond on 13 July 1986.
