= Willoughby Ions =

American dramatist

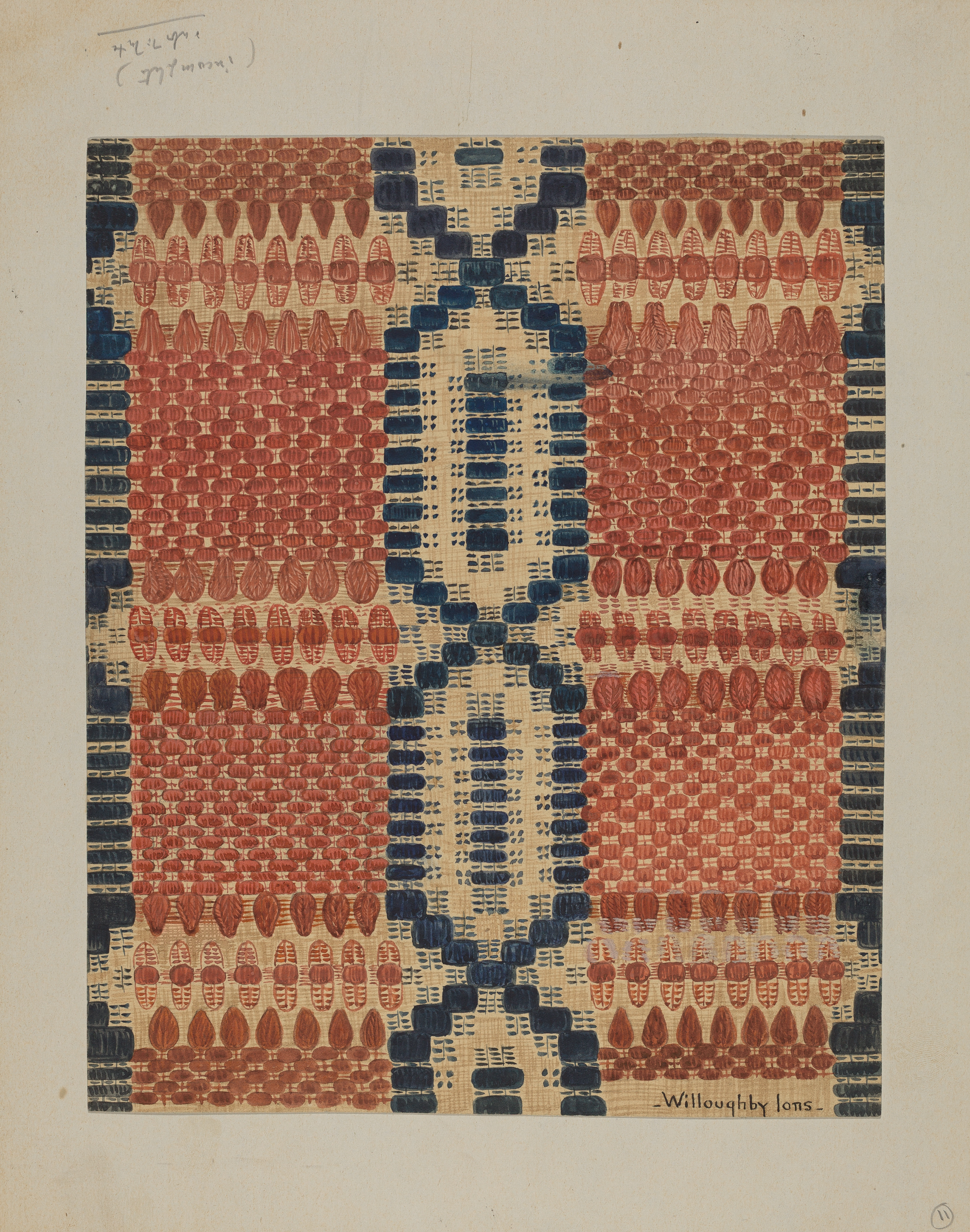
Coverlet, watercolor and graphite drawing by Willoughby Ions for the Index of American Design, now held by the National Gallery of Art

Willoughby Ions (1881–1977) was an American composer, artist, poet, dramatist, designer, and suffragist.

== Early life ==
Estelle deWilloughby Ions was born in 1881 in New Orleans to Cecile (nee Goodman) (1840-1930) and Robert Nevins Ions (1855 - 1949). At the age of 4, her family settled in Fairfax, Virginia, on family land called Innisfail Farm. Her grandmother was a student of Turner, and gave Ions her first training in art. She never attended any formal schooling. She was briefly married twice as a young woman, but retained the use of her own surname both times.

== Career ==
In the 1910s she was living in Washington DC, composing and performing on the piano, and being active in suffragist circles. She joined the Equal Suffrage League of Virginia and the Anthony League of Washington, DC.

In 1916 she moved to Greenwich Village in New York City and started a career as a costume and textile designer. She designed for Bonwit Teller and achieved some success as the original designer of the hostess gown (including for nationwide productions of Lawrence Langner's Pie). During this period she was known to have socialized with Sokei-an.

After her cousin Adèle Clark's partner, artist Nora Houston died, Ions left New York and was Clark's partner. In the 1930s she moved to Fairfax, Virginia and ran the Fairfax Gallery, which taught art classes to local children, and held exhibitions of their work. This led to her associations with the Federal Art Project in Virginia, and contributions to the Index of American Design.

Besides composition and textile/costume design, Ions worked in a wide variety of other styles and media. Ions and Adèle Clark helped prepare the transcriptions of Ora Canter's contributions to folklorist Richard Chase's 1956 book American Folk Tales and Songs. In 1941 she produced a series of hand-painted plates honoring Stephen Foster. She created batik gowns, stained glass art, murals, painted tapestries, and children's toys.

== Legacy ==
Some of her artworks are held at the National Gallery of Art. Her papers are held at the Virginia Historical Society. In 1964, she was interviewed as part of an oral history project by the Archives of American Art.

== Selected works ==
- The Age of Innocents (musical satire)
- All in a Golden Springtime (Victorian satirical opera in 3 acts, 1934)
- A Frawg Went Courtin' (play in 2 acts)
- To The Victors (poem)
- Sweet is Tipperary in the Spring (song, words by Dennis A. McCarthy)
- The Tide Rises, The Tide Falls, (song, setting of Longfellow's poem, 1913)
