= Elizabeth Langhorne Lewis =

American suffragist

- Born: December 9, 1851; Botetourt County, Virginia, US
- Died: January 30, 1946 (aged 94); Lynchburg, Virginia, US
- Known for: Women's Suffrage Campaigner

Elizabeth Dabney Langhorne Lewis (9 December 1851 – 30 January 1946) was the founder of the Lynchburg Equal Suffrage League and vice-president of the Equal Suffrage League of Virginia. She was also one of the founders of the Virginia League of Women Voters.

== Early life ==
Elizabeth Dabney Langhorne was born in 1851 in Botetourt County, Virginia. As a child, she lived in Lynchburg, Virginia, and attended private schools in Lynchburg and Charlottesville. As a young woman, Langhorne taught in a number of schools in the Lynchburg area. She was also an accomplished pianist and an active member in the Lynchburg artistic community. In August 1873, Langhorne married John Henry Lewis, a civil war veteran and attorney. Later in life, Elizabeth Langhorne Lewis was elected president of the Lynchburg Women's Club twice.

== Suffrage activity ==
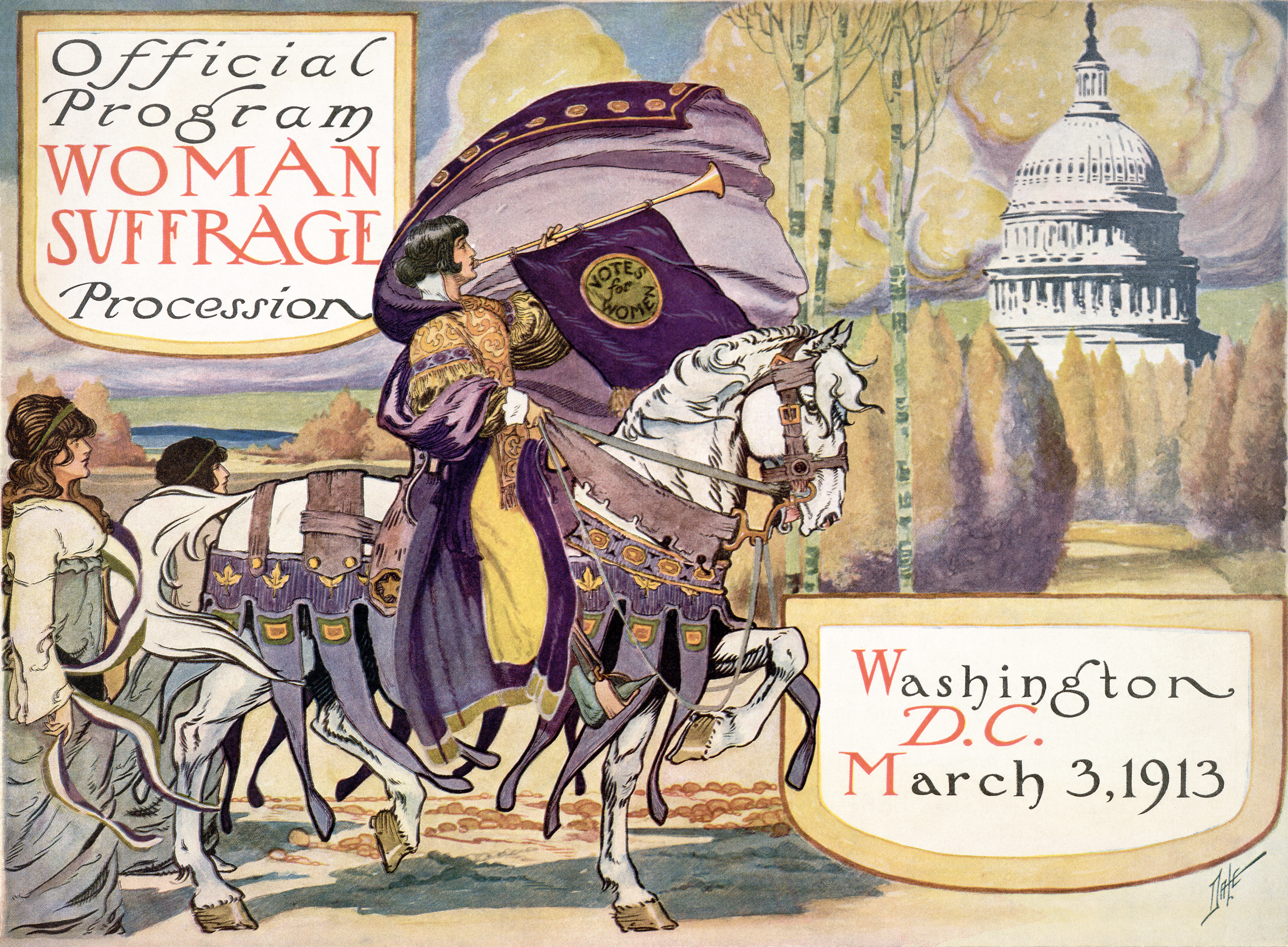
Elizabeth Langhorne Lewis helped to carry the Virginia banner in the Woman Suffrage Procession on the eve of Woodrow Wilson's inauguration

Lewis was the founder and president of the Lynchburg Equal Suffrage League. The group, founded in October 1910, created petitions in support of women’s suffrage addressed to the Virginia General Assembly and gave presentations to local organizations. The group also published the Lynchburg Woman's Suffrage News, which debuted in April 1917 and printed 5,000 copies.

In December 1911, Lewis was elected vice-president of the Lynchburg Equal Suffrage League and served in that role until the League dissolved after the passage of the 19th amendment.

In March 1913, Lewis helped to carry Virginia's banner in the Woman Suffrage Procession in Washington, DC, the first large organized march on Washington for political purposes. In October 1913, the annual meeting of the Equal Suffrage League of Virginia was organized by the Lynchburg Equal Suffrage League.

Lewis wrote an article for Virginia Suffrage News, published in November 1914. In it, she wrote "that the woman's qualification for citizenship is as valid as the man's—that her identity of interest, her intelligence, her morality, her patriotism and her proven efficiency" entitled women to all the rights and responsibilities of citizenship for which "equal suffrage is an indispensable element."

Lewis presented numerous speeches about suffrage in Southern Virginia in 1915 and 1916, organizing a number of suffrage leagues in the cities where she spoke. In 1915, she even represented Lila Valentine at a national suffrage convention. During these years, the League underwent rapid growth. In 1914, the Equal Suffrage League of Virginia had only 45 local chapters; in 1916, it had grown to 115 chapters.

In 1916, Lewis and her daughter Elizabeth Otey helped to persuade the Virginia Republican Party state convention to endorse women's suffrage. On October 2, 1916, she debated Congressman Henry DeLaWarr Flood in Appomattox County. Flood was against extending the vote to women and was an influential voice within the Virginia Democratic Party. After Virginia declined to pass a state-level suffrage amendment in 1916, Lewis focused on lobbying Virginia's congressional delegation in support of a federal constitutional amendment, known as the Susan B. Anthony amendment. She picketed the White House in 1917, accompanied by her daughter Elizabeth Otey. The group's banner read "Kaiser Wilson, have you forgotten your sympathy with the poor Germans because they were not self-governed? 20,000,000 American women are not self-governed. Take the beam out of your own eye." It was snatched away as the march began.

In the spring of 1918, Lewis' cousin Lila Valentine, the president of the Equal Suffrage League of Virginia, had undergone a serious operation. Lewis took over the running of the League in Valentine's place.

== League of Women Voters ==
The Equal Suffrage League of Virginia disbanded on November 8, 1920, and the Virginia League of Women Voters was organized two days later at the state Capitol. Lewis was elected to the very first League of Women Voters board of directors. From 1926 to 1927, she ruled as president of the state League. Lewis was president of the Lynchburg chapter of the Women Voters League for more than a decade after it was formed in 1920.

== Death ==
Lewis died in Lynchburg on January 30, 1946. She was ninety-four years old. Her remains were buried next to those of her husband.
