= Timeline of women's suffrage in Virginia =

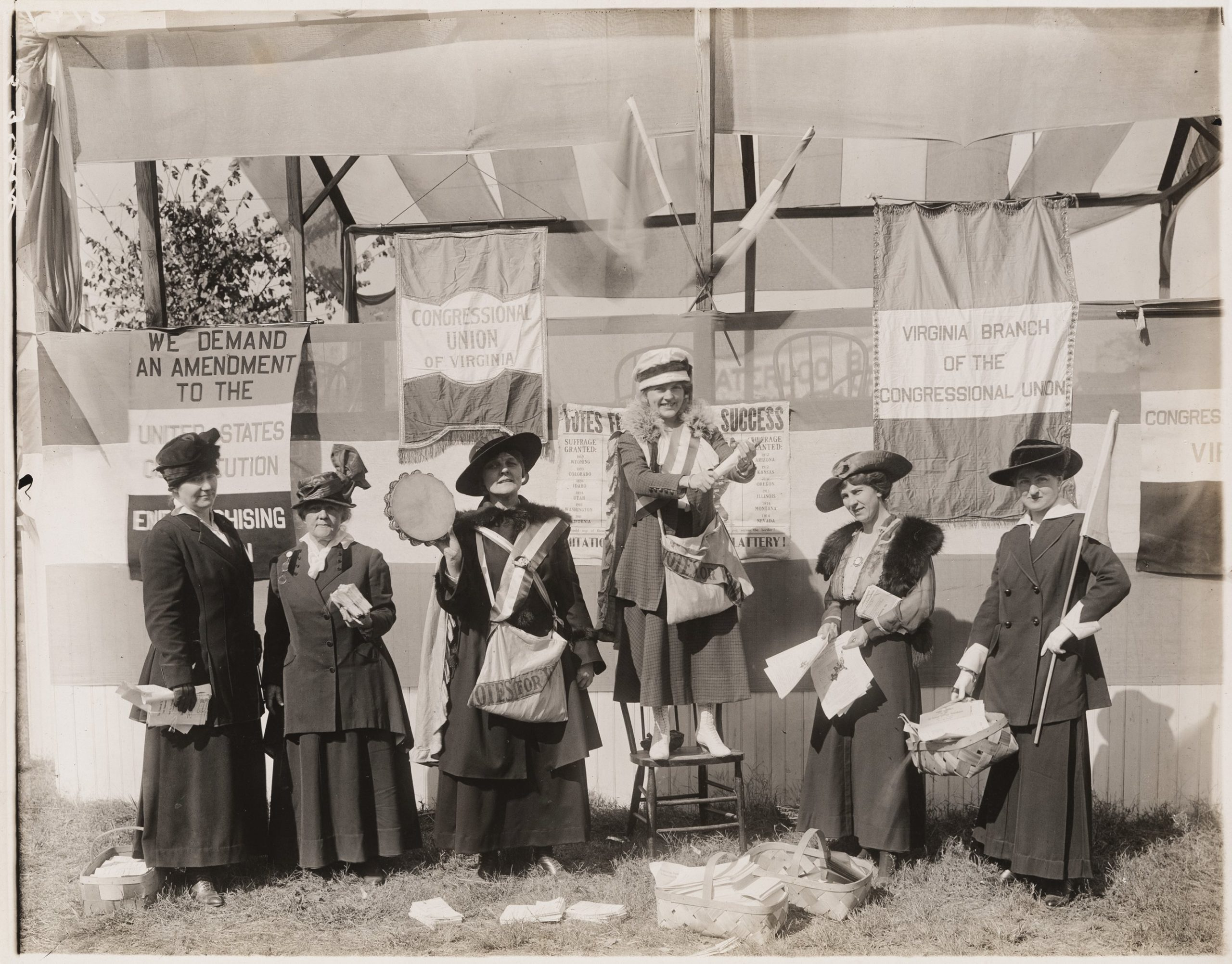
Virginia Congressional Union booth at the Virginia State Fair in 1916

This is a timeline of women's suffrage in Virginia. While there were some very early efforts to support women's suffrage in Virginia, most of the activism for the vote for women occurred early in the 20th century. The Equal Suffrage League of Virginia was formed in 1909 and the Virginia Branch of the Congressional Union for Woman Suffrage (later the National Woman's Party) was formed in 1915. Over the next years, women held rallies, conventions and many propositions for women's suffrage were introduced in the Virginia General Assembly. Virginia didn't ratify the Nineteenth Amendment until 1952. Native American women could not have a full vote until 1924 and African American women were effectively disenfranchised until the Voting Rights Act passed in 1965.

== 18th century ==
=== 1770s ===
1778

- Hannah Lee Corbin from Gloucester County protests women's taxation without representation.

== 19th century ==
=== 1870s ===
1870

- The Virginia State Woman Suffrage Association (VSWSA) is formed by Anna Whitehead Bodeker.

1871

- November: Bodeker attempts to vote in a municipal election in Virginia.

=== 1890s ===
1893

- The Virginia Suffrage Society is formed by Orra Gray Langhorne.

1895

- Susan B. Anthony gives a suffrage speech in Culpeper.

== 20th century ==
=== 1900s ===
1900

- Carrie Chapman Catt urges Virginia to adopt women's suffrage in the next constitutional convention.

1902

- Virginia disenfranchises many voters, including African Americans, poor whites and Republicans, during the state convention. A literacy test and poll tax is required for voters.

1909

- November 27: The Equal Suffrage League of Virginia is founded in the home of Anne Clay Crenshaw.

=== 1910s ===
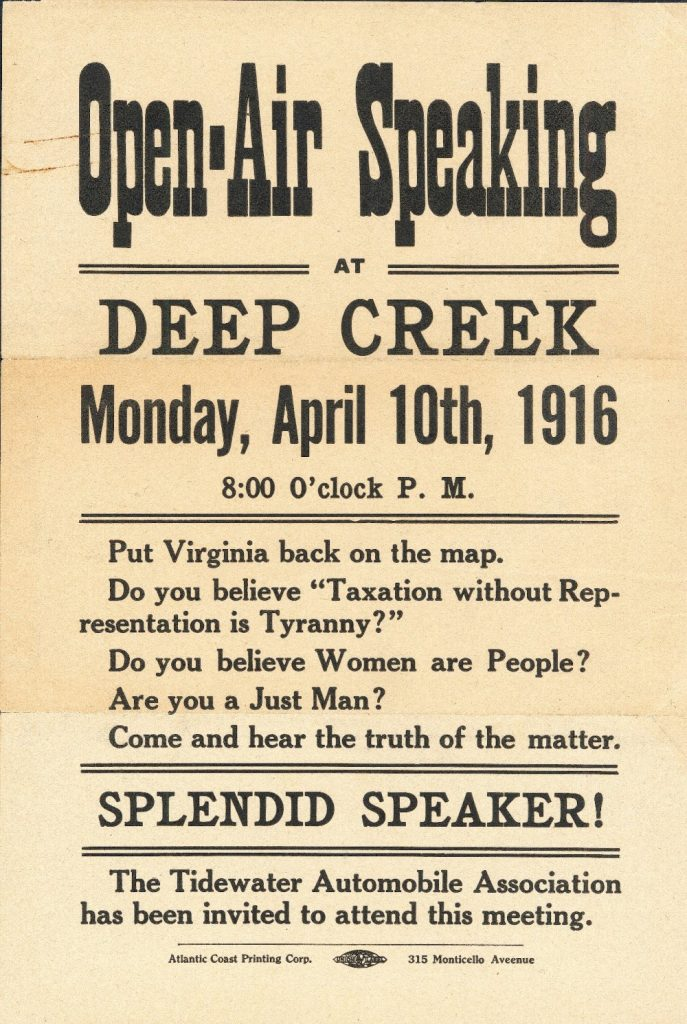
Suffrage speech April 10, 1916, near Norfolk, Virginia

1910

- February: The Equal Suffrage League of Virginia affiliates with the National American Woman Suffrage Association (NAWSA).

1911

- The first state suffrage convention was held in Richmond with delegates from Norfolk, Lynchburg, Williamsburg, and Highland Springs.

1912

- February: The House of Delegates rejects a resolution to amend the state constitution to allow woman suffrage.
- July: The National Association of Colored Women (NACW) holds their convention in Hampton where they have sessions on women's suffrage and the women's clubs of Hampton and Norfolk state a suffrage parade as part of the convention's activities.
- The Virginia Association Opposed to Woman Suffrage is formed.
- The Men's Equal Suffrage League of Virginia is formed.
- The second state suffrage convention is held in Norfolk.
- A resolution for women's suffrage is proposed in the House of the Virginia General Assembly by Hill Montague.

1913

- The third state suffrage convention is held in Lynchburg.

1914

- March: The House of Delegates rejects amending the state constitution to allow woman suffrage.
- May 2: Suffrage demonstration is held on the steps of the Virginia State Capitol.
- October: A monthly newspaper, the Virginia Suffrage News, is created.
- The fourth state suffrage convention is held in Roanoke.
- Another suffrage amendment is brought up in the House of the General Assembly.

1915

- From May till Thanksgiving, women held "street meetings" on women's suffrage in Lynchburg, Newport News, Norfolk, Portsmouth, Richmond, and Warrenton.
- May 1: A May Day celebration is held at the Capitol building, with suffragists hosting booths, selling buttons, flags and copies of the Woman's Journal.
- June 10: The Virginia Branch of the Congressional Union for Woman Suffrage is organized in Richmond with Sophie G. Meredith as chair.
- December: The fifth state suffrage convention is held in Richmond. Around 200 delegates marched to the governor's office.

1916

- February: The House of Delegates rejects amending the state constitution to allow woman suffrage.
- October: Aviator, Katharine Stinson, drops women's suffrage leaflets on behalf of the Virginia Congressional Union over the Virginia State Fair during the airshow.
- The sixth state suffrage convention was held in Norfolk.
- A third suffrage amendment is proposed in the House and the Senate of the General Assembly.

1917

- January 29 – February 2: Suffrage school is conducted in Richmond in concert with NAWSA.
- November: The seventh state convention on women's suffrage is held in Richmond.
- November 15: The Night of Terror takes place in the Occoquan Workhouse.
- December: Virginia sends the largest suffrage delegation to the National Suffrage convention in Washington, D.C.

1919

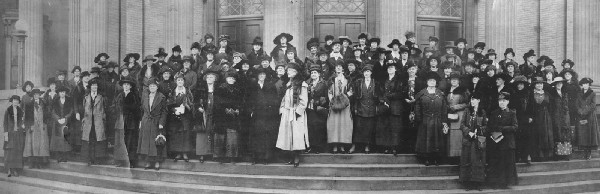
Virginia Equal Suffrage League convention photo from November 1919

- August 13: The General Assembly came together for a special session and suffragists used this time to learn politicians' positions on women's suffrage.
- November: State suffrage convention is held in Richmond.

=== 1920s ===
1920

- February 12: The Virginia General Assembly votes against ratifying the Nineteenth Amendment.
- August 26: The Nineteenth Amendment is declared ratified.
- September: The Equal Suffrage League of Virginia dissolves and becomes the League of Women Voters (LWV) of Virginia.
- September 2 – October 2: between 75,000 and 100,000 white and African American women register to vote in Virginia
- November 10: LWV of Virginia holds their first meeting.

1924

- Native American women are given the rights to vote.

=== 1950s ===
1952

- February 21: Virginia ratifies the Nineteenth Amendment.

=== 1960s ===
1965

- The Passage of the Voting Rights Act ends voter suppression against African American women.

== See also ==
- List of Virginia suffragists
- Women's suffrage in Virginia
- Women's suffrage in the United States
