= Lillie Logan =

American painter (1843–1923)

Josephine Maria Logan, known as Lillie (sometimes Lily) (October 2, 1843 — 1923) was an American painter and instructor, active for many years in Richmond, Virginia. She has been described as "probably Richmond's most esteemed teacher of art" in the late nineteenth century.

== Life ==
Logan was born at Melbrook plantation in Charleston, South Carolina. One of fifteen children born to George William Logan and Anna D'Oyley Glover Logan, she was the niece of physician Thomas Muldrup Logan and a sister of the Confederate General of the same name. At the outbreak of the American Civil War her family moved from Charleston to Columbia in an attempt to preserve their property from destruction; however, when William Tecumseh Sherman burned the town, their house was one of those destroyed during the raid. Logan went on to study art, traveling to Rome in 1882 and remaining until 1888; her instructor there was Giuseppe Ferrari. Upon moving to Richmond, Logan began teaching her classes in the Allan House, Moldavia, which had been the boyhood home of Edgar Allan Poe. In 1894 she opened a new studio at 410 West Franklin Street. In 1904 she went to North Carolina, where she lived for a time before returning to Richmond, where she died. Logan's pupils included Edyth Carter Beveridge, Adele Goodman Clark, and Nora Houston. Some of her work may be found in the collection of The Valentine.
