= Edith Clark Cowles =

American suffragist

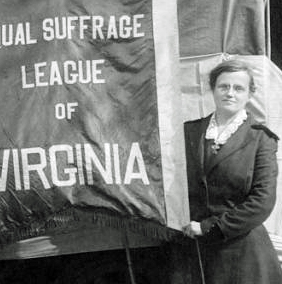
- Born: August 27, 1874; New Orleans, Louisiana
- Died: December 8, 1954 (aged 80); Richmond, Virginia
- Occupations: Suffragist, author

Edith Clark Cowles (1874 – 1954) was an American suffragist. She was one of the founders of the Equal Suffrage League of Virginia.

== Biography ==
Cowles was born on August 27, 1874, in New Orleans, Louisiana. She was the sister of Adele Goodman Clark. In 1903 she married Julius Deming Cowles with whom she had one child. They lived in Brooklyn where she taught kindergarten, having previously completed a training course in Richmond, Virginia. The couple eventually separated and perhaps divorced.

Cowles had family in Richmond and was probably involved with the formation of the Equal Suffrage League of Virginia in 1909 under the auspices of the National American Woman Suffrage Association. In 1914 Cowles permanently settled in Richmond. She served as executive secretary and press secretary for the Equal Suffrage League of Virginia from 1916 through 1920. She was especially active, along with Ida Mae Thompson in the running of the Richmond office when the president, Lila Meade Valentine, was ill.

After the passage of the Nineteenth Amendment in 1920 Cowles became active in the Equal Suffrage League of Virginia's successor organization, the Virginia League of Women Voters. She was on the board of directors and also the executive secretary and publicity director. Cowles contributed large portions of the chapter on Virginia to History of Woman Suffrage, published in 1922.

In 1923 Cowles helped found the Lewis Ginter Library at the Ginter Park Community House. She was the executive secretary of the Community House for over 20 years, also serving as librarian.

Cowles died on December 8, 1954, in Richmond.
