= Mary Lockwood =

Mary Lockwood may refer to:

- Mary Anne Lockwood (b. 1858), Australian temperance worker and suffragist
- Mary Morris Hall Lockwood (1871–1936), American suffragist
- Mary Smith Lockwood (1831–1922), one of the founders of the Daughters of the American Revolution
