= Janet Stuart Oldershaw Durham =

American suffragist

- Born: Janet Stuart Oldershaw; May 14, 1879; Chicago, Illinois, U.S.
- Died: March 13, 1969 (aged 89); Richmond, Virginia, U.S.
- Education: University of Chicago; Columbia University; University of Richmond
- Occupation(s): Suffragist, lawyer, clubwoman
- Spouse: James Ware Durham

Janet Stuart Oldershaw Durham (1879 – 1969) was an American suffragist, clubwoman, lawyer, and politician. She twice ran as a Democrat for the Virginia House of Delegates, in 1921 and 1923, but was not elected. She passed the bar exam in Virginia in 1925 and went on to practice law. Durham was active in the women's suffrage movement as a member of the Equal Suffrage League of Virginia and the League of Women Voters.

== Biography ==
Durham née Oldershaw was born on May 14, 1879, in Chicago, Illinois to Percival Piggatt Oldershaw, a Union Army veteran and commission merchant, and Florence Stuart Gould Oldershaw. In 1904 she graduated from University of Chicago. The same year she married the Baptist minister James Ware Durham.

In the early 1910s Durham joined the Equal Suffrage League of Virginia. After the passage of the Nineteenth Amendment in 1920 Durham was a charter member of the Virginia League of Women Voters, the successor organization of the Equal Suffrage League. In 1921 Durham was one of two women who ran in the Democratic primary for a Richmond seat in the Virginia House of Delegates. The other female candidate was Mary Bell Perkins. Neither women won their primaries. In 1923 Durham ran again for the House of Delegates, again losing in the Democratic primary election.

Durham then focused her attention on her education; earning a master's degree from Columbia University in 1925, and then earning a B.L. at the T. C. Williams School of Law in 1926. She had already passed the Virginia bar exam in 1925. She went on to practice law.

Durham served a six-year term on the board of the Virginia Home and Industrial School for Girls at Bon Air, a state juvenile correctional center. She was a member of the Virginia chapter of the General Federation of Women's Clubs and the Virginia Federation of Garden Clubs.

Durham died on March 13, 1969, in Richmond.
