= Elizabeth Lewis Otey =

American economist and suffragist

- Born: Elizabeth Dabney Langhorne Lewis; October 4, 1880; Lynchburg, Virginia
- Died: February 28, 1974 (aged 93); Lynchburg, Virginia
- Education: Bryn Mawr College, University of Berlin
- Spouse: Dexter Otey (m. 1910; died in 1933)

Elizabeth Lewis Otey (1880–1974) was an American economist and suffragist.

== Biography ==
Otey née Lewis was born on October 4, 1880, in Lynchburg, Virginia. She was the daughter of the suffragist Elizabeth Langhorne Lewis and John Henry Lewis. She attended preparatory school at Randolph-Macon Woman's College, where she later returned for her higher education, in addition to Bryn Mawr College. She earned a doctorate in economics from the University of Berlin. She went on to author reports on labor and employment for the Bureau of Labor Statistics and the United States Department of Commerce and Labor.

In 1910 Otey became a member of the Lynchburg Equal Suffrage League, which was founded by her mother Elizabeth Langhorne Lewis. The same year she married Dexter Otey on June 4, 1910, with whom she had one child named Elizabeth Lewis Otey Watson, born in 1911.

Otey was a member of the Equal Suffrage League of Virginia as well as serving in the Congressional Union for Women Suffrage and the Virginia National Woman's Party. She marched in the 1913 Woman Suffrage Procession and in 1916 attended the Republican State Convention to advocate for the party's endorsement of woman suffrage.

After the ratification of the Nineteenth amendment in 1920 Otey ran for the statewide office of superintendent of public instruction. She won the Republican party's nomination, but lost the election. In 1931 Otey ran for the Virginia House of Delegates as a Socialist. In 1933 she ran for United States Senate, again as a Socialist against the incumbent Harry F. Byrd and lost.

In 1933, Otey went on to work for the Social Security Administration and the Foreign Economic Administration. She published a study in 1940 called “ An Outline for Foreign Social insurance and Assistance laws.” She retired in 1948.

Otey died on February 28, 1974, in Lynchburg.

In 2018 the Virginia Capitol Foundation announced that Otey's name would be on the Virginia Women's Monument's glass Wall of Honor.
