= Maud Jamison =

American suffragette

Maud Powell Jamison (14 January 1890 – 18 June 1974) was an American suffragist. She joined the National Women's Party in 1916, and organized in support of women's suffrage, which led to multiple arrests and four prison sentences. Along with Alice Paul, the chair of the National Women's Party, Jamison and others picketed in front of the White House to pressure President Woodrow Wilson to support women's suffrage from 1917 to 1919.

== Life ==
She grew up in Norfolk, Virginia. Starting in 1909, she taught in Norfolk public schools. She joined the Equal Suffrage League of Virginia. In 1915, she also joined the Congressional Union for Woman Suffrage.

In 1916, she moved to Washington, D.C., to volunteer for the National Women's Party. On June 25, 1917, she was arrested picketing the White House. On August 28, she was arrested, and sentenced to 30 days in the Occoquan Workhouse. On October 6, and October 8, 1917, she was arrested again. In October 1918, she picketed the United States Capitol.

She moved to Topeka, Kansas, where she married John Earl Thomas, on 16 July 1921. In the 1930s, she moved to San Gabriel, California. She died on 18 June 1974, in Los Angeles
