= Mary Ellen Pollard Clarke =

American suffragist

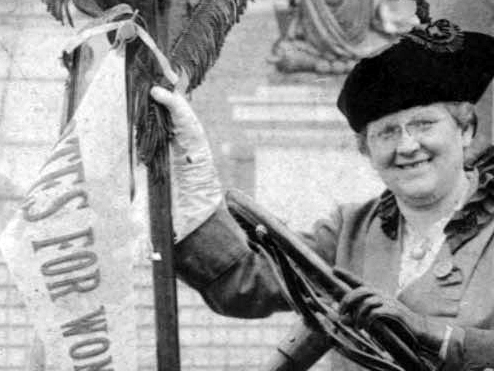
- Born: Mary Ellen Pollard; August 22, 1862; King and Queen County, Virginia
- Died: July 30, 1939 (aged 76); Henrico County, Virginia
- Other names: Mrs. G. Harvey Clarke
- Occupations: Suffragist, author

Mary Ellen Pollard Clarke (1862–1939) was an American suffragist. She was the editor-in-chief of the short-lived Virginia Suffrage News and the author of essays on public policy, literature, and suffrage.

== Biography ==
Clarke née Pollard was born on August 22, 1862, in King and Queen County, Virginia, one of nine siblings. On 15 November 1882 she married George Harvey Clarke with whom she had five children. The couple settled in Richmond, Virginia.

Clarke was an active clubwoman. In 1889 she help found the Every Tuesday Club literary society. She was a member of the Woman's Club of Richmond as well as the Virginia Federation of Women's Clubs. She was particularly interested in improving education and reducing illiteracy. As a member of the Richmond Education Association she advocated for a free public library. She subsequently was appointed to the State Library Board of Virginia, serving two five-year terms from 1922 through 1932. She was the first female member of the board. Clarke was also volunteered with Co-Operative Education Association of Virginia.

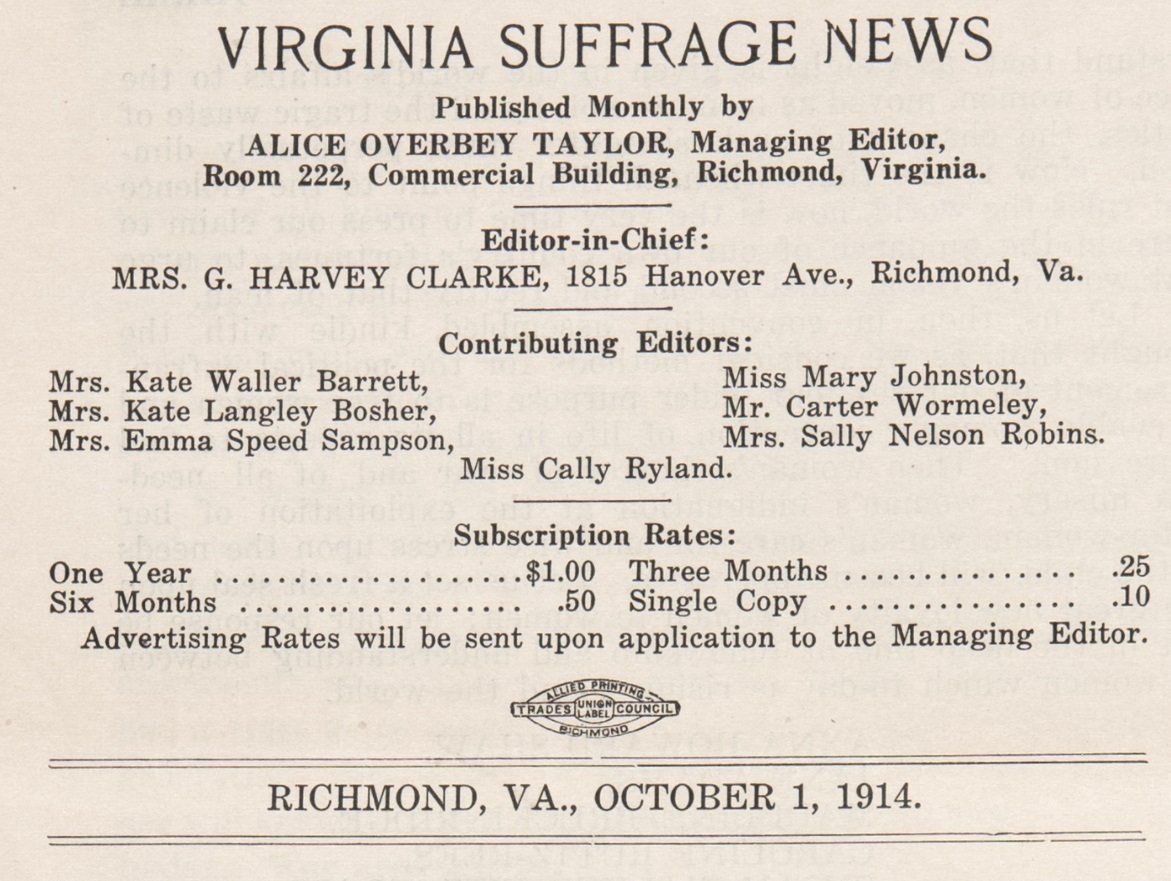
Virginia Suffrage News, first edition, October 1, 1914

Clarke was a suffragist. She joined the Equal Suffrage League of Virginia in 1911. She served as the editor-in-chief of the Virginia Suffrage News which was founded by Alice Overbey Taylor, producing three issues in 1914. Clarke went on to chair the Equal Suffrage League of Virginia's Committee on Political Study and Research. In that position she wrote essays advocating the value of women's voices in politics to bring about improvements in public welfare, including ending child labor and bringing education to children.

In 1916, in an effort to persuade white men to enfranchise women, Clarke wrote an essay Equal Suffrage and the Negro Vote arguing that suffrage for women would increase the state's white vote and ensure the state's white leadership would remain.

After the passage of the Nineteenth Amendment in 1920 Clarke wrote Studies in Citizenship for the Virginia Woman and Facts of Government Every Virginia Woman Should Know. The Equal Suffrage League of Virginia became the Virginia League of Women Voters. Clarke was a member and represented Virginia at the Regional Conference of the National League of Women Voters in 1921.

Clarke died on July 30, 1939, in Henrico County outside Richmond.
