= Crenshaw House (Richmond, Virginia) =

Historic house in Virginia, United States

- U.S. National Register of Historic Places
- U.S. Historic district – Contributing property
- Virginia Landmarks Register
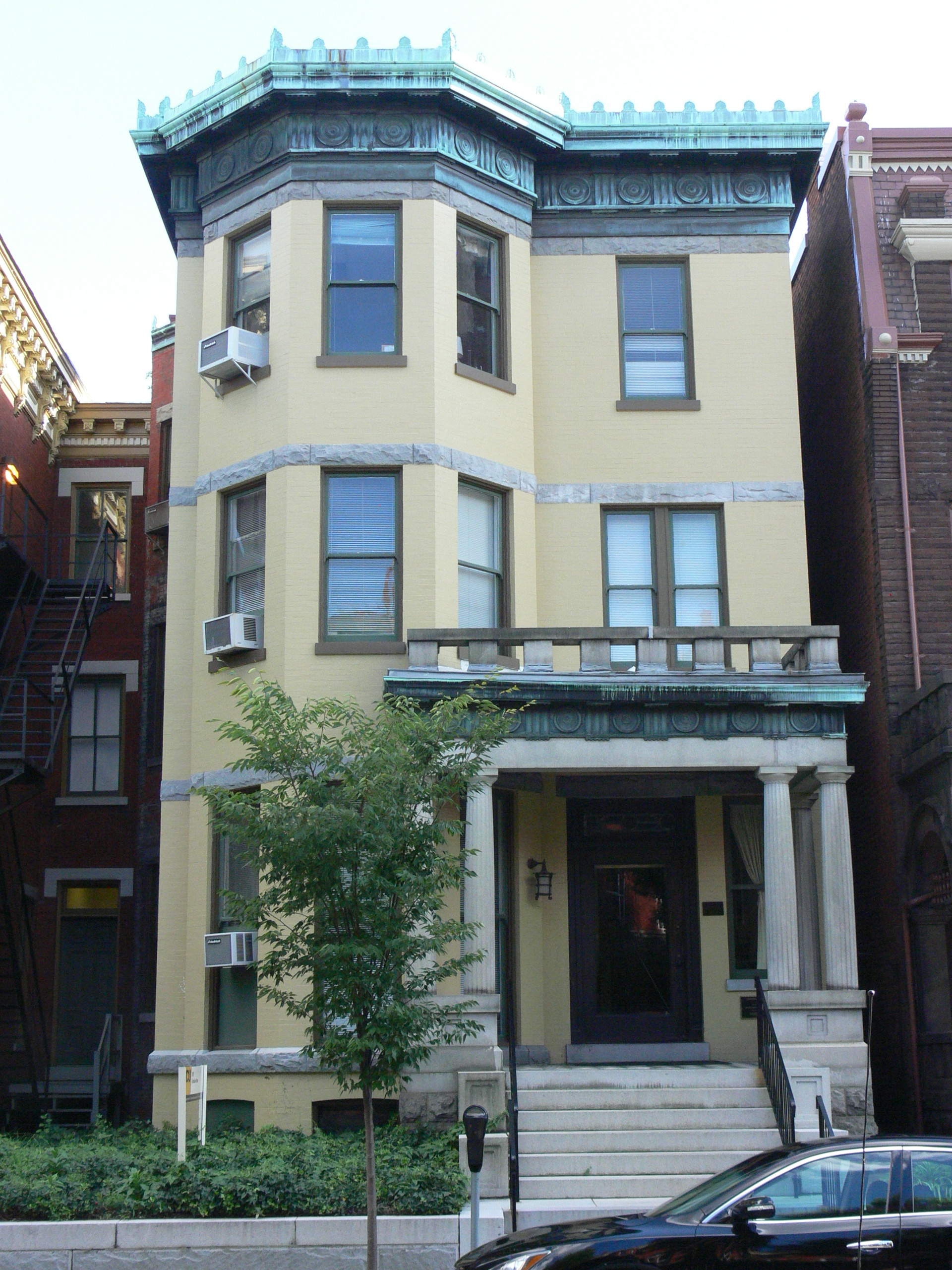
- Crenshaw House, July 2011

- Location within Virginia Location within the United States
- Location: 919 W Franklin St, Richmond, Virginia
- Coordinates: 37°32′59″N 77°25′54″W
- Area: Less than one acre
- Built: 1891, 1904
- Architect: Noland & Baskervill
- Architectural style: Victorian Italianate
- Part of: West Franklin Street Historic District (ID72001528)
- NRHP reference No.: 10000585
- VLR No.: 127-0228-0029

Significant dates
- Added to NRHP: August 30, 2010
- Designated CP: September 14, 1972
- Designated VLR: June 17, 2010

Crenshaw House, also known as Younger House and Clay House, is a historic home located in Richmond, Virginia. It was built in 1891, and is a three-story, Victorian Italianate style brick townhouse. The house was altered by the architectural firm of Noland and Baskervill in 1904. It features a flat roof decorated with a Doric entablature and copper cresting, a full height three-sided bay window, and an entry porch supported by paired Doric order columns. At two meetings in November 1909, a group of women met at the home to form what would become the Equal Suffrage League of Virginia (ESL).

It was listed on the National Register of Historic Places in 2010. It is located in the West Franklin Street Historic District.
