= Thomas M. Logan =

American soldier (1840–1914)

Thomas Muldrup Logan
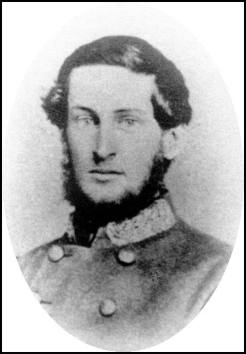
- Born: November 3, 1840; Charleston, South Carolina
- Died: August 11, 1914 (aged 73); New York City, New York
- Burial place: Hollywood Cemetery located in Richmond, Virginia
- Military career
- Allegiance: United States of America; Confederate States of America
- Branch: (Confederate States of America) Confederate States Army
- Service years: 1861–65
- Rank: Brigadier General
- Conflicts: American Civil War

Thomas Muldrup Logan (November 3, 1840 – August 11, 1914) was an American soldier and businessman. He served as a Confederate general during the American Civil War, and afterward was greatly involved in railroad development in the Southern United States.

== Early life and career ==
Thomas M. Logan was born in 1840 in Charleston, South Carolina. Logan's family is of ancient Scottish descent. He was the son of George William Logan, a local judge, and Anna D'Oyley Glover; a sister was the painter Lillie Logan. His great-great grandfather was Christian Thomassen Muldrup, His Danish Majesty's Consul for Scotland and the North of England, born 1721 and married to Honoria Bray. Logan received his education at South Carolina College, located in Columbia. He graduated in 1860, standing first in his class.

== Civil War service ==
When the American Civil War began in 1861, Logan chose to follow his home state of South Carolina and the Confederate cause. He volunteered for the Washington Light Infantry, which participated in the Battle of Fort Sumter on April 12–13. Later that month he was appointed a second lieutenant in the Confederate Army, and in May he was promoted to first lieutenant and joined Wade Hampton's Legion. Logan was assigned to Company A of the unit, which had been formed in Charleston.

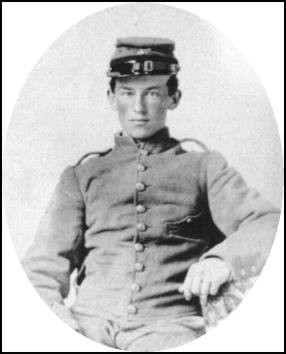
Early photograph of Logan

Following the Confederate victory at the First Battle of Bull Run in July, Logan was promoted to the rank of captain. He fought during the Seven Days Battles in the spring of 1862, and was wounded in a foot at the Battle of Gaines' Mill on June 27. Logan also fought during the Second Battle of Bull Run on August 28–30. He was cited for "great bravery" during the Battle of Antietam on September 17, and was promoted to major from that date. That December Logan was promoted to the rank of lieutenant colonel.

Logan served in Brig. Gen. Micah Jenkins brigade in 1863, taking part in the Suffolk Operations that spring. He then went with the rest of the First Corps units to the Western Theater. Logan participated in the Battle of Chickamauga and Knoxville Campaign that winter, missing the Battle of Chattanooga. On May 19, 1864, Logan was promoted to colonel.

Logan was wounded for the second time during the Battle of Riddells' Shop on June 13, 1864. He was appointed a temporary brigadier general on December 1, but it was not confirmed by the Confederate Congress, and reverted to a colonel. However, during that short time Logan was the youngest general officer in the Confederate Army. In early 1865 Logan served with Hampton during the Carolinas campaign, and was promoted to brigadier general on February 15. He served in Petersburg as well as fighting in the Battle of Bentonville from March 19–21. Logan surrendered along with the rest of Hampton's forces on April 9, and was paroled on May 1 from Greensboro, North Carolina.

== Postbellum career ==
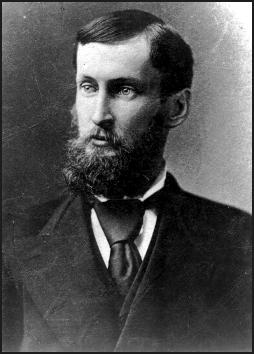
Logan after the Civil War

After the end of the war in 1865, Logan returned home to his civilian life. That May he borrowed $5 USD from a friend and married Kate Virginia Cox (1840–1915), the daughter of James H. Cox, a judge from Chesterfield County, Virginia. The couple would have nine children, but were survived by only a son and three daughters.

Logan began to study law and entered into the railroad industry. After the Civil War, he became president of the Port Walthall spur line of the Richmond and Petersburg Railroad. The spur was destroyed in the War and never restored. He was then the "principal organizer" of what would become the Southern Railway, and was often associated in businesses with American industrialist/philanthropist John D. Rockefeller. Entering politics as well, Logan was part of the Virginia Democratic Executive Committee in 1879 and the Virginia "Gold Democrat" party in 1896, serving both as their chairman.

Logan died in 1914 at his apartment in New York City, New York, due to a "complication of diseases." His body was buried in Hollywood Cemetery, located in Richmond, Virginia, following a funeral on August 12.

== See also ==
- List of American Civil War generals (Confederate)
- List of American Civil War generals (Union)
- Bibliography of the American Civil War
