= West Franklin Street Historic District =

Historic district in Virginia, United States

- U.S. National Register of Historic Places
- U.S. Historic district
- Virginia Landmarks Register
- Richmond City Historic District
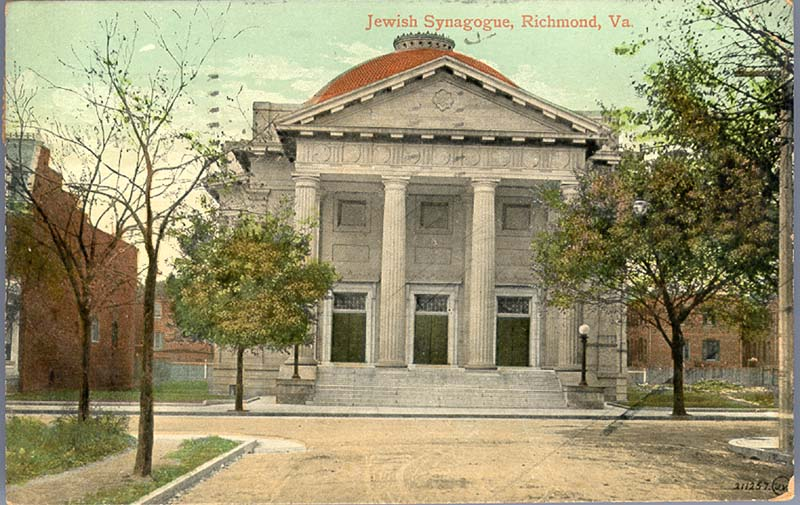
- Postcard of Temple Beth Ahaba, 1914

- Location within Virginia Location within the United States
- Location: W. Franklin St. between Laurel and Ryland Sts., 900 blk. West Grace St., 4000 blk. N. Harrison St., 300 blk. Shafer St., Richmond, Virginia
- Coordinates: 37°32′58″N 77°27′13″W
- Area: 11 acres (4.5 ha)
- Built: 1870-1920
- Architect: Allen & Ginter; Alderson Brownstone Co.
- Architectural style: Greek Revival, Romanesque, Georgian Revival, Queen Anne, Italianate
- NRHP reference No.: 72001528, 09000731 (Boundary Increase)
- VLR No.: 127-0228

Significant dates
- Added to NRHP: September 14, 1972, September 16, 2009 (Boundary Increase)
- Designated VLR: March 21, 1972, June 18, 2009

The West Franklin Street Historic District is a national historic district located at Richmond, Virginia. It is located along the northern boundary of the Fan district. The district encompasses 71 contributing buildings built between about 1870 and the 1920. It was originally developed as a primarily residential district with buildings in a variety of popular late-19th and early-20th century architectural styles including Greek Revival, Romanesque, Georgian Revival, Queen Anne, and Italianate. Many of the dwellings have been converted to commercial use. In addition, the district's private houses have been converted into multi-family housing and departmental offices for Virginia Commonwealth University. Notable buildings include Franklin Terrace, the Ritter-Hickock House, First Independent Church, Founder's Hall, the Raleigh Building, The Greyston Apartments, Gresham Court Apartments, and the Beth Ahabah Congregation Hall and Synagogue.

It was added to the National Register of Historic Places in 1972, with a boundary increase in 2009.

== See also ==
- Congregation Beth Ahabah
- Crenshaw House
- National Register of Historic Places listings in Richmond, Virginia
