= Ida Mae Thompson =

American suffragist

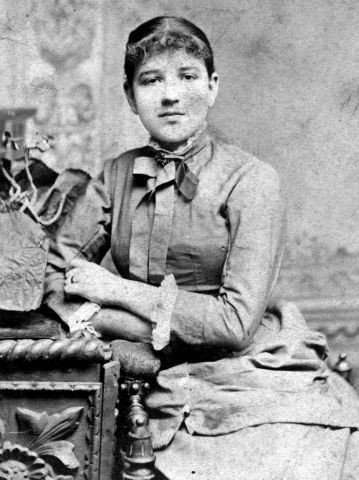
- by an unknown photographer
- Born: November 7, 1866; Drakes Branch, Virginia
- Died: July 24, 1947 (aged 72); Richmond, Virginia
- Occupations: Suffragist, archivist

Ida Mae Thompson (1866 – 1947) was an American suffragist. She was active in the Equal Suffrage League of Virginia and later worked for the Works Progress Administration's Historical Records to obtain and archive records from the suffrage movement in Virginia.

== Biography ==
Thompson was born on November 7, 1866, in Drakes Branch, Virginia. In 1886 the family moved to Richmond. Thompson supported herself as a typist and stenographer.

In 1913 Thompson began working at the Richmond headquarters of the Equal Suffrage League of Virginia. She served as headquarters secretary and took care of the day-to-day responsibilities of the office manager; ordering supplies, arranging rent payments, speaker schedules, event planning, and organization mailings. Thompson took on more planning duties, along with Edith Clark Cowles, in the running of the Richmond office when the president, Lila Meade Valentine, was ill.

After the passage of the Nineteenth Amendment in 1920 Thompson became active in the Equal Suffrage League of Virginia's successor organization, the Virginia League of Women Voters. She first served as executive secretary of the Richmond LWV and then executive secretary of the Virginia LWV. Thompson assisted Cowles with her contributions to the chapter on Virginia to History of Woman Suffrage, published in 1922.

In the 1930s, during the Great Depression Thompson continued working for the LWV, but took another job as a clerk for the U.S. Department of Labor National Re-Employment Service. In the mid-1930s Thompson added another job as a clerk and researcher for Works Progress Administration's Historical Records project to assemble historical documents pertaining to suffrage in Virginia. In 1936 Thompson contacted former members of the Equal Suffrage League of Virginia requesting any records, papers, stories and ephemera documenting the woman suffrage movement in Virginia. She had mixed results, with some members having disposed of their records and others being able to locate the historical items requested. Thompson herself had the records she kept from the Richmond headquarters, which she donated. The collected material became the Equal Suffrage League of Virginia Records housed at the Library of Virginia. The collection consists of 31 boxes of primary documents from the suffrage movement in Virginia on the local and state level including materials from the National American Woman Suffrage Association (NAWSA) and the LWV along with the Equal Suffrage League of Virginia.

In 1938 Thompson, who never married, moved into the Home for Needy Confederate Women (now the Stan and Dorothy Pauley Center on the grounds of the Virginia Museum of Fine Arts in Richmond). She died on July 24, 1947, in Richmond.
