= Janetta R. FitzHugh =

Janetta R. FitzHugh (April 16, 1866 – May 16, 1950) was a women's suffragette. She was born in Fredericksburg, Virginia, where she helped to found the Fredericksburg Civic Betterment Club in 1911 and was elected president. Her early work with the club focused on sanitation and public health. She was better known, however, for her work in the suffragette movement.

== Suffragette movement ==
By 1911, FitzHugh expanded her work into the suffragette movement. That year, she and her friend, the novelist and suffragist Mary Johnston, donated several books on hygiene and morality to the Equal Suffrage League of Virginia's library. The following year, she was elected president of the new Equal Suffrage League chapter in Fredericksburg. She held the office until the passage of the 20th Amendment to the U.S. Constitution, which allowed women to vote. Under her leadership, membership grew from about two dozen to several hundred by 1918. The Library of Virginia has digitized many records related to the Equal Suffrage League.

She attended the National American Woman Suffrage Association's conventions as a Virginia delegate in 1912, 1914, and 1917. In 1913, she attended the Woman Suffrage Procession in Washington, DC, as a Virginia delegate. In 1915, Janetta and several other women asked Virginia Governor Henry Carter Stuart at his office for a women's suffrage bill that stalled in the state legislature. The bill passed.

== Later years ==
In 1920, FitzHugh helped organize the Virginia League of Women Voters. Janetta did not marry and lived with her family. She died of cancer in Fredericksburg in 1950.
