= Mary Morris Hall Lockwood =

American suffragist

- Born: Mary Morris Hall; February 28, 1871
- Died: April 19, 1936 (aged 65); Arlington, Virginia
- Occupation: Suffragist

Mary Morris Hall Lockwood (1871 – 1936) was an American suffragist.

== Biography ==
Lockwood née Hall was born on February 28, 1871. In 1889 she married Henry Lockwood with whom she had two children, one dying in infancy. The couple settled in Arlington County, Virginia (then part of Alexandria County, Virginia).

In 1912 Lockwood founded the local branch of the Equal Suffrage League of Virginia which worked towards including suffrage in the Virginia state constitution, but by the next year she had joined the newly formed Congressional Union for Woman Suffrage (CU) which was pursuing an amendment to the federal constitution. From 1913 to 1914 she served as treasurer of the CU. Lockwood marched in the 1913 Woman Suffrage Procession in Washington, D.C. By 1916 the CU had become the National Woman's Party. In 1917 Lockwood was arrested for picketing outside the White House with the Silent Sentinels. She was successful in appealing her sentence.

After the passage of the Nineteenth Amendment in 1920 Townsend ran an unsuccessful bid for a seat in the Virginia House of Delegates.

Lockwood was active in the General Federation of Women's Clubs, founding the Arlington County Federation of Women's Clubs in 1920, and serving a term as president Virginia Federation of Women's Clubs.

In addition to her work as a suffragist and organizer, she participated in civic reform, helping to found Arlington, Virginia's library system, and St. Andrew's Episcopal Church, also in Arlington.

Lockwood died on April 19, 1936, in Arlington. To commemorate her legacy, in 2020 Arlington County placed a historical marker at 1501 North Lincoln Street, next to Arlington Science Focus Elementary School and across from Hayes Park.
