= Edyth Carter Beveridge =

American photojournalist (c. 1862 – 1927)

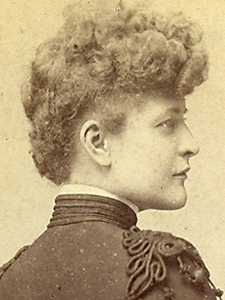
- Born: Edyth Gertrude Carter Beveridge c. 1862; Richmond, Virginia, C.S.A.
- Died: August 29, 1927 (aged 64–65); Richmond, Virginia, U.S.A.
- Known for: Photography

Edyth Gertrude Carter Beveridge (c. 1862 – August 29, 1927) was an American photojournalist. Beveridge documented life in Richmond, Virginia at the turn of the century. Throughout the 1890s she took photographs for the Richmond News and the Richmond Times. Beveridge began authoring the articles that accompanied her photographs. She went on to create photo essays for the Ladies' Home Journal, The Century Magazine, Harper's Weekly, and Collier's.

Her work is in the Library of Congress and the Virginia Historical Society.

== Gallery ==
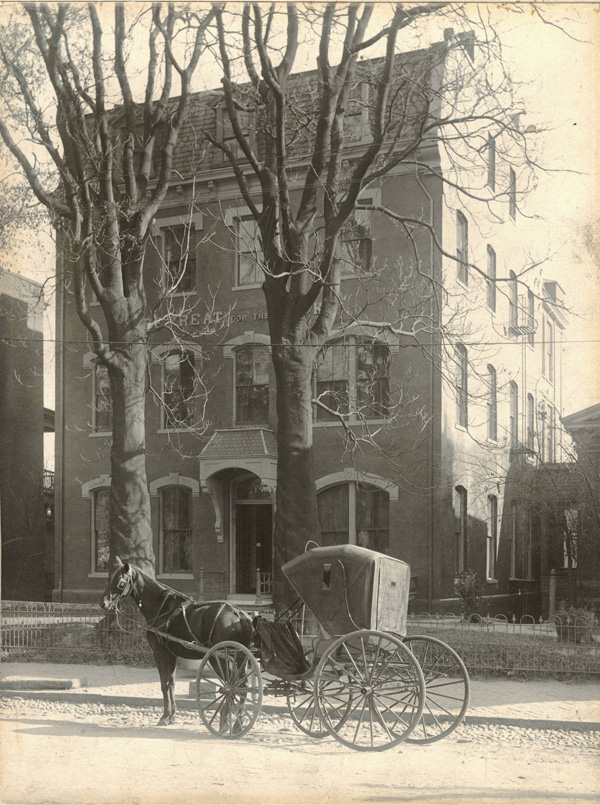
Original Retreat Hospital, Richmond, Va 1883

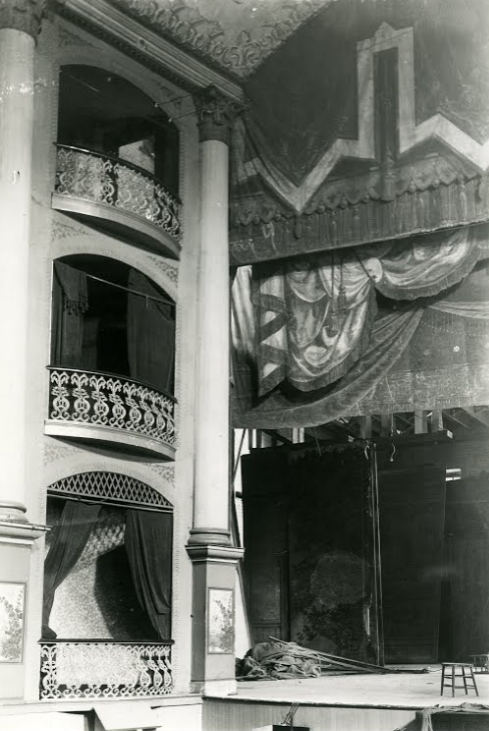
Interior of Richmond Theater, 1890

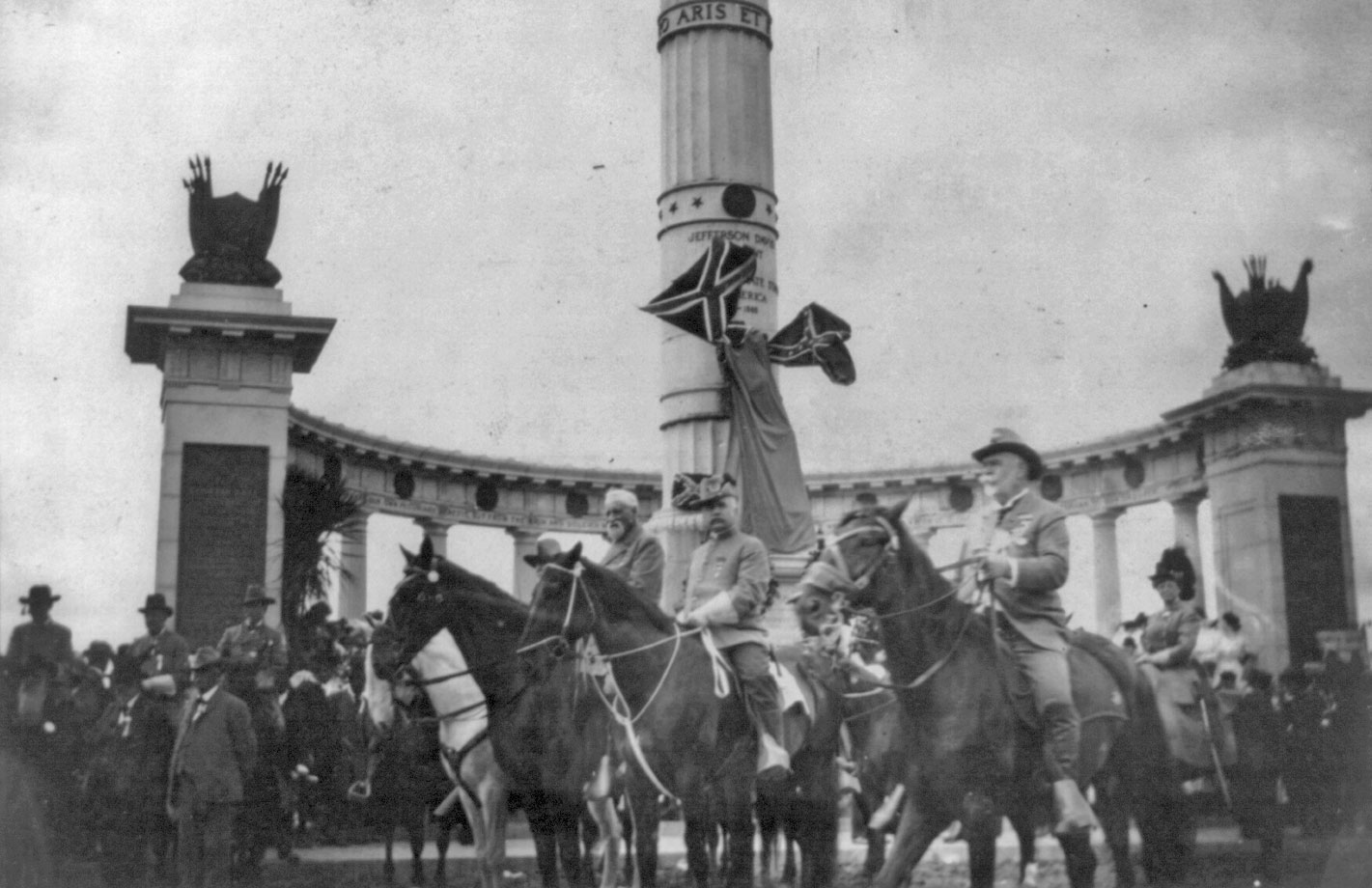
Confederate Reunion Parade Richmond, 1907
