= Adele Goodman Clark =

American painter and suffragist

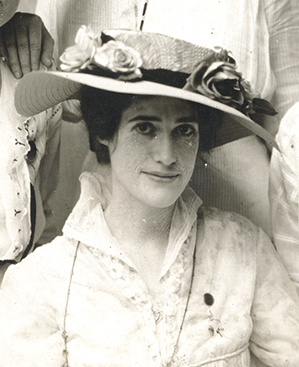
- Clark in 1915
- Born: September 27, 1882; Montgomery, Alabama, U.S.
- Died: June 4, 1983 (aged 100); Richmond, Virginia, U.S.
- Education: Virginia Randolph Ellett School; New York School of Art
- Occupations: Artist, activist
- Partner: Nora Houston
- Parent(s): Robert and Estelle (née Goodman) Clark

Adele Goodman Clark (September 27, 1882 – June 4, 1983) was an American artist and suffragist.

== Early life ==
Clark was born in 1882 in Montgomery, Alabama, to Robert Clark, a railroad worker originally from Belfast, and Estelle Goodman Clark, a Jewish music teacher originally from New Orleans. She was the sister of fellow suffragist Edith Clark Cowles.

The family lived in New Orleans and Pass Christian, Mississippi, before moving to Richmond, Virginia, in 1894. Clark attended the Virginia Randolph Ellett School and, at age 19, worked as a stenographer to fund art classes at the Art Club of Richmond. In 1906, she went to the New York School of Art on a scholarship, studying under artists including Robert Henri, William Merritt Chase, and Kenneth Hayes Miller.

== Activism ==
Clark's activist career began in 1909, when she and 18 other women, including Nora Houston, Ellen Glasgow, Lila Meade Valentine, Kate Waller Barrett, and Mary Johnston, founded the Equal Suffrage League of Virginia; she served as its secretary for one year, and also as a committee chair and head of the group's lobby in the Virginia General Assembly.

In 1910, she was a delegate to the National American Woman Suffrage Association convention in Washington, D.C. Clark and Nora Houston would set up also set up their easels at the corner of Fifth and Broad Streets in downtown Richmond to share their "street corner sketches"—chalk drawings on rolls of paper that illustrated their oratory. "Lots of people made speeches, but we were the only ones sketching, and that really drew crowds," Clark once remembered. During their chalk talks, Clark and Houston spoke about women's suffrage and handed out leaflets to people who approached.

When the Art Club of Richmond dissolved in 1917, Clark and Houston opened a studio together. The professional space became known as the "Atelier," and its class offerings—including art history, painting, and drawing—fostered the talents of a new generation of artists, including the painter Theresa Pollak. Two years later, Clark and Houston founded the Virginia Academy of Fine Arts and Handicrafts. In the months before the 1920 elections, when there were threats and rumors of spurious challenges against black women voters, Clark and Houston invited black leaders to their studio to plan ways to confront the issue. They decided that the white suffragists would patrol polling locations in cars. Clark and Houston continued to be involved in the interracial movement after this election. They also participated in art-related activism, campaigning for the resurrection of the Academy of Sciences and Fine Arts, which opened in 1930 as the Richmond Academy of Arts and later became the Virginia Museum of Fine Arts.

When women were given the vote in 1920, the Equal Suffrage League became the Virginia League of Women Voters, and Clark was its first chair before becoming president the next year. She was its president from 1921 to 1925, and then again from 1929 to 1944. Clark was elected to the board of the National League of Women Voters in 1924 as a regional director, and in 1925 she was elected Second Vice-president, a position she held until 1928. Also in 1928, Clark and Houston bought a house together on Chamberlayne Avenue in Richmond, which came to be known as "The Brattery."

=== Government and educational positions ===
Clark also held positions in a number of government and educational bodies, including secretary of Governor E. Lee Trinkle's Commission on the Simplification of State and Local Government and of Governor Harry F. Byrd's Liberal Arts College for Women Commission, and dean of women at the College of William and Mary. During the New Deal, she was a field supervisor for the National Reemployment Service before becoming, in 1936, the director of the Virginia Arts Project in the Works Progress Administration.

She was on the Virginia Arts Commission from 1941 to 1964, having helped establish it in 1916. Clark, who also put her campaign for women's suffrage into her artistic work, commented that her art and her activism were related, saying, "I've always tried to combine my interest in art with my interest in government."

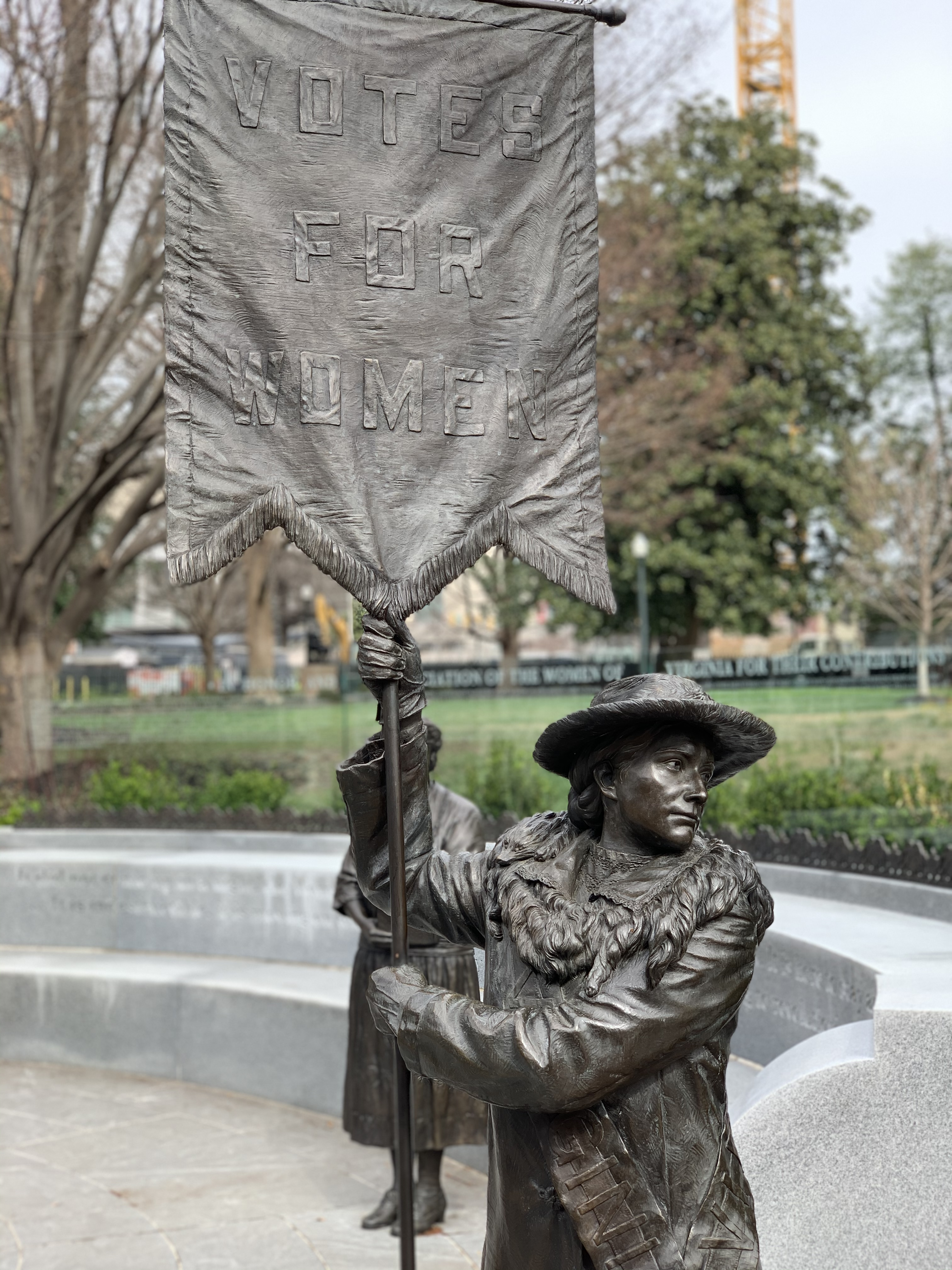
Statue of Adele Clark included in the Virginia Women's Monument.

== Personal life ==
She met fellow artist Nora Houston at the Art School of Richmond, where she had previously taken classes under Lillie Logan and where she taught after returning to Virginia. Houston became Clark's life partner until her death in 1942. Soon after Nora Houston died in 1942, Clark's cousin Willoughby Ions, also an artist, moved in with Clark at the Chamberlayne Avenue house she had shared with Houston.

Clark, an Episcopalian, converted to Roman Catholicism, Houston's religion, on November 21, 1942. Clark chaired the Richmond Diocesan Council of Catholic Women's Legislative Committee from 1949 to 1959. She continued to be outspoken on political issues, opposing the Equal Rights Amendment in the belief that it was unnecessary.

Clark died in a retirement community in Richmond, Virginia, on June 4, 1983, aged 100.

== See also ==
- List of suffragists and suffragettes
