= Alice Overbey Taylor =

American suffragist (1879–1919)

Alice B. Overbey Taylor
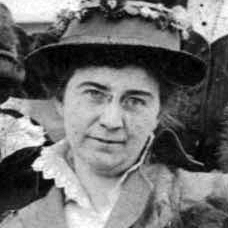
- Born: Alice B. Overbey; July 28, 1879; Charlotte County, Virginia, U.S.
- Died: December 29, 1919 (aged 40); Richmond, Virginia, U.S.
- Resting place: Chase City, Virginia, U.S.
- Known for: Suffragist, author

Alice B. Overbey Taylor (July 28, 1879 – December 29, 1919) was an American suffragist. She was the manager of the short-lived Virginia Suffrage News.

== Biography ==
Taylor née Overbey was born on July 28, 1879, in Charlotte County, Virginia. On 20 September 1909 she married Doward Miles Taylor. The couple settled in Richmond, Virginia In the early 1910s Overbey became active in the suffragist movement. She was a member of the Equal Suffrage League of Virginia, serving as executive secretary and office manager from 1913 thorough 1915. In 1915 Taylor had a short story published in the American Home Journal. Around 1917, at the start of World War I, the Equal Suffrage League of Virginia added support of the American troops to their agenda. Taylor was appointed chair of the Committee of Agriculture and Thrift for the league. In 1918 Taylor became the league's chair of the Committee for the Protection of Women's Labor. The following year she was named program chair for the Richmond chapter of the Equal Suffrage League.

Taylor died of cancer on December 29, 1919, in Richmond. She was buried in Chase City.

=== Virginia Suffrage News ===
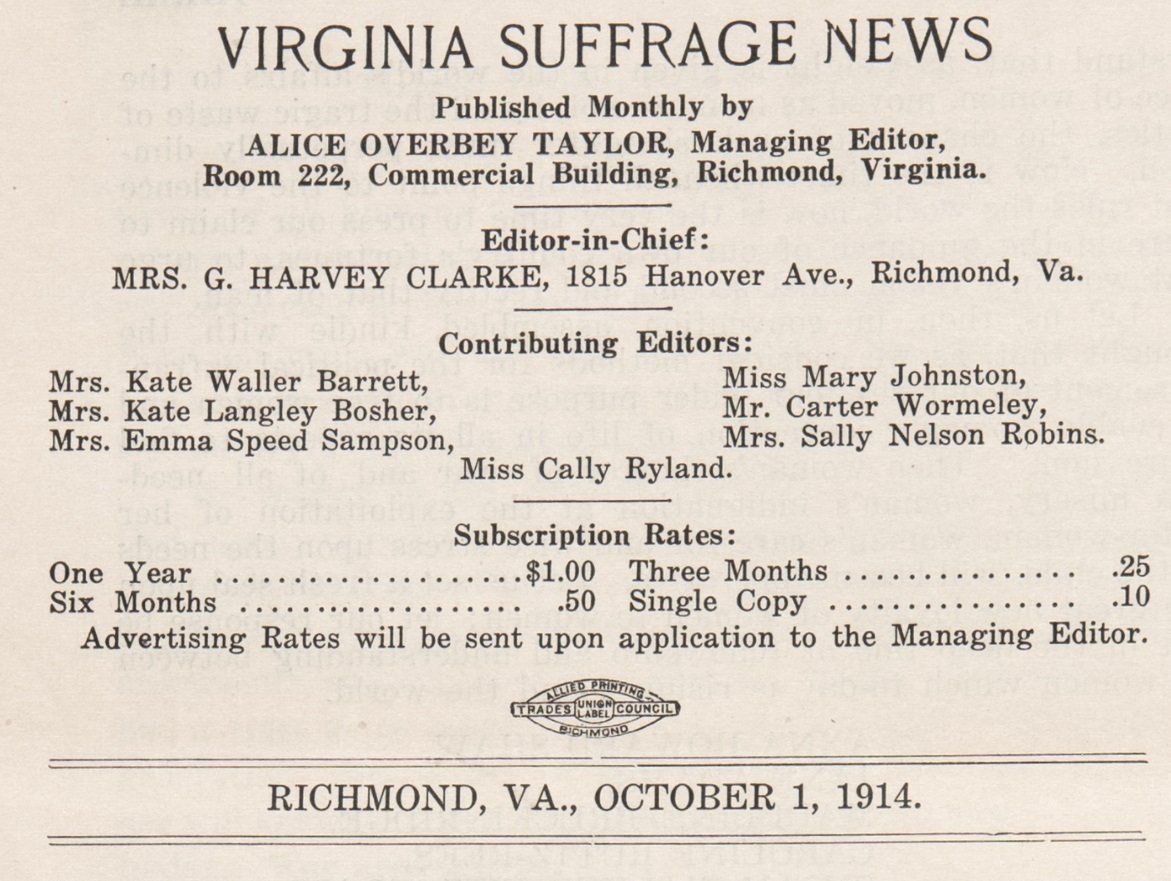
Virginia Suffrage News, first edition, October 1, 1914

In 1914 Overbey created and funded the publication the Virginia Suffrage News. Taylor served as publisher and manager. Fellow suffragist Mary Ellen Pollard Clarke served as editor-in-chief. The first issue was published in Richmond on October 1, 1914, as the official organ of the Equal Suffrage League of Virginia. Due to Taylor's poor health, and lack of funding, the Virginia Suffrage News had only three issues, from October 1, 1914, through December 1, 1914.
