= Hill Montague =

American politician (1866–1952)

Hill Montague (Dec 29, 1866 – June 29, 1952) was a Virginia lawyer and politician.

Montague was born in 1866 in Gloucester County, Virginia. He attended the University of Virginia and Richmond College, graduating with a law degree. After graduating from law school, Montague was admitted to the Virginia bar and a member of the law firm of Montague and Dawson. In 1894, Montague married Mary Meade Winston. They had three children.

He was a member of the Odd Fellows and was the Grand Warden of the organization's Grand Lodge of Virginia, later serving as the Independent Order of Odd Fellows' national president. In 1907, Montague was elected to the Virginia House of Delegates, serving from 1908 to 1915. In 1912, Montague introduced an amendment to the Virginia constitution granting women the right to vote.

Montague died on June 29, 1959, in Richmond, Virginia, at the age of 92. He is buried at Hollywood Cemetery.
