= Lila Meade Valentine =

American education reformer, healthcare advocate, and suffragist (1865–1921)

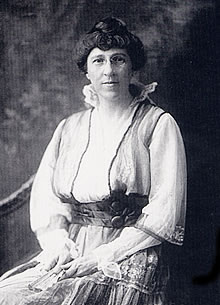
- Portrait of Lila Meade Valentine, circa 1910
- Born: February 4, 1865; Richmond, Virginia, U.S.
- Died: July 14, 1921 (aged 56); Richmond, Virginia, U.S.
- Occupations: Education and health care reformer, suffragist
- Spouse: Benjamin Batchelder Valentine

Lila Meade Valentine (born Lila Hardaway Meade; February 4, 1865 – July 14, 1921) was an American education reformer, healthcare advocate, and one of the main leaders of her state's participation in the woman's suffrage movement in the United States. She worked to improve public education through her co-founding and leadership of the Richmond Education Association, and advocated for public health by founding the Instructive Visiting Nurses Association, through which she helped eradicate tuberculosis from the Richmond area.

Valentine co-founded the Equal Suffrage League of Virginia and served as its first president. Under her leadership the league began a campaign to educate Virginia's citizens and legislators on the topic of women's suffrage and brought the issue to the floor of the General Assembly three times between the years 1912 and 1916. Within 10 years of its founding, the Equal Suffrage League of Virginia became the largest political organization in the state.

When Valentine's legislative efforts proved unsuccessful at the state level, she focused her attention on the passage of the Nineteenth Amendment, seeing it become law shortly before her death.

== Early life, education, and marriage ==
Lila Meade Valentine was born Lila May Hardaway Meade in Richmond, Virginia, on February 4, 1865, the second daughter in a family of five children born to Richard Hardaway Meade and Jane Catherine "Kate" Fontaine Meade. Her father was the co-founder of Meade & Baker Apothecary, which became the largest apothecary in the city of Richmond.

Valentine was an avid reader and spent hours in her father's library. Her family was well-off and provided her with a formal education commensurate with her societal standing, but she wished to attend college. However, at the time, most universities in Virginia did not admit women, and Valentine would never go on to receive a degree.

On October 25, 1886, at age 21, she married Benjamin Batchelder Valentine at Monumental Episcopal Church. Benjamin, known as B.B., was a banker, insurance executive, writer, and member of the prosperous Valentine family; his father, Mann S. Valentine II, eventually donated funds to found The Valentine. Their marriage was a happy one, and B.B. actively supported Valentine's advocacy work. B.B. also helped supplement her education by hiring tutors from the University of Virginia and the University of Richmond.

Valentine challenged societal conventions of the time by not using her married name, Mrs. B.B. Valentine, when writing letters.

She and her husband had a stillborn child in 1888 but had no surviving children. She never fully regained her health after the birth and a subsequent surgery; she suffered attacks of indigestion and migraines for the remainder of her life.

== Advocacy and reform ==
=== Education reform ===
In 1892, the Valentines embarked on a prolonged stay abroad. B.B. had business obligations in England, and he hoped the change in scenery would improve his wife's health and disposition; her illnesses did not allow her to be as active as she would have liked. While in England, Valentine was inspired by the ideas of Gladstonian liberalism, and took particular note of how women participated in reforming British society. She returned to Richmond ready to fight for universal education.

==== Richmond Education Association ====
In response to the inequities she saw in Virginia's education system, Valentine worked with other Richmond-area activists like Mary-Cooke Branch Munford to co-found the Richmond Education Association (REA); the founding took place in Valentine's home in 1900. The REA's mission was to improve the quality of public schools in the city and to work towards removing the obstacles preventing poor, African American, and female children from accessing a high quality education.

Valentine served as REA president from 1900 to 1904, during which time the organization led initiatives to improve teacher training; increase teacher pay; bring kindergarten and vocational training into city schools; and construct public playgrounds.

In 1901, the REA created a Kindergarten Training School. The organization went on to lobby Richmond's city council to establish a kindergarten program in city schools. When the first kindergarten opened in 1903, Richmond's school board named it the Valentine Kindergarten in Lila Meade Valentine's honor.

During her tenure as REA president, Valentine, with Munford, led the charge in replacing Richmond's only high school at the time, which had never been renovated since its construction in 1879. By speaking out about the filthy, hazardous, rat-infested school—and inviting reporters on a tour to document the conditions—Valentine helped secure a $600,000 appropriation for the construction of John Marshall High School. The school opened in 1909 on the current site of the John Marshall Courts Building in downtown Richmond.

==== Southern Education Board ====
In 1902, Valentine traveled to Athens, Georgia, to attend the annual conference of the Southern Education Board, which worked for better funding and higher education standards in Southern schools. The conference—and her conversations with Robert Curtis Ogden, a Northern businessman and then-head of the Southern Education Board—energized Valentine and left her adamant that the Board should meet the following year in Richmond.

Valentine wanted the 1903 meeting of the Southern Education Board to address the educational challenges faced by poor whites and African Americans—a topic she knew would draw ire from some of her fellow Southerners. She also knew they may be leery of any organization with Northern leadership. She held several citizen meetings where she, with the help of other education advocates, explained how the Southern Education Board could help Richmond.

Her efforts proved successful. On April 22, 1903, the Southern Education Board met in Richmond in what was one of the first racially integrated meetings in the city since the Civil War. A Richmond Times-Dispatch article from April 25, 1903, stated: "A notable fact about the audience last night was that for the first time, so far as known, in the post-bellum history of Richmond, whites and blacks sat side by side in the same public hall, with no line of demarkation [sic]."

==== Cooperative Education Association ====
Valentine's work with the REA and the Southern Education Board helped make educational reform a more popular issue across the state of Virginia. In March 1904, less than a year after Richmond hosted the Southern Education Board conference, she was commissioned along with Governor Andrew J. Montague and Joseph W. Southall, superintendent of public instruction, to establish a permanent committee dedicated to raising the standards of private and public education and advocating for the cause of universal education across the state. They named the committee the Cooperative Education Association of Virginia. Valentine was the only woman selected to serve on this executive committee.

==== Continuing her education advocacy ====
After her appointment to the Cooperative Education Association of Virginia, Valentine sought to bring even more attention to the education challenges Virginia was facing, speaking to any civic organization that would have her. In her speeches she called for public investment in improved educational facilities, playgrounds, and vocational training for Virginia's children.

In a 1904 speech to the REA Valentine said:

"Let each one of us...make it our business to convince our neighbors that it pays to educate the children of every class...that Richmond can never be the great and beautiful city we all wish her to be until her schools are so equipped as to train her boys and girls to be efficient, productive, law-abiding, beauty-loving citizens of the future."

Valentine and Mary-Cooke Branch Munford were also active in the "May Campaign" of 1905 during which pro-school reform speakers traveled the state, giving more than 300 speeches at 108 meetings in 94 counties. More than 50 local education leagues were founded as a result of this effort, most of them led by women.

=== Health care reform ===
Valentine's work in public schools made her aware of the need for improved access to health care, as she saw children suffering from treatable illnesses. In January 1902 at the area Woman's Club, Valentine heard Sadie Heath Cabiness, director of nurses at Old Dominion Hospital, speak about her work establishing the Nurses' Settlement two years earlier and the importance of teaching patients about hygiene, nutrition, and home care in efforts to lower hospital readmission rates. Cabiness also shared the ongoing struggles she and her volunteer nurses faced in raising financial support and public buy-in of their work.

==== Instructive Visiting Nurses Association ====
Inspired by Cabiness's work, Valentine convened a group of women in her home three weeks later to hear about these nurses' experiences. The gatherings led to the founding of the Instructive Visiting Nurses Association (IVNA).

The IVNA served Richmond's lower-income residents to ensure their access to health care. Within IVNA's first year, Valentine successfully lobbied Richmond's city council to provide funds to cover the salary for a nurse to oversee the nursing care at Richmond's almshouse, the City Home; prior to this development, residents had to rely one another for care. In 1903 the IVNA began sending nurses into Richmond's schools.

==== Eradicating tuberculosis ====
By 1904, Richmond was facing a tuberculosis epidemic. Valentine was elected president of the IVNA in order to oversee the organization's campaign to help eradicate the disease. She worked with the Board of Health to establish two fully staffed tuberculosis clinics—one for whites and one for blacks—which greatly reduced the number of new cases of the disease. From there, Valentine and Sadie Heath Cabiness tackled the issue of lower-income sufferers of the disease who could not gain admission to hospitals or access to treatment, leaving them both incurable and likely to spread the disease. Valentine and Cabiness established the Anti-Tuberculosis Auxiliary (a subsidiary of the IVNA), which led to the opening of Pine Camp Tuberculosis Hospital in 1910. At Pine Camp, tuberculosis patients at all stages of the disease received specialized treatment.

The IVNA's effort to eradicate tuberculosis became a model for other health advocates and reformers throughout the state of Virginia. Valentine urged IVNA's board to make its nurses available to any Virginia locality that wanted to found its own branch of the Instructive Visiting Nurses Association.

== Women's suffrage ==
Valentine's demanding schedule took its toll on her health, forcing her to step down from her leadership positions with the REA and IVNA in 1904. In 1905, she and her husband relocated to England where she became aware of the issue of women's suffrage. Valentine's time abroad allowed her to witness the work of radical suffragists in England while also observing the problems back in America with a wider lens. Seeing little legislative urgency to solve the ongoing challenges of education, public health, and child labor, Valentine concluded that giving women the right to vote would facilitate reform in these arenas.

=== Equal Suffrage League of Virginia ===
==== Early days and growing numbers ====
In November 1909, Valentine co-founded the Equal Suffrage League of Virginia and was elected president. Fellow league co-founders included artists Adele Goodman Clark and Nora Houston; physician Kate Waller Barrett; and writers Ellen Glasgow, Kate Langley Bosher, and Mary Johnston. Months later, under Valentine's direction, the league joined forces with the National American Woman Suffrage Association (NAWSA).

At the time NAWSA was using "practical politics" to make the argument for suffrage; they organized by electoral districts to orchestrate major publicity campaigns and put pressure on politicians. The approach proved difficult for the Virginia suffragists as they faced intense public apathy; as a result, they switched tactics, believing that education would be the only way to make suffrage a viable political issue in their state. The league began its public campaign to educate Virginia's citizens and legislators about equal suffrage by canvassing house to house, distributing leaflets, renting booths at fairs, making speeches, and holding street meetings in Richmond's Capitol Square.

In 1912, Valentine met with several of Richmond's most prominent businessmen and convinced them to found the Men's Equal Suffrage League of Virginia.

The Equal Suffrage League of Virginia saw its membership increase to nearly 120 in the first year. By 1911 the league opened an office at 802 East Broad Street; Richmond became the home of the league's state headquarters. By 1914 there were 45 local chapters; by 1915 there were 115; and by 1919, the Equal Suffrage League of Virginia had become the largest political organization in the state of Virginia.

==== Virginia Suffrage News ====
In October 1914, the Equal Suffrage League of Virginia published its first issue of Virginia Suffrage News, a monthly newspaper intended to open communication among the suffrage leagues and their supporters across the state of Virginia. As league president, Valentine wrote the foreword to the first issue, in which she articulated her desire for cooperation and harmony within Virginia's suffrage movement:

"The movement for enfranchisement of woman has become so widespread in Virginia that there is great need for a regular means of communication between workers and sympathizers in all parts of the State. For this is a pre-eminently a co-operative movement—one in which good teamwork is required—one in which we must all pull together with a right good will. To do this effectively, we need the stimulus of the exchange of ideas, we need to inform ourselves of the activities of our local leagues, as well of the larger movement outside. To meet these needs, I commend to the suffragist of the State the 'Virginia Suffrage News,' which should bind us together in one harmonious whole, and I bespeak for it a wide circulation amongst all those interested in this next great step in the development of women."

==== Marginalizing African American women ====
Valentine and members of the Equal Suffrage League privately supported women's suffrage for all, regardless of race. Publicly, however, they marginalized black women, knowing that most Virginian's would be against giving African American women the vote, thereby jeopardizing any chance of achieving women's suffrage. In 1916 the league issued a flier arguing that giving white women the right to vote would preserve white supremacy and that the literacy test and poll tax would deter blacks from voting.

Valentine argued that refraining from supporting African American women's suffrage was a matter of common sense. In a letter to a friend she wrote:

"I believe that all women, white or black, who meet the qualifications for suffrage in any State should have that right, but in working to secure that right, we should exercise common sense, and not complicate our efforts and add difficulties of the task by injecting elements of discord. As you know, the negro is the one remaining argument against suffrage in the Southern States . . . This is not a matter of principle but of expediency."

=== Life as a public suffragist ===
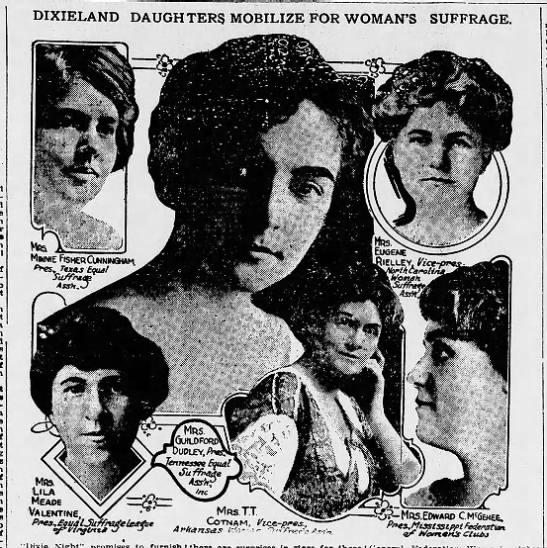
Image from September 1, 1916, edition of Grand Forks Herald showing Valentine alongside fellow southern American women's suffragists

Valentine preferred a "quiet, educational propaganda" approach to organizing support for the suffrage movement; militant and extremist strategies were said to anger her. Public speaking did not come naturally to Valentine, but she understood its importance to the cause. She developed a style that combined a dramatic flair with a fluency with language and a command of facts, winning many over to the cause through her tact and charm.

Valentine quickly earned a reputation for being an engaging speaker, addressing crowds on the topic of women's suffrage whenever the opportunity presented itself and usually without prepared remarks—just minimal notes. From 1912 to 1913, she gave more than a hundred speeches in support of women's suffrage across the state, including one to the Virginia House of Delegates. The National Woman Suffrage Association soon called on her to deliver speeches in New Jersey, North Carolina, Pennsylvania, South Carolina, and West Virginia.

While Valentine's efforts earned her praise among those who shared her views, she did face personal and public backlash. Those she once called friends would ignore her when they saw her on the street. When she spoke publicly, she was often heckled. During one of her speeches at the Fairfax Courthouse the crowd was doused with pepper.

=== Strategic changes and the Nineteenth Amendment ===
When she first entered the women's suffrage movement, Valentine believed votes for women in the United States would be achieved by individual state legislatures passing their own amendments in support of the cause—in fact, she favored an amendment to Virginia's constitution rather than the United States Constitution. When the Equal Suffrage League was first founded in 1909, members agreed to draw a petition calling for a women's suffrage amendment to the state constitution to be presented to the General Assembly in 1912.

On January 19, 1912, Valentine and fellow Virginia suffragists appeared before Virginia's House of Delegates to speak in favor of their petition. The hearing lasted from 4:00 pm until midnight, and while observers were impressed by Valentine's oratorical skills, the legislature did not pass the amendment.

Virginia suffragists brought the issue of women's voting rights to the floor of the General Assembly in 1912, 1914, and 1916, but a women's suffrage amendment never passed. After the failure in 1916, Valentine and others turned their focus to fighting for an amendment to the U.S. Constitution. By 1918 Valentine personally supported the Susan B. Anthony Amendment. Valentine's support of a federal amendment opened her up to new criticism from those who supported states' rights.

After the United States Congress passed the Nineteenth Amendment, Valentine and the Equal Suffrage League of Virginia fought for ratification. Despite their efforts, and faced with pressure from groups like the Virginia Association Opposed to Woman Suffrage, the General Assembly refused to ratify the Nineteenth Amendment, making Virginia one of nine southern states that would not give women the right to vote. Virginia's General Assembly did not vote to ratify the amendment until 1952. However, the Nineteenth Amendment became law in August 1920 after 36 states voted to ratify it.

== Final works, death, and legacy ==
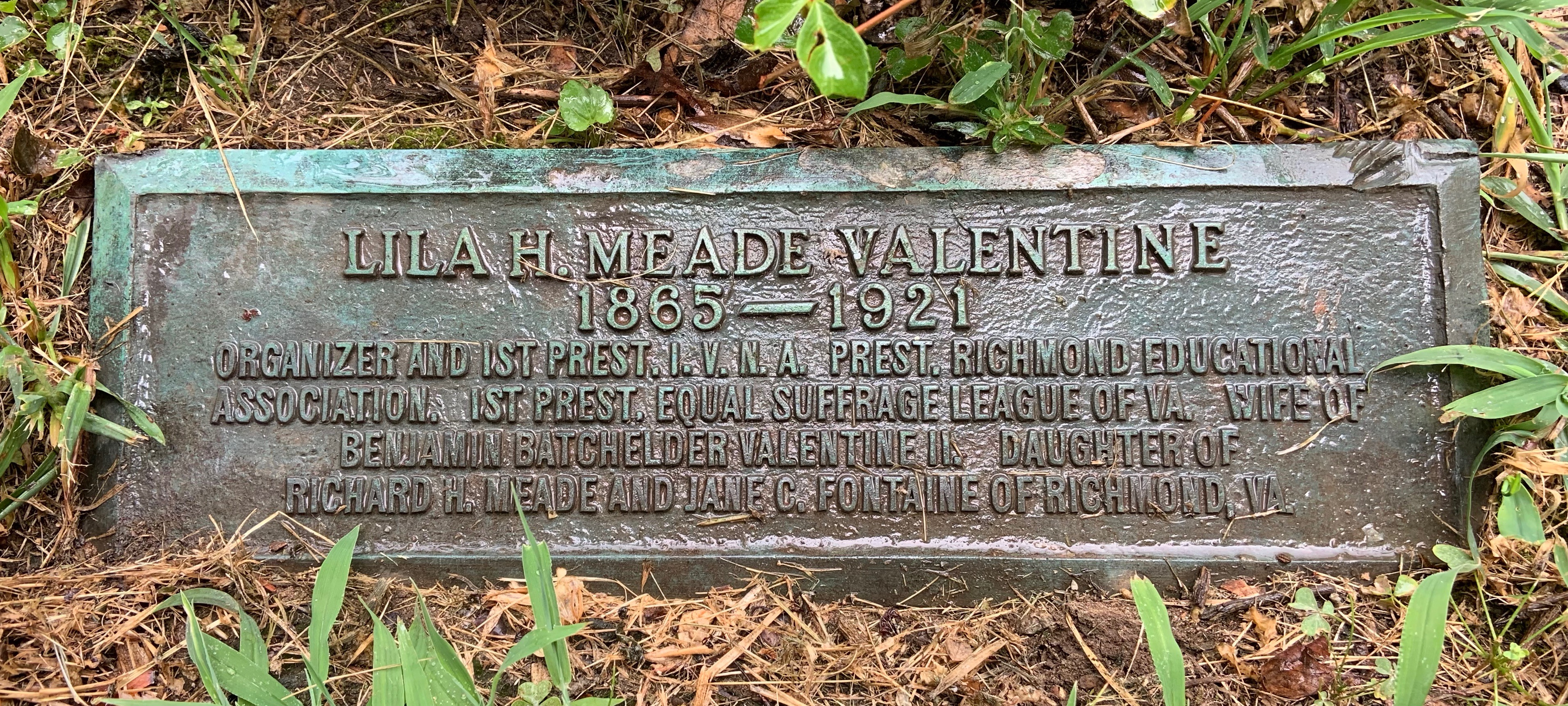
Valentine's grave marker, located in Hollywood Cemetery, Richmond, Virginia, U.S.

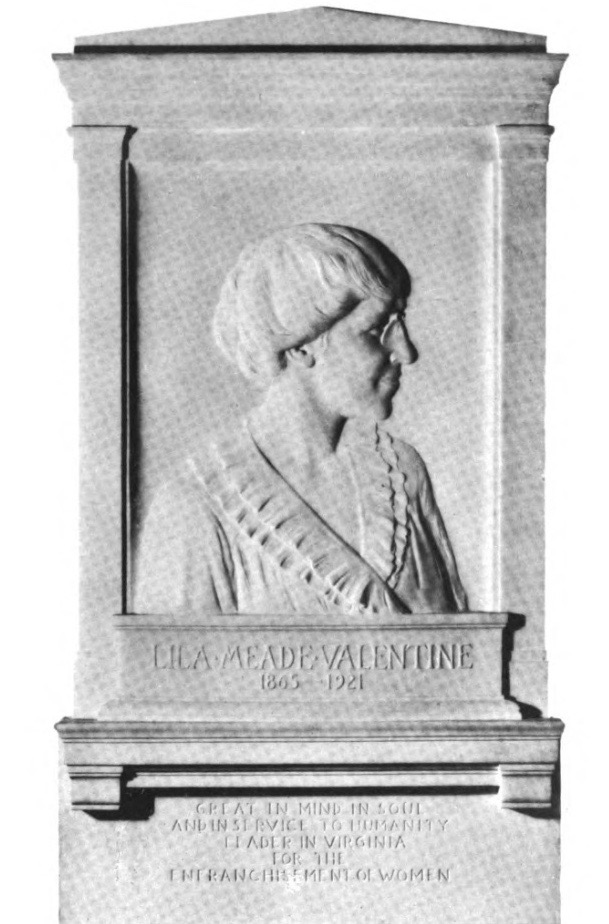
Harriet Whitney Frishmuth's marble bas-relief portrait of Valentine, on display at the Virginia State Capitol, Richmond, Virginia, U.S.

On June 10, 1919, less than a week after Congress passed the Nineteenth Amendment, Valentine's husband, B.B., died after a series of heart attacks. She retreated to Northeast Harbor, Maine, with two of her sisters for a time, but she found comfort in her work towards suffrage and a new-found passion for educating women about the functions of government. She reached out to the University of Virginia and successfully proposed a three-day conference on government for newly enfranchised women, which took place in April 1920 in Charlottesville. From there she began work on a civics curriculum for Virginia's public educational institutions.

Around this time, Valentine's always delicate health steadily declined. By the time suffrage was achieved she was in what co-suffragist, writer, and friend Ellen Glasgow called "her last illness". Valentine registered to vote from her bed, but was too sick to go to the polls.

Valentine died at 12:15 pm on July 14, 1921, at St. Luke's hospital, without ever casting a ballot. She was 56 years old.

Valentine's memorial service was held at Monumental Episcopal Church where she had been married 25 years earlier; the church was filled to capacity for the service. Women served as honorary pallbearers at her funeral—the first in the history of Richmond.

Valentine was buried at Hollywood Cemetery next to her husband, B.B.

Fellow Equal Suffrage League co-founding member Adele Goodman Clark chaired the Lila Meade Valentine Memorial Foundation in 1927 with the aim of honoring Valentine in the Virginia State Capitol. The General Assembly placed a marble bas-relief portrait by Harriet Whitney Frishmuth of Valentine, presented by the Lila Meade Valentine Memorial Foundation, in the Virginia State Capitol in 1936. She was the first woman to be honored there.

In 2000, Valentine was honored by the Library of Virginia as part of the inaugural class of Virginia Women in History.

Valentine's name is featured on the Wall of Honor on the Virginia Women's Monument, located in Capitol Square in Richmond.
