= Equal Suffrage League of Virginia =

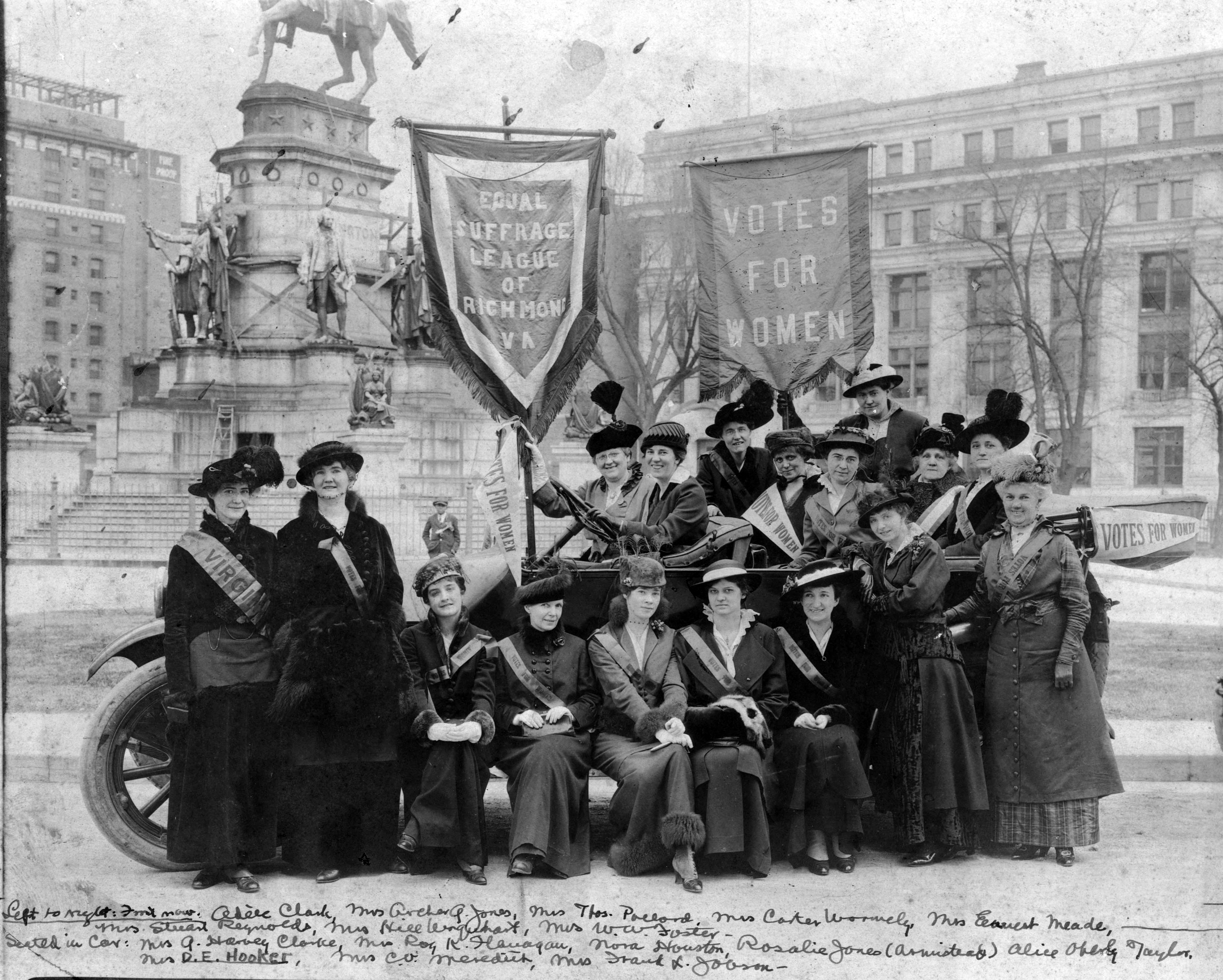
Equal Suffrage League of Richmond, Va., February 1915

The Equal Suffrage League of Virginia was founded in 1909 in Richmond, Virginia. Like many similar organizations in other states, the league's goal was to secure voting rights for women. When the 19th Amendment to the U.S. Constitution was ratified in 1920, enabling women to vote in all states, the Equal Suffrage League dissolved and was reconstituted as Virginia League of Women Voters, associated with the national League of Women Voters. The 19th Amendment was not ratified in Virginia until 1952.

Lila Meade Valentine was the first president and Kate Waller Barrett was vice president. Adele Goodman Clark served as the secretary for one year and headed the group's lobbying efforts in the Virginia General Assembly. Other cofounders included Nora Houston, Ellen Glasgow, and Mary Johnston.

== History ==
=== Founding ===
The Equal Suffrage League of Virginia was formed out of a series of meetings in November 1909 at the home of the Anne Clay Crenshaw, daughter of Kentucky suffragist Mary Jane Warfield Clay. Located at 919 West Franklin Street in Richmond, the home is part of the West Franklin Street Historic District and is listed on the National Register of Historic Places.

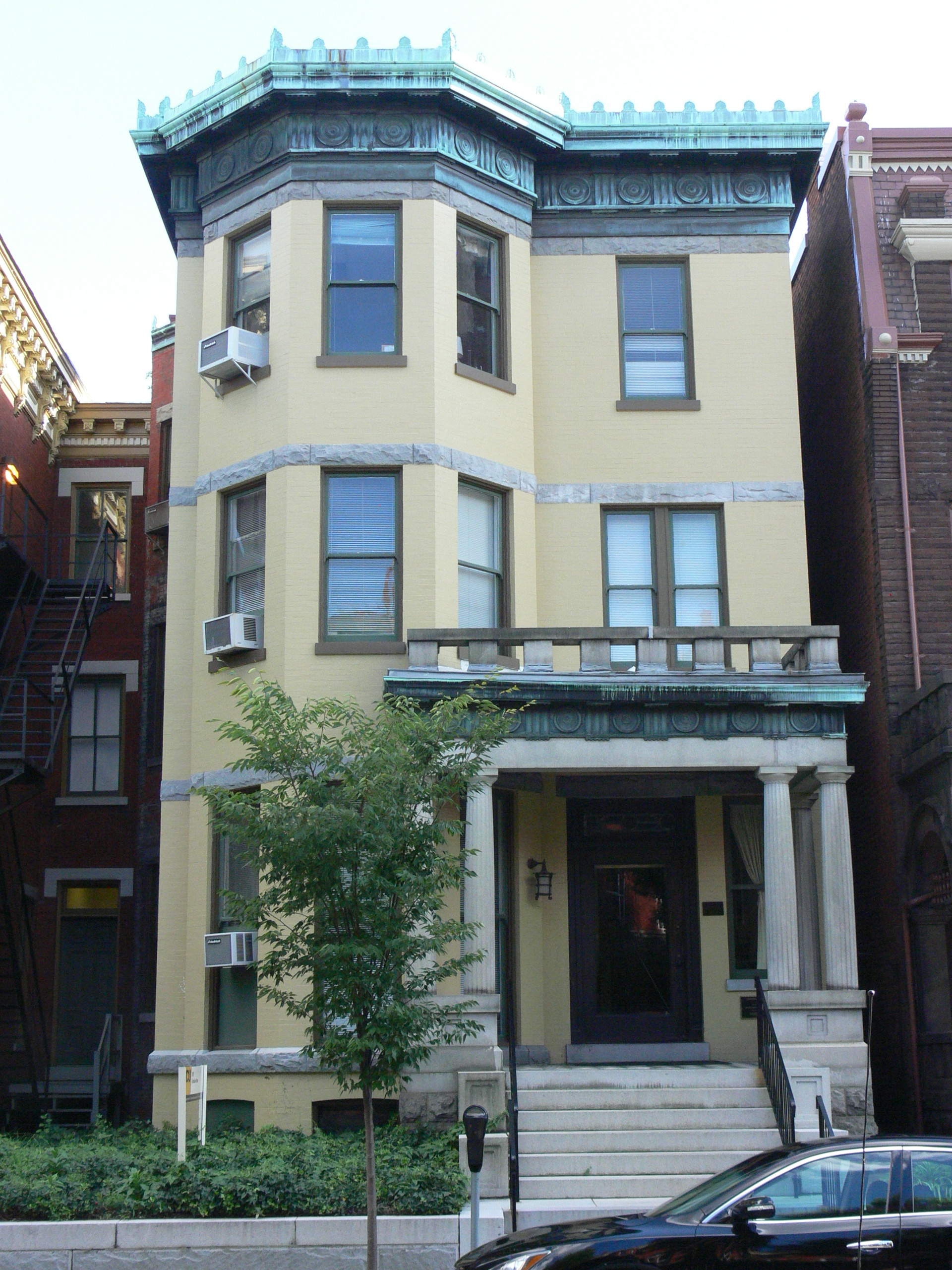
The Crenshaw House at 919 West Franklin Street in Richmond, site of the first meeting of the Equal Suffrage League of Virginia in 1909.

The minutes of the first meeting on November 20 describe the attendees as "women interested in the formation of the Virginia Suffrage League" At a second meeting held one week later, officers and a board of directors were elected. Among the original eighteen founders were Lila Meade Valentine (president), Kate Waller Barrett (vice president), Adele Goodman Clark (secretary), Nora Houston, Ellen Glasgow, and Mary Johnston. In the first year, the league enrolled 120 members, mostly in Richmond. The majority of its members were socially prominent caucasian women who used their political connections and wealth to facilitate the spread of their ideas.

On January 21, 1910, the league hosted their first major public event, a guest lecture by Dr. Anna Howard Shaw, president of the National American Woman Suffrage Association.

=== Opposition ===
By 1909, when the Equal Suffrage League of Virginia was founded, the national suffrage movement had gained considerable traction. The movement lagged behind in Virginia as elsewhere in the South where both supporters and opponents sought to safeguard white dominance. Anti-suffragists argued that extending the vote to women would threaten white hegemony by giving more African Americans the right to vote while supporters of woman suffrage countered, not by condemning white supremacy, but by arguing that woman suffrage would not have a significant racial impact at the polls.

=== Growth ===
Although affiliated with the National American Woman Suffrage Association from the early days, the Equal Suffrage League of Virginia found itself struggling to catch up to the progress of the national movement. Where the NAWSA had moved on to lobbying and direct political activism, the Virginia movement had to focus on education and awareness. Effectively, the ESL was about 20 years behind the national movement, which meant the state initiative was off to a slow start.

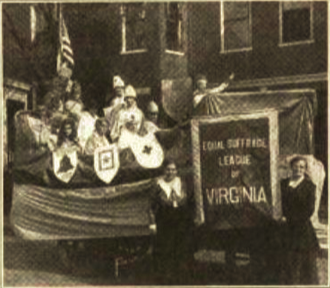
(1918)

Early efforts of the group included canvassing, distributing leaflets, and public speaking events. Leaders across the state visited women’s colleges, schools, fairs, and union meetings. In Richmond, a group of businessmen were encouraged to join the effort and founded the Men’s Equal Suffrage League of Virginia. These efforts paid off in a rapidly expanding movement. By 1914, the league included 45 chapters across the state, a number that increased to 115 by 1916. In 1919, ten years after the founding, the ESL reached 30,000 members. By this time, efforts toward changes in the state constitution intensified with the ESL actively lobbying for an amendment to the state constitution that would permit women to vote.

=== Failure and success ===
Disbanded shortly after the passage of the 19th Amendment in 1920, the Equal Suffrage League of Virginia was reconstituted as the Virginia League of Women Voters. Their stated purpose was to register women voters, to educate them on the issues, and to advocate for social reform. With the passage of the 19th Amendment, women in Virginia gained the right to vote, but the amendment was not ratified by the Virginia General Assembly until 1952.

== Notable members ==
- Adele Goodman Clark
- Mary Johnston
- Lila Meade Valentine
- Elizabeth Langhorne Lewis
- Maud Jamison
- Grace Phillips Pollard

== See also ==
- List of suffragists and suffragettes
