= Economy of Virginia =

- Seal of Virginia

Statistics
- GDP: ▲$759.2 billion
- GDP rank: 13th
- GDP per capita: ▲$86,747
- Population below poverty line: ▼9.49%
- Gini coefficient: 0.456
- Human Development Index: ▲0.930
- Labor force: 4,572,968
- Unemployment: 3.2%

Public finances
- Revenues: ▲$47.7 billion
- Expenses: ▼$50.3 billion

The economy of the Commonwealth of Virginia is well balanced with diverse sources of income. From the Hampton Roads area to Richmond and down to Lee County in the southwest includes military installations, cattle, tobacco and peanut farming in Southside Virginia. Tomatoes recently surpassed soy as the most profitable crop in Virginia. Tobacco, peanuts and hay are also important agricultural products from the commonwealth. Wineries and vineyards in the Northern Neck and along the Blue Ridge Mountains also have become increasingly popular. Northern Virginia (once considered the state's dairy capital) hosts software, communications, consulting, defense contracting, diplomats, and considerable components of the professional government sector. As of the 2000 census, Virginia had the highest number of counties and independent cities (15) in the top 100 wealthiest jurisdictions in the United States based upon median income, in addition, Virginia tied with Colorado as having the most counties (10) in the top 100 based on per capita income. Loudoun and Fairfax counties in Northern Virginia have the highest and second highest median household income, respectively, of all counties in the United States as of 2017.

Virginia, with a GDP of $712.9 billion, ranked as the 13th largest state in terms of GDP among the 50 states of the United States. Virginia's economy is larger than countries such as Belgium, Sweden, Ireland, and Norway. Virginia is also among the wealthiest states in the US, boasting a GDP per capita of $81,794, which ranks 19th as of 2023.

Virginia counties and cities by median family income (2010)

Virginia counties and cities by per capita income (2010)

== Background ==
The state GDP of Virginia was $383 billion in 2007, higher than the larger state of Michigan and comparable to Saudi Arabia. The per capita personal income was $35,477 in 2004. As of 2000, Virginia had the highest number of counties and independent cities, fifteen, in the top one-hundred wealthiest jurisdictions in the United States based upon median income. In addition, Virginia tied with Colorado as having the most counties, ten, in the top one-hundred based on per capita income.

In 2006 and 2007, Forbes magazine voted Virginia as having the best climate for business in the United States citing economic growth, business costs/incentives and quality of life. CNBC ranked Virginia as the top state for business in 2007 as well.

Richmond is one of 12 cities in the country having a Federal Reserve bank. It, along with the New York and San Francisco Federal Reserve banks are the only ones that cover a non-state (Washington, D.C.).

There are seven Fortune 500 companies headquartered in Northern Virginia, and nine in the Richmond area (most of which are within the city itself.) Only five metro areas in the country have more Fortune 500 companies than the Richmond area. Virginia has seventeen total Fortune 500 companies, ranking the state tenth nationwide. Additionally, ten Fortune 1000 companies are in Northern Virginia, with a total of twenty-nine in the state. With only 1% of the Hispanic American population, the state claims 3.6% of Hispanic 500 companies.

Virginia, arguably the wealthiest southern state before the Civil War, recovered from the Civil War and the Great Depression much faster than the rest of the South. Today, Virginia is still one of the wealthiest states in the South. Virginia is also one of twenty-two right-to-work states.

Virginia is also comparable to Alaska and ahead of North Dakota and New Mexico in per capita defense spending.

=== Government ===
Virginia has the highest defense spending of any state per capita, providing the Commonwealth with around 900,000 jobs. Approximately 12% of all U.S. federal procurement money is spent in Virginia, the second-highest amount after California. Many Virginians work for federal agencies in Northern Virginia, which include the Central Intelligence Agency and the Department of Defense, as well as the National Science Foundation, the United States Geological Survey and the United States Patent and Trademark Office. Many others work for government contractors, including defense and security firms, which hold more than 15,000 federal contracts.

Virginia has one of the highest concentrations of veterans of any state, and is second to California in total Department of Defense employees. The Hampton Roads area has the largest concentration of military personnel and assets of any metropolitan area in the world, including the largest naval base in the world, Naval Station Norfolk. In its state government, Virginia employs 106,143 public employees, who combined have a median income of $44,656 as of 2013.

Federal Agencies in Arlington
Agency	Location
Air Force Office of Scientific Research (AFOSR)	Ballston
Army National Guard Readiness Center	George Mason Drive
Bureau of Diplomatic Security	Rosslyn
Defense Advanced Research Projects Agency (DARPA)	Virginia Square
Department of Defense (DOD)	Pentagon
Federal Deposit Insurance Corporation	Virginia Square
Immigration & Naturalization Service (INS)	Ballston
Mine Safety and Health Administration (MSHA)	Rosslyn
National Foreign Affairs Training Center	Route 50
National Guard Bureau	Pentagon
National Science Foundation (NSF)	Ballston
Nuclear Waste Technical Review Board	Courthouse
Office of the Inspector General	Rosslyn
Office of Naval Research (ONR)	Ballston
Transportation Security Administration (TSA)	Pentagon City
US Drug Enforcement Administration (DEA)	Pentagon City
U.S. Fish & Wildlife Service	Ballston
US Marshals Service	Crystal City
US Trade & Development Agency	Rosslyn

Federal Agencies outside of Arlington
Agency	Location
Central Intelligence Agency	McLean
Defense Contract Audit Agency	Fort Belvoir
Defense Logistics Agency	Fort Belvoir
Defense Technical Information Center	Fort Belvoir
Mount Weather Emergency Operations Center	near Bluemont
National Reconnaissance Office	Chantilly
United States Geological Survey (USGS)	Reston
United States Patent and Trademark Office (PTO)	Alexandria

== Arms and aerospace ==
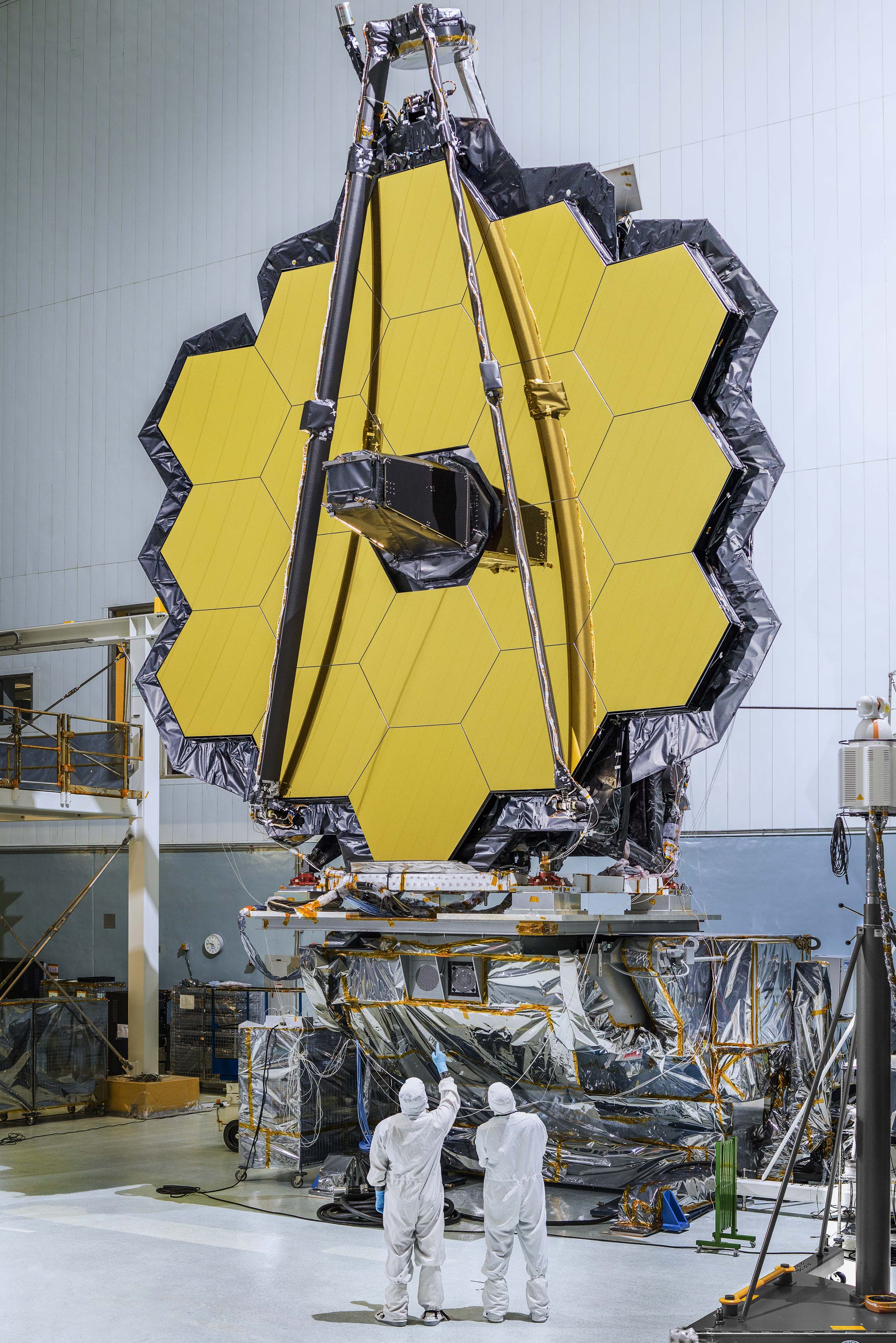
James Webb Space Telescope is manufactured by Northrop Grumman.

Virginia is home to a thriving arms and defense manufacturing industry, with a long history of producing some of the world's most advanced military technology. The state's strategic location on the East Coast of the United States, its robust transportation infrastructure, and its highly skilled workforce make it an ideal location for defense manufacturers.

One of the main reasons why Virginia has a big arms and defense manufacturing industry is its close proximity to Washington, D.C., the center of U.S. military and defense operations. Many defense contractors have established their headquarters or major operations in Northern Virginia to be near key decision-makers and the Pentagon.

In addition to its proximity to the nation's capital, Virginia is also home to several military installations, including the world-renowned Naval Station Norfolk, the largest naval base in the world. The state also has several military research facilities, including the Naval Surface Warfare Center Dahlgren Division, the Naval Air Warfare Center Aircraft Division, and the Defense Advanced Research Projects Agency (DARPA).

These military installations and research facilities have helped Virginia become a hub for defense contractors, who work closely with the military to develop and produce advanced technologies. Some of the top defense contractors with a significant presence in Virginia include Boeing, Northrop Grumman, General Dynamics, and RTX Corporation.

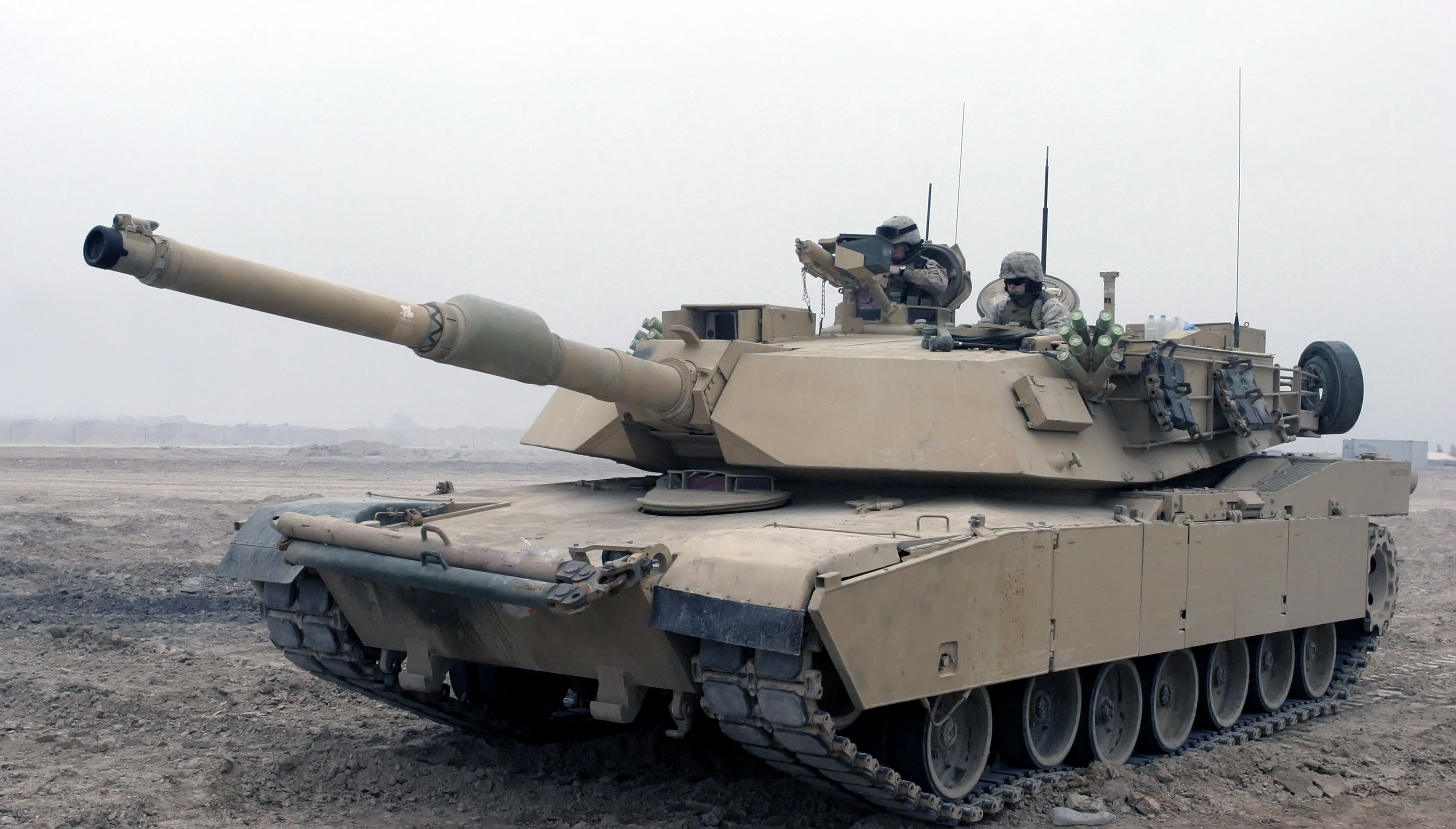
M1 Abrams Tanks are manufactured by General Dynamics.

Virginia's arms and defense manufacturing industry contributes significantly to the state's economy, providing thousands of high-paying jobs and generating billions of dollars in economic activity. In fact, according to the Virginia Economic Development Partnership, the defense industry in Virginia contributes over $36 billion to the state's economy each year and supports over 300,000 jobs.

Overall, Virginia's strong ties to the military, its skilled workforce, and its supportive business environment have made it a leading destination for arms and defense manufacturing companies. As the world's geopolitical landscape continues to evolve, Virginia's position as a hub for military innovation and production is likely to remain secure for many years to come.

== Technology ==
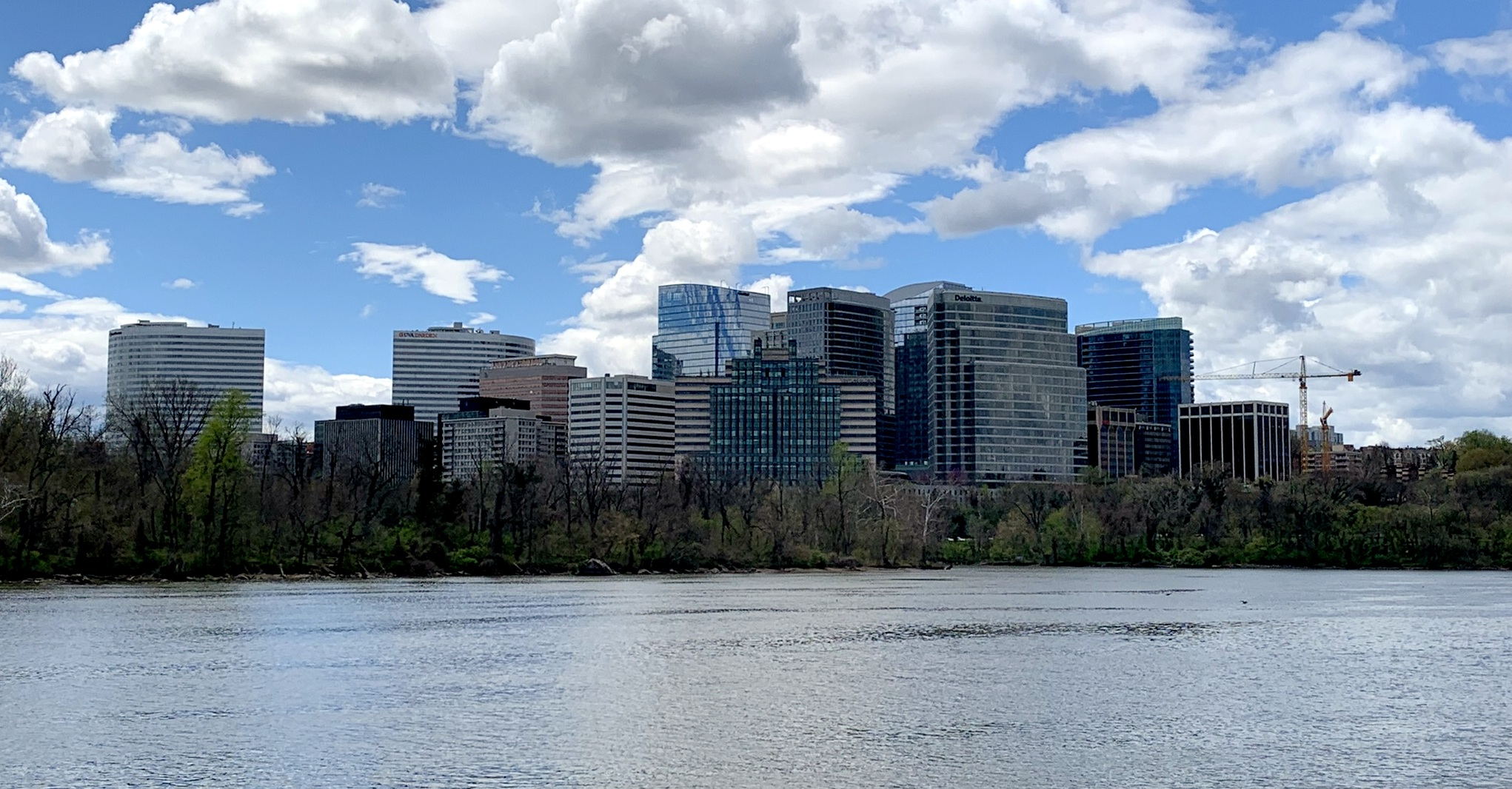
Arlington County skyline

According to the American Electronics Association, Virginia has the highest concentration of technology workers of any state. Computer chips became the state's highest-grossing export in 2006, surpassing its traditional top exports of coal and tobacco, combined. The Dulles Technology Corridor centered on the border of Fairfax County and Loudoun County near Dulles International Airport has a high concentration of Internet, communication technology and software engineering firms.

The state's biotechnology industry is not centralized, but growing, highlighted by the building of the Virginia BioTechnology Research Park biotech incubator in Richmond and the opening of the Howard Hughes Medical Institute's Janelia Farm in Northern Virginia.

Virginia's nanotechnology industry, centered in Hampton Roads and Northern Virginia, accounted for $1 billion in manufactured goods in 2006. Researchers in Hampton Roads, many of whom hold patents in the field, believe the region has an advantage in the commercialization of nanotechnology due to the amount of research, much of it spearheaded by NASA's Langley Research Center.

In September 2017, Amazon announced that it would be building a second headquarters in North America, and immediately, several cities in the United States and Canada began submitting their proposals. After much anticipation, Amazon announced in November 2018 that it had chosen two locations for its second headquarters, with one in New York City and the other in Arlington, Virginia. Amazon chose Virginia and opened its 2nd headquarters in Arlington, Virginia in 2023.

The decision to locate in Arlington, Virginia, was significant for several reasons. Firstly, the area had been a leading contender for the HQ2 project, with its proximity to Washington, D.C., and access to major transportation hubs, making it an attractive location for a major tech company like Amazon. The company announced plans to invest $2.5 billion and create over 25,000 high-paying jobs over the next decade, with a focus on hiring local talent and partnering with local universities to develop training programs.

== Finance and banking ==
Virginia is home to one of the largest banking and finance industries in the United States. The state's location on the East Coast and its proximity to the nation's capital make it an ideal location for financial institutions. Additionally, Virginia's business-friendly environment and highly educated workforce attract many financial companies to the state.

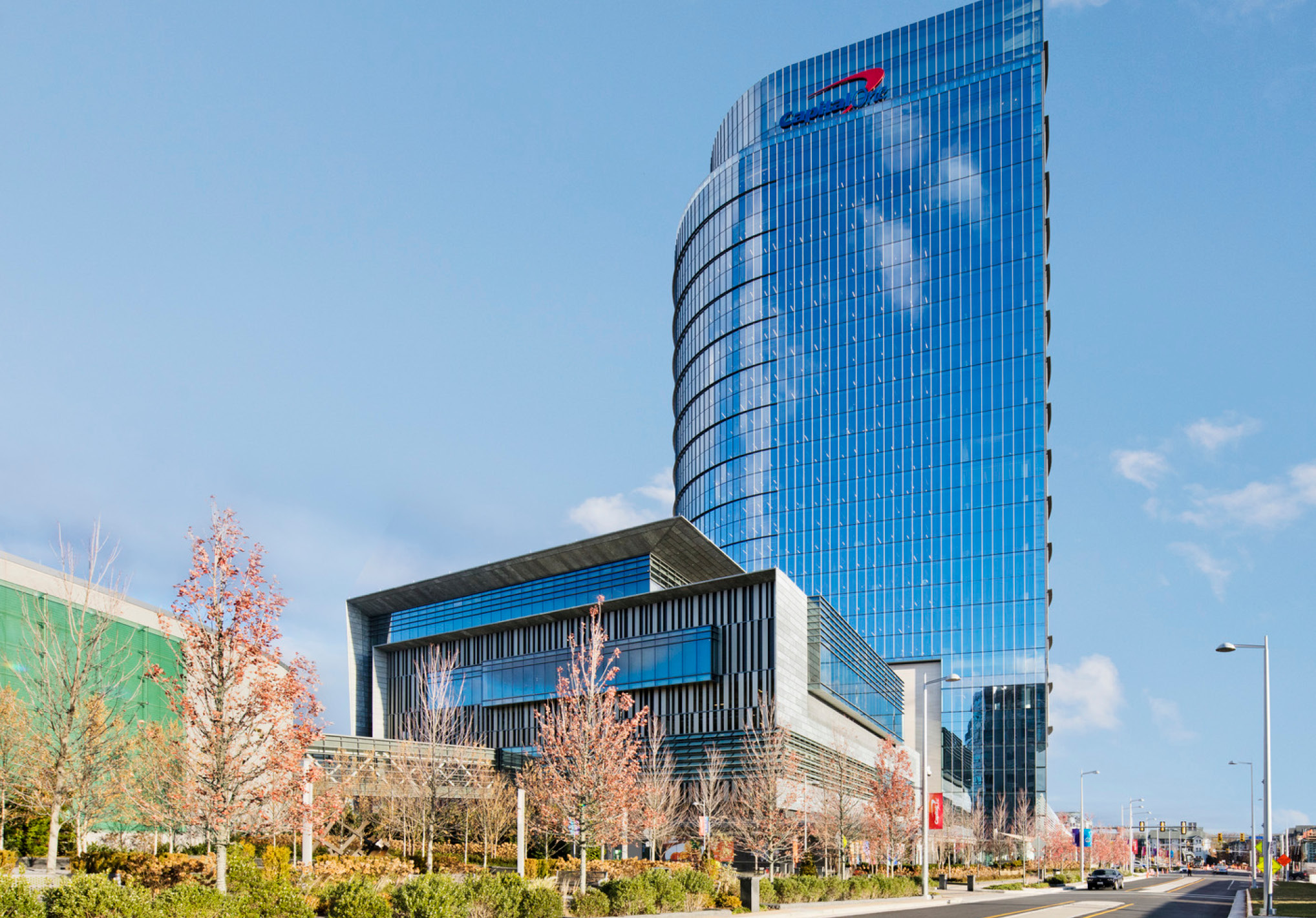
Capital One World Headquarters in Tysons, Virginia

Two of the most prominent financial institutions located in Virginia are Freddie Mac and Capital One. Freddie Mac, which stands for Federal Home Loan Mortgage Corporation, is a government-sponsored enterprise that buys and securitizes mortgages in order to provide liquidity to the mortgage market. The company is headquartered in McLean, Virginia, and has been a major player in the mortgage industry since it was created in 1970.

Capital One is a Fortune 500 company that provides a wide range of financial products and services, including credit cards, loans, and banking. The company was founded in 1988 and is headquartered in McLean, Virginia. It has grown rapidly over the years and is now one of the largest credit card issuers in the United States.

In addition to Freddie Mac and Capital One, there are many other financial institutions located in Virginia. Some of the other major players in the state's banking and finance industry include:

- Virginia National Bank: This Charlottesville-based bank provides commercial and personal banking services to individuals and businesses in Virginia.
- TowneBank: Based in Virginia Beach, TowneBank is a community bank that provides a range of financial services to individuals and businesses in Virginia and North Carolina.
- Genworth Financial: This Richmond-based company provides mortgage insurance, long-term care insurance, and other financial products to individuals and businesses.

Virginia's banking and finance industry is a major driver of the state's economy. With companies like Freddie Mac and Capital One located there, as well as a host of other financial institutions, Virginia is well-positioned to continue to be a leader in this important industry.

== Biggest companies ==
The following companies are the 20 largest Virginia-based companies in 2022.

Rank	Company	Industry	Revenue
1.	Amazon	E-commerce, Technology	$513.9 billion
2.	RTX	Arms, Aerospace	$67.0 billion
3.	Boeing	Aerospace, Arms	$66.6 billion
4.	PFG	Food	$57.3 billion
5.	Mars, Inc.	Food	$45.0 billion
6.	General Dynamics	Arms, Aerospace	$39.4 billion
7.	Capital One	Financial services	$38.4 billion
8.	Northrop Grumman	Arms, Aerospace	$36.6 billion
9.	Dollar Tree	Retail	$28.3 billion
10	Freddie Mac	Financial services	$21.3 billion
11.	Altria	Tobacco	$21.1 billion
12.	DXC Technology	Information technology	$16.3 billion
13.	Leidos	National security, Arms	$14.4 billion
14.	Smithfield	Food	$14.3 billion
15.	Lafarge	Building materials	$12.8 billion
16.	Huntington Ingalls	National security, Arms	$10.7 billion
17.	AES	Energy	$10.2 billion
18.	Booz Allen Hamilton	Management, Information technology	$9.3 billion
19.	Hilton	Hospitality	$8.8 billion
20.	Beacon	Building materials	$8.4 billion

== Taxation ==
Virginia collects personal income tax in five income brackets, ranging from 3.0% to 5.75%. The sales and use tax rate is 4%. The tax rate on food is 1.5%. There is an additional 1% local tax, for a total of a 5% combined sales tax on most Virginia purchases and a combined tax rate of 2.5% on food. Virginia's property tax is set and collected at the local government level and varies throughout the commonwealth. Real estate is taxed at the local level based on 100% of fair market value. Effective true tax rates on real estate vary and are set by locality. Tangible personal property also is taxed at the local level and is based on a percentage or percentages of original cost. Tangible personal property includes, but is not limited to, machinery and equipment, furniture, fixtures, and trucks and automobiles. The Virginia General Assembly exempted intangible personal property from taxation in 1984 by making the tax rate zero. Virginia does not collect inheritance taxes; however, its estate tax is decoupled from the federal estate tax laws, and therefore the Commonwealth imposes its own estate tax.

== See also ==
- Virginia locations by per capita income
