= Boats Group =

Miami based advertising and software company for the marine industry

Boats Group, LLC
- Type: Private
- Industry: Advertising and Software
- Founded: Virginia, United States (2011)
- Headquarters: Miami, Florida, United States
- Area served: Worldwide
- Key people: Patrick Kolek, CEO
- Products: Media
- Number of employees: 150+
- Parent: Permira
- Website: Boats Group

Boats Group is a Miami, Florida, United States, based advertising and software company for the marine industry with niche titles: YachtWorld, BoatTrader.com, boats.com, Annonces du Bateau, Boten te Koop, Cosas de Barcos, Boatshop24, Boats and Outboards, YachtCloser, Click and Boat and Trident Funding. In addition to Miami, Boats Group has operations in Fareham, Padova and Barcelona. Boats is owned by Permira.

== History ==
- Dominion Marine Media (DMM) was established in May 2011, following the bringing together of all Dominion Enterprises marine assets; Boat Trader with YachtWorld and boats.com.
- In 2014, DMM acquired Cosas de Barcos.
- In July 2016, Funds advised by Apax Partners announced that they had entered into a definitive agreement to acquire Dominion Marine Media ("DMM"), from Dominion Enterprises, a subsidiary of Landmark Media Enterprises.
- January 30, 2017, Dominion Marine Media acquires YachtCloser
- On February 17, 2017, Dominion Marine Media (DMM) rebranded to Boats Group, LLC.
- June 1, 2017, Boats Group moves headquarters to Miami.
- January 10, 2020, Boats Group buys Annonces du Bateau.
- October 6, 2020, Apax Partners Boats Group acquires Dutch boating marketplaces Botentekoop.nl, Boten.nl and Botenbank.nl from Arimpex Media Solutions.
- December 30, 2020, Boats Group sold by Apax Partners to Permira for an undisclosed price.
- January 25, 2021, Boats Group acquires European online boat marketplaces, Boatshop24 and Boats and Outboards, from media group.
- July 19, 2021, Boats Group makes an investment in Click and Boat.

== News ==
- "Brunswick Corporation : Brunswick Launches Free Online Marketing Program With Dominion Marine Media For Brunswick Certified Dealers. Reuters. Oct 22, 2013.
- "Boatbound Signs Partnership with Dominion Marine Media. Crowdfund Insider . May 3, 2014.
