= BoatTrader.com =

American marine classified advertising website

boattrader.com
- Available in: English
- Headquarters: Miami, Florida
- Owners: Boats Group (General Atlantic, CPP Investments, Permira)
- Website: www.boattrader.com
- Commercial: Yes
- Registration: Optional
- Launched: 1996
- Current status: Online

BoatTrader.com is a Miami, Florida-based website in the marine classified segment aimed at the US market launched in 1991.

== History ==
- Print magazines launched in 1991 by Boat Trader with offices in over 40 cities across the United States.
- A website was launched in 1996 under the domain BoatTraderOnline.com, part of the TraderOnline.com network, which in turn was part of Trader Publishing Co.
- September 2004, NADAguides.com Integrates BoatTraderOnline.com as Exclusive Boat Classifieds Partner.
- In December 2005, SailBoatTraderOnline.com is launched by BoatTraderOnline.com.
- In 2009, BoatTrader shifted its entire audience from print to online under BoatTrader.com, merging 3 of the trader marine websites of BoatTraderOnline.com, SailBoatTraderOnline.com and YachtTraderOnline.com.
- June 2009, Yamaha and BoatTrader.com launch advertising program.
- May 2011, BoatTrader.com is merged with YachtWorld.com and boats.com brands under the new company Dominion Marine Media.
- June 1, 2017, Boat Trader and Boats Group decides Miami is the place to be, anchors headquarters.
- April 2022, Boat Trader launches the award-winning TV show Stomping Grounds on streaming television featuring local boaters and celebrities across America.
- May 2023, Season 2 of Stomping Grounds premiered. The series received a Silver Telly Award in the online documentary series category.
- December 2025, Boats Group announced an investment from General Atlantic and CPP Investments; Permira partially realized its investment and retained a significant minority stake.
