= Boatsetter =

American online platform

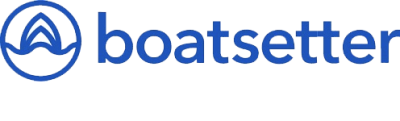
- Company type: Private
- Industry: Sharing economy
- Founded: 2015; 11 years ago
- Founders: Jaclyn Baumgarten; Andrew Sturner
- Headquarters: Fort Lauderdale, Florida, U.S.
- Key people: Michael Farb (CEO)
- Website: boatsetter.com

Boatsetter is an American online platform for boat rentals based in Fort Lauderdale, Florida.

The platform includes more than 50,000 boat listings and connects boat owners, renters, and captains across 700 locations in the Caribbean, Europe, Mexico, and the United States.

== History ==
Boatsetter was originally founded in 2014 by Andrew Sturner. In 2015, it merged with Cruzin, which was founded by Jaclyn Baumgarten, and adopted the name Boatsetter.

In August 2017, Boatsetter acquired Boatbound. Founded in 2013, Boatbound was based in Seattle, Washington. It was often described as Airbnb for boats.

In November 2017, Boatsetter relocated from Aventura to a 3,200-square-foot headquarters in downtown Fort Lauderdale. The move coincided with the Fort Lauderdale International Boat Show, where the company showcased its services to nearly 3,000 charter operators.

In August 2019, Boatsetter raised $10 million in Series A funding. Previously, it had raised $13 million in December 2016.

During the COVID-19 pandemic, Boatsetter saw a surge in demand for safe outdoor activities, which led to a 200 percent annual increase in bookings by July, driven largely by multi-day rentals and staycations.

In May 2021, Boatsetter acquired Fisher Guiding, a New York-based fishing charter marketplace. The acquisition expanded Boatsetter Fishing service to include fishing charters, guides, and outfitters.

In August 2022, Boatsetter raised $38 million in Series B funding.

In January 2023, Michael Farb became the chief executive officer (CEO) of the company, succeeding Jaclyn Baumgarten, who had served as CEO since 2014.

== Platform ==
Boatsetter is a peer-to-peer boat rental platform.

Before onboarding, Boatsetter pre-screens renters to ensure compliance with insurance, safety requirements, and boat-owner criteria. Qualified renters may book boats without a licensed captain. Owners typically offer half-day, full-day, or custom charters. The platform primarily features boats between 28 and 60 feet and serves renters regardless of boating experience. Renters may also book U.S. Coast Guard-licensed captains through the platform. Boat owners set rental prices, and Boatsetter takes a 20 percent commission. Through another service called Boatsetter Lux Charters, it provides luxury boats and yachts for rent.

Boatsetter has been described as Airbnb for boats. The platform can be accessed through a mobile app.

== See also ==
- Click and Boat
- Sailo
