= Boats.com =

American online advertising website

boats.com
- Headquarters: Miami, Florida
- Owner: Permira
- Website: www.boats.com
- Commercial: Yes
- Registration: Optional
- Launched: 1999
- Current status: Online

boats.com is an online advertising website based in Miami, Florida, United States. It also has operations in Fareham and Padua. The company has websites in nine markets and eight languages, listing over 350,000 boats in approximately 152 countries.

== History ==
- boats.com, Inc was founded by Paul R. Rabe and Stu Johnstone, in 1999, a private, venture capital funded business located at Pier 38, The Embarcadero, in San Francisco. In August, a venture capital funding round generated a $21 million second-round investment.
- January 2000, boats.com, Inc. agreed from the Cobalt Group (NASDAQ: CBLT) to acquire YachtWorld.com, a popular online yachting marketplace, the first Internet content deal within the boating industry.
- May 2004, British Marine Federation (BMF) support for boats.com European Marine Industry Web Awards
- In September 2004, Boats.com, Inc was purchased by Trader Publishing Company, a joint business venture of Landmark Media Enterprises and Cox Enterprises.
- In September 2006, Landmark Media Enterprises and Cox Enterprises split the assets of Trader Publishing and YachtWorld became part of Dominion Marine Media, a subsidiary of Dominion Enterprises, LLC which was in turn a subsidiary of Landmark Media Enterprises.
- In January 2013, the Royal Yachting Association launched the RYA Classifieds service which is powered by boats.com.
- February 17, 2017, parent of boats.com, Dominion Marine Media (DMM), which was acquired by Apax Partners in 2016, was rebranded to Boats Group, LLC.
- February 17, 2017, Sam Fulton is CEO at Boats Group, which includes the leading marine brands of YachtWorld, Boat Trader, boats.com, Cosas de Barcos and YachtCloser.
- June 1, 2017, boats.com and Boats Group moved headquarters to Miami.
- April 2023, Patrick Kolek is CEO at Boats Group.
