= Dominion Tower (disambiguation) =

Dominion Tower is a building in Norfolk, Virginia, USA. Dominion Tower may also refer to several buildings, either currently or former named Dominion Tower:

Formerly named Dominion Tower:

- Benson Tower (New Orleans)
- EQT Plaza in Pittsburgh, Pennsylvania

== See also ==
- Toronto-Dominion Bank Tower, Toronto, Ontario
