= List of tallest buildings in Norfolk =

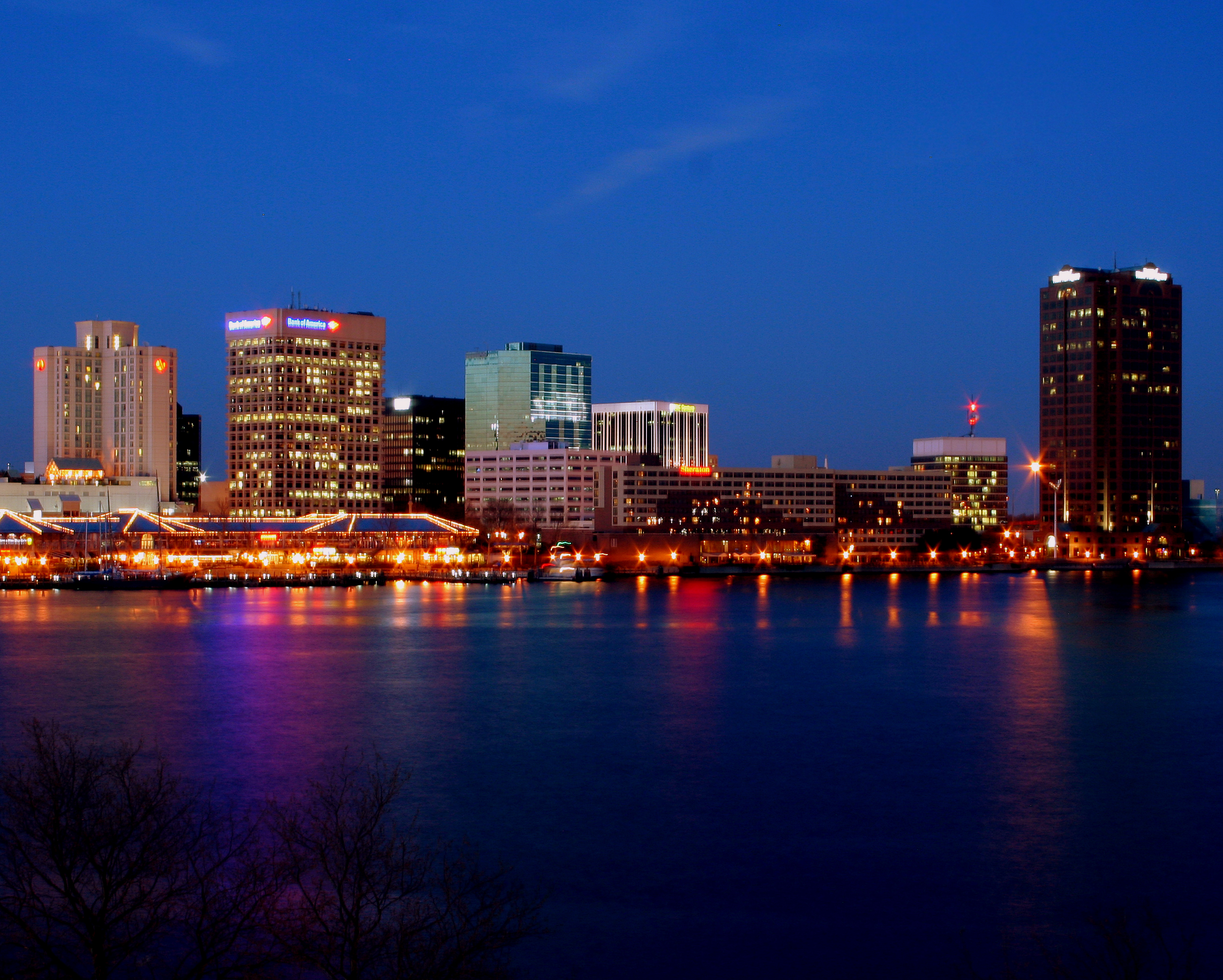
Norfolk skyline

The history of high-rises in Norfolk, Virginia, began in the early 1900s with the construction of such structures as the 12-story Royster Building in 1912.

The skyline of Downtown Norfolk remained relatively low to mid-rise until the 1960s which brought the construction of the 23-story Bank of America Center in 1967. Still the second-tallest building in Norfolk, the Bank of America Center was the tallest building in Virginia from its completion until 1971 when it was surpassed by Richmond City Hall.

Dominion Tower took the top spot from Bank of America Center when it was completed in 1987 with 26 stories along the newly revitalized Elizabeth River waterfront adjacent to the Berkley Bridge. Dominion Tower also stood as the tallest building in the Hampton Roads metro area until 2002, when the Armada Hoffler Tower was completed in adjacent Virginia Beach.

The majority of the most prominent and recognizable buildings in the downtown skyline were built between the late 1980s and the present, concluding with the opening of the 23-story Wells Fargo Center in 2010. While two additional towers had been proposed for downtown in the late 2000s, both have been stalled by the faltering world economy. These two structures, the Granby Tower condominium building and the Westin Hotel and Convention Center would have ranked high on this list, with the Granby Tower taking the top spot with 31 stories at 137 meters (449 feet). The Westin was proposed to have 26 stories and be just short of the Dominion Tower's height. Construction began on the newest tower, The Main, which includes a 23-story Hilton hotel and conference center in May 2014. This replaces the planned Westin at the corner of Main and Granby streets.

== Ranking ==
This lists ranks the tallest skyscrapers over 200 feet tall in Norfolk, Virginia, based on standard height measurement. This includes spires and architectural details but does not include antenna masts. The "Year" column indicates the year in which a building was completed.

| Rank | Name | Image | Height ft (m) | Floors | Year | Primary Purpose |
|---|---|---|---|---|---|---|
| 1 | Dominion Tower | | 341 ft (104 m) | 26 | 1987 | Office |
| 2 | Icon Norfolk (formerly Bank of America Center) | | 305 (93) | 23 | 1967 | Built as Virginia National Bank Tower in 1967; converted to Residential in 2017 |
| 3 | Wells Fargo Center | | 298 (91) | 23 | 2010 | Office |
| 4 | 150 West Main Street | | 292 (89) | 20 | 2002 | Office |
| 5 | Norfolk Waterside Marriott | | 285 (87) | 23 | 1991 | Hotel |
| 6 | TowneBank Tower (formerly Norfolk Southern Tower) | | 282 (86) | 20 | 1989 | Office |
| 7 | Hilton Norfolk the Main | | 270 (82) | 23 | 2017 | Hotel |
| 8 | Dominion Enterprises Building | | 267 (81) | 20 | 2006 | Office |
| 9 | River Tower | | 265 (81) | 24 | 2021 | Residential |
| 10 | CHKD In-Patient Tower | | 225 (69) | 14 | 2022 | Hospital |
| 11 | 500 East Main Street | | 223 (68) | 17 | 1971 | Office |
| 12 | 555 East Main Street | | 220 (67) | 17 | 1977 | Office |
| 13 | Harbor's Edge | | 213 (65) | 17 | 2006 | Residential |
| 14 | Hague Towers | | 203 (62) | 20 | 1970 | Residential |

== Skyscrapers under construction or proposed ==
| Rank | Name | Picture | Height ft (m) | Floors | Year | Status | Description |
|---|---|---|---|---|---|---|---|
| 1 | Norfolk Gateway Tower | | 300 (91) | 22 | 2020 | Proposed | The new office tower will rise to frame the entrance into downtown Norfolk |

== Canceled Skyscrapers ==
- Granby Tower (2010)
- Westin Hotel and Conference Center (2011); while this project was canceled, it was later revived as the Hilton Norfolk at the Main (2017).

== See also ==
- List of tallest buildings in Virginia
- List of tallest buildings in Richmond
- List of tallest buildings in Tysons, Virginia
- List of tallest buildings in Virginia Beach
