= Stomping Grounds (TV series) =

- Genre: Travel television series
- Created by: Boat Trader; C. Ryan McVinney
- Starring: C. Ryan McVinney
- Music by: Various
- Country of origin: United States
- Original language: English
- No. of seasons: 1
- No. of episodes: 9

Stomping Grounds is an American travel and boating show produced by Boat Trader and hosted by Ryan McVinney that originally premiered on YouTube on March 5, 2021, followed by the official television release of the first season on various streaming platforms on Apr 4, 2022.

In the show, McVinney travels across America uncovering local boating traditions and on-the-water culture, meeting up with local boaters who share why they love their boats along with tales of cherished pastimes and legendary lore from their local waters. The series embarks on boating adventures across a diverse range of waterways to capture the essence of America's varied rivers, lakes, bays and oceans. Each episode explores different types of boats and unique watercraft used for various activities, from fishing to water sports, and delves into key features that make certain vessels ideal for their intended purposes.

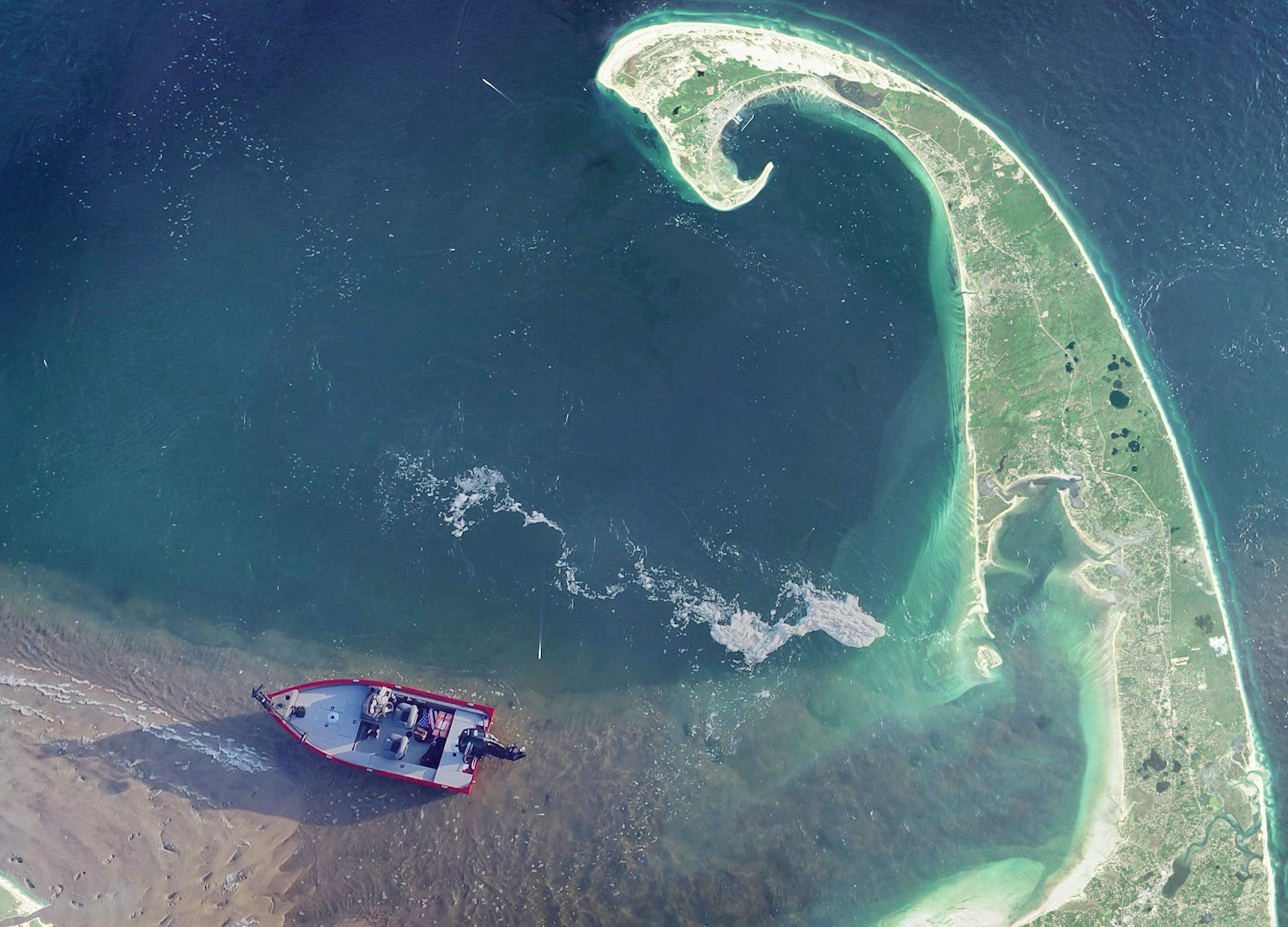
A Tracker boat on the water in Cape Cod for Stomping Grounds episode one.

== Pilot Season ==
The first three episodes travel to Cape Cod, Massachusetts, Florida's Panhandle region and Wilmington, North Carolina visiting with a host of celebrated boaters, including Brian Kelley of Florida Georgia Line, Netflix's Outer Banks creator Jonas Pate, legendary champion powerboat racer Reggie Fountain and many more.

== Season 1 ==
Season 1 features more episodes that dive further into American boating traditions as McVinney and his crew visit towns across the country from the Northeast to the Southwest, and the Pacific Northwest up to the state of Alaska. Episode 6 features sailfishing in Stuart Florida, and the storied past of the historic Treasure Coast while Episode 7 highlights Ernest Hemingway's historic yacht Pilar and the Wheeler family from Maine who built it for the famous author back in 1934.

== Season 2 ==
Season 2 of Stomping Grounds premiered on May 19, 2023 and continued the exploration of unique boating cultures in different regions across the United States. Episode One of Season Two visited waterways around Jacksonville, Florida, and featured NFL Jaguars Player Logan Cooke as well as the U.S. Navy Blue Angels flight squadron. Other destinations in Season Two include Chicago, IL; Nashville, TN; Portland, OR; San Francisco, CA; Austin, TX; and New Orleans, LA.

== Awards ==
The show was awarded a 2022 Viddy Award for outstanding video creative in the Culture and Lifestyle category for Long Form Videos and received a Neptune Award from the Marine Marketers of America for outstanding video series.

The 44th Annual Telly Awards named the show a Silver Winner in the online documentary series category on May 23, 2023.

The series was again named a winner in 2024 by the 45th Annual Telly Awards, receiving significant acclaim from both judges and broader viewers, earning both a Silver Award for Long-Form Documentary and a Bronze People's Telly for Best Online Series & Shows. The two awards specifically recognized the episode Alaska's Massive Marvels, that featured a 46-foot sport fishing yacht built by Lindell Yachts, showcasing its rough water capabilities on a challenging fishing excursion for giant halibut in the Gulf of Alaska through big waves and foul weather to the remote Montague Island (Alaska), one of North America's largest uninhabited islands.

== Distribution ==
The show is distributed by Waypoint TV and is available on SLING, Tubi, Hulu, Samsung TV Plus (Channel 1184), Vizio (Channel 258), Pluto TV (Channel 2205) and Plex (Channel 258).

Select episodes are available on YouTube.

The series airs on TV to UK viewers on the Speedvision Network who also distributes the show to millions of viewers on Google TV.

It can also be found on Apple TV, Roku, Amazon Fire TV, Samsung TV, LG TV, YouTube, iOS, Android.
