= Norfolk Waterside Marriott =

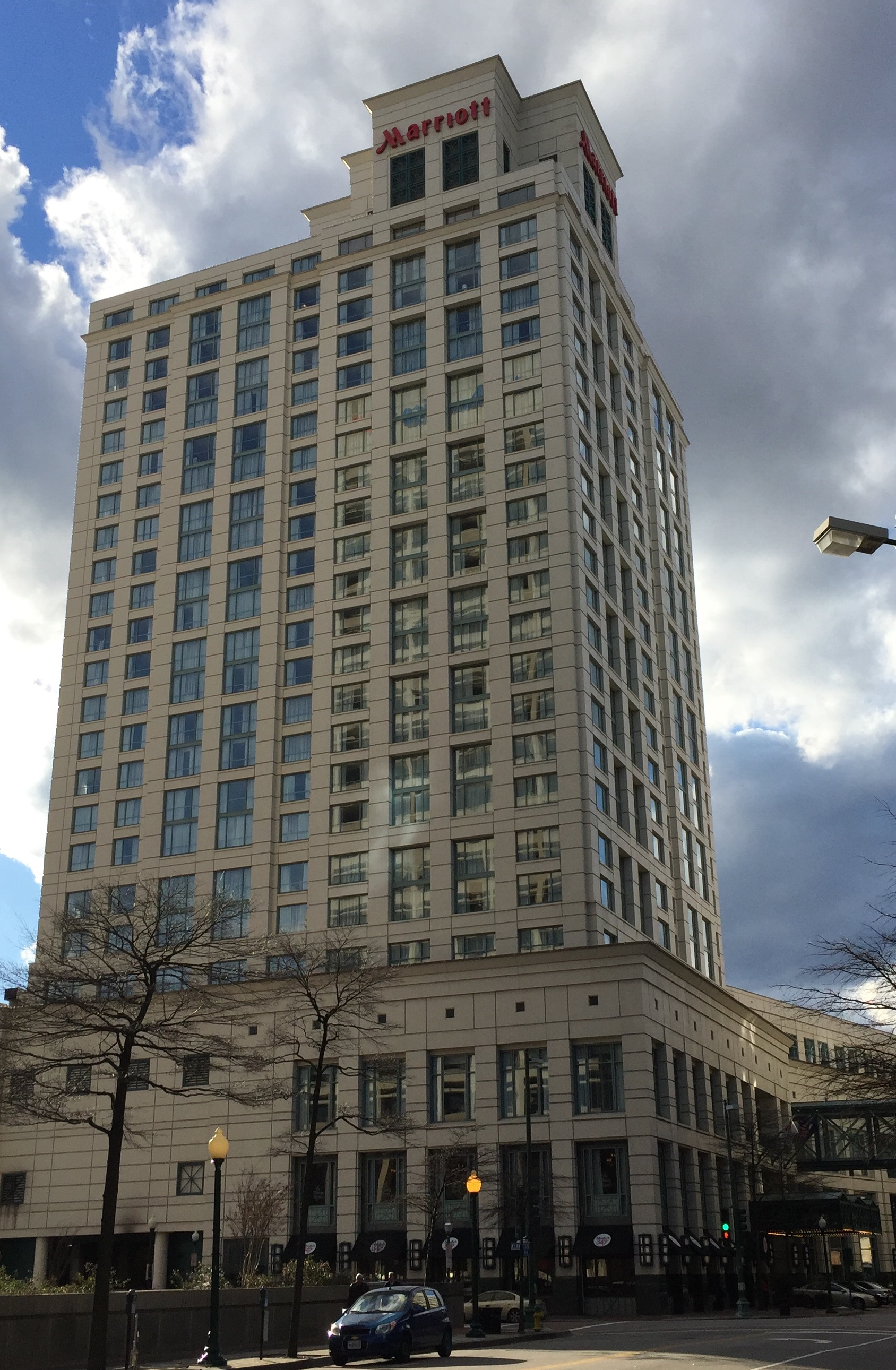
- View of the tower from across the Elizabeth River
- Interactive map of the Norfolk Waterside Marriott area

General information
- Status: Completed
- Type: Hotel
- Location: 235 East Main Street; Norfolk, Virginia 23510
- Coordinates: 36°50′44″N 76°17′25.8″W
- Completed: 1991

Height
- Roof: 285 ft (87 m)

Technical details
- Floor count: 23

Norfolk Waterside Marriott is one of the major distinctive and recognizable features of Downtown Norfolk, Virginia, United States. The tower houses a 397-room Marriott Hotel.

== See also ==
- List of tallest buildings in Norfolk, Virginia
- History of Norfolk, Virginia
- History of Hampton Road, Virginia
