= Landmark Media Enterprises =

American media company

Landmark Media Enterprises, LLC

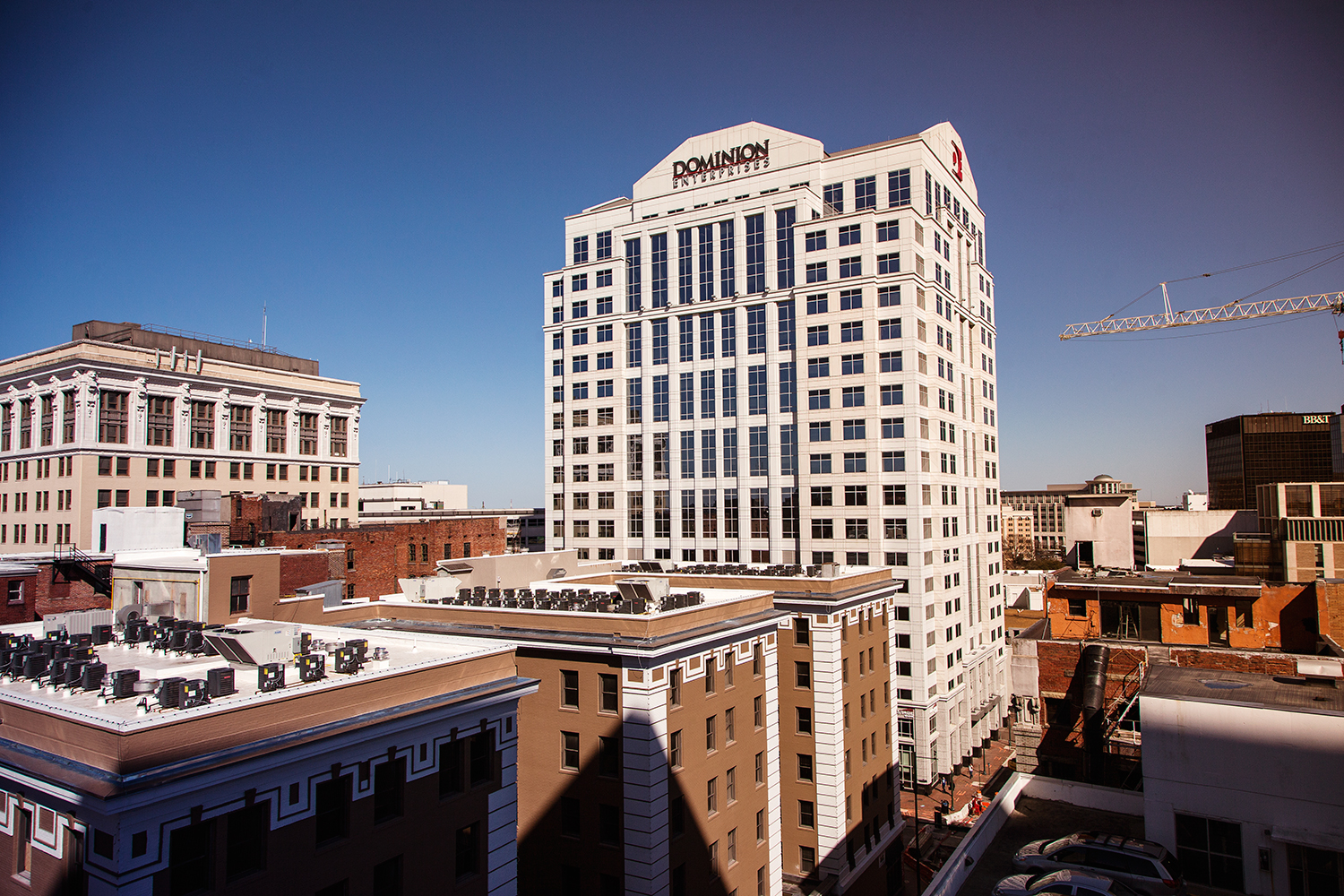
- Landmark Media Enterprises is headquartered in the Dominion Enterprises Building in downtown Norfolk, Virginia
- Type: Private
- Genre: Technology
- Founded: 1873; 153 years ago
- Headquarters: 150 Granby Street; Norfolk, Virginia 23510-2075
- Key people: Charles Watkins (president and CEO)
- Subsidiaries: Dominion Enterprises

Landmark Media Enterprises, LLC (a spinoff of Landmark Communications, Inc.) is a privately held technology company headquartered in Norfolk, Virginia.

== History ==
The Norfolk Landmark was established in 1873. It had various editors. K. C. Murray was one of them. He testified in suit against another paper for slander. Lucien D. Starke, a former state legislator, was one of its presidents.

Norfolk Newspapers was founded in 1905 as a holding company for the newspaper properties of Samuel L. Slover, including the Norfolk Landmark. They included papers which would eventually become today's Virginian-Pilot.

Frank Batten, Slover's nephew, took over the company in 1955, and changed its name to Norfolk-Portsmouth Newspapers Inc. in 1957 (reflecting the merger of the Norfolk Ledger-Dispatch and Portsmouth Star), then to Landmark Communications in 1967. Landmark Media Enterprises was spun off from Landmark Communications in 2008. Landmark is controlled by the Batten family.

== Properties ==
Landmark owns Dominion Enterprises, which provides software as a service and information products to auto dealers, motorcycle dealers, real estate agents, hotels and franchisors. The businesses owned by Dominion Enterprises include DominionDMS, Activator, Dealer Specialties, Cross-Sell, DataOne Software, Prime Street, Franchise Ventures, DX1, ZiiDMS, and Travel Media Group.

== Former properties ==
One of Landmark Communications's holdings was TeleCable Corporation, a cable television service that began in a small Virginia town in the late 1950s. Landmark obtained franchise licenses to operate in about two dozen cities throughout the eastern half of the U.S., including Overland Park, Kansas; Plano & Arlington, Texas; Bloomington, Illinois; Racine, Wisconsin; Springfield, Missouri; Wytheville & Princeton, West Virginia; Selma, Alabama, and other cities. TeleCable was a progressive company that inspired HBO 2, Disney 2, and Showtime 2 in Overland Park, Kansas. Prior to the 1980s, technology enabled subscribers to receive only 12 channels on a CATV system. TeleCable built two CATV systems in one when the franchise was granted in Overland Park in the late 1960s. Customers had A/B switches at their TVs so they could select either set of channels. This gave TeleCable of Overland Park twice as many channels (24) as other CATV companies. With advances in technology, TeleCable of Overland Park was able to double the number offered to 48 channels. In the early 1980s, there were very few satellite channels, and the pay cable channels typically signed off the air before midnight on weeknights (later on the weekends). Customers complained to TeleCable of Overland Park that they missed the 7 p.m. movie start due to late working hours, dinner, or children's activities. TeleCable management contacted HBO, Showtime, and The Disney Channel to ask to receive the Eastern Time Zone satellite feed of their programs for its Central Time Zone operation. TeleCable officials planned to charge customers who requested this expanded service an extra 50 cents per month. The movie channels dismissed the idea, believing no one would pay for that option. After several months, management had the full attention of the networks, as thousands were signing up. The sole benefit for customers was a one-hour earlier start for movies and other programs. But HBO and Showtime soon decided to create separate services for those channels. Disney followed suit a few years later.

Landmark's predecessor, Norfolk Newspapers, entered broadcasting in 1930, when it bought Virginia's oldest radio station, WTAR. It later added Virginia's second television station (and Hampton Roads' first), WTAR-TV (now WTKR) and an FM station (now WVKL). It acquired WFMY-TV in Greensboro as part of its purchase of the Greensboro, North Carolina newspapers in 1965. However, U.S. Federal Communications Commission (FCC) cross-ownership rules forced Landmark to sell off WFMY in 1976 and WTAR-TV in 1981. Under the rules then, a company could not own both a newspaper and a television station in the same market.

Landmark was an owner of KNTV in San Jose, California from 1978 to 1990. During its 12-year ownership of the station, KNTV (then affiliated with ABC and serving the Monterey / Salinas media market) was its only station that was not an affiliate of the CBS network. Landmark briefly owned WDBJ-TV in Roanoke, Virginia, but was forced to sell it immediately due to FCC restrictions. Landmark owned The Travel Channel from 1992 to 1996, when it was sold to Paxson Communications.

The company owned Chicago magazine from 1990 to 1995, when it was sold to Primedia. At one time, Landmark owned a minority share of the Washingtonian magazine, until its rights were traded to Eleanor Merrill, widow of its publisher Philip Merrill, in exchange for full ownership of the Annapolis Capital and five other Maryland newspapers.

Landmark owned the hobby publisher Antique Trader Publications until its sale to Krause Publications in 1999. In December 2001, Landmark announced it would close its subsidiary Church Impressions, based in Greenville, North Carolina, which published church directories, portraits, and other print and web media products.

Landmark once owned four career training schools that focus on health-related career education: Glendale Career College, Certified Careers Institute, Nevada Career Institute and Virginia Career Institute.

On September 19, 2007, it was announced that Continental Broadband (CB), a Landmark Communications (Landmark Media Enterprises) company, sold its South Florida business unit, WebUnited, to Host.net, the leading provider of data center (colocation) and managed network services in Florida. On May 15, 2009, CB sold its Chicago business unit, ANET, to Cogent Communications, a global Internet service provider. On January 23, 2010, CB divested its Richmond Business Unit, NET Telcos, to Cavalier Telephone, a full-service provider of telecommunications solutions.

In early 2008, the Landmark confirmed that it was exploring the sale of the entire company. Two separate investment banks, JPMorgan Chase and Lehman Brothers, were hired to help with the sale of The Weather Channel and the newspapers.

Landmark's best-known media outlet was the Weather Channel, based in Atlanta, Georgia. As part of its divestiture, the company announced in July 2008 the $3.5 billion sale of its Weather Channel properties, which included its share of The Weather Network and weather.com, plus Weather Services International and MétéoMédia, to a consortium comprising NBCUniversal and the private equity firms Blackstone Group and Bain Capital. Landmark and NBC Universal completed the sale on September 12, 2008.

On July 14 of that year, it was announced that WTVF in Nashville, Tennessee would be sold to Bonten Media Group, but that sale did not close. Landmark eventually sold the station to Journal Communications in 2012.

In October 2008, the company suspended further sales of its properties, citing the ongoing credit crisis, with the exception of The Virginian-Pilot newspaper.

On January 31, 2013, Landmark sold the News & Record newspaper in Greensboro, North Carolina to Berkshire Hathaway. In May 2013, Landmark sold the Roanoke Times, the metropolitan newspaper serving Roanoke, Virginia, also to Berkshire Hathaway.

Landmark sold its Maryland newspapers to The Baltimore Sun Media Group on May 1, 2014.

CBS affiliate KLAS-TV, based in Las Vegas, Nevada, was acquired by Landmark in 1978 from a trust left by Howard Hughes upon his death. On November 21, 2014, Nexstar Broadcasting Group announced that it planned to purchase KLAS for $145 million. The sale closed on February 13, 2015.

In July 2016, Dominion Enterprises sold Dominion Marine Media (BoatTrader.com, YachtWorld.com, Boats.com) to funds advised by Apax Partners. The company is now Boats Group.

In May 2017, Dominion Enterprises sold Dominion Web Solutions (CycleTrader.com, RVTrader.com, CommercialTruckTrader.com, EquipmentTrader.com) to Eurazeo and West Street Capital Partners VII, a fund managed by the Goldman Sachs Merchant Banking Division, for $680 million. The company is now called Trader Interactive.

On Sept. 12, 2017, CoStar Group agreed to purchase the ForRent apartment advertising division of Dominion Enterprises in exchange for $350 million in cash and $35 million in CoStar Group stock.

In May 2018, Landmark sold The Virginian-Pilot and its associated publications and websites to Tribune Publishing for $34 million.

In October 2019, Landmark sold Expedient Data Centers to AMP Capital for $500 million.

In November 2020, Landmark sold its remaining Colorado newspapers (Brighton Standard Blade, Fort Lupton Press, Commerce City Sentinel Express, Metro Advertiser, Canyon Courier, Clear Creek Courant and 285 Hustler) to Colorado Community Media.

In April 2021, Landmark announced the sale of Homes.com, a unit of its Dominion Enterprises subsidiary, to CoStar Group Inc. for $156 million.

Landmark formerly owned more than 50 community newspapers and special-interest publications in 11 states. That includes seven publications that cover college sports at Florida State University, University of Florida, Indiana University, University of Iowa (Voice of The Hawkeyes), University of Nebraska–Lincoln, University of Kentucky and University of North Carolina at Chapel Hill; and two daily newspapers: Citrus County Chronicle of Crystal River, Florida and The News-Enterprise of Elizabethtown, Kentucky.

Landmark Community Newspapers properties
Name	U.S. state	Type
Anderson News	Kentucky	Newspaper
Brunswick Beacon	North Carolina	Newspaper
Carolina Blue	North Carolina	Sports Publication
Carolina Gateway	South Carolina	Newspaper
Carrollton News-Democrat	Kentucky	Newspaper
Casey County News	Kentucky	Newspaper
Cedar Key Beacon	Florida	Newspaper
Central Kentucky Homes	Kentucky	Real Estate Magazine
Central Kentucky News-Journal	Kentucky	Newspaper
Chester News And Reporter	South Carolina	Newspaper
Chiefland Citizen	Florida	Newspaper
Citrus County Chronicle	Florida	Newspaper
Cynthiana Democrat	Kentucky	Newspaper
Declaration	Virginia	Newspaper
Gadsden County Times	Florida	Newspaper
Gator Bait	Florida	Sports Publication
Grant County News and Express	Kentucky	Newspaper
Henry County Local	Kentucky	Newspaper
Huskers Illustrated	Nebraska	Sports Publication
Inside Indiana	Indiana	Sports Publication
Lafollette Press	Tennessee	Newspaper
Las Vegas Optic	New Mexico	Newspaper
Lebanon Enterprise	Kentucky	Newspaper
Los Alamos Monitor	New Mexico	Newspaper
Morgan County News	Tennessee	Newspaper
Mt. Vernon Democrat	Indiana	Newspaper
Oldham Era	Kentucky	Newspaper
Opinion-Tribune	Iowa	Newspaper
Owenton News-Herald	Kentucky	Newspaper
Pageland Progressive-Journal	South Carolina	Newspaper
Perry County News	Indiana	Newspaper
Pioneer News	Kentucky	Newspaper
PLG-TV	Kentucky	Television station
Red Oak Express	Iowa	Newspaper
Riverland News	Florida	Newspaper
Roane County News	Tennessee	Newspaper
Sentinel-News	Kentucky	Newspaper
South Marion Citizen	Florida	Newspaper
Spencer County Journal-Democrat	Indiana	Newspaper
Spencer Magnet	Kentucky	Newspaper
Springfield Sun	Kentucky	Newspaper
Standard Publishing Company	Kentucky	Newspaper
Sumter County Times	Florida	Newspaper
The Bedford Bulletin	Virginia	Newspaper
The Cats' Pause	Kentucky	Sports Publication
The Gazette	Virginia	Newspaper
The Kentucky Standard	Kentucky	Newspaper
The Lancaster News	South Carolina	Newspaper
The Larue County Herald-News	Kentucky	Newspaper
The News-Enterprise	Kentucky	Newspaper
The Osceola	Florida	Sports Publication
The Record	Kentucky	Newspaper
The Wakulla News	Florida	Newspaper
Trimble Banner	Kentucky	Newspaper
Vandalia Leader-Union	Illinois	Newspaper
West Marion Messenger	Florida	Newspaper
Williston Pioneer Sun News	Florida	Newspaper

In May 2021, Landmark Community Newspapers was sold to Paxton Media Group.

== Television stations ==
Stations are alphabetically by state and city of license.

- (**) - indicates a station that was built and signed-on by Landmark.

City of license / market	Station	Channel	Years owned	Current ownership status
San Jose–San Francisco–Oakland, CA	KNTV	11	1978–1990	NBC owned-and-operated (O&O)
Las Vegas, NV	KLAS-TV	8	1978–2014	CBS affiliate owned by Nexstar Media Group
Greensboro–Winston-Salem–High Point, NC	WFMY-TV	2	1965–1976	CBS affiliate owned by Tegna Inc.
Nashville, TN	WTVF	5	1994–2012	CBS affiliate owned by E. W. Scripps Company
Norfolk–Hampton, VA	WTAR-TV **	3	1950–1981	CBS affiliate WTKR, owned by E. W. Scripps Company
Roanoke–Lynchburg, VA	WDBJ-TV	7	1969	CBS affiliate owned by Gray Media
