= Voice of The Hawkeyes =

Voice of The Hawkeyes was an American sports-oriented magazine. It was owned and operated by Landmark Media Enterprises, and was affiliated with the 247Sports.com network. It covered University of Iowa athletics and was founded in 1987. It was issued 25 times per year. During the football season (September–December), the magazine was issued weekly; it was issued bi-weekly during the winter months, and monthly from April through August.
