= TowneBank Tower =

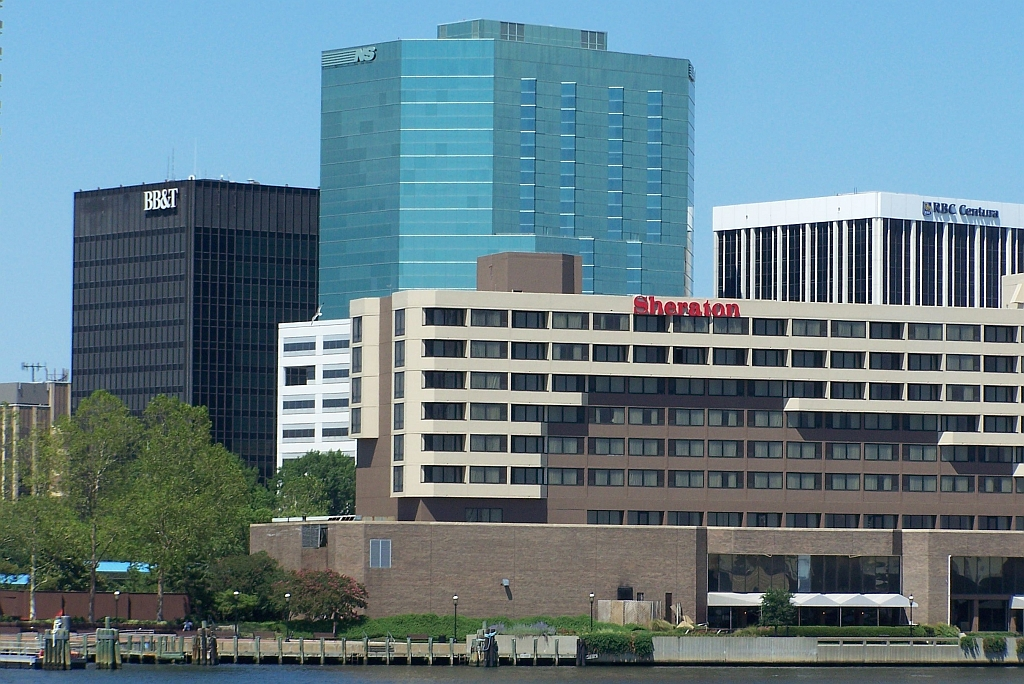
- View of the Norfolk Southern Tower (center with bluish-green glass) from the Elizabeth River
- Interactive map of the TowneBank Tower area

General information
- Status: Completed
- Type: Office
- Location: 3 Commercial Place; Norfolk, Virginia 23510
- Coordinates: 36.8456°N 76.2881°W
- Opening: 1989

Height
- Roof: 282 ft (86 m)

Technical details
- Floor count: 22

The TowneBank Tower (formerly the Norfolk Southern Tower) is one of the major distinctive and recognizable features of Downtown Norfolk, Virginia, United States. The building was notable as being the corporate headquarters of one of the United States' five Class I railroads, Norfolk Southern, until the relocation of their headquarters to Atlanta, GA in 2021. The tower was completed in 1989 at the corner of Main Street and Commercial Place in the business district of Downtown Norfolk.

The current tenancy of the building is split between the financial services wing of TowneBank and information offices of CHKD.

== Norfolk Southern Museum ==
From the time of their tenancy, the first floor of the tower featured the free Norfolk Southern Museum detailing the history of Norfolk Southern, which was created from numerous mergers over the last two centuries. Displays included photos, brochures, sections of Civil War-era track, vintage hand tools, a locomotive simulator, luggage tags, and diagrams to teach hand signals to railroad trainees and a 900-pound railroad coupler.

== See also ==
List of tallest buildings in Norfolk, Virginia
