= YachtWorld =

Online boat sales platform with Multiple listing system

- Type: Private
- Industry: Advertising
- Founded: 1995, Seattle
- Headquarters: Miami, Florida, United States
- Area served: Worldwide
- Key people: Patrick Kolek, CEO
- Products: Media
- Parent: Permira
- Website: yachtworld.com

YachtWorld is a company based in Miami that operates a boat sales platform with a multiple listing service, enabling professional yacht brokers, dealers and manufacturers to sell yachts. Jessica Muffett first founded YachtWorld in March 1995, semi-retiring as Publisher Emeritus in 2006. YachtWorld is now a subsidiary of Permira.

== History ==
YachtWorld.com was established in March 1995. In 2000, it became part of boats.com, Inc. and in September 2004, Boats.com, Inc was purchased by Trader Publishing Company, a joint business venture of Landmark Media Enterprises and Cox Enterprises. In September 2006, Landmark Media Enterprises and Cox Enterprises split the assets of Trader Publishing and YachtWorld became part of Dominion Marine Media, a subsidiary of Dominion Enterprises, LLC which was, in turn, a subsidiary of Landmark Media Enterprises. In 2012, YachtWorld launched an iPad application. and in 2015 relaunched its websites to be full responsive. On August 1, 2016, Apax Partners acquires Dominion Marine Media and on February 17, 2017, Dominion Marine Media (DMM) is rebranded to Boats Group, LLC. June 1, 2017, Boats Group including YachtWorld decides Miami is the place to be, anchors headquarters. December 30, 2020, YachtWorld with Boats Group sold by Apax Partners to Permira for an undisclosed price. Today, Pat Kolek is CEO at Boats Group which includes the leading marine brands of YachtWorld, Boat Trader, boats.com, Cosas de Barcos and YachtCloser.

== YachtWorld Market Index ==
Boats Group, a subsidiarity of Permira publishes YachtWorld Market Index. A report that provides global sales information to the marine industry. The index is released every quarter

== News ==
"Brexit creating buying opportunity for British yachts: YachtWorld. CNBC. July 10, 2016.
