= List of Virginia locations by per capita income =

As of 2000 Virginia had the sixth highest per capita income of any state in the United States of America, at $23,975 and in 2003 a personal per capita income of $33,671. Per capita income had increased to $41,255 by 2020.

== Most recent per capita income and household income ==
Virginia economic demographics by county as of 31 December 2020
State	County	Per capita income	Median house– hold income	Total income	Population	Number of house– holds
United States		$35,384	$98,357	$120,344,871 million	340,110,988	122,354,219
Virginia		$41,255	$111,832	$3,560,881 million	8,631,393	3,184,121
	Accomack County	$27,012	$66,164	$9,025 million	33,413	13,641
	Albemarle County	$46,241	$122,631	$51,972 million	112,395	42,381
	Alleghany County	$28,048	$65,396	$4,269 million	15,223	6,529
	Amelia County	$32,799	$86,428	$4,350 million	13,265	5,034
	Amherst County	$28,866	$74,311	$9,037 million	31,307	12,161
	Appomattox County	$27,889	$73,001	$4,495 million	16,119	6,158
	Arlington County	$73,078	$160,579	$174,395 million	238,643	108,604
	Augusta County	$30,493	$78,329	$23,628 million	77,487	30,165
	Bath County	$34,463	$79,221	$1,450 million	4,209	1,831
	Bedford County	$34,565	$87,404	$27,466 million	79,462	31,424
	Bland County	$23,664	$63,789	$1,483 million	6,270	2,326
	Botetourt County	$37,357	$95,288	$12,550 million	33,596	13,171
	Brunswick County	$24,493	$63,243	$3,881 million	15,849	6,138
	Buchanan County	$22,092	$54,375	$4,496 million	20,355	8,270
	Buckingham County	$23,045	$65,183	$3,877 million	16,824	5,948
	Campbell County	$28,173	$67,760	$15,691 million	55,696	23,157
	Caroline County	$35,588	$100,128	$10,992 million	30,887	10,978
	Carroll County	$24,476	$58,809	$7,135 million	29,155	12,134
	Charles City County	$36,325	$82,949	$2,460 million	6,773	2,966
	Charlotte County	$24,337	$58,019	$2,805 million	11,529	4,836
	Chesterfield County	$42,734	$122,444	$155,785 million	364,548	127,230
	Clarke County	$42,327	$109,968	$6,257 million	14,783	5,690
	Craig County	$30,433	$67,092	$1,488 million	4,892	2,219
	Culpeper County	$37,507	$112,800	$19,710 million	52,552	17,474
	Cumberland County	$29,160	$68,609	$2,821 million	9,675	4,112
	Dickenson County	$25,485	$62,851	$3,599 million	14,124	5,727
	Dinwiddie County	$30,351	$81,536	$8,482 million	27,947	10,403
	Essex County	$26,114	$60,817	$2,767 million	10,599	4,551
	Fairfax County	$58,338	$168,333	$671,067 million	1,150,309	398,653
	Fauquier County	$47,642	$141,224	$34,765 million	72,972	24,617
	Floyd County	$27,306	$63,480	$4,225 million	15,476	6,657
	Fluvanna County	$44,149	$120,699	$12,030 million	27,249	9,967
	Franklin County	$32,084	$76,895	$17,478 million	54,477	22,730
	Frederick County	$38,442	$109,501	$35,143 million	91,419	32,094
	Giles County	$27,679	$69,195	$4,646 million	16,787	6,715
	Gloucester County	$34,565	$90,457	$13,380 million	38,711	14,792
	Goochland County	$52,605	$149,324	$13,007 million	24,727	8,711
	Grayson County	$24,770	$59,454	$3,797 million	15,333	6,388
	Greene County	$33,913	$93,042	$6,969 million	20,552	7,491
	Greensville County	$20,011	$66,243	$2,279 million	11,391	3,441
	Halifax County	$24,368	$58,569	$8,290 million	34,022	14,155
	Hanover County	$43,003	$120,568	$47,294 million	109,979	39,226
	Henrico County	$41,437	$106,230	$138,560 million	334,389	130,434
	Henry County	$23,051	$55,891	$11,744 million	50,948	21,012
	Highland County	$30,911	$69,902	$689 million	2,232	987
	Isle of Wight County	$39,024	$103,111	$15,065 million	38,606	14,611
	James City County	$45,862	$120,915	$35,888 million	78,254	29,681
	King and Queen County	$34,873	$81,832	$2,304 million	6,608	2,816
	King George County	$38,926	$110,814	$10,402 million	26,723	9,387
	King William County	$33,261	$92,660	$5,923 million	17,810	6,393
	Lancaster County	$48,280	$99,710	$5,271 million	10,919	5,287
	Lee County	$19,126	$47,956	$4,240 million	22,173	8,843
	Loudoun County	$57,513	$182,632	$242,106 million	420,959	132,565
	Louisa County	$35,894	$93,824	$13,494 million	37,596	14,383
	Lunenburg County	$21,602	$57,656	$2,578 million	11,936	4,472
	Madison County	$34,434	$93,460	$4,764 million	13,837	5,098
	Mathews County	$43,918	$96,560	$3,747 million	8,533	3,881
	Mecklenburg County	$28,048	$68,740	$8,503 million	30,319	12,371
	Middlesex County	$33,992	$75,811	$3,611 million	10,625	4,764
	Montgomery County	$30,581	$86,175	$30,495 million	99,721	35,388
	Nelson County	$38,364	$88,594	$5,668 million	14,775	6,398
	New Kent County	$40,293	$113,899	$9,245 million	22,945	8,117
	Northampton County	$31,959	$76,202	$3,925 million	12,282	5,151
	Northumberland County	$38,679	$82,167	$4,579 million	11,839	5,573
	Nottoway County	$24,394	$68,529	$3,815 million	15,642	5,568
	Orange County	$33,313	$86,724	$12,077 million	36,254	13,926
	Page County	$26,321	$66,296	$6,240 million	23,709	9,413
	Patrick County	$27,939	$62,828	$4,919 million	17,608	7,830
	Pittsylvania County	$26,587	$61,382	$16,085 million	60,501	26,205
	Powhatan County	$39,850	$116,317	$12,087 million	30,333	10,392
	Prince Edward County	$21,051	$62,204	$4,599 million	21,849	7,394
	Prince George County	$31,193	$114,053	$13,416 million	43,010	11,763
	Prince William County	$42,298	$141,484	$203,962 million	482,204	144,159
	Pulaski County	$28,067	$64,684	$9,486 million	33,800	14,666
	Rappahannock County	$46,731	$121,464	$3,433 million	7,348	2,827
	Richmond County	$24,400	$74,080	$2,177 million	8,923	2,939
	Roanoke County	$37,859	$95,978	$36,696 million	96,929	38,234
	Rockbridge County	$33,177	$80,793	$7,514 million	22,650	9,301
	Rockingham County	$33,276	$89,027	$27,870 million	83,757	31,306
	Russell County	$22,030	$51,749	$5,679 million	25,781	10,975
	Scott County	$23,702	$58,713	$5,113 million	21,576	8,710
	Shenandoah County	$40,163	$101,171	$17,746 million	44,186	17,541
	Smyth County	$23,016	$54,031	$6,858 million	29,800	12,694
	Southampton County	$27,232	$74,050	$4,900 million	17,996	6,618
	Spotsylvania County	$38,731	$119,296	$54,235 million	140,032	45,463
	Stafford County	$43,401	$141,420	$68,107 million	156,927	48,160
	Surry County	$31,136	$73,114	$2,042 million	6,561	2,794
	Sussex County	$24,391	$69,654	$2,641 million	10,829	3,792
	Tazewell County	$25,648	$63,339	$10,369 million	40,429	16,371
	Warren County	$32,660	$90,850	$13,301 million	40,727	14,641
	Washington County	$28,987	$70,729	$15,634 million	53,935	22,104
	Westmoreland County	$33,754	$78,846	$6,236 million	18,477	7,910
	Wise County	$21,508	$52,097	$7,770 million	36,130	14,916
	Wythe County	$31,645	$72,237	$8,952 million	28,290	12,393
	York County	$41,994	$115,274	$29,414 million	70,045	25,517
	Waynesboro	$28,287	$68,476	$6,278 million	22,196	9,169
	Richmond	$35,682	$88,851	$80,858 million	226,610	91,005
	Chesapeake	$37,420	$107,870	$93,333 million	249,422	86,524
	Norfolk	$30,706	$81,748	$73,081 million	238,005	89,398
	Virginia Beach	$39,788	$106,008	$182,813 million	459,470	172,452
	Emporia	$19,612	$54,471	$1,130 million	5,766	2,076
	Newport News	$33,670	$82,915	$62,709 million	186,247	75,630
	Hampton	$30,596	$76,507	$41,961 million	137,148	54,847
	Suffolk	$38,613	$105,254	$36,421 million	94,324	34,603
	Portsmouth	$27,276	$72,871	$26,707 million	97,915	36,650
	Poquoson	$42,260	$113,678	$5,265 million	12,460	4,632
	Franklin	$25,900	$60,256	$2,118 million	8,180	3,516
	Falls Church	$73,288	$190,775	$10,742 million	14,658	5,631
	Fredericksburg	$36,785	$93,075	$10,293 million	27,982	11,059
	Williamsburg	$32,878	$113,075	$5,071 million	15,425	4,485
	Winchester	$31,719	$83,600	$8,919 million	28,120	10,669
	Lexington	$20,638	$73,122	$1,510 million	7,320	2,066
	Alexandria	$64,835	$145,029	$103,390 million	159,467	71,289
	Fairfax	$53,488	$147,585	$12,915 million	24,146	8,751
	Colonial Heights	$32,629	$83,573	$5,928 million	18,170	7,094
	Roanoke	$29,585	$70,965	$29,588 million	100,011	41,694
	Salem	$34,039	$87,358	$8,627 million	25,346	9,876
	Hopewell	$23,173	$57,011	$5,337 million	23,033	9,362
	Martinsville	$22,855	$55,065	$3,081 million	13,485	5,597
	Staunton	$30,746	$74,422	$7,917 million	25,750	10,638
	Manassas Park	$35,618	$132,149	$6,133 million	17,219	4,641
	Norton	$24,808	$48,730	$914 million	3,687	1,877
	Galax	$24,521	$63,037	$1,647 million	6,720	2,614
	Buena Vista	$30,647	$81,118	$2,035 million	6,641	2,509
	Bristol	$25,979	$59,787	$4,473 million	17,219	7,482
	Covington	$25,287	$60,903	$1,450 million	5,737	2,382
	Danville	$22,876	$53,338	$9,742 million	42,590	18,266
	Harrisonburg	$23,580	$72,937	$12,217 million	51,814	16,751
	Petersburg	$24,789	$62,685	$8,293 million	33,458	13,231
	Lynchburg	$23,683	$66,299	$18,711 million	79,009	28,223
	Radford	$22,637	$64,079	$3,637 million	16,070	5,677
	Charlottesville	$39,712	$98,262	$18,487 million	46,553	18,814
	Manassas	$34,198	$113,406	$14,627 million	42,772	12,898

Note: Data is automatically updated to be the latest on Wikidata. At the time of page automation this was the 2020 United States Census and the 2016–2020 American Community Survey.

Ranked Virginia's Per Capita Income Distribution by County latest official survey

Total Virginia per capita income (wikidata:Q1370) = 41,255 US$ (2020 survey methodology)

[Hide/show County Per Capita Income]
No.	Virginia	per capita income US$	year	Wikidata page
1	Falls Church, Virginia	73,288	2020	Q408744
2	Arlington County, Virginia	73,078	2020	Q107126
3	Alexandria, Virginia	64,835	2020	Q88
4	Fairfax County, Virginia	58,338	2020	Q341915
5	Loudoun County, Virginia	57,513	2020	Q495310
6	Fairfax, Virginia	53,488	2020	Q501785
7	Goochland County, Virginia	52,605	2020	Q506191
8	Lancaster County, Virginia	48,280	2020	Q505941
9	Fauquier County, Virginia	47,642	2020	Q502213
10	Rappahannock County, Virginia	46,731	2020	Q510920
11	Albemarle County, Virginia	46,241	2020	Q488653
12	James City County, Virginia	45,862	2020	Q337688
13	Fluvanna County, Virginia	44,149	2020	Q502014
14	Mathews County, Virginia	43,918	2020	Q336948
15	Stafford County, Virginia	43,401	2020	Q341755
16	Hanover County, Virginia	43,003	2020	Q341679
17	Chesterfield County, Virginia	42,734	2020	Q340608
18	Clarke County, Virginia	42,327	2020	Q495142
19	Prince William County, Virginia	42,298	2020	Q183263
20	Poquoson, Virginia	42,260	2020	Q349995
21	York County, Virginia	41,994	2020	Q506187
22	Henrico County, Virginia	41,437	2020	Q341639
23	New Kent County, Virginia	40,293	2020	Q337270
24	Shenandoah County, Virginia	40,163	2020	Q510947
25	Powhatan County, Virginia	39,850	2020	Q513792
26	Virginia Beach, Virginia	39,788	2020	Q49259
27	Charlottesville, Virginia	39,712	2020	Q123766
28	Isle of Wight County, Virginia	39,024	2020	Q338052
29	King George County, Virginia	38,926	2020	Q2613700
30	Spotsylvania County, Virginia	38,731	2020	Q506202
31	Northumberland County, Virginia	38,679	2020	Q505292
32	Suffolk, Virginia	38,613	2020	Q342428
33	Frederick County, Virginia	38,442	2020	Q502021
34	Nelson County, Virginia	38,364	2020	Q515150
35	Roanoke County, Virginia	37,859	2020	Q513968
36	Culpeper County, Virginia	37,507	2020	Q495154
37	Chesapeake, Virginia	37,420	2020	Q49222
38	Botetourt County, Virginia	37,357	2020	Q495132
39	Fredericksburg, Virginia	36,785	2020	Q492342
40	Charles City County, Virginia	36,325	2020	Q337348
41	Louisa County, Virginia	35,894	2020	Q515166
42	Richmond, Virginia	35,682	2020	Q43421
43	Manassas Park, Virginia	35,618	2020	Q502269
44	Caroline County, Virginia	35,588	2020	Q341708
45	King and Queen County, Virginia	34,873	2020	Q337067
46	Bedford County, Virginia	34,565	2020	Q494216
47	Gloucester County, Virginia	34,565	2020	Q335121
48	Bath County, Virginia	34,463	2020	Q495165
49	Madison County, Virginia	34,434	2020	Q513891
50	Manassas, Virginia	34,198	2020	Q511876
51	Salem, Virginia	34,039	2020	Q502230
52	Middlesex County, Virginia	33,992	2020	Q341865
53	Greene County, Virginia	33,913	2020	Q163097
54	Westmoreland County, Virginia	33,754	2020	Q494413
55	Newport News, Virginia	33,670	2020	Q335017
56	Orange County, Virginia	33,313	2020	Q506225
57	Rockingham County, Virginia	33,276	2020	Q513919
58	King William County, Virginia	33,261	2020	Q337204
59	Rockbridge County, Virginia	33,177	2020	Q513805
60	Williamsburg, Virginia	32,878	2020	Q492346
61	Amelia County, Virginia	32,799	2020	Q461562
62	Warren County, Virginia	32,660	2020	Q510934
63	Colonial Heights, Virginia	32,629	2020	Q501789
64	Franklin County, Virginia	32,084	2020	Q502036
65	Northampton County, Virginia	31,959	2020	Q49290
66	Winchester, Virginia	31,719	2020	Q492355
67	Wythe County, Virginia	31,645	2020	Q513950
68	Prince George County, Virginia	31,193	2020	Q337776
69	Surry County, Virginia	31,136	2020	Q506209
70	Highland County, Virginia	30,911	2020	Q505861
71	Staunton, Virginia	30,746	2020	Q502250
72	Norfolk, Virginia	30,706	2020	Q49231
73	Buena Vista, Virginia	30,647	2020	Q503014
74	Hampton, Virginia	30,596	2020	Q342043
75	Montgomery County, Virginia	30,581	2020	Q495120
76	Augusta County, Virginia	30,493	2020	Q285625
77	Craig County, Virginia	30,433	2020	Q495185
78	Dinwiddie County, Virginia	30,351	2020	Q340606
79	Roanoke, Virginia	29,585	2020	Q501796
80	Cumberland County, Virginia	29,160	2020	Q495116
81	Washington County, Virginia	28,987	2020	Q510915
82	Amherst County, Virginia	28,866	2020	Q470626
83	Waynesboro, Virginia	28,287	2020	Q501779
84	Campbell County, Virginia	28,173	2020	Q495171
85	Pulaski County, Virginia	28,067	2020	Q514038
86	Mecklenburg County, Virginia	28,048	2020	Q510885
87	Alleghany County, Virginia	28,048	2020	Q488675
88	Patrick County, Virginia	27,939	2020	Q514024
89	Appomattox County, Virginia	27,889	2020	Q490325
90	Giles County, Virginia	27,679	2020	Q951290
91	Floyd County, Virginia	27,306	2020	Q502031
92	Portsmouth, Virginia	27,276	2020	Q342803
93	Southampton County, Virginia	27,232	2020	Q337915
94	Accomack County, Virginia	27,012	2020	Q49289
95	Pittsylvania County, Virginia	26,587	2020	Q513744
96	Page County, Virginia	26,321	2020	Q513818
97	Essex County, Virginia	26,114	2020	Q182112
98	Bristol, Virginia	25,979	2020	Q503366
99	Franklin, Virginia	25,900	2020	Q350001
100	Tazewell County, Virginia	25,648	2020	Q506197
101	Dickenson County, Virginia	25,485	2020	Q495169
102	Covington, Virginia	25,287	2020	Q511908
103	Norton, Virginia	24,808	2020	Q502984
104	Petersburg, Virginia	24,789	2020	Q511964
105	Grayson County, Virginia	24,770	2020	Q502207
106	Galax, Virginia	24,521	2020	Q503000
107	Brunswick County, Virginia	24,493	2020	Q494180
108	Carroll County, Virginia	24,476	2020	Q488917
109	Richmond County, Virginia	24,400	2020	Q505854
110	Nottoway County, Virginia	24,394	2020	Q515220
111	Sussex County, Virginia	24,391	2020	Q340591
112	Halifax County, Virginia	24,368	2020	Q505886
113	Charlotte County, Virginia	24,337	2020	Q427732
114	Scott County, Virginia	23,702	2020	Q505834
115	Lynchburg, Virginia	23,683	2020	Q844012
116	Bland County, Virginia	23,664	2020	Q495112
117	Harrisonburg, Virginia	23,580	2020	Q511935
118	Hopewell, Virginia	23,173	2020	Q502235
119	Henry County, Virginia	23,051	2020	Q505841
120	Buckingham County, Virginia	23,045	2020	Q495204
121	Smyth County, Virginia	23,016	2020	Q378896
122	Danville, Virginia	22,876	2020	Q511922
123	Martinsville, Virginia	22,855	2020	Q502240
124	Radford, Virginia	22,637	2020	Q586070
125	Buchanan County, Virginia	22,092	2020	Q495181
126	Russell County, Virginia	22,030	2020	Q507117
127	Lunenburg County, Virginia	21,602	2020	Q508192
128	Wise County, Virginia	21,508	2020	Q513982
129	Prince Edward County, Virginia	21,051	2020	Q505884
130	Lexington, Virginia	20,638	2020	Q501761
131	Greensville County, Virginia	20,011	2020	Q340605
132	Emporia, Virginia	19,612	2020	Q177678
133	Lee County, Virginia	19,126	2020	Q514008

Virginia counties and cities by per capita income (2010).

Virginia counties and cities by median family income (2010).

Virginia counties and cities by median household income (2010).

== Historic per capita income and household income by location ==
Rank	County or City		Per capita income	Median household income	Median family income	Population	Number of households
1	Arlington	County	$57,724	$94,880	$126,947	207,627	98,050
2	Falls Church	City	$55,389	$114,409	$142,035	12,332	5,101
3	Alexandria	City	$54,345	$80,847	$102,017	139,966	68,082
4	Fairfax	County	$49,001	$105,416	$124,316	1,081,726	391,627
5	Loudoun	County	$45,356	$115,574	$130,432	312,311	104,583
6	Fairfax	City	$44,008	$97,900	$110,240	22,565	8,347
7	Fauquier	County	$38,710	$83,877	$97,548	72,972	23,658
8	Goochland	County	$38,553	$79,574	$91,500	21,717	7,998
9	James City	County	$38,162	$73,903	$86,756	67,009	26,860
10	Rappahannock	County	$37,149	$62,117	$75,975	7,373	3,072
11	Poquoson	City	$36,840	$84,315	$92,479	12,150	4,525
12	Albemarle	County	$36,685	$64,847	$83,894	98,970	38,157
13	York	County	$35,823	$81,055	$92,597	65,464	24,006
14	Prince William	County	$35,737	$91,098	$99,494	402,002	130,785
15	Stafford	County	$34,691	$93,065	$101,321	128,961	41,769
16	Clarke	County	$34,630	$73,244	$85,946	14,034	5,509
17	Hanover	County	$34,201	$76,425	$87,756	99,863	36,589
18	Henrico	County	$33,001	$60,114	$75,140	306,935	124,601
19	King George	County	$32,630	$76,241	$87,155	23,584	8,376
	Virginia	State	$32,145	$61,406	$73,514	8,001,024	3,056,058
20	New Kent	County	$31,741	$70,590	$78,718	18,429	6,813
21	Chesterfield	County	$31,711	$71,321	$82,226	316,236	115,680
22	Roanoke	County	$31,046	$59,446	$74,660	92,376	37,608
23	Spotsylvania	County	$31,012	$76,574	$84,723	122,397	41,942
24	Virginia Beach	City	$30,873	$64,618	$73,795	437,994	165,089
25	Isle of Wight	County	$29,547	$62,242	$71,732	35,270	13,718
26	Botetourt	County	$29,540	$64,724	$73,032	33,148	13,126
27	Fluvanna	County	$29,407	$68,223	$74,529	25,691	9,449
28	Chesapeake	City	$29,306	$67,855	$77,561	222,209	79,574
29	Lancaster	County	$29,275	$45,209	$55,083	11,391	5,265
30	Warren	County	$29,098	$60,522	$72,370	37,575	14,085
31	Manassas	City	$28,941	$75,173	$79,893	37,821	12,527
32	Northumberland	County	$28,646	$51,944	$60,872	12,330	5,540
33	Middlesex	County	$28,539	$50,207	$63,750	10,959	4,708
34	Suffolk	City	$28,441	$65,104	$76,586	84,585	30,868
35	Frederick	County	$27,977	$61,973	$68,771	78,305	28,864
36	Fredericksburg	City	$27,870	$43,558	$65,699	24,286	9,505
37	Bedford	County	$27,732	$54,110	$65,508	68,676	27,465
38	Louisa	County	$27,562	$54,257	$62,703	33,153	12,944
39	Culpeper	County	$27,507	$65,132	$75,462	46,689	16,231
40	Westmoreland	County	$27,501	$52,990	$59,613	17,454	7,310
41	Gloucester	County	$27,395	$59,331	$68,461	36,858	14,293
42	Manassas Park	City	$27,335	$70,299	$75,333	14,273	4,507
	United States	Country	$27,334	$51,914	$62,982	308,745,538	116,716,292
43	Salem	City	$27,081	$48,828	$64,254	24,802	10,045
44	Mathews	County	$27,011	$47,435	$55,853	8,978	3,858
45	Nelson	County	$26,996	$48,118	$57,356	15,020	6,396
46	King William	County	$26,853	$64,946	$75,260	15,935	5,979
47	Orange	County	$26,447	$54,916	$63,886	33,481	12,895
48	Winchester	City	$26,341	$44,873	$56,260	26,203	10,607
49	Colonial Heights	City	$26,115	$50,571	$64,154	17,411	7,275
50	Madison	County	$26,081	$56,608	$65,164	13,308	5,083
51	Richmond	City	$26,034	$38,266	$47,364	204,214	87,151
52	Powhatan	County	$25,851	$73,593	$81,476	28,046	9,494
53	Prince George	County	$25,769	$64,171	$71,769	35,725	11,451
54	Highland	County	$25,690	$43,481	$51,326	2,321	1,081
55	Rockingham	County	$25,274	$49,930	$58,067	76,314	29,177
56	Caroline	County	$25,024	$57,690	$65,949	28,545	10,456
57	Greene	County	$24,969	$54,307	$60,414	18,403	6,780
58	Charlottesville	City	$24,578	$42,240	$62,378	43,475	17,778
59	Shenandoah	County	$24,502	$50,171	$61,363	41,993	17,076
60	Newport News	City	$24,249	$49,562	$57,969	180,719	70,664
61	Amelia	County	$24,197	$50,135	$58,029	12,690	4,821
62	Norton	City	$24,145	$33,944	$49,775	3,958	1,750
63	Staunton	City	$24,077	$42,724	$57,842	23,746	10,480
64	Hampton	City	$24,051	$49,815	$61,310	137,436	55,031
65	Charles City	County	$23,955	$46,337	$54,536	7,256	2,955
66	Surry	County	$23,835	$55,030	$67,995	7,058	2,826
67	Essex	County	$23,795	$46,235	$52,810	11,151	4,517
68	Norfolk	City	$23,773	$42,677	$51,022	242,803	86,485
69	Rockbridge	County	$23,753	$44,417	$53,889	22,307	9,555
70	Augusta	County	$23,571	$50,612	$60,506	73,750	28,516
71	Franklin	County	$23,527	$45,555	$53,066	56,159	22,780
72	Washington	County	$23,488	$40,422	$51,276	54,876	22,843
73	Craig	County	$23,461	$51,291	$63,134	5,190	2,183
74	Dinwiddie	County	$23,423	$51,459	$60,400	28,001	10,504
75	Northampton	County	$23,233	$35,760	$47,995	12,389	5,323
76	Waynesboro	City	$23,190	$40,977	$47,585	21,006	8,903
77	Page	County	$22,969	$41,617	$51,543	24,042	9,746
78	Williamsburg	City	$22,851	$50,794	$71,190	14,068	4,571
79	Accomack	County	$22,766	$41,372	$49,727	33,164	13,798
80	Roanoke	City	$22,530	$36,422	$46,322	97,032	42,712
81	Appomattox	County	$22,388	$49,224	$58,954	14,973	6,033
82	Portsmouth	City	$22,302	$45,488	$52,830	95,535	37,324
83	Bath	County	$22,083	$50,589	$50,974	4,731	2,162
84	Campbell	County	$22,044	$43,478	$53,566	54,842	22,441
85	Montgomery	County	$22,040	$43,229	$65,654	94,392	35,767
86	Alleghany	County	$22,013	$43,160	$53,205	16,250	6,891
87	King and Queen	County	$21,777	$44,442	$49,917	6,945	2,882
88	Lynchburg	City	$21,586	$37,058	$50,196	75,568	28,476
89	Floyd	County	$21,425	$42,044	$50,759	15,279	6,415
90	Southampton	County	$21,201	$45,426	$56,830	18,570	6,719
91	Amherst	County	$21,097	$44,757	$55,211	32,353	12,560
92	Giles	County	$20,985	$41,186	$48,966	17,286	7,215
93	Pulaski	County	$20,976	$41,163	$48,884	34,872	14,821
94	Covington	City	$20,781	$35,277	$47,188	5,961	2,632
95	Pittsylvania	County	$20,652	$39,224	$49,166	63,506	26,183
96	Wythe	County	$20,589	$38,948	$47,119	29,235	12,472
97	Bland	County	$20,468	$41,552	$45,534	6,824	2,566
98	Nottoway	County	$20,318	$37,344	$44,559	15,853	5,706
99	Mecklenburg	County	$20,162	$36,431	$46,192	32,727	13,495
100	Bedford	City	$20,092	$32,262	$41,026	6,222	2,627
101	Richmond	County	$19,965	$42,182	$60,250	9,254	3,159
102	Halifax	County	$19,909	$34,705	$44,518	36,241	15,085
103	Smyth	County	$19,906	$34,864	$43,790	32,208	13,319
104	Martinsville	City	$19,766	$32,408	$43,176	13,821	6,084
105	Bristol	City	$19,700	$32,079	$39,212	17,835	7,879
106	Cumberland	County	$19,691	$40,143	$50,007	10,052	3,980
107	Galax	City	$19,609	$22,333	$38,513	7,042	2,922
108	Grayson	County	$19,499	$32,178	$40,205	15,533	6,846
109	Franklin	City	$19,453	$33,174	$41,821	8,582	3,530
110	Emporia	City	$19,245	$32,788	$39,410	5,927	2,316
111	Henry	County	$19,206	$34,086	$42,637	54,151	23,151
112	Hopewell	City	$19,148	$37,789	$43,862	22,591	9,129
113	Petersburg	City	$19,142	$36,449	$44,233	32,420	13,634
114	Buena Vista	City	$19,030	$39,955	$46,081	6,650	2,603
115	Tazewell	County	$19,016	$35,215	$43,428	45,078	18,449
116	Danville	City	$18,840	$29,936	$39,198	43,055	18,831
117	Carroll	County	$18,670	$36,142	$44,882	30,042	12,831
118	Scott	County	$18,667	$34,250	$43,112	23,177	9,775
119	Patrick	County	$18,396	$35,813	$41,130	18,490	8,081
120	Prince Edward	County	$18,192	$36,191	$49,824	23,368	7,916
121	Wise	County	$17,944	$33,608	$41,625	41,452	15,968
122	Russell	County	$17,909	$32,780	$42,648	28,897	11,943
123	Lunenburg	County	$17,744	$37,424	$41,968	12,914	4,957
124	Greensville	County	$17,631	$38,574	$49,741	12,243	3,566
125	Charlotte	County	$17,348	$34,881	$48,266	12,586	5,109
126	Lexington	City	$17,022	$31,571	$62,109	7,042	2,237
127	Buckingham	County	$16,752	$34,720	$43,589	17,146	5,965
128	Harrisonburg	City	$16,750	$37,235	$53,529	48,914	15,988
129	Buchanan	County	$16,742	$29,183	$36,829	24,098	9,968
130	Brunswick	County	$16,739	$35,184	$43,018	17,434	6,366
131	Sussex	County	$16,735	$37,978	$48,817	12,087	3,994
132	Lee	County	$16,513	$31,352	$41,204	25,587	10,159
133	Radford	City	$16,496	$29,155	$58,258	16,408	5,990
134	Dickenson	County	$16,278	$29,080	$34,077	15,903	6,590

Note: Data is from the 2010 United States Census Data and the 2006-2010 American Community Survey 5-Year Estimates.
