= Sailo =

Online platform for boat and yacht rentals

- Company type: Private
- Founded: 2014
- Headquarters: New York City, New York
- Key people: Adrian Grădinaru; Magda Marca; Delphine Braas
- Website: www.sailo.com

Sailo, based in New York, is an American company that operates an online marketplace focused on boat and yacht rentals. The platform connects boat owners, licensed captains, and renters with people seeking to rent a boat.

== History ==
Sailo was launched in September 2014 by Silicon Valley entrepreneurs and engineers Adrian Grădinaru, Magda Marcu, and Delphine Braas. Gradinaru came up with the idea after he found the experience of renting crewed boat overly complicated. The company initially had a presence primarily in Miami and New York before it expanded internationally two years later. In 2016, the company's fleet numbered around 4000 boats.

In December 2015, Sailo completed a 13-week startup accelerator program from Techstars. It has raised multiple rounds of funding from angel investors.

In August 2016, Sailo launched an iOS app.

In June 2019, Romania's Neogen Group acquired a 9.4% stake in Sailo.

== Services ==
Sailo connects private and boat charters globally with potential renters. It has been described as the “Airbnb of the Boat World/Boats” by The Wall Street Journal, El Nuevo Herald, and Vogue, while Forbes dubbed it “the next Airbnb for luxury yacht rentals”.

Unlike other boat rental companies, Sailo allows boat owners to rent their boat with or without a United States Coast Guard licensed captain, although renters are expected to provide the necessary paperwork and licenses before being able to operate the vessels themselves. Instant booking, overnight charters, complete insurance, and fraud protection are offered, among other services.

Sailo's inventory includes speedboats, sailboats, catamarans, and superyachts. The majority of Sailo's boats (90 percent in May 2018) are charter operated.

In November 2016, Sailo launched its first Florida-to-Cuba charters.
