= Icon Norfolk =

Historic commercial building in Virginia, United States

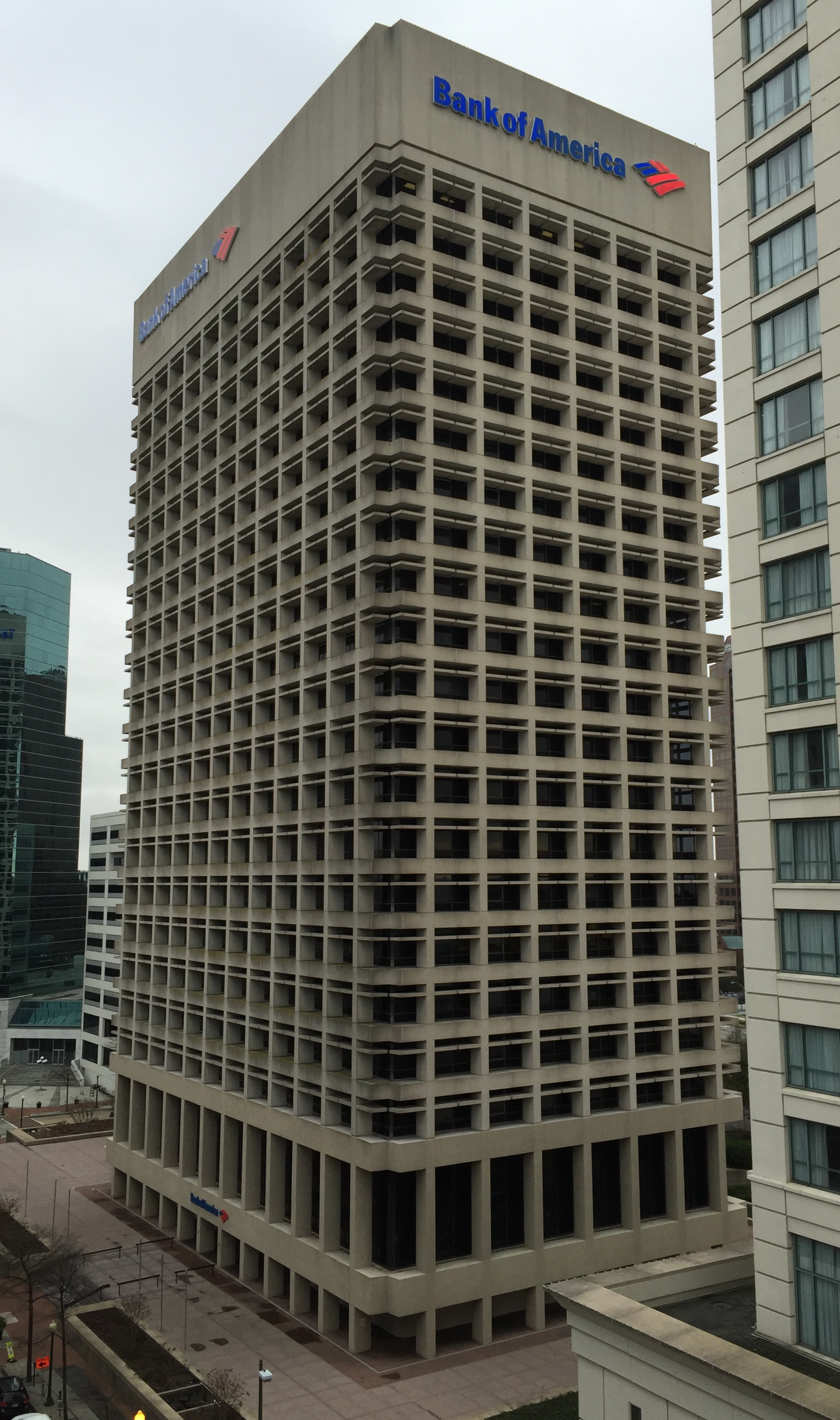
- Bank of America Center prior to conversion to luxury apartments
- Interactive map of the Icon Norfolk area

General information
- Status: Completed
- Type: Residential
- Location: 321 E. Main St. Norfolk, Virginia 23510
- Coordinates: 36°50′35.5″N 76°17′16″W
- Opening: 1967

Height
- Roof: 315 ft (96 m)

Technical details
- Floor count: 23
- Floor area: 340,000 sq ft (32,000 m^{2})

Design and construction
- Architects: Skidmore, Owings & Merrill
- Virginia National Bank Headquarters Historic District
- U.S. National Register of Historic Places
- U.S. Historic district
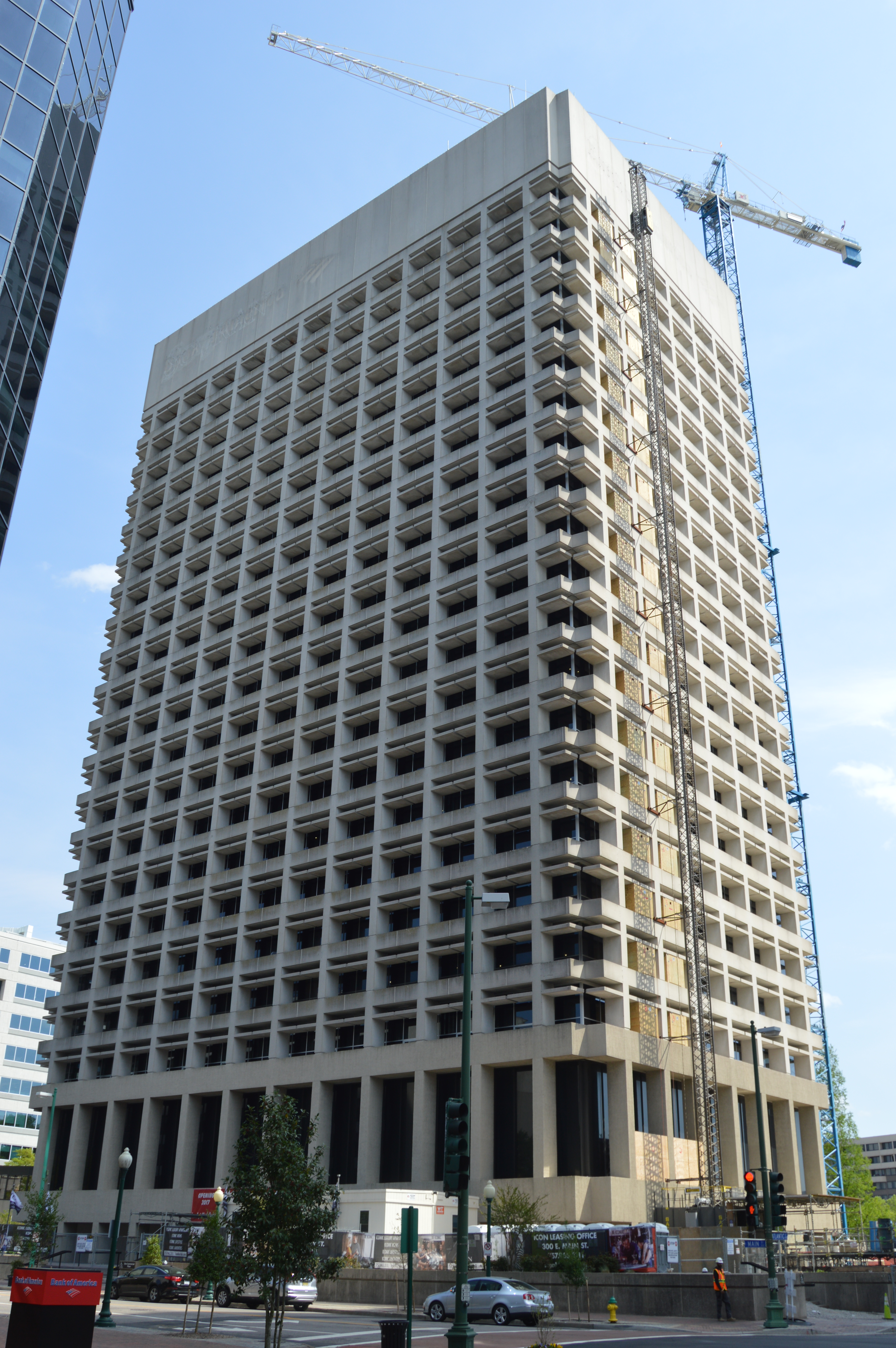

- Location within Virginia Location within the United States
- Location: Bounded by Commercial Place, Waterside Dr., and E. Plume and Atlantic Sts., Norfolk, Virginia
- Coordinates: 36°50′44″N 76°17′23″W
- Area: 0.1 acres (0.040 ha)
- Built: 1965-1967
- Architect: Skidmore, Owings & Merrill
- Architectural style: Mid-Century Modern
- NRHP reference No.: 16000535
- Added to NRHP: August 15, 2016

The Icon Norfolk (formerly Bank of America Center) is a building in downtown Norfolk, Virginia, United States, constructed in 1965–67 to a design by Skidmore, Owings & Merrill. It is part of the Virginia National Bank Headquarters Historic District, which also includes an adjacent parking garage and public plaza, bounded by East Main and Atlantic Streets, Commercial Place, and Waterside Drive. The accompanying plaza and garage formed part of the design, and are a significant example of mid-20th century architecture and landscape design principles. Its construction marked the start of a revitalization and transformation of downtown Norfolk. The district was listed on the National Register of Historic Places in 2016.

== History ==
The tower was designed by Skidmore, Owings & Merrill, one of the country's leading architectural firms, and constructed from 1965 to 1967. The building was the tallest in the state of Virginia from 1967 to 1971, when it was surpassed in height by Richmond City Hall. Conceived as the headquarters for Virginia National Bank (VNB), the building retained headquarters status for Sovran Bank, formed from the merger of VNB and First & Merchants Bank of Richmond in 1983. After a series of mergers beginning in 1990 (including NationsBank), the building became the regional office for Bank of America in 1998, and was named after the bank.

In 2010, the building was losing tenants to newer office towers in Downtown Norfolk, including the Wells Fargo Center, while the Maersk Line Limited shipping company retained its headquarters there.

In late 2015, developers announced plans to convert the building to a 300-unit luxury apartment tower with ground-level retail. The building was renamed Icon Norfolk, part of a larger project known as CityWalk which would redeveloped an adjacent office building at 2 Commercial Place. In August 2016, Bank of America announced its relocation to 999 Waterside Drive, the former Dominion Tower, several blocks away. The building was renamed the Icon Norfolk, and the address was modified to 321 E. Main Street.

== See also ==
- National Register of Historic Places listings in Norfolk, Virginia
