= Nevada Career Institute =

American for-profit technical college

Coordinates: 36.217879°N 115.208377°W

- Type: For-profit
- Established: 1993
- Location: Las Vegas, Nevada, United States of America
- Website: nevadacareerinstitute.com
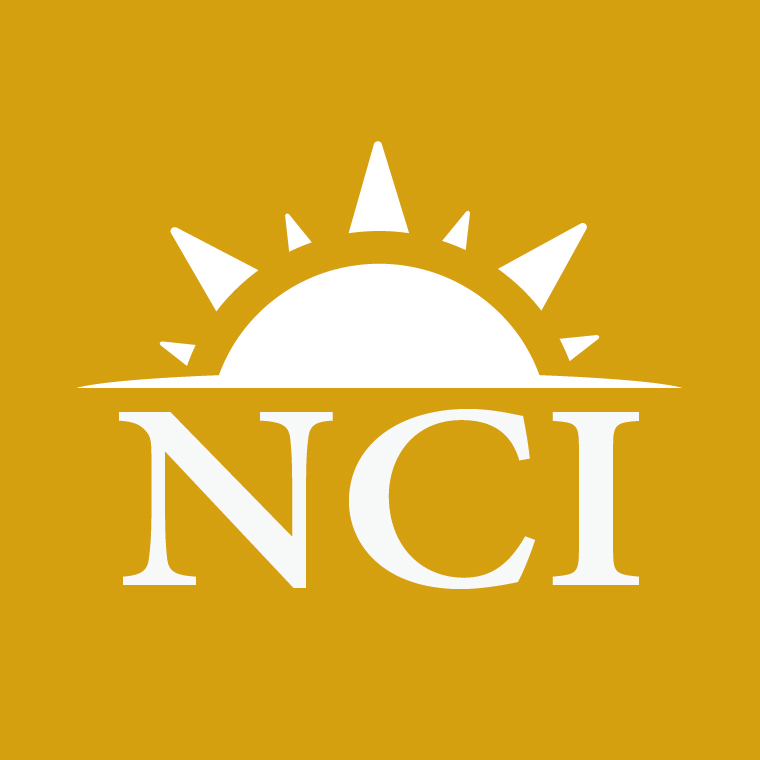

Nevada Career Institute is a for-profit technical college in Las Vegas, Nevada. Nevada Career Institute is owned and operated by the Fuerst family of Success Education Colleges.

== History ==
Established in 1993, Nevada Career Institute is a career college founded to provide prospective students with training in the medical field. In 2008 the school was acquired by Success Education Colleges for an undisclosed amount. Nevada Career Institute has a total enrollment of 207 students, consisting of 24.2% men, and 75.8% women.

== Academics ==
Nevada Career Institute provides a curriculum of career programs offering associate and bachelor's degrees related to healthcare.

=== Accreditation ===
Nevada Career Institute is accredited with the following establishments:

- Accredited by the Accrediting Bureau of Health Education Schools (ABHES).
- Surgical Technology programs at Nevada Career Institute are accredited by the Commission on Accreditation of Allied Health Education Programs (CAAHEP).
- Licensed Practical Nursing Programs at Nevada Career Institute are approved by the Nevada State Board of Nursing.
- Nevada Career Institute is licensed by the Commission of Postsecondary Education (CPE).
- Nevada Career Institute is eligible for Federal Title IV Student Financial Aid Programs U.S. Department of Education.
- Nevada Career Institute is eligible to Train Veterans and Eligible Persons for Educational Benefits. Train Workforce Investment Act (WIA) & other Eligible Persons such as Vocational Rehabilitation.

== Campus ==
The Nevada Career Institute is located off of the 95 Freeway.
