= HispanicBusiness 500 =

The HispanicBusiness 500 was a directory published by HispanTelligence of the 500 largest Hispanic-owned business in the United States. The list was published for 31 years, ending at 2013. To be included in the list, a company must have had at least 51 percent ownership by a U.S. Hispanic citizen. The last edition of the list, published in 2013, was dominated by Florida companies, headed by Brightstar Corporation.

== See also ==
- Fortune 500
- Forbes 500
