= TowneBank =

Bank based in Virginia, United States

- Company type: Public company
- Traded as: Nasdaq: TOWN; Russell 3000 component
- Industry: Financial services
- Founded: September 3, 1998; 27 years ago
- Headquarters: Suffolk, Virginia, U.S.
- Number of locations: 44 branches
- Key people: Bob Aston, chairman Billy Foster, president and chief executive officer
- Products: Banking, investments
- Revenue: ▲$686.935 million (2022)
- Net income: ▼$188.987 million (2022)
- Total assets: ▼$15.845 billion (2022)
- Total equity: ▼$1.889 billion (2022)
- Number of employees: 2,766 (2022)
- Website: www.townebank.com

TowneBank is a bank headquartered in Suffolk, Virginia with 44 branches in Virginia and North Carolina. They have owned the naming rights to TowneBank Stadium and TowneBank Tower press box facility at Dowdy–Ficklen Stadium since 2019.

While remaining headquartered in Suffolk, their financial services wing, which includes mortgage, insurance, and benefits, operates out of the TowneBank Tower in Downtown Norfolk, Virginia.

On August 19, 2025, TowneBank announced plans to acquire Dogwood State Bank, a Raleigh-based community bank, in an all-stock transaction valued at $476.2 million. As of June 30, 2025, Dogwood State Bank had $2.4 billion in assets and operated 17 branches in North Carolina, South Carolina, and Tennessee. The deal requires regulatory approval and is expected to close in 2026.
