= Dominion Tower =

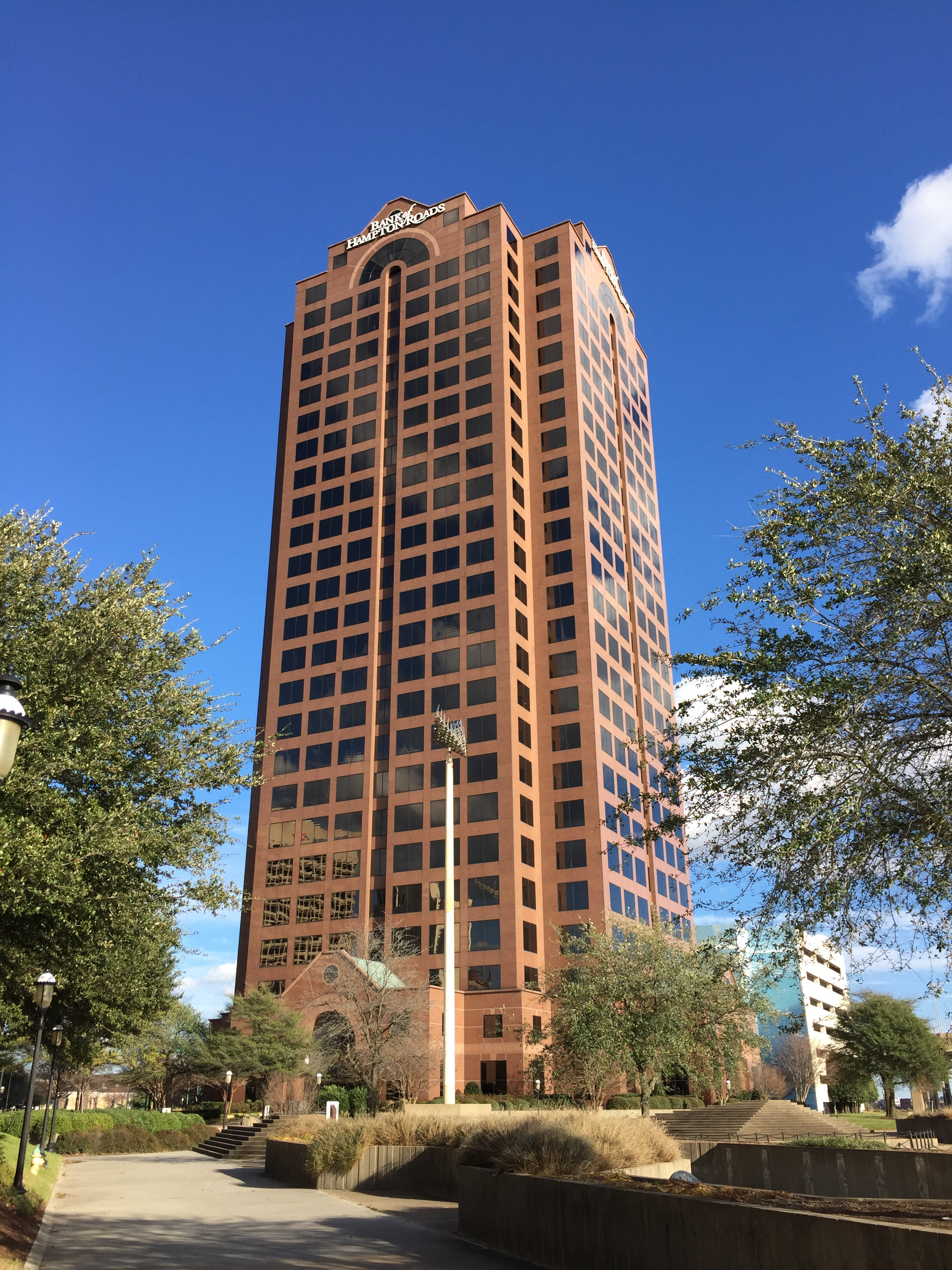
- View of the tower from over the Elizabeth River.
- Interactive map of the Dominion Tower area

General information
- Status: Completed
- Type: Office
- Location: 999 Waterside Drive; Norfolk, Virginia 23510
- Coordinates: 36°50′35.5″N 76°17′16″W
- Opening: 1987

Height
- Roof: 340 ft (100 m)

Technical details
- Floor count: 26

Design and construction
- Architects: HKS, Inc.

Dominion Tower is a building in Downtown Norfolk, Virginia, United States. Once the tallest building in the Hampton Roads metro area, it remains the tallest building in the City of Norfolk, having been surpassed by the mid-2000s construction of the Armada Hoffler Tower and Westin Virginia Beach Town Center tower in neighboring Virginia Beach. The 26-story, 403,276 square foot tower was named after the state of Virginia's nickname: "The Old Dominion" and comprises a cafe, a full-service restaurant, wine shop, and a packing and shipping office. The tower's completion and opening took place in 1987. Today, various corporations have offices in the building.

In late 2016, Bank of America moved its regional headquarters and affixed its signage to the building, replacing the signage of the Bank of Hampton Roads, which relocated its headquarters to Virginia Beach in 2012 but maintained a branch in the building.

== See also ==
- List of tallest buildings in Norfolk, Virginia
- List of tallest buildings in Virginia
- Norfolk, Virginia
