= Dominion Enterprises Building =

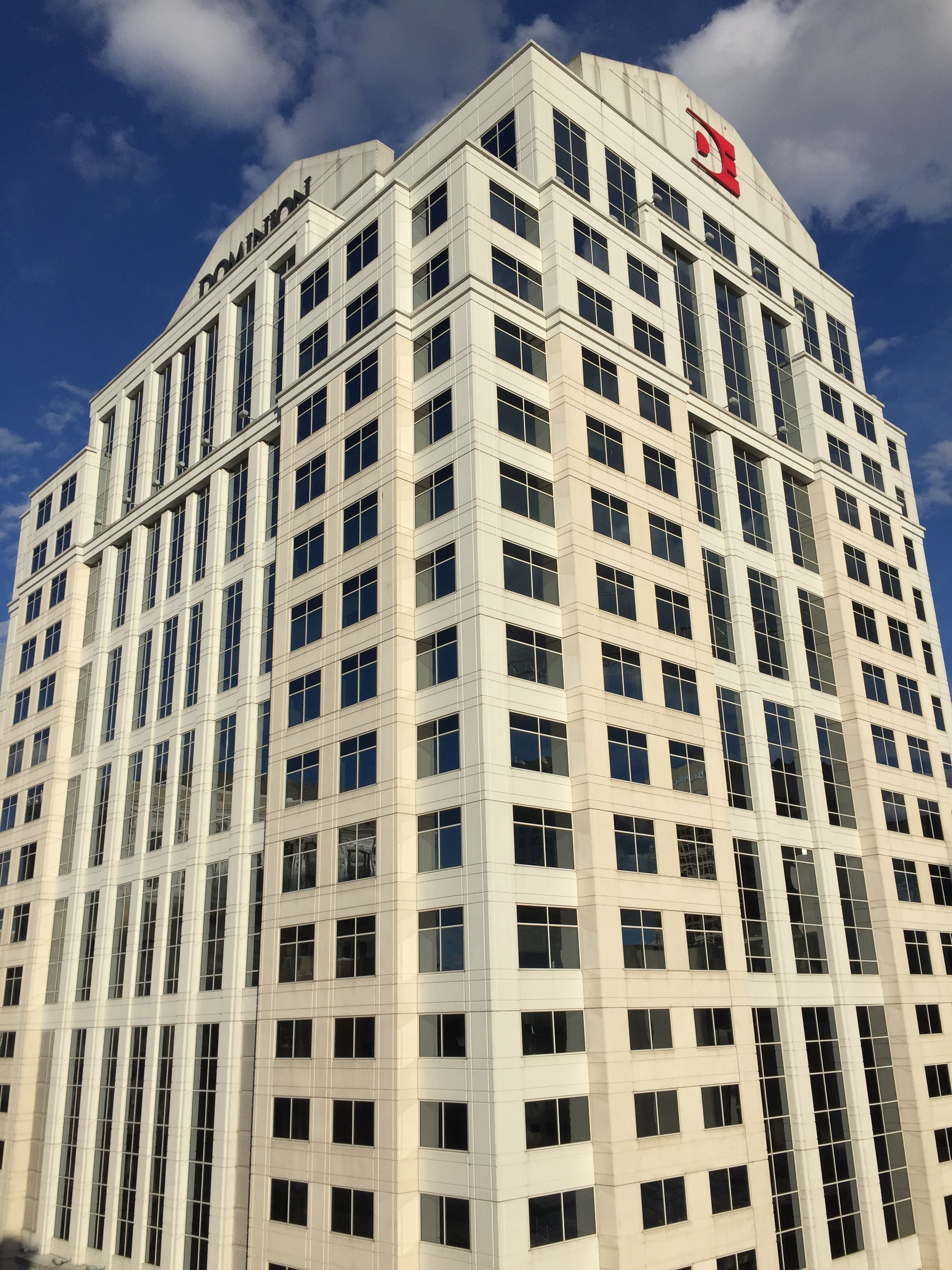
- Interactive map of the Dominion Enterprises Building area

General information
- Status: Completed
- Type: Office
- Location: 150 Granby Street; Norfolk, Virginia 23510
- Coordinates: 36°50′51.1″N 76°17′28.8″W
- Construction started: 2005
- Completed: 2006
- Opening: 2007
- Cost: $51,000,000
- Owner: Dominion Enterprises

Height
- Roof: 276 ft (84 m)

Technical details
- Floor count: 20
- Lifts/elevators: 8

Design and construction
- Architects: CMSS Architects, PC

The Dominion Enterprises Building is a 20-story commercial office building located in downtown Norfolk, Virginia on Granby Street. The 500,000 square foot building was opened in 2007 and is owned by Dominion Enterprises. It contains a Heritage Bank branch on the first floor.

== See also ==
- List of tallest buildings in Norfolk, Virginia
- List of tallest buildings in Virginia
- Norfolk, Virginia
