= Dominion Enterprises =

US software and information services company

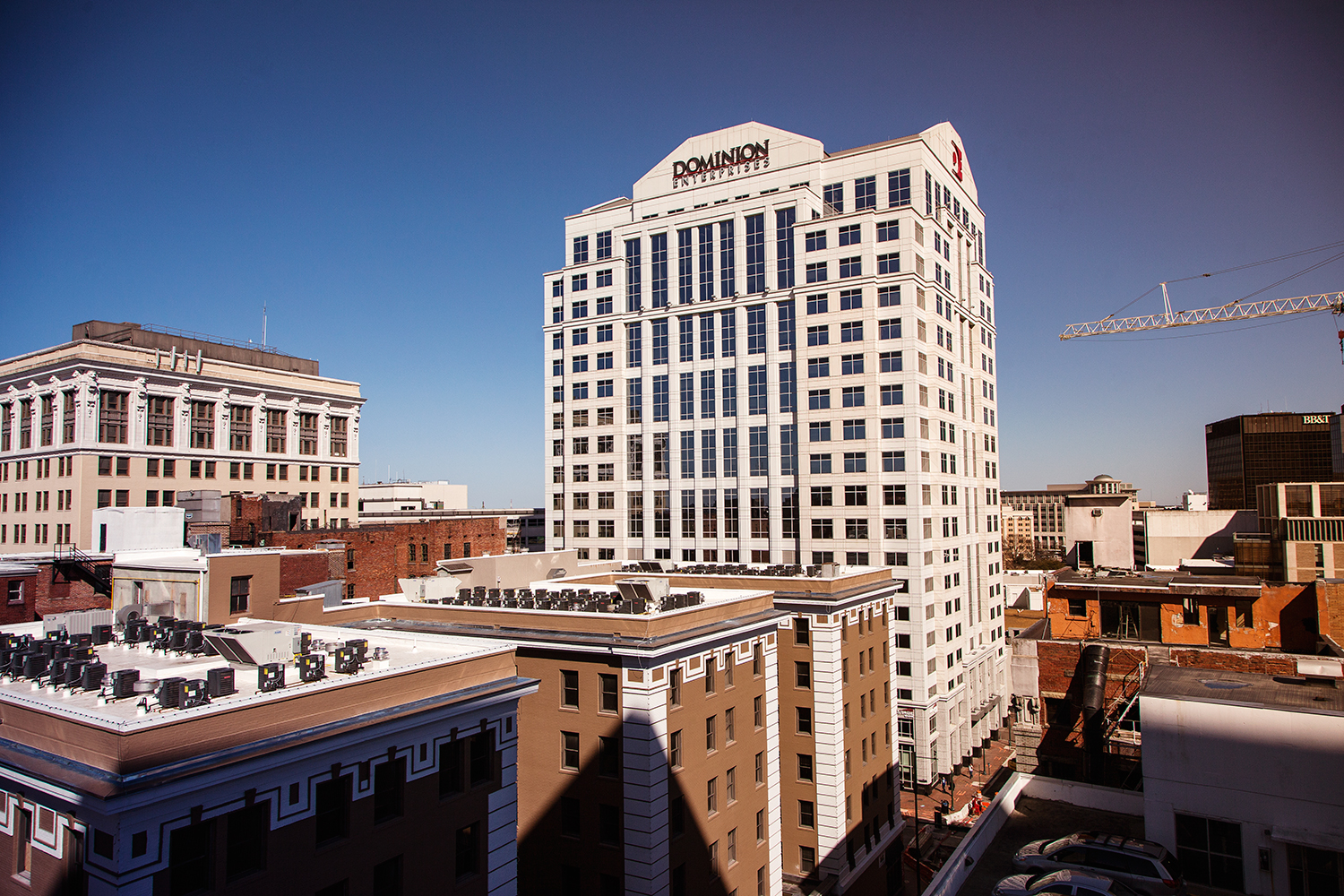
- The Dominion Enterprises Building in downtown Norfolk, Virginia
- Type: Subsidiary
- Industry: Technology
- Founded: 2006; 20 years ago, in Virginia, United States
- Headquarters: Norfolk, Virginia, United States
- Area served: Worldwide
- Key people: Charles Watkins (president and CEO)
- Products: Software and Information services
- Parent: Landmark Media Enterprises LLC
- Website: dominionenterprises.com

Dominion Enterprises is a Norfolk, Virginia-based software and information services company for the automotive, power sports, real estate, travel and franchising industries. The businesses owned by Dominion Enterprises include DominionDMS, Activator, Dealer Specialties, Cross-Sell, DataOne Software, Prime Street, Franchise Ventures, DX1, ZiiDMS, and Travel Media Group.

== History ==
Dominion Enterprises was established in September 2006 by Landmark Communications, Inc. following a division of assets of its predecessor company, Trader Publishing, between shared owners Landmark and Cox Enterprises.

In May 2017, it sold Dominion Web Solutions to European firm Eurazeo and Goldman Sachs Group’s merchant banking division for $680 million.

In September, the company sold ForRent.com to CoStar Group for $350 million in cash and $35 million worth of stock.

In April 2021, Dominion Enterprises announced the sale of Homes.com to CoStar Group Inc. for $156 million.
