= Click and Boat =

French Boat sharing website

Click&Boat
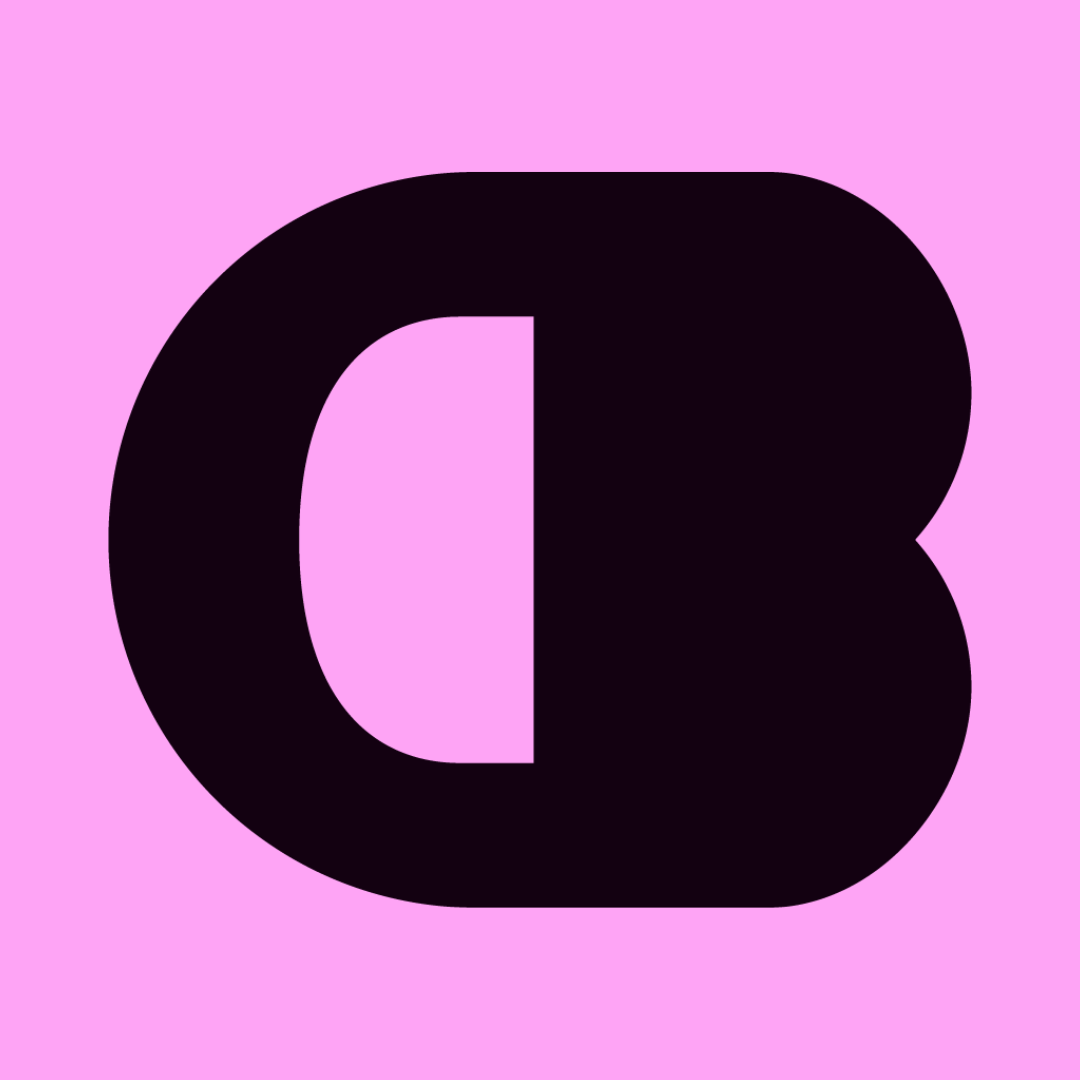
- Industry: Internet Portal
- Founded: September 2013; 13 years ago
- Founders: Jeremy Bismuth; Edouard Gorioux
- Headquarters: Paris, France
- Revenue: 26,690,000 euro (2024)
- Net income: 958,100 euro (2024)
- Number of employees: 110
- Website: www.clickandboat.com

Click and Boat (aka Click&Boat) is a company based in Paris that operates a boat rental platform, enabling private and professional boat owners to rent out their boats to holidaymakers and other sailing enthusiasts, based on the gig economy model. The company was set up in September 2013 by French entrepreneurs Edouard Gorioux and Jérémy Bismuth.

In August 2020, the platform featured 35,000 listed boats in Europe and globally, accessible to more than 400,000 registered members. The platform is available in English (US, UK and international business English), French, German, Spanish, Italian, Russian, Greek, Dutch, Polish, Portuguese and Swedish.

== History ==
Jérémy Bismuth and Edouard Gorioux, two entrepreneurs from Marseille and Brittany respectively, set up Click&Boat in September 2013, launching the website in December 2013. The startup raised €200,000 from private investors in April 2014. A month later, Click and Boat joined the incubator of Paris Dauphine University with five members of staff. By June 2014, more than 500 boats in France and Europe were available on the platform. The company offers a wide range of boats, from speedboats to houseboats (barges). In December 2014, one year after the launch of the platform, Click and Boat launched its first mobile application. Between July 2014 and July 2015, the company grew by 1,000%. By September 2015, boat owners listing their boats on the platform had earned €2m, while the company raised €500,000 in December 2015 to expand its services. The same month, the Click and Boat team took part in the Paris International Boat Show. In November 2016, the company bought its French competitor Sailsharing and established itself as the leader in peer-to-peer boat rental in France, increasing its boat listings by 30%. The same month, shortly before its participation in the Salon Nautique International of Paris, the startup announced a funding round of €1m raised from OLMA Fund to accelerate its international development, bringing the total amount of raised capital since its launch to €1.7m. The company launched its US homepage in February 2017. Overall, bookings made in 2017 were worth €15m.

In November 2017, Click and Boat announced the opening of the platform to professional yacht charter companies, with a target of 30,000 listed boats in 50 countries by the end of 2018. Two months later, in January 2018, French sailor Francois Gabart joined the company as a shareholder and official ambassador, listing his own boat on the platform.

In June 2018, Click&Boat raised €4m from previous investors to accelerate its international development. The company's co-founder Edouard Gorioux said to CNN: "Our target is to become the international leader, as Airbnb is for apartments". The majority of bookings are made by non-French customers. The company opened an office in Marseille in March 2019, hiring 50 new members of staff. Marseille is close to the Calanques, a popular boating destination in Southern France. As well as a new office in Miami, Florida, USA, in April 2019. By August 2019, the platform offered more than 30,000 boats in over 50 countries worldwide.

Click and Boat makes its first international acquisition of its German competitor Scansail in March 2020.

In July 2020, the Click and Boat Group opened their fifth office in Barcelona and became the benchmark in global nautical tourism with an addition 10,000 boats on their platform after the acquisition of their number one competitor Nautal.

In July 2021, the Click and Boat Group partnered with investment fund Permira and Boats Group to consolidate its international position.

== Business model ==
Click&Boat connects private and professional boat owners with sailing enthusiasts. The former can thus make a profit out of their vessels, since these can often be expensive to maintain and leave the marina 10 days per year on average. Hiring a boat through a private owner can be up to three times cheaper than doing this through a professional company. The company's business model is based on two concurrent trends: the collaborative consumption or sharing economy, where use as a service is preferred over ownership, and the rise of online tourism through travel websites. CNN referred to the company as ‘the Airbnb of the Seas’, while The Times dubbed it ‘the Uber of the boating world’. Since 2015 the company has been running a profit, doubling its turnover on an annual basis.

== Operation ==
Owners can choose to rent out their boats with or without a skipper, or alternatively be on board with the renter. In most locations, daily insurance covering all risks is provided through the company's partnership with Allianz.

== Awards ==
In 2016, the startup was included in Frenchweb's FW500 ranking, featuring the top 500 French digital companies. The French newspaper L'Express ranked Click&Boat as one of its top 200 startups for the same year.
