= Virginia Women's Monument =

State memorial in Richmond, Virginia commemorating the contributions of Virginia women

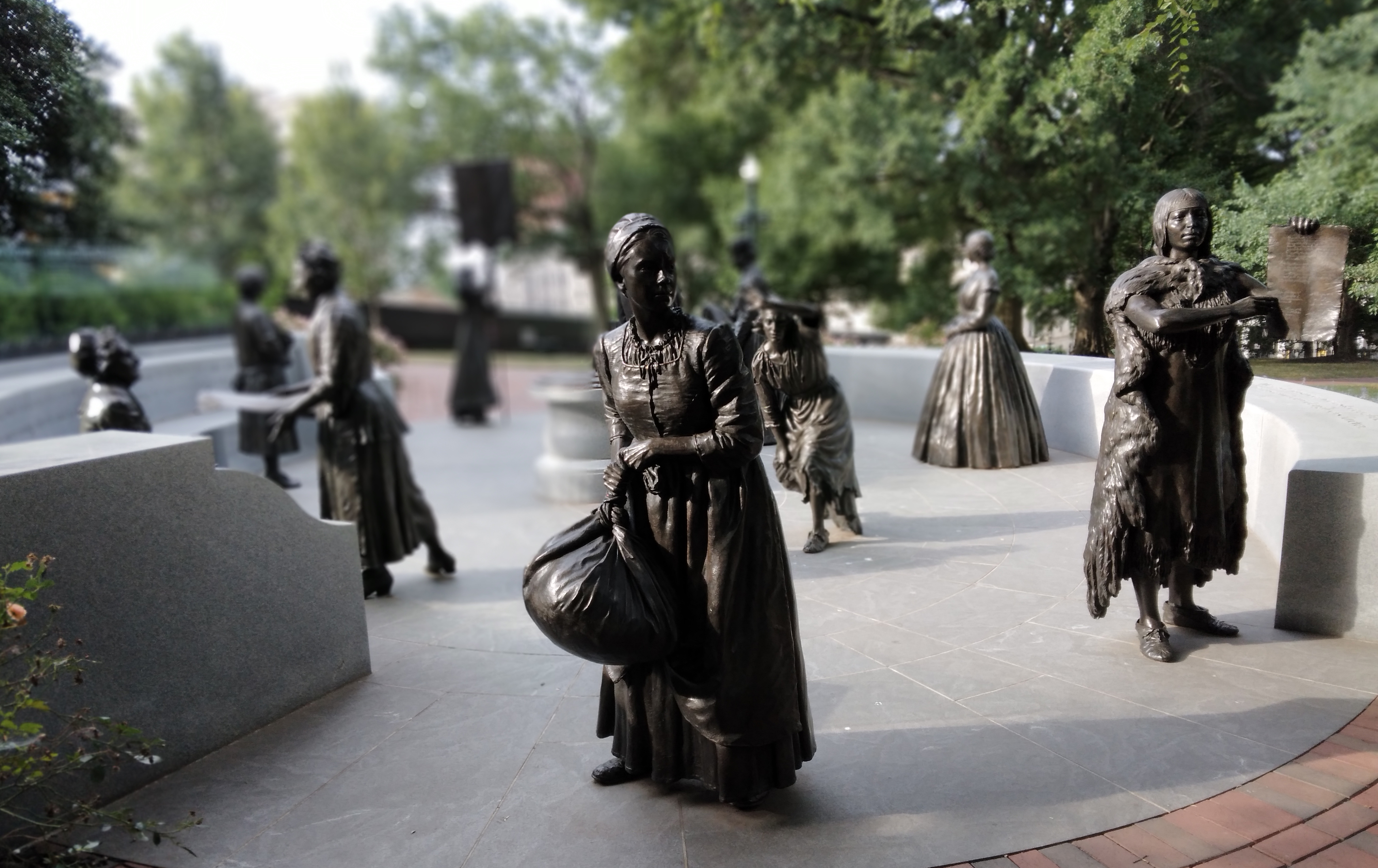
- Interactive map of Virginia Women's Monument
- Location: 1000 Bank St, Richmond, VA 23219
- Coordinates: 37°32′22″N 77°26′4″W
- Material: Granite, bronze, glass
- Opening date: October 14, 2019
- Dedicated to: Contributions of women throughout Virginia history
- Official website

The Virginia Women's Monument is a state memorial in Richmond, Virginia commemorating the contributions of Virginia women to the history of the Commonwealth of Virginia and the United States of America. Located on the grounds of the Virginia State Capitol, the monument is officially titled Voices from the Garden: The Virginia Women's Monument and features life-sized bronze statues of eleven Virginia women placed in a small granite plaza.

The monument was first proposed in 2009 and established by joint resolution of the Virginia General Assembly in 2010. An 18-member commission, along with input from the Library of Virginia and professors of women's history, selected the women to be honored with statues sculpted by StudioEIS in Brooklyn, New York. The granite plaza and Wall of Honor were opened in October 2018 and the monument was officially unveiled with the first seven completed statues on October 14, 2019.

The seven women were Cockacoeske, chieftain of the Pamunkey tribe; Anne Burras Laydon, Jamestown colonist; Mary Draper Ingles, frontierswoman and American pioneer; Elizabeth Keckley, seamstress and confidant of Mary Todd Lincoln; Laura Copenhaver, entrepreneur; Virginia Randolph, prominent educator; Adele Goodman Clark, suffragist and activist.

In May 2022 additional statues of Sarah Garland Boyd Jones, physician; Maggie L. Walker, businesswoman and teacher; Clementina Rind, the first female newspaper printer and publisher in Virginia; and Martha Washington, inaugural first lady of the United States, were installed.

== History ==
=== Proposal ===
The idea for the monument came in 2009 from Richmond native Em Bowles Locker Alsop — a writer and former actress who had been considered for the role of Scarlett O'Hara in the 1939 film Gone with the Wind. Alsop lobbied her state senator, Walter Stosch, who subsequently introduced Senate Joint Resolution No. 11 in the 2010 session of the Virginia General Assembly. The joint resolution, which created the Virginia Women's Monument Commission, was passed unanimously in both the Virginia House of Delegates and Senate of Virginia. In 2015, Alsop died at the age of 98, three years before the monument was first opened to the public.

From the text of Senate Joint Resolution No. 11:

WHEREAS, throughout the ages women have been central to the perpetuation of society, and women of every nationality and race have left an indelible mark through their countless contributions, achievements, and accomplishments that have benefitted mankind; and

WHEREAS, from the founding of the Commonwealth, the genius and creativity of women and their presence and contributions have been evident in every aspect of Virginia history and the life of the people of the Commonwealth; however, they have received little appreciation, recognition, or official acknowledgement...

RESOLVED by the Senate, the House of Delegates concurring, That a commemorative commission to honor the contributions of the women of Virginia with a monument on the grounds of Capitol Square be established.

The joint resolution established that the Virginia Women's Monument Commission would be composed of 19 members—the Governor, the Chair of the Senate Committee on Rules, the Speaker of the House of Delegates, representatives from the Senate and House, the Clerk of the House, and eight members of the general public. The resolution also established that the monument would be built with private funds.

== Design ==
The monument was planned to have a total of 12 statues, chosen from every region of the state and representing the diverse achievements of women throughout the first 400 years of Virginia's history. Standing in the center of the plaza is a granite pedestal topped by a bronze sundial engraved with the names of several Virginia localities. Two benches line the sides of the oval plaza, along with a series of tempered glass panels, called the Wall of Honor, inscribed with the names of more than 200 additional important women of Virginia history.

By the time the statues of Sarah Garland Boyd Jones and Maggie L. Walker were installed in 2022, the press referred to a total of 11 figures. Included in the original plan but missing from the final design was Sally Louisa Tompkins a Richmond hospital administrator and a captain in the Confederate army.

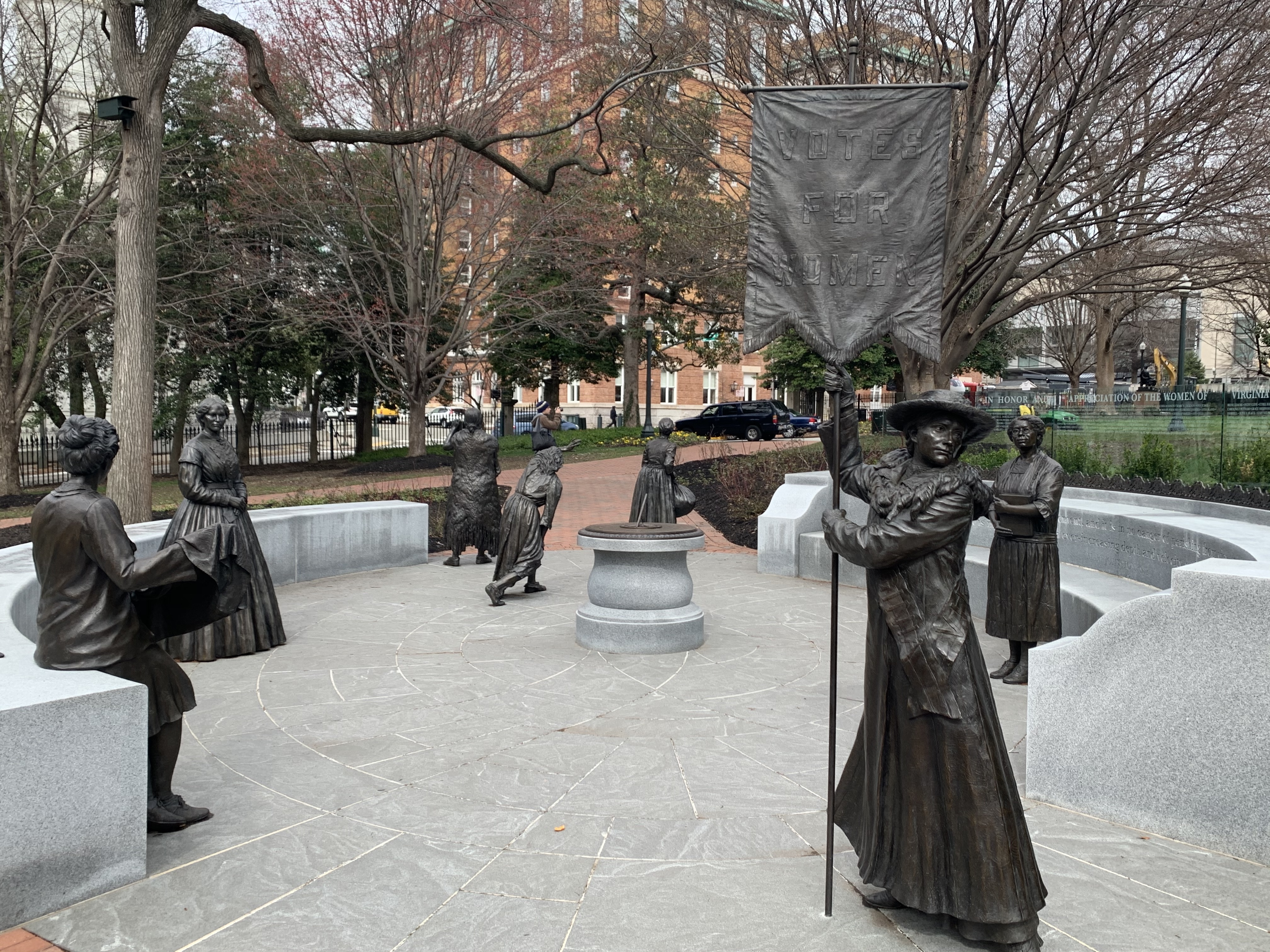
Early plan for the Virginia Women's Monument.

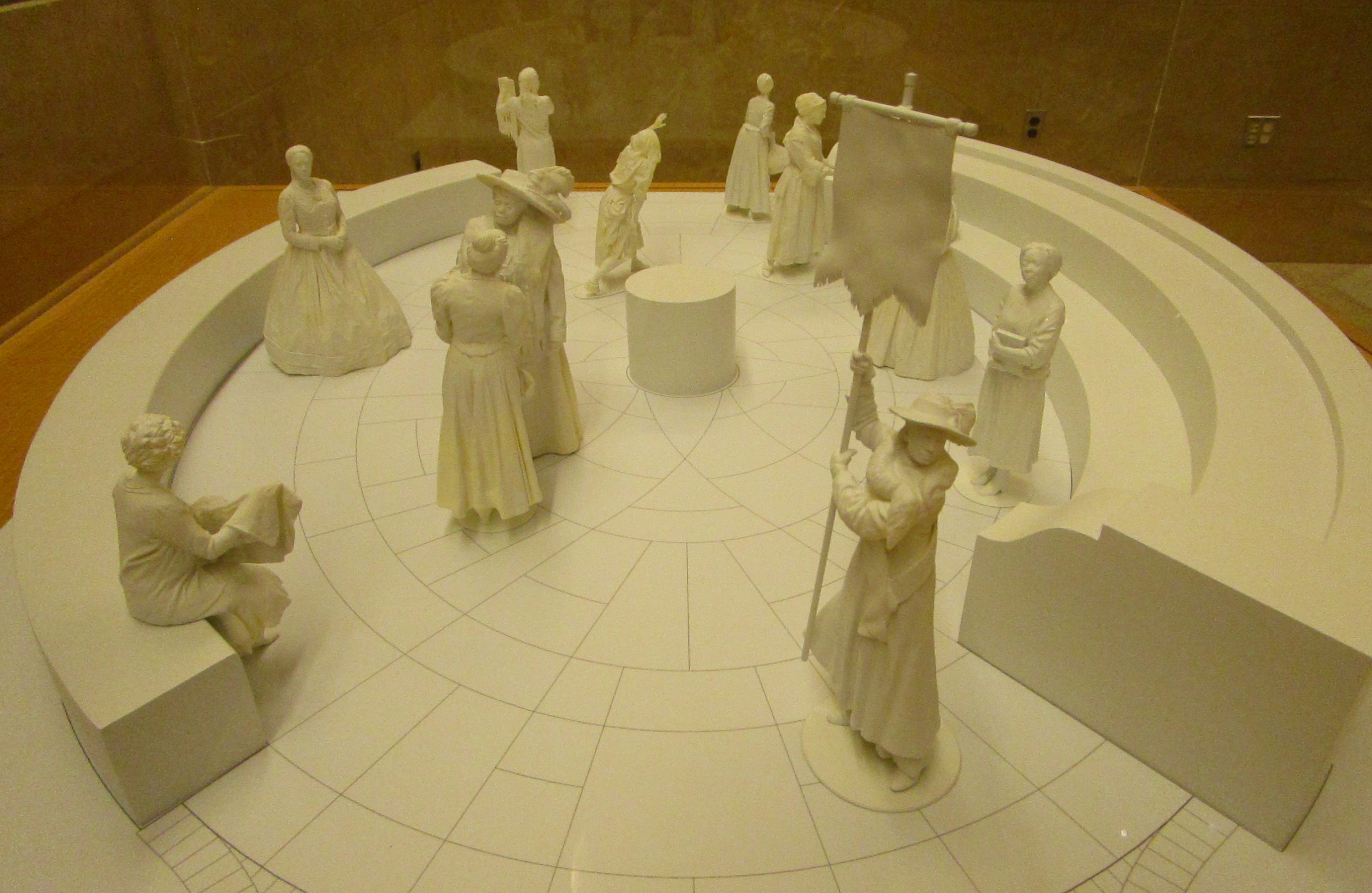
Model for completed monument

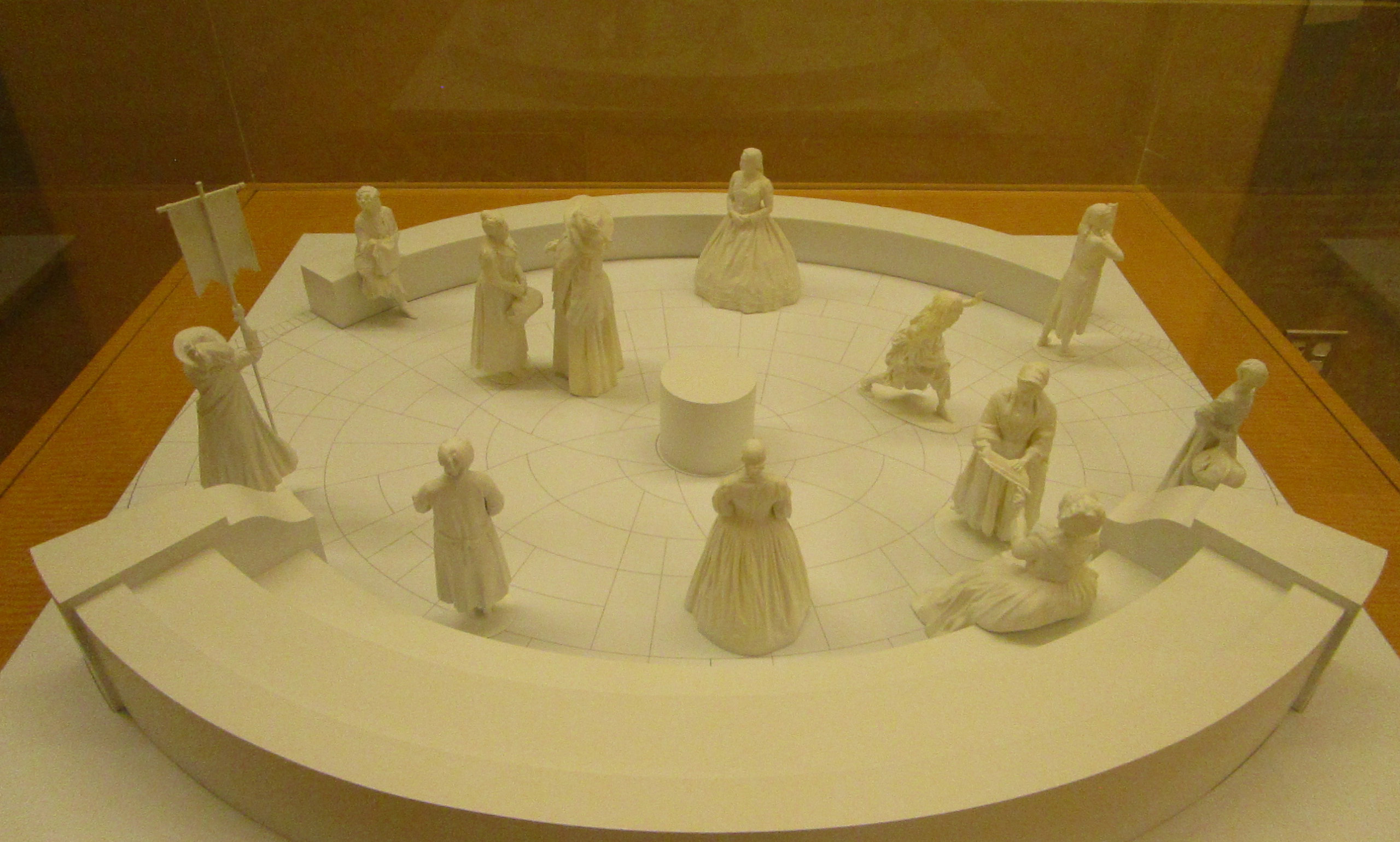
Model for completed monument

== Statues ==
=== Current monument ===
Honoree	Picture	Lived	Region	Description
Anne Burras Laydon		before c. 1594 – after 1625	Jamestown	Colonist
Cockacoeske		fl. 1656–1686	Middle Peninsula	Pamunkey chief
Mary Draper Ingles		1732–1815	New River Valley	Frontierswoman
Martha Washington		1731—1802	Chestnut Grove	Inaugural first lady of the United States
Clementina Rind		1740–1774	Williamsburg	Newspaper printer and publisher
Elizabeth Keckley		1818–1907	Dinwiddie County	Seamstress and author
Maggie L. Walker		1864–1934	Richmond	Businesswoman and teacher
Sarah Garland Boyd Jones		1866–1905	Richmond	Physician
Laura E. Copenhaver		1868–1940	Smyth County	Entrepreneur and Lutheran lay leader
Virginia E. Randolph		1870–1958	Henrico County	Educator
Adèle Clark		1882–1983	Richmond	Suffragist and artist

== Wall of Honor ==
A further 230 women are listed on the Wall of Honor of the Monument; further nominations are currently being solicited.

=== List of honorees ===
- Em Bowles Locker Alsop
- Pocahontas (Matoaka)
- Pauline Adams
- Mollie Adams
- Lucy Addison
- Mary Aggie
- Ella Graham Agnew
- Mary C. Alexander
- Sharifa Alkhateeb
- Susie M. Ames
- Eleanor Copenhaver Anderson
- V. C. Andrews
- Orie Moon Andrews
- Ann (Pamunkey chief)
- Grace Arents
- Nancy Astor
- Addie D. Atkinson
- Anne Bailey
- Odessa Pittard Bailey
- Mary Julia Baldwin
- Lucy Barbour
- Hazel K. Barger
- Janie Porter Barrett
- Kate Waller Barrett
- M. Majella Berg
- Frances Berkeley
- Ann Bignall
- Aline E. Black
- Mary Blackford
- Catherine Blaikley
- Florence A. Blanchfield
- Anna Bland
- Cynthia Boatwright
- Elisabeth S. Bocock
- Anna W. Bodeker
- Carrie J. Bolden
- Mary Marshall Bolling
- Matilda M. Booker
- Gladys Boone
- Dorothy Rouse Bottom
- Geline MacDonald Bowman
- Mary Richards Bowser
- Rosa D. Bowser
- Belle Boyd
- Sarah Patton Boyle
- Mildred Bradshaw
- Lucy Goode Brooks
- Belle S. Bryan
- Mary E. Brydon
- Annabel Morris Buchanan
- Dorothea D. Buck
- Pattie Buford
- Evelyn T. Butts
- Mary Willing Byrd
- Sadie Heath Cabaniss
- Mary Virginia Ellet Cabell
- Willie Walker Caldwell
- Edith Lindeman Calisch
- Christiana Campbell
- Elizabeth Pfohl Campbell
- Eliza J. Carrington
- Maybelle Carter
- Sara Carter
- Virginia Cary
- Ruth Harvey Charity
- Jean Outland Chrysler
- Patsy Cline
- Matty L. Cocke
- Sarah Johnson Cocke
- Naomi Silverman Cohn
- Cynthia B. T. Coleman
- Edna M. Colson
- Esther I. Cooper
- Hannah Lee Corbin
- Ann Cotton
- Lucy Ann Cox
- Daphne Dailey
- Margaret Dashiell
- Jo Ann Davis
- Grace E. Davis
- Jennie Dean
- Helen Dewar
- Emily W. Dinwiddie
- Claudia Lane Dodson
- Bertha L. Douglass
- M. Estelle Eley
- Virginia Randolph Ellett
- Margaret Erskine
- Lettie Pate Whitehead Evans
- Sarah Lee Fain
- Lillie Fearnow
- Rachel Findlay
- Edith Fitzgerald
- Ella Fitzgerald
- Eve D. Fout
- Ethel Bailey Furman
- Elizabeth Furness
- Mary Jeffery Galt
- Charlotte C. Giesen
- Ellen Glasgow
- Meta Glass
- Thelma Young Gordon
- Nancy Hale
- India Hamilton
- Dorothy Hamm
- Marion Harland
- Laura Jane Harper
- Jean Harris
- Orie Latham Hatcher
- Della I. Hayden
- Mary Rice Hayes-Allen
- Sally Hemings
- Rachel Henderlite
- Helen T. Henderson
- Susanne Hirt
- Anne Makemie Holden
- Judith Hope
- Grace Hopper
- Nora Houston
- Mary W. Jackson
- Annabella R. Jenkins
- Kate Jeter
- Florence Jodzies
- Barbara Johns
- Julia Johns
- Mary Johnston
- Mary Johnston-Brittain
- Georgeanna Jones
- Thomasina E. Jordan
- Ona Judge
- May L. Keller
- Emma V. Kelley
- Christine Herter Kendall
- Lucille Chaffin Kent
- Elizabeth Key
- Ellen G. Kidd
- Alice Kyle
- Henrietta Lacks
- Anna Maria Lane
- Orra Henderson Moore Gray Langhorne
- Irene Leache
- Edna Lewis
- Elizabeth D. Lewis
- Matilda Lindsay
- Judith Lomax
- Rebecca Lovenstein
- Louise O'Connor Lucas
- Mary Tyler Cheek McClenahan
- Dorothy S. McDiarmid
- Sarah Madden
- Dolley Madison
- Pauline F. Maloney
- Miriam D. Mann
- Bessie N. Marshall
- Lucy Randolph Mason
- Vivian Carter Mason
- Amaza Lee Meredith
- Alice duPont Mills
- Jane Minor
- Nannie J. Minor
- Lottie Moon
- Undine Smith Moore
- Georgia Weston Morgan
- Irene Morgan
- Mary-Cooke Branch Munford
- Elizabeth Nottingham
- Opossunoquonuske
- Elizabeth L. Otey
- Mary Morton Parsons
- Nina K. Peace
- Mary Peake
- Rebekah Peterkin
- Marian Poe
- Theresa Pollak
- Amelia E. P. Pride
- Orleana Puckett
- Caroline F. Putnam
- Mary Randolph
- Jessie M. Rattley
- Eudora Ramsay Richardson
- Isabel Rogers
- Wané Roonseraw
- Dorothy Roy
- Elizabeth Russell
- Nellie Pratt Russell
- Marion duPont Scott
- Mary Wingfield Scott
- Eleanor P. Sheppard
- Grace Sherwood
- Catherine Filene Shouse
- Henrietta Shuck
- Jean Skipwith
- Isabel Dodge Sloane
- Louise J. Smith
- Anne Spencer
- Elizabeth Allen Smith
- Annie Snyder
- Ora B. Stokes
- Kathryn H. Stone
- Queena Stovall
- Mary C. Stowers
- Alice Jackson Stuart
- Kate Peters Sturgill
- Evelyn Reid Syphax
- Elizabeth N. Tompkins
- Amélie Rives Troubetzkoy
- Lucile Barrow Turner
- Lila Meade Valentine
- Elizabeth Van Lew
- Mary B. Wade
- Mabel Lee Walton
- Melissa Warfield
- Laura Martin Wheelwright
- Edith Bolling Wilson
- Jean Wood
- Helen Wood
- Temperance Flowerdew Yeardley
- Martha Anne Woodrum Zillhardt
