= List of first women lawyers and judges in Virginia =

This is a list of the first women lawyer(s) and judge(s) in Virginia. It includes the year in which the women were admitted to practice law (in parentheses). Also included are women who achieved other distinctions such becoming the first in their state to graduate from law school or become a political figure.

== Firsts in state history ==
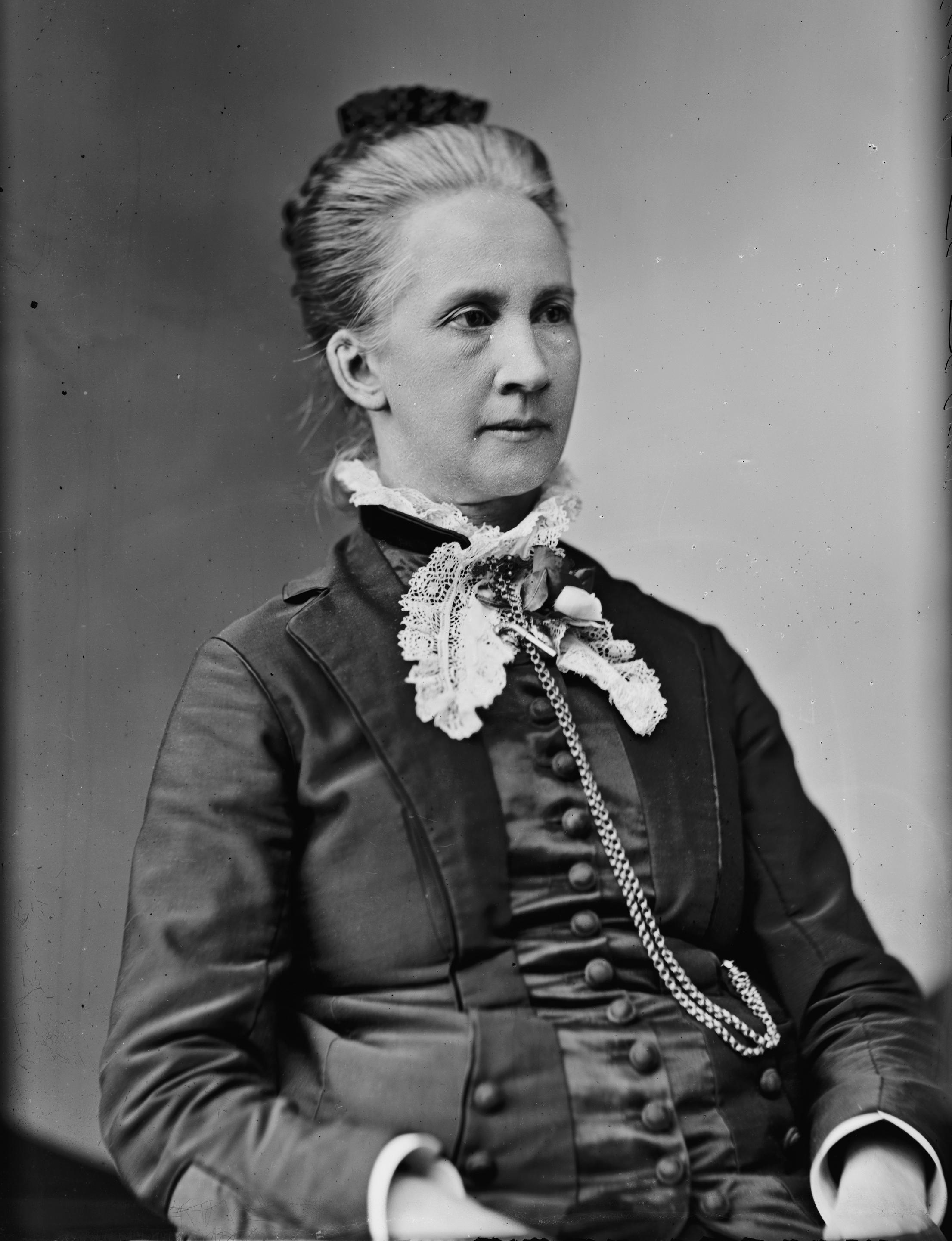
Belva Ann Lockwood: First female lawyer to practice before the Virginia federal court (1879)

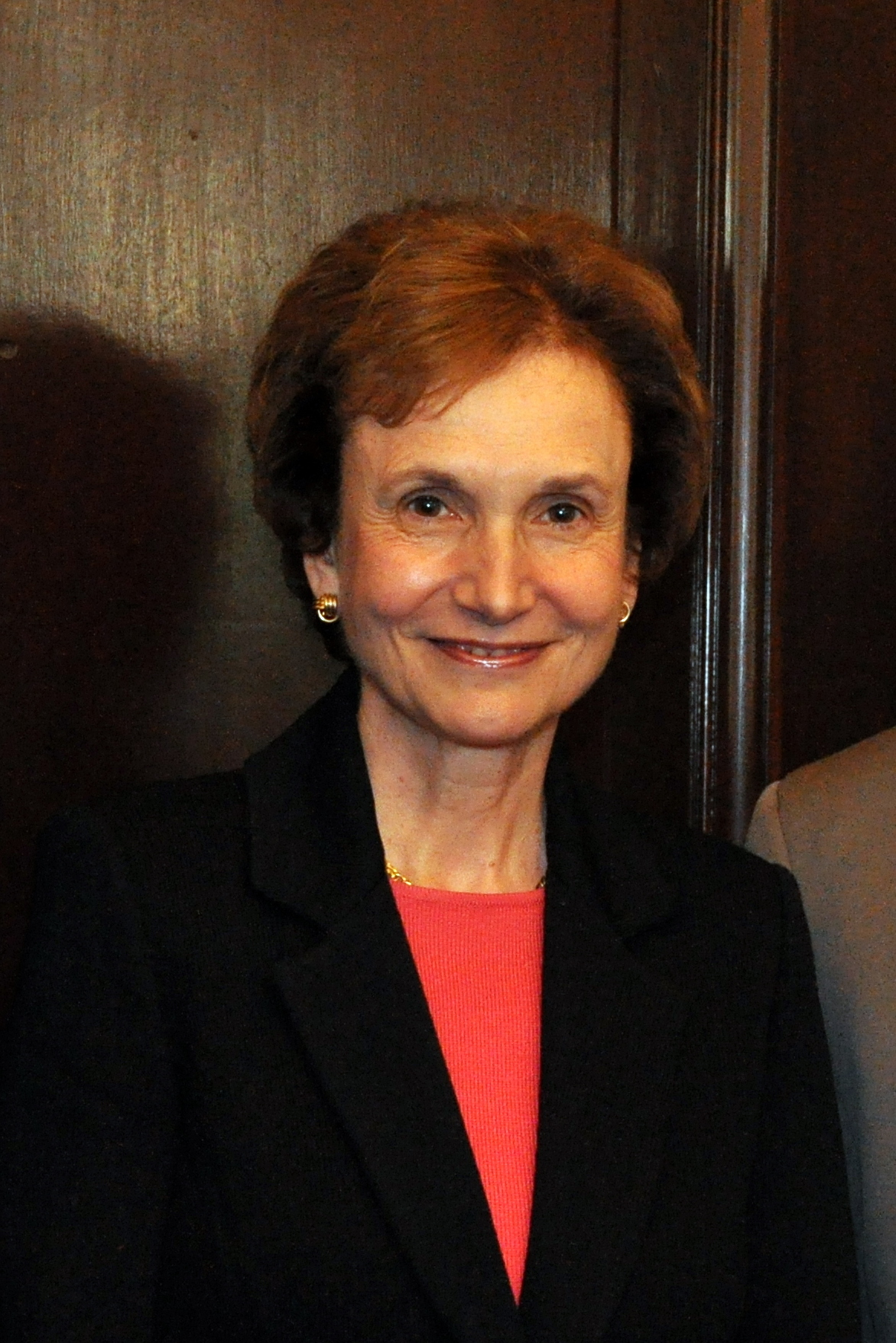
Barbara Milano Keenan: First female Judge of the U.S. Court of Appeals for the Fourth Circuit

=== Law school ===
- First female law graduates: Elizabeth N. Tompkins and Jane Brown Ranson in 1923

=== Lawyers ===
- First female to practice before state's federal court: Belva Ann Lockwood in 1879
- First females licensed: Rebecca Pearl Lovenstein and Carrie M. Gregory (1920)
- First female to practice before the Virginia Supreme Court: Mildred Callahan in 1923
- First African American female: Lavinia Marian Fleming Poe (1925)
- First African American female (full-time government attorney): Alda White
- First African American female (major law firm partner): Jacquelyn Stone in 1994

=== State judges ===
- First female: Mary Kerr Moorehead Harris in 1922
- First female (Juvenile and Domestic Relations Court): Odessa Pittard Bailey in 1944
- First female (county court): Anna Fancher Hedrick (1930) in 1951
- First female (Virginia Supreme Court): Elizabeth B. Lacy in 1989
- First African American female: Angela Roberts in 1990
- First African American female (First Judicial Circuit): Eileen A. Olds (1982) in 1995
- First female (Twenty-Fifth Judicial District): Virginia Anita Filson in 2001
- First Hispanic American (female): Uley Norris Damiani in 2009
- First African American female (Virginia Supreme Court): Cleo Powell (1982) in 2011
- First female (Chief Justice; Virginia Supreme Court): Cynthia D. Kinser in 2011
- First Asian American female: Maha-Rebekah Abejuela in 2019
- First Sri-Lankan American female: Divani Nadaraja in 2023
- First Muslim American (female who is of Arab descent): Razan J. Fayez in 2024

=== Federal judges ===
- First African American female (U.S. Court of Appeals for the Fourth Circuit): Allyson Kay Duncan (1975) in 2003
- First African American female (U.S. District Court for the Eastern District of Virginia): Arenda Wright Allen (1985) in 2011
- Firs female chief judge (U.S. Bankruptcy Court for the Western District of Virginia): Rebecca B. Connelly (1963) in 2012
- First female (U.S. District Court for the Western District of Virginia): Elizabeth K. Dillon (1986) in 2014
- First Asian American (female) (U.S. District Court for the Western District of Virginia): Jasmine H. Yoon in 2024
- First African American (female) (U.S. Bankruptcy Court for the Eastern District of Virginia): Klinette H. Kindred (1970) in 2017
- First female (U.S. Court of Appeals for the Fourth Circuit): Barbara Milano Keenan (1991)

=== Attorney General of Virginia ===
- First female: Mary Sue Terry (1973) from 1986-1993

=== Assistant Attorney General of Virginia ===
- First female: Sallie T. Warthen c. 1971

=== Deputy Attorney General ===
- First female: Elizabeth B. Lacy in 1982

=== United States Attorney ===
- First female: Elsie Munsell in 1981

=== Commonwealth's Attorney ===
- First African American female: Gammiel Poindexter in 1975

=== Virginia Bar Association ===
- First female (presidents): Anita Poston and Jeanne Franklin respectively from 2000-2001 and 2001-2002
- First African American (female): Doris Henderson Causey in 2017
- First Latino American female: Stephanie E. Grana in 2022

== Firsts in local history ==
- Eleanor Dobson (1974): First female judge in Arlington County, Virginia (1982)
- Judith Wheat: First female to serve as the Chief Judge of the Arlington County Circuit Court (2023)
- Elaine Jones: First African American female to attend and graduate from the University of Virginia School of Law (1970)
- Reece Hale Robertson: First female circuit judge in Buchanan County, Virginia (2024)
- Gammiel Poindexter: First African American (female) judge in the Sixth Judicial District (Brunswick County, et al.; 1995)
- Tania M.L. Saylor: First female of color to serve as a Judge of the Fairfax County Circuity Court (2022)
- Lee Lovett (1947): First female lawyer in Winchester, Virginia, Frederick County, Virginia
- Helivi Holland: First African American female to serve as a General District judge in the 5th Judicial District. In 2024, she became the first (African American) female to serve on the 5th Judicial Circuit Court. She was also the first African American (female) to serve as the Suffolk City Attorney. [Isle of Wight, Southampton and Suffolk Counties, Virginia]
- Buta Biberaj: First (Albanian American, Muslim, and immigrant) female to serve as the Commonwealth’s Attorney for Loudoun County, Virginia (2019)
- Lorrie A. Sinclair Taylor: First African American (female) judge in Loudoun County, Virginia (2020)
- Bertha Douglass (1926): First (African American) female lawyer in Norfolk, Virginia
- Stephanie Morales: First female elected as the Commonwealth's Attorney for Portsmouth, Virginia (2015)
- Janice Wellington: First female (and African American) judge in Prince William County, Virginia (1990)
- Phoebe Hall: First female to serve as the Public Defender for Richmond, Virginia
- Rachel Figura: First female judge for the City of Harrisonburg and Rockingham County, Virginia (2019)
- Kimberly M. Jenkins: First female judge for the 30th Judicial Circuit Juvenile & Domestic Relations Court, from Scott County, Virginia (2019)
- Alda White: First female (and African American female) to serve as the County Attorney for Stafford County, Virginia
- Suzanne Kuzco Fulton: First female to serve as General District Court Judge for Wise County and the 30th Judicial Circuit (1989-2005)

== See also ==
- List of first women lawyers and judges in the United States
- Timeline of women lawyers in the United States
- Women in law

== Other topics of interest ==
- List of first minority male lawyers and judges in the United States
- List of first minority male lawyers and judges in Virginia
