= Clementina Rind =

American journalist

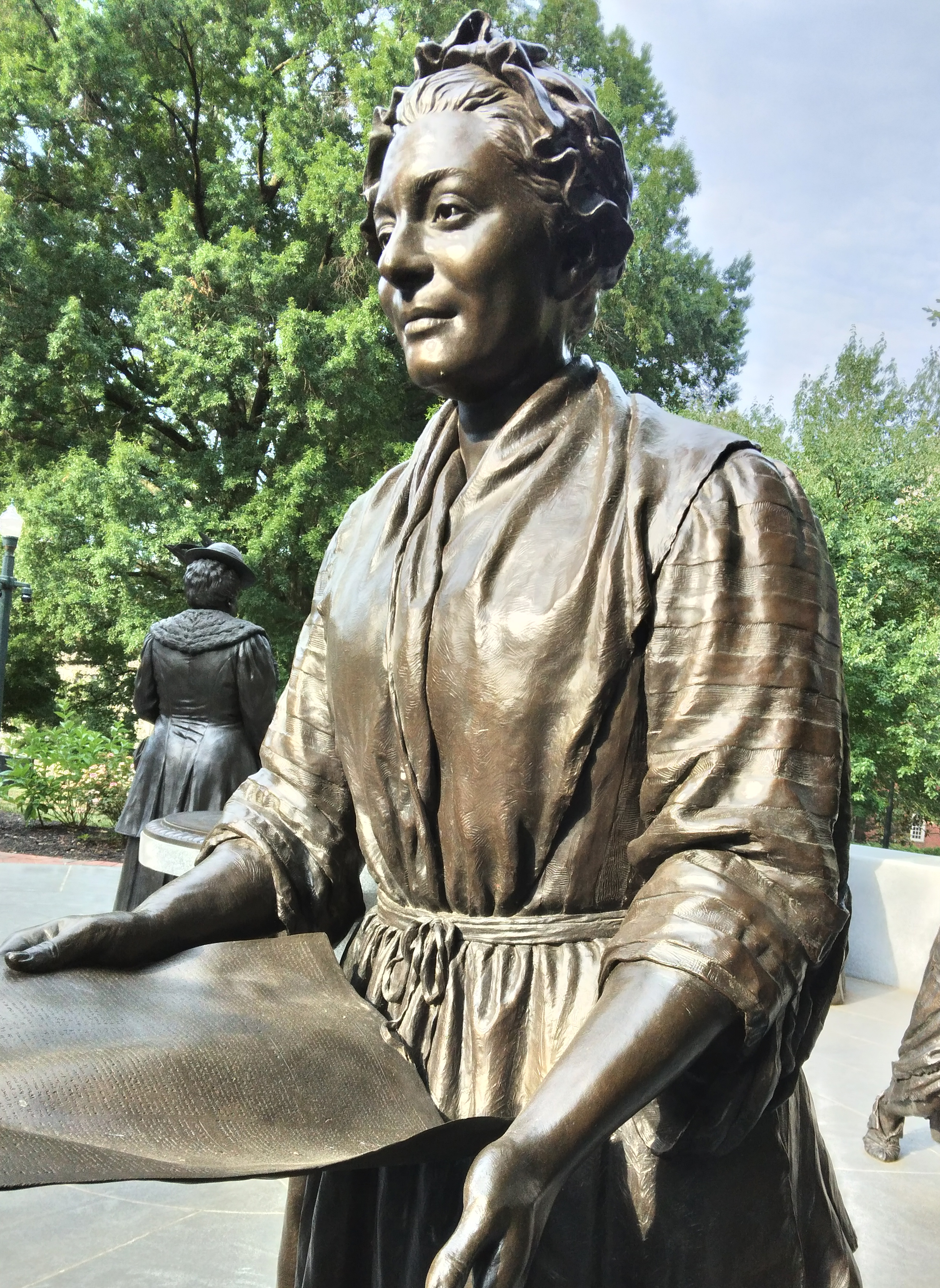
- statue of Clementina Rind at the Virginia Women's Monument
- Born: ca. 1740; Maryland?
- Died: September 25, 1774; Williamsburg, Virginia
- Occupation: Printer
- Known for: First female newspaper printer and publisher in Virginia.
- Spouse: William Rind

Clementina Rind (c. 1740–September 25, 1774) was a Colonial American woman who is known as being the first female newspaper printer and publisher in Virginia. Living and working in Williamsburg, Virginia, she took the printing press established by her husband, William Rind, after his death in 1773. Clementina continued to print The Virginia Gazette and also published Thomas Jefferson's tract A Summary View of the Rights of British America.

== Early years ==
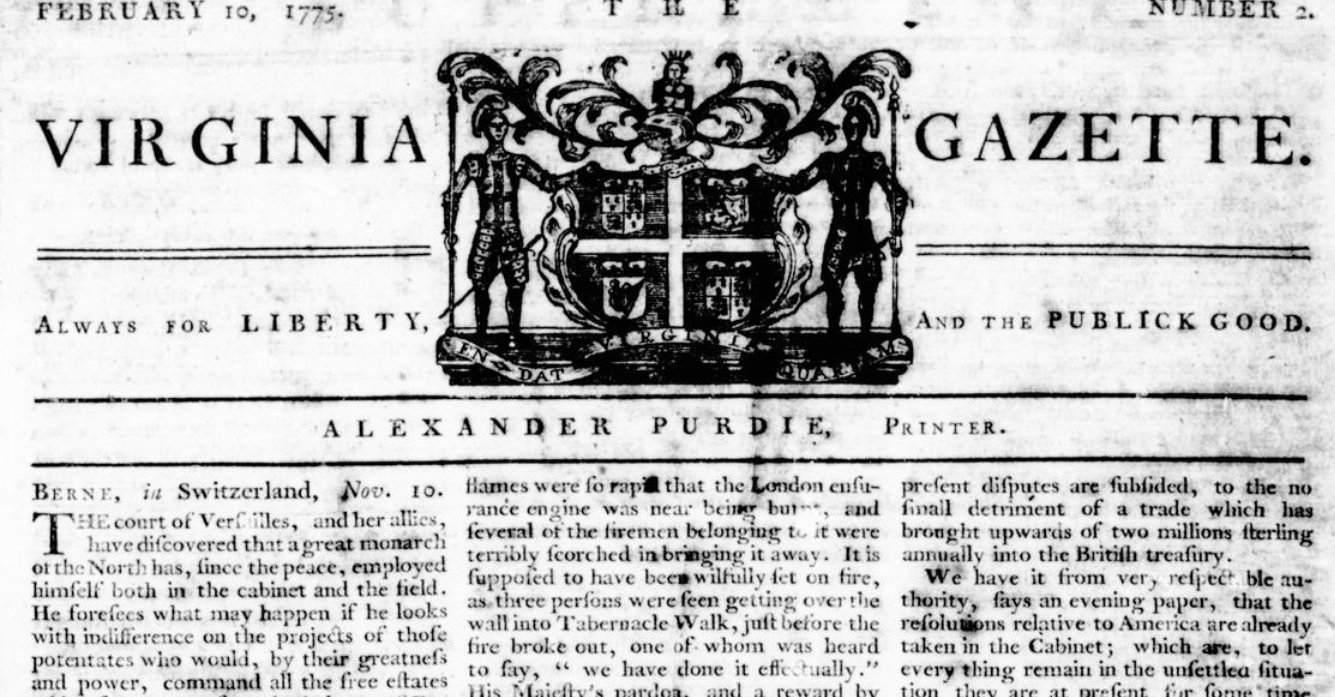
The Virginia Gazette February 10, 1775

Little is known about Clementina's early life. She was born around 1740, possibly in Maryland. Sometime between 1762 and 1765, she married William Rind (1733-1773), a printer in Maryland who worked in partnership with Annapolis printer, Jonas Green on the Maryland Gazette. William Rind and Jonas Green worked together until publication of The Maryland Gazette was suspended in October 1765 as a protest to the Stamp Act of 1765. Afterwards, the Rinds moved to Williamsburg sometime between late 1765 and early 1766 in response to an invitation William Rind had received to start The Virginia Gazette. On May 16, 1766, the first issue of William Rind's The Virginia Gazette was printed, accompanied with the motto, "Open to ALL PARTIES, but Influenced by NONE." Within this newspaper, William Rind printed local publications advertisements as well as information from the Virginia House of Burgesses (laws, resolutions, proclamations, and journals), a practice Clementina Rind would later continue. As the printing press flourished, so too did their lives in Williamsburg. By 1767, they were living on the Duke of Gloucester Street, in a brick building that served as both a work space and a family residence. Together, Clementina and William Rind, built a life and family consisting of five children (one daughter and four sons) all of whom were born in Williamsburg, with the exception of the eldest who was born in Maryland.

== Printing career ==
Following the death of her husband in August 1773, Clementina Rind edited and published The Virginia Gazette until 1774. She managed the press out of her brick home, now the Ludwell–Paradise House in Colonial Williamsburg. Rind printed submissions from female readers, giving the newspaper a strong female point of view. In 1774, Rind was the first to print Thomas Jefferson's A Summary View of the Rights of British America.

Rind became ill in August 1774 and died the following month in Williamsburg. She had five children: William, John, Charles, James, and Maria. She was honored as part of the first class of Virginia Women in History in 2000.

== See also ==
- List of women printers and publishers before 1800
