= Ann Cotton (disambiguation) =

Ann Cotton may refer to:

- Ann Cotton (born 1950) is a Welsh philanthropist and entrepreneur.
- Ann Cotton (colonial Virginian) (fl. 1650s–1670s)

== See also ==
- Ann Cotten (born 1982), American-born German writer
- Annie Cotton (born 1975), Canadian actress and singer
- Mary Ann Cotton (1832–1873), British serial killer
