= Amelia Perry Pride =

American educator (1857–1932)

- Born: Amelia Elizabeth Perry; 1857
- Died: 1932 (aged 74–75)
- Occupations: educator, institution founder

Amelia Perry Pride (1857–1932) was an American educator who established a home for aged impoverished former slaves.

== Biography ==
Pride was born in 1857. She attended Hampton Institute. Pride was one of the first Black teachers in the Lynchburg Public School system. Her career spanned 33 years and for 20 years she served as principal of the Polk Street Elementary School in Lynchburg. Pride was influential in bringing cooking and sewing classes into the school curriculum. In the 1940s a separate building was constructed at Dunbar High School for home economics. It was named The Amelia Pride Homemaking Cottage.

In 1897 Pride organized the Dorchester Home an old-age home for former enslaved women. Pride died in 1932.

Perry is included in the reference book Notable Black American Women. In 2018 the Virginia Capitol Foundation announced that Pride's name would be in the Virginia Women's Monument's glass Wall of Honor.
