= Nannie Jacquelin Minor =

American public health nurse (1871–1934)

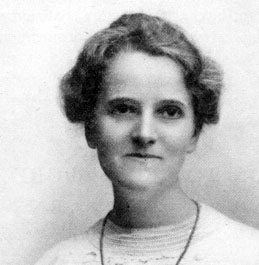
- Born: Anne Jacquelin Minor; June 15, 1871; Charlottesville, Virginia, U.S.
- Died: January 30, 1934 (aged 53); Lewisburg, West Virginia, U.S.
- Education: Old Dominion Hospital Training School

Nannie Jacquelin Minor (1871–1934) was an early practitioner of public health nursing in the U.S. state of Virginia. She was a founding member of the Nurses Settlement in Richmond, Virginia.

== Biography ==
Minor was born on June 15, 1871, in Charlottesville, Virginia. She attended the Old Dominion Hospital Training School, graduating in 1900. She pursued further study at Johns Hopkins Hospital and Thomas Wilson Sanatorium. At the turn of the century she worked with Sadie Heath Cabaniss to establish the Nurses Settlement. The two women worked with Sarah Harvie Wormeley to expand the Nurses Settlement into the Instructive Visiting Nurse Association (IVNA). Minor worked at INVA until 1922 when she became the director of Public Health Nursing in the Bureau of Child Welfare with the Virginia State Health Department.

During her career she was member of the Virginia State Association of Nurses and was appointed to the first Virginia State Board of Examiners of Nurses where she served for ten years.

Minor died on January 30, 1934, in Lewisburg, West Virginia.

In 2018 the Virginia Capitol Foundation announced that Minor's name would be on the Virginia Women's Monument's glass Wall of Honor.
