= Annabella Ravenscroft Gibson Jenkins =

American nurse

- Born: July 13, 1827
- Died: December 13, 1901 (aged 74)
- Occupations: nurse, hospital administrator

Annabella Ravenscroft Gibson Jenkins (July 13, 1827 – December 13, 1901) was an American Civil War era nurse who founded the Retreat for the Sick hospital in Richmond, Virginia.

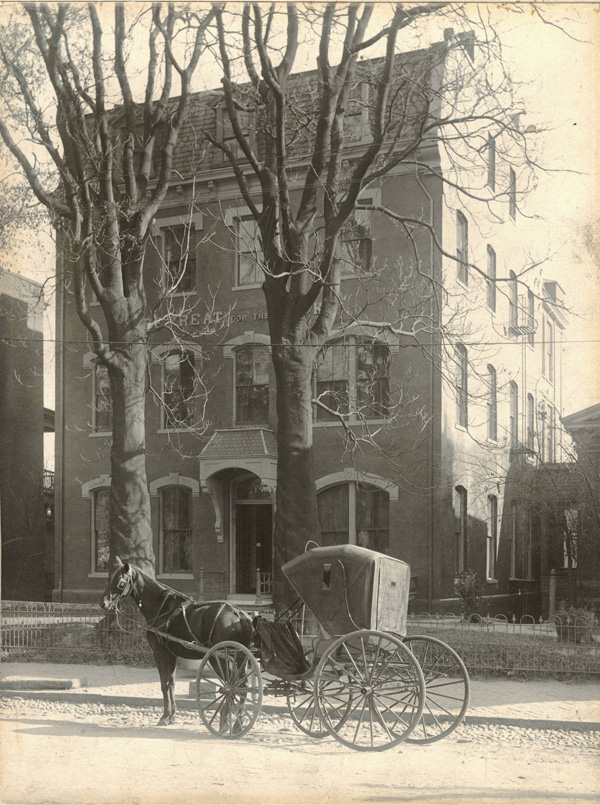
Original Retreat Hospital, Richmond, Va., then known as the Retreat for the Sick

== Biography ==
Jenkins was born on July 13, 1827. She was a self-taught nurse. During the Civil War she cared for Confederate soldiers. After the war, in 1877, she organized a hospital in Richmond, Virginia to care for the city's poor residents of all races and genders. The building was provided by the Medical College of Virginia and was originally named the Retreat for the Sick, then the Retreat Hospital. After five years the hospital was moved to North 12th Street, then again to Grove Avenue in 1921.

Jenkins died on December 13, 1901.

In 1995 of the Jenkins Foundation was formed with the mission to improve the health of the community. In 2018 the Virginia Capitol Foundation announced that Jenkins' name would be on the Virginia Women's Monument's glass Wall of Honor.
