= Ellen Kidd =

American suffragist and businesswoman, creator of Pin Money Pickles

Ellen Gertrude Tompkins Kidd
- Born: circa 1852; Richmond, Virginia, US
- Died: February 4, 1932 (aged 79); Richmond, Virginia, US
- Other names: E. G. Kidd
- Known for: Pin-Money Pickles

Ellen Gertrude Tompkins Kidd (c. 1852 – February 4, 1932) was an American suffragist and businesswoman known for being the creator of Pin Money Pickles.

== Biography ==
Ellen Kidd was born in Richmond, Virginia, the daughter of Edmund William Tompkins and Julia Mosby Burton Tompkins. She went to the Pegram School for Girls operated by Mary E. Pegram. On April 4, 1872, Tompkins married John Boulware Kidd, an unsuccessful grocer and widower who had previously been married to her sister. The couple raised the four children from his earlier marriage and had two daughters and seven sons, four of whom survived to adulthood. Her husband died in 1910. She died on February 4, 1932.

Kidd began making pickles at her home in Richmond, Virginia in 1868 when she was sixteen years old, using her grandmother's recipe. People would offer her money, colloquially known as "pin money" which was money women would earn for domestic pursuits, or small amounts of money given to them by their husbands. Her pickles won multiple blue ribbons at the Virginia State Fair, but sweet pickles were not as popular outside of the South. They eventually became well known and orders came in from across the United States. After she got married, her husband joined her in the family business. She expanded her pickle business (an early client was the Pullman Company), eventually running a pickle-processing plant that produced 1000 barrels a day by 1919. By 1926, Pin Money Pickles was an international company that doing half a million dollars' worth of business. Most of the vegetables that went into her pickles were produced locally and in 1929 it was said that Pin Money Pickles were supporting 150 local farms.

Kidd traveled throughout the United States and Europe marketing her product, working to not just sell to business but also to restaurants, with many high-end restaurants carrying her pickles. The pickles sold in stores would then advertise that they were served in prestigious restaurants. They were described as being "made from very small cucumbers which are covered with sharp points like a baby porcupine."

Kidd was one of Richmond's wealthiest businesspeople, reinvesting her profits in local real estate, and the first female member of the Richmond Chamber of Commerce. She stopped being involved in active management of the company in the late 1920s, but remained its president until her death. The company continued to produce the pickles in Richmond, and exhibit at the state fair, until 1950 when the company was sold and shortly thereafter dissolved.

== Suffrage advocacy ==
Kidd was a firm believer in equal rights for women, serving as state treasurer of the Equal Suffrage League of Virginia and later was a charter member of the Virginia League of Women Voters which was founded in 1920. Virginia's General Assembly was one that did not ratify the 19th Amendment. Kidd attended the National League of Women Voters convention as part of the Virginia delegation in 1921.

Kidd belonged to the Richmond Business and Professional Women's Club, promoting the interests of business women. At the 1922 convention of the National Federation of Business and Professional Women's Clubs, Kidd made sure that Pin Money Pickles were served at the banquet and identified by name.

== Legacy ==
Her estate of over $300,000 was divided among members of her family and several local hospitals, orphanages, and other charitable institutions. Her papers are held by the Library of Virginia. In 2018 the Virginia Capitol Foundation announced that Kidd's name would be on the Virginia Women's Monument's glass Wall of Honor.
