= Lavinia Marian Fleming Poe =

American lawyer

- Born: Lavinia Marian Fleming; August 13, 1890
- Died: March 20, 1974 (aged 83)
- Education: Howard University
- Occupation: Attorney

Lavinia Marian Fleming Poe (1890–1974) was the first African American woman lawyer in Virginia, passing the bar exam in 1925.

== Biography ==
Born Lavinia Marian Fleming on August 13, 1890 in Warwick County, Virginia to Archer R. Fleming, a blacksmith and former slave, and Florence M. Carter. She primarily grew up in Newport News, Virginia. In 1910 she married Abram James Poe, becoming Lavinia Marian Fleming Poe. She was married and had two children when she decided to become a lawyer. Poe moved her family to Washington, D.C. where she worked as a bank teller and enrolled in Howard University Law School. She passed the Virginia bar in 1925, becoming the first African American woman to do so.

She returned to Newport News where she began a practice. In 1927 she gained the necessary credentials to argue in front of the Supreme Court of Appeals in Virginia. Her practice continued through the 1960s.

Poe was a member of the National Association of Women Lawyers and she served as secretary to the Old Dominion Bar Association for 13 years. She died on March 20, 1974.

In 2018 the Virginia Capitol Foundation announced that Poe's name would be included on the Virginia Women's Monument's glass Wall of Honor.

== See also ==
- List of first women lawyers and judges in Virginia
