= Willie Varner =

American football coach (1926–2009)

W. L. "Willie" Varner (May 22, 1926 – January 20, 2009) was a high school football coach. He coached for 42 seasons (1954–96) at Woodruff High School in Woodruff, South Carolina, amassing 383 victories, 10 state titles, and 28 conference titles. Coach Varner was given the Order of the Palmetto, the highest honor given to a South Carolina civilian, in 1996.

== Background ==
Varner was born in Gaffney, SC and attended Spartanburg High School. He played football and ran track for Wofford College. After graduation, he served a short stint in the Army before beginning his coaching career at Woodruff High School.

== At Woodruff High ==
In 42 years, he had a record of 383-133-10. His Woodruff teams won 10 state championships, 16 Upper State titles, and 28 conference crowns. The four state titles his teams won from 1975 to 1978 is a feat that only two other South Carolina schools have accomplished. His back to back title teams in 1983 and 1984 combined to finish a perfect 28–0 over their two championship seasons. He ranks second in the state of South Carolina and sixth in the Nation in wins. He is a member of the Wofford College Hall of Fame, WHS Hall of Fame, National High School Hall of Fame, S.C. Athletics Hall of Fame, and S.C. Coach's Association Hall of Fame. He was named the National High School Coach of the Year in 1983. Most recently after his death, he was inducted to the S.C. Athletic Director's Hall of Fame and the S.C. Football Coach's Hall of Fame. Among his prized players was Tony Rice, who quarterbacked state championships for Varner and also led Notre Dame to a national championship under Lou Holtz. He coached in the shrine bowl and in the north–south all star game, which he won twice.

== Other experience ==
Varner also won 4 state Championships in Girls basketball and 2 in baseball. Out of the 25 State Championships that Woodruff High School owns Varner is responsible for 16 of them. There was a Pepsi bottle made with Varner's face on it after he was named to the National High School Sports Hall of Fame. After he was forced to step down as the head coach in 1996, he remained active in the school as the assistant principal. On January 20, 2009 Varner died.

== Milestone Wins ==
No. 1 – Woodruff 7, Boiling Springs 0, 1954
No. 100 – Woodruff 40, Winnsboro 0, 1966
No. 200 – Woodruff 61, Blue Ridge 0, 1976
No. 250 - Woodruff 27, Lugoff-Elgin 0, 1980
No. 300 – Woodruff 35, Pendleton 7, 1985
No. 325 - Woodruff 13, Chesnee 7, 1989
No. 350 - Woodruff 25, Greer 17, 1992
No. 383 – Woodruff 14, Woodmont 6, 1996

== State championships ==
1956 – Woodruff 12, St. Andrews 6
1957 – Woodruff 14, L.B. Clearwater 12
1965 – Woodruff 12, Berkeley 7
1975 – Woodruff 21, Bamberg-Ehrhardt 14
1976 – Woodruff 31, Lake View 0
1977 – Woodruff 27, Mayo 6
1978 – Woodruff 30, Andrews 0
1980 – Woodruff 34, Swansea 0
1983 – Woodruff 7, St. John’s 0
1984 – Woodruff 23, St. John’s 7
