= Edith Mansford Fitzgerald =

- Edith Mansford Fitzgerald
- Born: 1877; Memphis, Tennessee
- Died: June 26, 1940
- Other names: Edith Fitzgerald
- Occupations: teacher, inventor
- Years active: 1904–1938
- Known for: Fitzgerald Key

Edith Mansford Fitzgerald (1877–1940) was a deaf American woman who invented a system for the deaf to learn proper placement of words in the construction of sentences. Her method, which was known as the 'Fitzgerald Key,' was used to teach those with hearing disabilities in three-quarters of the schools in the United States.

== Biography ==
Edith Mansford Fitzgerald was born in 1877 in Memphis, Tennessee. After attending public schools, she believed that her disability stunted her learning process. At these schools, she was taught through the method of lip reading. Later on, she enrolled in the Illinois School for the Deaf in Jacksonville, Illinois. After graduating, she then attended Gallaudet University in Washington, D.C. completing her B.A. in 1903 and graduated as valedictorian of her class.

== Career ==
Fitzgerald began teaching soon after her graduation and taught in regular sessions and also trained teachers at Training Colleges over the summers. She served at the Wisconsin School for the Deaf in Delavan, Wisconsin for 17 years and then, in 1921, taught at the Louisiana School for the Deaf. The following year, she moved to the Arkansas School for the Deaf and, in 1924, was made assistant principal at the Virginia School for the Deaf and the Blind in Staunton, Virginia. While she was teaching in Virginia, Fitzgerald developed a system of teaching which became known as the "Fitzgerald Key". The program taught students to write linear sentences which were grammatically correct. By following the placement of subject, verb, object, and adjectival phrase in a specific order, students learned to construct sentences which were easily understood in their language. During the summer sessions, she taught at normal schools in Kansas, Milwaukee and Virginia and in the summer of 1930, she taught in the summer faculty at Johns Hopkins University. In 1933, Fitzgerald moved to the Georgia School for the Deaf in Cave Spring and the following year took a post at the Texas School for the Deaf in Austin, where she remained for three years. She worked in Oak Park, Illinois in 1937, where the National Fraternal Society for the Deaf was located. That same year, she spoke at the Biennial Meeting of the Convention of American Instructors of the Deaf and completed a study course at Columbia University. Fitzgerald returned to Cave Spring, Georgia in 1938, and died 2 years later on 26 June 1940.

== Legacy ==
Fitzgerald's seminal work 'Straight Language for the Deaf: A System of Instruction for Deaf Children' was published in 1926 and was widely influential in the field of deaf education. Because the "Fitzgerald Key" gave additional visual support to those who had not heard language construction, it allowed students to correct their own grammar and syntax mistakes. At one time, her system was so widely used that three-quarters of the schools in the United States teaching those with hearing difficulties used it. Her book had been through nine editions by 1962.

In 2018 the Virginia Capitol Foundation announced that Fitzgerald's name would be on the Virginia Women's Monument's glass Wall of Honor.

== Selected works ==
- Fitzgerald, Edith Mansford. Signs and pure oralism. Washington, D.C.: National Association of the Deaf.
- Kennard, Marie Sewell; Fitzgerald, Edith Mansford (1939). Suggestions for mental development. Cave Springs, Georgia: Georgia School for the Deaf.
- Kennard, Marie Sewell; Fitzgerald, Edith Mansford (1939). Straight language discusses arithmetic. Cave Springs, Georgia: Georgia School for the Deaf.
- Kennard, Marie Sewell; Fitzgerald, Edith Mansford (1941). Nature study. Cave Springs, Georgia: Georgia School for the Deaf.
- Fitzgerald, Edith Mansford (1962). Straight Language for the Deaf: A System of Instruction for Deaf Children (9th ed.). Washington, D.C.: Volta Bureau. ISBN 9780882000763.
- Holcomb, Marjoriebell, Stakley; Wood, Sharon (1989). Deaf women : A parade through the decades (First ed.). Berkeley, California: Dawn Sign Press. ISBN 978-0-915035-28-1.

== Bibliography ==
- Carroll, Cathryn; Fischer, Catherine Hoffpauir (2001). Orchid of the Bayou: A Deaf Woman Faces Blindness. Washington, DC: Gallaudet University Press. ISBN 978-1-56368-104-2.
- Glennen, Sharon; DeCoste, Denise C. (1997). The Handbook of Augmentative and Alternative Communication. San Diego, California: Cengage Learning. ISBN 1-56593-684-1.
- Hull, Callie; West, Clarence (1931). Reprint and Circular Series of the National Research Council. Washington, DC: National Academies. NAP:12027.
- Nicolosi, Lucille; Harryman, Elizabeth; Kresheck, Janet (2004). Terminology of Communication Disorders: Speech-language-hearing (5th ed.). Philadelphia, Pennsylvania: Lippincott Williams & Wilkins. ISBN 978-0-7817-4196-5.
- Simpson, William M (1963). Edith Fitzgerald, 1877–1940: Originator of the Straight Language System. Washington, D.C.: Gallaudet College.
