= Naomi Silverman Cohn =

American civic leader (1888–1982)

- Born: Mayme Silverman; April 15, 1888; Bristol, Pennsylvania, US
- Died: October 20, 1982 (aged 94); Milwaukee, Wisconsin, US
- Occupations: Social activist, government worker
- Children: 3

Naomi Silverman Cohn (April 15, 1888 – October 20, 1982) was an American social activist and government worker. She cofounded the Virginia Council on State Legislation which followed legislative bills dedicated to women's issues. Cohn directed the Division of Women and Children of the Virginia Department of Labor and Industry until 1942. Her activism resulted in posthumous recognition by the Women of Virginia Historic Trail and Virginia Women in History. Cohn's name was added to the Virginia Women's Monument in 2020.

== Early life ==
Cohn's parents, Harri and Sadie Silverman, had both emigrated from Poland to Bristol, Pennsylvania with their children; there, her father found work peddling crockery. Naomi, who for the first two decades of her life gave her name officially as "Mayme Silverman", was born two years after their emigration. She attended school locally while her older sisters spun yarn at a local mill and worked in a dry goods store; it is possible that she studied to become a teacher. On March 30, 1909, at the home of her parents, she married Jacob Saul Cohn, a 1904 University of Richmond graduate who worked as a lawyer in Richmond, Virginia, to which the couple soon moved. They went on to have three children, two daughters and a son, and took in Naomi's orphaned, twin nephews as well.

== Career and activism ==
Cohn quickly became heavily involved in the civic affairs of her adopted city. Around 1911, she joined the local chapter of the National Council of Jewish Women, and in 1920, she was a charter member of the Richmond League of Women Voters; beginning as treasurer of the latter group in the 1930s, she later became active with the state chapter, at various times serving as its vice-president, secretary, and chair of the legislative committee. Around 1922, she began to sit on the industrial committee of the Young Women's Christian Association. Together with Adele Goodman Clark, in 1923 she founded the Virginia Women's Council of Legislative Chairmen of State Organizations, later known as the Virginia Council on State Legislation, to observe and follow legislative bills dedicated to women's issues; she would later be treasurer and president of this group. She became the executive secretary of the Virginia Consumers' League not long after that organization's formation in 1936. In 1938 she lobbied the Virginia legislature to pass a law restricting a woman's work week to forty-eight hours, except for certain specially designated professions; she spent up to thirteen hours each day at the Virginia State Capitol as part of her efforts, which were ultimately successful. Cohn entered government service in 1939 when she became an inspector of factories and mercantile businesses for the Division of Women and Children of the Virginia Department of Labor and Industry; she also continued to direct the division until 1942, when she took a job with the Office of Price Administration in Richmond.

Cohn's interest in governance continued after World War II, when in 1947 she served as vice-chair of the campaign to replace Richmond's city charter; the proposed replacement, which was adopted, would replace a bicameral city council with one nine-member body and implemented a city-manager system. In 1950, she ran as an independent for an at-large seat on the council, the only woman in a field of twenty-three; her platform advocating a new home for juvenile detention, more schools, a crime study program, and a program to clear slums led to her endorsement by the Richmond Democratic League. Although she cited her involvement in the Richmond Citizens Association as grounds for running, that group did not endorse her candidacy. In the election, she received 3,553 votes, placing eighteenth in the field. Despite her loss, she continued to be active in public life, testifying before members of the Virginia legislature in 1954 in favor of the repeal of the poll tax.

Cohn once ascribed her interest in the plight of working women and children to the excesses she had witnessed as a young woman growing up in Bristol. Her husband died of heart failure on November 15, 1938 and was interred in the Hebrew Cemetery in Richmond. In her latter years she moved to Milwaukee to live with her elder daughter, Sarah A. Cohn Ettenheim; she died there in 1982. After her cremation her ashes were interred next to her husband in Richmond.

== Honors ==
Cohn's efforts on behalf of Virginia's working women led to her being named to the "Virginia Honor Roll of 1938" of the Richmond Times-Dispatch, published on January 1, 1939. In 1993, she was one of the first thirty honorees on the Women of Virginia Historic Trail created by the Virginia Business and Professional Women's Foundation; the plaque honoring her was erected at Richmond's Congregation Beth Ahabah. In 2014, she was named one of the Library of Virginia's Virginia Women in History. In March 2016, she was one of four Richmond women honored by the Greater Richmond Transit Company by having their names placed on bus destination header signs and highlighted online to honor Women's History Month. In 2020, hers was included on the initial list of names added to the Virginia Women's Monument.
