= Susanne B. Hirt =

American physical therapy professor (1913–2006)

- Susanne B. Hirt, circa 1981
- Born: Berta Susanne Hirsch; August 1, 1913; Berlin, Germany
- Died: September 17, 2006 (aged 93)
- Occupations: Physical therapist, professor, department chair
- Awards: Mary McMillan Lecture Award from the American Physical Therapy Association

Academic background
- Education: University of Berlin; University of Vienna; University of Wisconsin
- Alma mater: University of Virginia

Academic work
- Discipline: Physical therapy
- Institutions: University of Wisconsin and Medical College of Virginia

Susanne Berthe Hirt (August 1, 1913 – September 17, 2006) was a physical therapist and professor at the Medical College of Virginia (MCV). She helped develop the School of Physical Therapy at MCV and became chair of the department and later a Professor Emeritus. She received the Mary McMillan Lecture Award from the American Physical Therapy Association in 1981.

== Biography ==
Hirt was born Berta Susanne Hirsch on August 1, 1913, in Berlin to Joseph and Dorothea Hirsch. She was the youngest of four children, including two half-siblings from the previous marriage of her father. Her father died when she was eight. She graduated high school in Germany in 1929.

Hirt attended the University of Berlin to study medicine until she was expelled in 1934 because she was Jewish. She then attended the University of Vienna for two semesters until having to again leave school, and then began attending a course in physical education and kinesiology as well as working with children with cerebral palsy.

After German troops arrived in Vienna in 1938, she became an au pair and then immigrated with the family to the United States. In 1939, she changed her name, and later said she was required by the father of the family to change her name "from Hirsch to [Susanne Berthe Hirt] because he did not want the world to know that he was Jewish." Her siblings immigrated to the United Kingdom, but her mother was deported from Germany to Riga and died in a concentration camp in 1942.

In 1942, she completed a certificate program in physical therapy from the University of Wisconsin (UW), which included instruction from Elizabeth Kenny, and became a United States citizen. She then worked at the Wisconsin General Hospital as the chief physical therapist for polio patients, and taught anatomy and pathology courses at UW. She was invited to teach and help develop the School of Physical Therapy at the Medical College of Virginia (MCV) by Frances A. Hellebrandt, whom she had met during her work with polio patients when Hellebrandt was the director of the UW physical therapy school. She began working at MCV in 1945 as an assistant professor of anatomy and the supervisor of the polio clinics.

In 1948, she became the technical director of the School of Physical Therapy after completing her Bachelor of Science at the University of Wisconsin. She completed her master's degree in education from the University of Virginia in 1956. In 1969, when the Department of Physical Therapy was created, she became the department chair until 1982. After her retirement from her position as department chair, she continued to teach as a Professor Emeritus.

Hirt began studying the Feldenkrais Method of exercise therapy in 1979 and taught the method at senior centers and her home after her retirement from MCV.

She died on September 17, 2006.

== Works ==
- Payton, Otto D; Hirt, Susanne; Newton, Roberta A (1977). Scientific bases for neurophysiologic approaches to therapeutic exercise : An anthology. Philadelphia: Davis. ISBN 9780803667952.
- Hirt, Susanne (November 1, 1981). "Progress Is a Relay Race". Physical Therapy. Sixteenth Mary McMillan Lecture. 61 (11). American Physical Therapy Association: 1609–1612. doi:10.1093/ptj/61.11.1609. PMID 7029574.

== Honors and awards ==
- 1942 Phi Beta Kappa
- 1981 Mary McMillan Lecture Award from the American Physical Therapy Association
- 1983 Woman of the Year for health and fitness, Greater Richmond YWCA
- In 2018 the Virginia Capitol Foundation announced that Hirt's name would be on the Virginia Women's Monument's glass Wall of Honor.

== See also ==
- Anti-Jewish legislation in pre-war Nazi Germany
