= Eudora Ramsay Richardson =

American women's rights activist, public servant and author

- Born: August 13, 1891; Versailles, Woodford County, Kentucky
- Died: October 6, 1973 (aged 82); Richmond, Virginia
- Resting place: Hollywood Cemetery; Richmond, Virginia, U.S.
- Education: Hollins College, University of Richmond, Columbia University
- Occupations: director of the Virginia Writers Program, Author
- Spouse: Fitzhugh Briggs Richardson
- Children: Eudora (Dolly) Richardson Smith
- Parent(s): David Marshall Ramsay, Mary Woolfolk Ramsay

Eudora Ramsay Richardson (August 13, 1891 – October 6, 1973) was an American women's suffrage activist, lecturer and writer. She may be best known as the Virginia director for the Federal Writers' Project, which with her as editor in 1940 published two often-republished volumes Virginia: A Guide to the Old Dominion and The Negro in Virginia.

== Early and family life ==
Born in Versailles, Kentucky, the hometown of her mother, the former Eudora Woolfolk. Her father, Rev. David Marshall Ramsay (1857-1957), was a Baptist minister and soon accepted a position at Citadel Square Baptist Church in Charleston, South Carolina, where Eudora grew up. Her father was the only surviving son of his father (who himself survived two wives and was prominent in the Lickville Presbyterian Church in Greenville County, South Carolina. In 1907, Rev. Ramsay accepted a position at Grace Street Baptist Church in Richmond, Virginia, and moved his family to Virginia's capital city. Eudora was educated at Hollins Institute (now Hollins University) in Virginia, from which she graduated in 1910, and then at Richmond's Westhampton College (later part of the Baptist-founded University of Richmond), from which she graduated in 1911. In her 1911 college yearbook, The Spider Ramsay was described as "just a few years ahead of her time" on the issue of women's suffrage. During her teaching career in South Carolina, as described below, Richardson continued her own studies and in 1914 earned a master's degree from Columbia University in New York City.

On December 13, 1917, Ramsay married Fitzhugh Briggs Richardson, an attorney from Surry County, Virginia whom she met while speaking for woman suffrage. The couple moved to Richmond, where he served briefly as an assistant attorney general, and later chaired the board of the Virginia Mutual Savings and Loan Association. They had one daughter, Eudora (Dolly) Ramsay Smith (1920-1999). Fitzhugh Richardson died of a heart attack on July 13, 1964.

== Career ==
In 1912, Ramsay moved to Greenville, South Carolina, having accepted a position as head of the English Department at Greenville Woman's College, perhaps in part because her father had become the college's president the previous year (he served from 1911 until 1931, when the college merged with Furman University). She was a popular teacher, named the literary societies that became an important part of college life, and had a stated goal of educating girls "who are staunch advocates of women's rights".

In March 1913, Ramsay participated in the national woman suffrage parade in Washington, D.C. and in 1914 helped found (and became secretary of) the suffrage league in Greenville. She left Greenville Woman's College in 1914 to begin a three-year public speaking career. Ramsay became a field director of the National American Woman Suffrage Association and worked closely with Carrie Chapman Catt. She initially organized in Pennsylvania, then in Maine, New York, South Carolina, Tennessee, West Virginia and Oklahoma. Lila Hardaway Meade Valentine, president of the Equal Suffrage League of Virginia, arranged to pay part of her salary as Ramsay traveled across the Commonwealth speaking to various groups. She spoke before a committee of the Virginia General Assembly in January 1916. After the local and national groups changed strategies, organized about a dozen new chapters in two counties on Virginia's Eastern Shore in April 1917, then in May 1917 traveled more than a thousand miles in several trips across southern Virginia as well as the Shenandoah Valley.

Ramsay also met her future husband during one of these speaking engagements, and while her field director position ended when she married in December 1917, she continued speaking on behalf of the Richmond Equal Suffrage League. She also became the director of the Woman's Division of the War Loan Organization in the Fifth Federal Reserve District (headquartered in Richmond) and served as the publicity director and instructor of publicity at the secretarial school of Smithdeal Business College in Richmond.

Mrs. Richardson would continue public speaking for most of her life. The Nineteenth Amendment to the United States Constitution gave American women the right to vote in 1920, the year her only child, a daughter, was born. By year's end, she was named to the organizing committee of the Virginia League of Women Voters.

Richardson spoke often at Greenville Women's College in the 1920s, and became affiliated with the Southern Women's Educational Alliance, and later became president of the Richmond Branch of the American Association of University Women. She sought to have women taken seriously as political leaders, community activists and employees, and opposed protective legislation, which she saw as attempting to take away the legal equality that women had fought long and hard to achieve. In 1938, Richardson became the state supervisor of the Virginia Writers' Project, as the director of the Federal Writers' Project in the Commonwealth. The project produced various publications, but the two which were often reprinted for decades were the travel guide, Virginia: A Guide to the Old Dominion and the pathbreaking The Negro in Virginia. After her agency was abolished in 1943, Richardson became a writer with the Quartermaster Technical Training Service at Camp Lee in Virginia.

Richardson retired from public service in 1950, but continued to speak on historical topics and women's rights. She also corresponded with figures as diverse as the historian Mary Beard, authors John Erskine and Ellen Glasgow and politicians Harry Flood Byrd, and John Garland Pollard. However, Richardson criticized the "women's lib" movement in the 1970s, stating "Not too much has changed since we got the vote ... We were effective but they're not accomplishing much now."

== Death and legacy ==
Richardson survived her husband by nearly a decade. She died of a stroke in Richmond on October 6, 1973, and was buried beside her husband in the family plot in Hollywood Cemetery in Richmond, as would be their daughter and her husband, Dr. Harry Mason Smith, Jr. Her papers through 1960 are held among the Special Collections of the Alderman Memorial Library of the University of Virginia in Charlottesville. In 2018 the Virginia Capitol Foundation announced that Richardson's name would be included on the Virginia Women's Monument's glass Wall of Honor.

== Works written or edited by Eudora R. Richardson ==
- The Case of Women's Colleges in the South (Durham, N.C. 1930)
- Little Aleck: A Life of Alexander H. Stephens (Bobbs-Merrill Company, Grosset & Dunlope, 1932)
- The Woman Speaker: A Hand-Book and Study Course on Public Speaking (Whittet and Shepperson, 1936)
- The Influence of Men -- Incurable (1936)
- Virginia: A Guide to the Old Dominion (Oxford University Press, 1940)
- The Negro in Virginia (Hastings House, New York, 1940)
