= Laura Copenhaver =

American businesswoman (1868–1940)

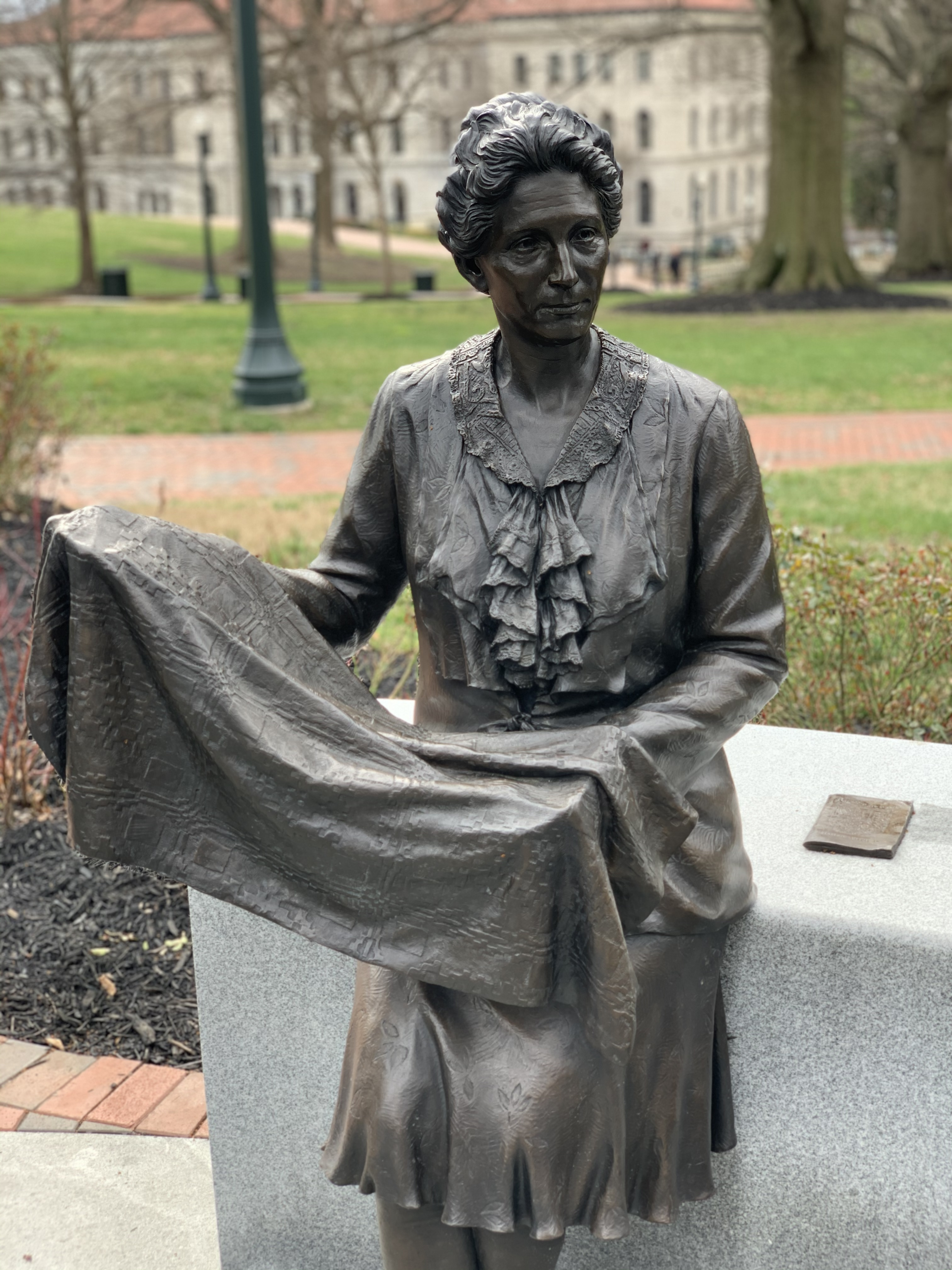
Statue of Laura Copenhaver included in the Virginia Women's Monument.

Laura Lu Scherer Copenhaver (August 29, 1868 – December 18, 1940) was an American businesswoman.

Copenhaver was a native of Marion, Virginia, where her father, the Reverend John Jacob Scherer, was the first president of Marion College. She was a writer, collaborating with her younger sister, Katharine Killinger Scherer Cronk, on fiction, poetry, and church pageants; her poem "Heralds of Christ" became a popular hymn. Copenhaver was the director of information for the Virginia Farm Bureau Federation, and in that role advanced the agricultural economy of southwestern Virginia. In this role she emphasized cooperative marketing of farm products, and herself was involved in the same practice by producing textiles out of her home, Rosemont, hiring local women to craft coverlets based on traditional patterns, using locally produced wool. Copenhaver pressed her local Women's Missionary Society to establish the Konnarock Training School, which offered entry-level academic and religious education to children who could not attend the regular schools, and which opened in 1925.

Copenhaver was the mother-in-law of Sherwood Anderson, and was long active as a lay leader in the Lutheran Church. After her death her sister Minerva May Scherer headed Rosemont Industries for two decades; in 1960 some of her children incorporated it as Laura Copenhaver Industries, Inc. Copenhaver was one of the Virginia Women in History inducted by the Library of Virginia in 2007.
