= Lucy Ann Cox =

American Civil War Nurse

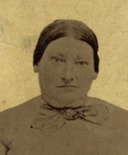
- 1880s portrait of Cox
- Born: Lucy Ann White c. 1826–1827; Fredericksburg, VA, U.S.
- Died: December 17, 1891 (aged 64); Fredericksburg, VA, U.S.
- Spouse(s): James A. Cox (m. 1862)
- Military career
- Allegiance: Confederate States
- Regiment: 30th Virginia Infantry Regiment
- Rank: Vivandière
- Unit: Company A
- Awards: See list

Lucy Ann Cox (born either 1826 or 1827 – December 17, 1891) was a nurse and cook who served unofficially with the Virginia Infantry during the American Civil War. She was voted an honorary Confederate veteran after the war, a distinction conferred to few women in Civil War history.

== Early life and family ==
Lucy Ann White was born between 1826 and 1827, the daughter of Lucinda Snellings White and Jesse White, publisher of the Fredericksburg Weekly Advertiser.

In January 1862, she married James A. Cox, a member of Company A of the 30th Virginia Infantry Regiment.

== Civil War ==
During the American Civil War, Cox sought to remain close to and support her husband during his service. At first, officers of James Cox's regiment strongly disapproved of his wife accompanying the troops, and ordered her to remain away from the camp. In response, Cox defiantly set up a ten on the outskirts of the camp. In time, her resourcefulness and usefulness to the group as a seamstress and nurse convinced the officers to make an exception and allow her in the camp on a permanent basis.

Cox became a vivandière, or "daughter of the regiment," unofficially joining the 30th Virginia Infantry Regiment and serving in a volunteer capacity as a cook, laundress, nurse to wounded soldiers, and helpmate for the men in Company A for four years. Her needles and thimble, which she likely used to knit socks and scarves for soldiers in the regiment, is now in the archives of the American Civil War Museum.

Cox was with the regiment during the Battle of Fredericksburg and the Battle of Petersburg, and remained a part of the regiment until the surrender of General Robert E. Lee at Appomattox. She was widely known by the nom de guerre "Pawnee."

== Later life ==
After the war, Cox and her husband returned to her parents' home in Fredericksburg to resume working in the printing trade.

In the 1880s, Cox and her husband attended reunions of the 30th Virginia Infantry Regiment.

== Death ==
Cox died in Fredericksburg on December 17, 1891, aged 64, after a period of illness.

== Honors ==
- After her death, Cox was buried with military honors, Confederate organizations held a celebration of her wartime service, and local women raised funds to erect a memorial at her burial site.
- Cox was voted as an honorary Confederate Veteran.
- A Virginia chapter of the Order of Southern Gray is named in honor of Cox.
- The 2025 historical fiction novel Daughter of the Regiment was dedicated to Cox.
- In 2018, the Virginia Capitol Foundation announced that Cotton's name would be on the Virginia Women's Monument's glass Wall of Honor.
- Cox has been included in curriculum for students to learn about the role of women in the American Civil War.
- Cox has been portrayed by Civil War re-enactors as part of Civil War history programs in Fredericksburg.
