= Lucille Chaffin Kent =

American aviator

- Born: April 28, 1908
- Died: June 3, 1997 (aged 89); Lynchburg, Virginia
- Education: Randolph-Macon Woman's College
- Occupations: aviator and instructor
- Spouse: Robert Bruce Caldwell (1924-1946) William C. Kent (1984-death)

Lucille Chaffin Kent (1908–1997) was an American aviator and instructor known for training military pilots during World War II.

== Early life and education ==
Lucille Chaffin was born in Campbell County, Virginia on 28 April 1908 to Lula and Walter Beverley Chaffin Snr, who worked in life insurance. Chaffin had two siblings, Evelyn Brown and Claude Charrin. She attended Ferrum College and Randolph-Macon Woman's College in Lynchburg, Virginia, graduating in 1938.

== Career ==
She was one of the first women in Virginia to earn an instructor's rating in aeronautics. She worked at the Civilian Pilot Training Program in Lynchburg where she served as director of the ground school. She taught for Lynchburg College at various locations during the World War II era and instructed about 2,000 future pilots who would go on the serve in the military. Once the war had ended, Chaffin became a music instructor at Liberty University. In 1984, she published a series of two books titled, That Our Heirs May Know. The books contain stories from both the Kent family and the Chaffin family. Additionally, Chaffin wrote an aeronautics manual.

== Personal life ==
Chaffin married Robert Bruce Caldwell on December 24, 1924, later divorcing him in September 1946. She then married William C. Kent in 1948. The couple had two sons, Peter A. Kent and John A. Kent.

She died on June 3, 1997.

== Commemoration ==
In 2016 the Virginia Department of Historic Resources dedicated an historical marker in her honor in Lynchburg. In 2018 the Virginia Capitol Foundation announced that her name would be on the Virginia Women's Monument's glass Wall of Honor.
