= Claudia Lane Dodson =

American athletic administrator (1941–2007)

- Born: August 31, 1941; Washington, D.C., U.S.
- Died: August 18, 2007 (aged 65); Charlottesville, Virginia, U.S.
- Education: Westhampton College; University of Tennessee
- Employer: Virginia High School League
- Board member of: United States Olympic Committee Women's Basketball Committee; USA Basketball Committee for Women; National Basketball Committee
- Partner: Brenda Langdon
- Awards: See list

Claudia Lane Dodson (August 31, 1941 – August 18, 2007) was an American athlete, educator, athletic administrator, and advocate for women's and girls' sports.

== Early life and education ==
Claudia L. Dodson was born on August 31, 1941, in Washington, D.C., the daughter of Claude J. and Edna Lane Dodson. As a child growing up in pre-Title IX American, she was not allowed to play baseball in elementary school, and this early experience shaped her belief that girls should have equal access to all sports.

Dodson graduated from Thomas Dale High School, where she played field hockey, basketball, and softball.

In 1963, Dodson graduated from Westhampton College with a Bachelor of Science in Health and Physical Education and received a Masters of Science in Physical Education from the University of Tennessee in 1965. While in college, she lettered in basketball, field hockey, and lacrosse.

== Career ==
From 1966 to 1970, Dodson chaired the girls physical education department and taught physical education at Meadowbrook High School in Chesterfield County. In 1971, Dodson was hired as the assistant director of the Virginia High School League (VHSL). She was the fourth woman in the United States to be employed as a State Association Administrator and the first woman to hold the role in Virginia history.

In her leadership role, Dodson was instrumental with Title IX implementation and the advancement of girl's sports, including authoring a guidebook for school districts to understand best practices for Title IX compliance. She worked to expand opportunities for girls to participate in Virginia athletics, encouraged cable and local news channels to air girls sporting events, expanded opportunities from one sport to thirteen during her tenure, expanded the number of regional finals available to female athletes, increased the number of girls state championships from zero to thirty-one, and enacted regulations requiring every Virginia high school to offer at least two sports for girls during each of the three athletic seasons.

Dodson was the first woman appointed to the National Basketball Committee of the United States and Canada (serving from 1976 to 1981), and was chairperson of the United States Olympic Committee Women's Basketball Committee from 1976 to 1980, and chaired the Amateur Basketball Association's Committee for Women.

Dodson was the first woman to serve on the National Basketball Rules Committee for the National Collegiate Athletic Association, National Association of Intercollegiate Athletics, and National Federation of State High School Associations, and was instrumental in establishing the NFHS Equity Committee in the 1990s.

She also worked as Administrative Manager for the United States Olympic Committee National Junior Women's Basketball team tour in Ecuador, Bolivia and Peru, and worked with the Atlantic Coast Conference as a Women's Basketball Officials Observer for the University of Virginia.

In 1996, Dodson established the Women in Sports ("WinS") Foundation, a nonprofit organization with the mission of supporting and recognizing female athletes in Virginia.

Dodson retired from her role at VHSL in 2002, after more than thirty years of service to the organization.

== Personal life ==
Dodson was openly lesbian and lived with her longtime companion Brenda Langdon.

== Death ==
Dodson died on August 18, 2007, at the University of Virginia Medical Center after suffering a heart attack.

== Works ==
- A Study of Physical Fitness as Determined by the Kraus-Weber Test (1965), author
- Title IX: How to Comply (1976), author
- Steroids: A Resource Guide (1991), contributor and review committee member
- The Virginia High School League (1992), author
- Guide to Effective Coaching: Principles & Practice (1993), contributor
- The Development and Validation of the Junior Tennis Anger Questionnaire (1996), contributor
- Advisory List of International Educational Travel and Exchange Programs (2000), contributor and review committee member

== Awards and recognition ==
- Dodson was named to the Who's Who of American Women.
- Dodson was an inductee to the Virginia Softball Hall of Fame (1993), Virginia High School Hall of Fame (2002), and National High School Hall of Fame (2004).
- In 2001, she received the Donald Huff Award from The Washington Post.
- In 1996, the National Interscholastic Athletic Administrators Association awarded Dodson with its Distinguished Service Award.
- In 2007, the VHSL renamed its Sportsmanship, Ethics, and Integrity Award in Dodson's honor.
- In 2008, the WinS Foundation established the Claudia Lane Dodson Equity Award in her honor.
- In 2018, Dodson's name was included on the Wall of Honor of the Virginia Women's Monument.
- In 2019, Dodson was posthumously inducted into the Virginia Women in History.
- She is the namesake of the Claudia L. Dodson Scholarship Fund.
