= May Lansfield Keller =

- Born: September 28, 1877; Baltimore, Maryland
- Died: June 28, 1964 (aged 86); Richmond, Virginia
- Education: Ph.D.
- Alma mater: Heidelberg University
- Parent(s): Wilmer Lansfield Keller; Jeanie Simonton

May Lansfield Keller (September 28, 1877 − June 28, 1964) was a college professor and dean.

Born in Baltimore, Maryland to Wilmer Lansfield Keller and Jeanie née Simonton, May Lansfield Keller received an early private school education at the Little Dames' School in the Baltimore area. From 1888 to 1894, she studied at the Girls' Latin School, then matriculated to Goucher College in 1894. She joined Pi Beta Phi, and would remain active in the sorority past her graduation in 1898. At this point she became interested in taking graduate studies in Germany, but her father was opposed so she instead enrolled at the University of Chicago in the fall of 1898. However, she didn't appreciate how women were treated at the institution.

Gaining her father's consent, in 1901 she traveled to Heidelberg, Germany, to study for her doctorate with financial assistance from her family and from Goucher. The universities at both Heidelberg and Freiburg had allowed women to matriculate beginning in 1900, but nonetheless she met stiff resistance to her enrollment. What she did find though was that, educationally, when she overcame the obstacles placed in her path she was treated no differently than the men in her classes. She graduated with a doctoral degree in 1905 magna cum laude with a thesis titled The Anglo-Saxon Weapon Names − with an Archaeological Investigation of the Weapons of Attack and Defense in Use among the Anglo-Saxons from the 5th Century to the Time of the Norman Conquest.

Upon her return to the United States, a job was waiting her. From 1904 to 1906, she was head of the Department of German at Wells College in New York, becoming associate professor of English in 1906 at Goucher College. Dr. Keller became Grand President of Pi Beta Phi in 1908, and held that position until 1918. She founded the Maryland branch of the Southern Association of College Women in 1909, then served as president of the organization during 1910–1914. In 1914, Keller became dean of the newly formed Westhampton College in Richmond, and would remain at that position for 32 years, retiring June, 1946. She was the first woman to be named dean of a Virginia college.

The Pi Beta Phi foundation named the May Lansfield Keller Award for Philanthropic Leadership after her, as was the Keller Hall named at Westhampton College. In 2018 the Virginia Capitol Foundation announced that Keller's name would be on the Virginia Women's Monument's glass Wall of Honor.
