= Orleana Hawks Puckett =

American midwife

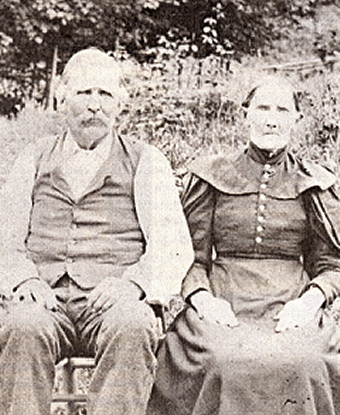
John and Orlena Puckett, circa 1912

Orleana Hawks Puckett (c. 1844–1938) was an American midwife in the mountains of Patrick County and Carroll County, Virginia. In 2012 Puckett was posthumously honored as one of the Library of Virginia's "Virginia Women in History".

== Life ==
Puckett served as a midwife from 1889 until 1938, a year before she died. She started being a midwife after she herself had lost 24 children. Reasons for these deaths are unclear, but a likely reason is that she had a disease that affected her babies in the womb, like Rh hemolytic disease. Most of her children were stillborn, and if they did live, they only survived for a few days. Even though she was unable to successfully have children, or maybe because of that, she decided to assist her neighbors in Carroll County during childbirth. She was almost 50 years old when she started her “practice”, on a completely voluntarily basis. The last delivery she assisted was that of Maxwell Hawks, on August 30, 1938.

== Name ==
Since Puckett herself was illiterate, the spelling of her first name is uncertain. In 1913, when she applied for a pension because her husband had served in the Confederate Army, the notary filled in "Orleana". Some of the different names are Orlean, Orlena, Aulina or even Pauline.

== Legacy ==
Her last home was a tiny one-room wood cabin hardly larger than an average dining room; it has been preserved by the National Park Service and may be seen along the Blue Ridge Parkway at mile 189.9.

The Orelena Hawks Puckett Institute in Asheville, North Carolina continues her legacy to care for mother and child. They promote and try to strengthen the development of child, parents, and family.

In 2018 the Virginia Capitol Foundation announced that Puckett's name would be included on the Virginia Women's Monument's glass Wall of Honor.
