= Martha Louisa Cocke =

American college president

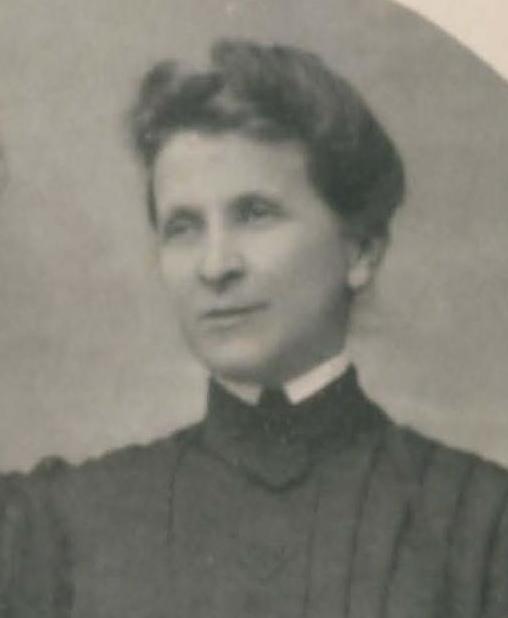
- Born: October 9, 1855; Hollins, Virginia.
- Died: August 15, 1938 (aged 82)
- Other names: Matty Cocke, Miss Matty
- Occupation: college president

Martha "Matty" Louisa Cocke (October 9, 1855 – August 15, 1938) was an American educator known for being the president of Hollins College, the first woman college president in Virginia.

== Early life and education ==
Cocke was born in 1855 to Charles Lewis Cocke and Susanna Virginia Pleasants Cocke, one of nine children. Her father was the superintendent of the Hollins Institute which he had founded, and the family lived on the grounds. She graduated from the collegiate department in 1874.

== Career ==
Cocke's early professional career was as a secretarial assistant to her father in the superintendent's office. Two years after her graduation she was employed as an instructor of English, French, German, and mathematics. She became registrar and librarian of the school in 1884. Her father actually owned the deed to the school as a result of money owed to him by the trustees. When he died in 1901 and her eldest brother, the heir apparent, had predeceased him, the remaining heirs were left to select a new president and they chose Matty Cocke.

Cocke assumed the presidency but shied away from public events and functions. Despite this, she was well-liked on campus. Students named a short-lived literary society for her and beginning in 1930 would sing to her every year on her birthday. The Institute underwent a growth period under her leadership: faculty and staff increased from about forty to more than sixty in 1933; the school built over a dozen new buildings; and popular intellectuals were frequent visitors to campus. The school began awarding an A.B. degree in 1903, and in February 1911 it officially changed its name to Hollins College. By the time Cocke retired in 1933 it had adopted a four-year college curriculum and was fully accredited. When Cocke retired, she transferred ownership of the college from the family to a public board of overseers

Cocke was awarded an honorary Doctor of Laws from Roanoke College in 1926. She died at home at Hollins College on August 15, 1938, and is buried in the family cemetery on the campus. Her papers are held by Hollins University. She is listed on the Wall of Honor of the Virginia Women's Monument.
