= National High School Hall of Fame =

Hall of Fame Program for High School sports

- Formation: 1982
- Purpose: Athletic/Educational
- Headquarters: 690 W. Washington St. Indianapolis, Indiana 46204, United States
- Location: Indianapolis, Indiana
- Region served: United States
- Executive Director: Dr. Karissa Niehoff
- Parent organization: National Federation of State High School Associations
- Website: nfhs.org

The National High School Hall of Fame is a program of the National Federation of State High School Associations (NFHS) that honors individuals who have made outstanding contributions to high school sports or performing arts. As of 2025, a total of 540 individuals have been inducted since the first class in 1982. Because there is a huge pool of potential candidates, it is considered a very exclusive hall of fame.

== Selection process ==
Each of the National Federation's 51 member associations (50 state associations plus the District of Columbia) is allowed to submit a nomination in six categories: athlete, coach, contest official, administrator, performing arts, and other. A screening committee narrows the field before a separate selection committee makes the final decision. A class generally includes 12 inductees, although some have been larger or smaller.

Many famous professional, college, and Olympic athletes and coaches have been inducted into the National High School Hall of Fame, but the selection criteria have always focused on a candidate's high school career or connection to high school competition as an adult.

== History ==
The program was originally known as the National High School Sports Hall of Fame. The word "Sports" was dropped in 2003 when a category for performing arts was added.

The first class was announced in November 1982 and honored on December 14, 1982, in conjunction with the National Athletic Directors Conference in Indianapolis. By design the inaugural class did not include any athletes. Later classes have included members from all categories. For many years the National Federation displayed plaques representing the inductees at its headquarters in Kansas City, Missouri, while it developed plans for a museum in a separate building nearby. Those plans were later scrapped, and when the Federation moved its headquarters to Indianapolis, Indiana, the plaques were transferred to the respective state high school associations for display.

Since 1986, the Hall of Fame enshrinement ceremony has been the final event of the National Federation's annual summer meeting, which is held in late June and early July and attended by board members and executives of the state associations.

== Inductees by year ==
In 2012 biographical sketches of inductees were included in a commemorative 30 year book. The NHFS also maintains biographical sketches of inductees on their website. Below is a list of inductee names. Following each name is the category in which the person was inducted and the state high school association that submitted the nomination. Inductees who spent all or a portion of their career on the staff of the National Federation are indicated by "NF".

1982 (Inaugural class)
- Tom Barringer, coach, Pennsylvania
- Jordan Besozzi, official, Ohio
- Kurt Beyer, administrator, New York
- Norm Geske, official, Illinois
- Harley Graf, administrator, Wisconsin
- James "Bee" Harper, official, South Carolina
- Art Hendricks, coach, Ohio
- Paul McCall, administrator, Oregon
- Chuck Moser, coach, Texas
- H. V. Porter, administrator, Illinois (NF)
- Walter Shublom, coach, Kansas
- Arthur Trout, coach, Illinois

1983

- Bill Bradley, athlete, Missouri
- Jimmie Bryan, coach, Virginia
- Dwight Eddleman, athlete, Illinois
- Cliff Fagan, administrator, Wisconsin (NF)
- Vergil Fletcher, coach, Illinois
- Charles Forsythe, administrator, Michigan
- Ken Hall, athlete, Texas
- Floyd Lay, administrator, Florida
- Jesse Owens, athlete, Ohio
- Oscar Robertson, athlete, Indiana
- Jim Ryun, athlete, Kansas
- Boyce Smith, coach, Tennessee
- Milt Sprunger, administrator, Illinois
- Thomas Stanton, coach, Missouri
- Bertha Frank Teague, coach, Oklahoma
- Gordon Wood, coach, Texas
- Fred "Brick" Young, official, Illinois

1984

- Denise Long Andre, athlete, Iowa
- Julius "Pinky" Babb, coach, South Carolina
- C. H. "Okie" Blanchard, coach, Wyoming
- Jennings Boyd, coach, West Virginia
- Win Brockmeyer, coach, Wisconsin
- Sid Cichy, coach, North Dakota
- Joseph Coviello, coach, New Jersey
- Jerry Dellinger, coach, Idaho
- Dan Gable, athlete, Iowa
- Harold "Red" Grange, athlete, Illinois
- Paul Neverman, administrator, Wisconsin
- Jack Nicklaus, athlete, Ohio

1986

- Alan Ameche, athlete, Wisconsin
- Johnny Bench, athlete, Oklahoma
- Bart Conner, athlete, Illinois
- Harry "Swede" Dahlberg, coach, Montana
- Jim Dutcher, administrator, Montana
- Joe Ferguson, athlete, Louisiana
- Lofton Greene, coach, Michigan
- John L. Griffith, other, Illinois
- Jerry Lucas, athlete, Ohio
- John Mayasich, athlete, Minnesota
- Rick Mount, athlete, Indiana
- Kim Mulkey, athlete, Louisiana
- Cindy Jo Noble, athlete, Ohio
- Arnold Palmer, athlete, Pennsylvania
- Russ Parsons, coach, West Virginia
- Mack Schaffer, official, Ohio
- Robert "Fuzzy" Vandivier, athlete, Indiana
- Paul Walker, coach, Ohio

1987

- Paul Brown, coach, Ohio
- Chandra Cheeseborough, athlete, Florida
- Greever Crouse, official, Virginia
- Charles Farina, coach, Illinois
- Cliff Harper, administrator, Alabama
- John Havlicek, athlete, Ohio
- Janet Karvonen, athlete, Minnesota
- Don Kessinger, athlete, Arkansas
- Bill Martin, coach, Virginia
- Vince Meyer, coach, Iowa
- Al Oerter, athlete, New York
- Merlin Olsen, athlete, Utah
- Marvin Fay Reid, official, Mississippi
- Pat Summerall, athlete, Florida
- Byron White, athlete, Colorado

1988

- Wright Bazemore, coach, Georgia
- Augie Bossu, coach, Ohio
- Len Dawson, athlete, Ohio
- Dan Gaylord, official, Alabama
- Cliff Hagan, athlete, Kentucky
- Brutus Hamilton, athlete, Missouri
- Elroy Hirsch, athlete, Wisconsin
- Bob Jamieson, coach, North Carolina
- Randy Matson, athlete, California
- Mel Otero, official, New Mexico
- Robert Siddens, coach, Iowa
- Ralph Tasker, coach, New Mexico
- Jim Taylor, athlete, Louisiana
- John Youngblood, administrator, Virginia

1989

- Wilbur Braithwaite, coach, Utah
- Quinn Buckner, athlete, Illinois
- John Campbell, coach, Indiana
- Gordon Gillespie, coach, Illinois
- Calvin Harms, official, Iowa
- Paul Hornung, athlete, Kentucky
- Jackie Joyner-Kersee, athlete, Illinois
- Bob Mathias, athlete, California
- Richard Meyer, coach, Ohio
- Ralph Miller, athlete, Kansas
- Bronko Nagurski, athlete, Minnesota
- Bart Starr, athlete, Alabama
- Don Sutton, athlete, Florida
- Norm Van Arsdalen, official, New Jersey
- Lynette Woodard, athlete, Kansas

1990

- Bill Blackburn, official, Oklahoma
- Jimmy Bond, athlete, Texas
- Ralph Bowyer, coach, New Mexico
- Billy Brown, athlete, Louisiana
- Ralph Cummins, coach, Virginia
- Rafer Johnson, athlete, California
- John McKissick, coach, South Carolina
- Cheryl Miller, athlete, California
- Billy Mills, athlete, South Dakota & Kansas
- Keith Parker, official, Illinois
- Joe Romig, athlete, Colorado
- Vincent Schaefer, coach, Florida
- Herman "Bubba" Scott, administrator, Alabama
- Walter "Buck" Van Huss, coach, Tennessee
- Jerry West, athlete, West Virginia

1991

- Bron C. Bacevich, coach, Ohio
- Milt Campbell, athlete, New Jersey
- Nolan Cromwell, athlete, Kansas
- Denise Curry, athlete, California
- Glenn Davis, athlete, Ohio
- Leslie Gaudet, coach, Louisiana
- Tom Landry, athlete, Texas
- Herman Masin, other, New York
- Dick Pace, official, Florida
- Bill Pack, official, Tennessee
- David Robertson, coach, Illinois
- Ron Waller, athlete, Delaware
- Harold "Red" Weir, official, Missouri
- Arthur Weiss, coach, Pennsylvania
- John Wooden, athlete, Indiana

1992

- Danny Ainge, athlete, Oregon
- Alice Barron, administrator, Colorado
- Edward Burns, coach, Massachusetts
- Joseph Cesari, coach, Pennsylvania
- Gene Davis, athlete, Montana
- Chris Evert, athlete, Florida
- George Gardner, official, Georgia
- Lloyd Gaskill, coach, Colorado
- Willard "Ike" Ikola, coach, Minnesota
- Victor Liske, official, New Jersey
- Sidney Moncrief, athlete, Arkansas
- Wallace O'Brien, coach, Alabama
- Jerry Seeman, official, Minnesota
- James Smiddy, coach, Tennessee
- Paul Warfield, athlete, Ohio

1993

- Jack Brown, official, North Dakota
- Dwight Church, coach, Idaho
- Brice Durbin, administrator, Kansas (NF)
- Theodore Federici, coach, Ohio
- Vi Goodnow, coach, Massachusetts
- Geri Grigsby, athlete, Kentucky
- William Kean, coach, Kentucky
- William "Shorty" Lawson, official, Texas
- Dallas Long, athlete, Arizona
- John Moore, coach, Missouri
- Jackie Robinson, athlete, California
- Bernie Saggau, administrator, Iowa
- William "Red" Schmitt, coach, Illinois

1994

- James Baggot, coach, Colorado
- Earl Campbell, athlete, Texas
- Bill Cummings, official, South Carolina
- Pat Donovan, athlete, Montana
- Tom Frederick, administrator, Illinois & Wisconsin (NF)
- Jeanne Eggart Helfer, athlete, Washington
- Jackson Horner, coach, Pennsylvania
- Phil Jackson, athlete, North Dakota
- Garnis Martin, coach, Kentucky
- Jack Ryan, coach, Ohio
- John Saunders, athlete, Ohio
- Dallas Shirley, official, District of Columbia
- Edna Tarbutton, coach, Louisiana
- Willie Varner, coach, South Carolina

1995

- Norma Bellamy, coach, Arizona
- Larry Bird, athlete, Indiana
- Russell Blunt, coach, North Carolina
- Carolyn Osborn Bowers, official, Ohio
- Lindy Callahan, administrator, Mississippi
- Earl "Dutch" Clark, athlete, Colorado
- Joseph Diminick, coach, Pennsylvania
- Terry Dischinger, athlete, Indiana
- Kaye Garms, official, Colorado
- Pat Haden, athlete, California
- Herb Meyer, coach, California
- Ann Meyers-Drysdale, athlete, California
- Pat Panek, coach, Colorado
- Mel Renfro, athlete, Oregon
- Douglas Toole, official, Utah

1996

- Ola Bundy, administrator, Illinois
- Madelyn Chiomento, coach, New Jersey
- Cris Collinsworth, athlete, Florida
- Edward "Ebbie" Dunn, coach, Missouri
- Archie Griffin, athlete, Ohio
- Dick Groat, athlete, Pennsylvania
- Bob Marcinek, official, Indiana
- Jayne Gibson-McHugh, athlete, Colorado
- Dan Pitts, coach, Georgia
- S. T. Roach, coach, Kentucky
- Roy Robinson, athlete, Montana
- Alvin Schalge, official, Colorado
- Jim Thompson, official, Florida
- Taft Watson, coach, South Carolina

1997

- Curley Culp, athlete, Arizona
- Lou Cvijanovich, coach, California
- Robert Hildebrand, official, Iowa
- Russ Kraai, coach, Iowa
- Dave Krider, other, Iowa
- Bill Krueger, coach, Texas
- Tommy McDonald, athlete, New Mexico
- Mary Pratt, other, Massachusetts
- Earl Quigley, coach, Alabama
- Billy Schrivner, official, Tennessee
- Cash Stone, coach, Washington
- Jerome Van Meter, coach, West Virginia
- Bill Walton, athlete, California
- Keith Williams, coach, Idaho

1998

- Bob Arnzen, coach, Ohio
- Bill Fanning, coach, Colorado
- Paul Giel, athlete, Minnesota
- Nelson Hartman, administrator, Kansas
- Randy Lewis, athlete, South Dakota
- James Mason, official, Alaska
- Bill Mayo, administrator, Arkansas
- Bob Miller, official, Texas
- John Piurek, coach, Connecticut
- Jill Sterkel, athlete, California
- John Stevenson, coach, California
- Jack Wells, coach, Missouri
- Sharon Wilch, administrator, Colorado

1999

- Dick Ault, official, Missouri
- Glenn Daniel, coach, Alabama
- Oliver Elders, coach, Arkansas
- Heather Farr, athlete, Arizona
- Rich Greeno, coach, South Dakota
- Doug Huff, other, West Virginia
- Sam Huff, athlete, West Virginia
- Laurice "Lo" Hunter, coach, Colorado
- Sam Owens, official, South Carolina
- Dick Rosetta, other, Utah
- Dick Schindler, administrator, North Dakota (NF)
- Ken Schreiber, coach, Indiana

2000

- Bill Belisle, coach, Rhode Island
- Al Burr, other, Missouri
- Larry Campbell, coach, Georgia
- Mario Donnangelo, official, Pennsylvania
- Dave Houle, coach, Utah
- Diane Laffey, coach, Michigan
- Sandra Meadows, coach, Texas
- Kevin McHale, athlete, Minnesota
- Robert Oldis, official, Iowa
- John Olson, administrator, Wisconsin
- Steve Prefontaine, athlete, Oregon
- John Roberts, administrator, Wisconsin
- Don Sparks, administrator, Missouri (NF)
- Gary Thompson, athlete, Iowa

2001

- Charles Adams, administrator, North Carolina
- Wilbur Crisp, other, New York
- Albert Flischel, official, Missouri
- Tanya Haave, athlete, Colorado
- Keith Jackson, athlete, Arkansas
- Rich Jordan, athlete, Michigan
- Colin Kapitan, official, South Dakota
- Bob Ladouceur, coach, California
- Charles Ruter, official, Kentucky
- Barbara Twardus, administrator, Washington

2002

- Gary Adams, coach, South Carolina
- Rob Conklin, administrator, Colorado
- Jim Desmarais, administrator, New Hampshire
- Teresa Edwards, athlete, Georgia
- Tim Heenan, official, California
- Karen Kuhn, administrator, Wisconsin
- Charlie Lee, official, New Jersey
- John Lowery, coach, West Virginia
- Lindy Remigino, coach, Connecticut
- Willie Richardson, athlete, Mississippi
- J. C. Watts, athlete, Oklahoma
- Larry Wilcoxen, official, Illinois

2003

- Pat Fragile, official, West Virginia
- Del Gab, official, North Dakota
- Marlyn Goldhammer, administrator, South Dakota
- Robert Hughes, coach, Texas
- James Hulsman, coach, New Mexico
- Everett Johnson, performing arts, Iowa
- Frank McClellan, coach, Arkansas
- Dorothy McIntyre, administrator, Minnesota
- Frank Sferra, performing arts, Colorado
- Susan True, administrator, Kansas (NF)
- Herschel Walker, athlete, Georgia

2004

- Claudia Dodson, administrator, Virginia
- Gerry Faust, coach, Ohio
- Ray Guy, athlete, Georgia
- Dick Katte, coach, Colorado
- Debbie Meyer, athlete, California
- Joe Newton, coach, Illinois
- John Smith, athlete, Oklahoma
- Dr. Thad Stanford, other, Oregon
- Joyce Walker, athlete, Washington
- Mike Webb, official, West Virginia
- Elbert "Lum" Wright, coach, Mississippi

2005

- Ty Detmer, athlete, Texas
- Sean Elliott, athlete, Arizona
- Bill Gentry, coach, New Mexico
- Earl Gillespie, administrator, Virginia
- Jerry Hall, official, Arkansas
- Chad Hennings, athlete, Iowa
- LaTaunya Pollard, athlete, Indiana
- Jerry Popp, coach, North Dakota
- Donus Roberts, performing arts, South Dakota
- Sandy Scott, administrator, New York
- Patty Sheehan, athlete, Nevada
- Betty Whitlock, performing arts, Mississippi
- Bob Wood, coach, Michigan

2006

- Terry Baker, athlete, Oregon
- Irving Black, coach, Connecticut
- Nancy Cole, coach, New York
- Rich Edwards, performing arts, Texas
- Lou Groza, athlete, Ohio
- Blaine Lindgren, athlete, Utah
- Paul Ostyn, official, Idaho
- Louis Stout, administrator, Kentucky
- Jon Sundvold, athlete, Missouri
- Wayne Taylor, administrator, Florida
- Duane Twait, coach, Iowa
- Peter Webb, official, Maine

2007

- John Bagonzi, coach, New Hampshire
- Lewie Benitz, coach, Wisconsin
- Clyde Duncan, athlete, Iowa
- Jane Hansen, official, New Jersey
- Rick Insell, coach, Tennessee
- Jim Johnson, athlete, Michigan
- Jim Plunkett, athlete, California
- Sam Short, official, Alabama
- Terry Steinbach, athlete, Minnesota
- Tim Stevens, other, North Carolina
- Charlie Wedemeyer, athlete, Hawaii
- Joan Wells, coach, Kansas

2008

- Jackie Brummer, athlete, New York
- Tim Carr, official, Utah
- Louise Crocco, coach, Florida
- Dick Deitz, official, Illinois
- James Drewry, coach, Mississippi
- Natasha Kaiser-Brown, athlete, Iowa
- Tom Kropp, athlete, Nebraska
- Jerry McGee, administrator, North Carolina
- Warren Mitchell, coach, Colorado
- Barbara Seng, performing arts, Minnesota
- Karen Smith, athlete, California
- Dewey Sullivan, coach, Oregon

2009

- Guy Anderson, coach, California
- Harry Breland, coach, Mississippi
- Billy Bye, athlete, Minnesota
- David Clyde, athlete, Texas
- Dick Dullaghan, coach, Indiana
- George Ford, official, Connecticut
- Bob Hurley, coach, New Jersey
- Catherine Lempesis, coach, South Carolina
- Dana Miroballi, athlete, Illinois
- Clair Muscaro, administrator, Ohio
- Ruth Rehn, administrator, South Dakota
- Himie Voxman, performing arts, Iowa

2010

- Willie Bradshaw, administrator, North Carolina
- Michael Carter, athlete, Texas
- Gary Christiansen, official, Iowa
- Janet Evans, athlete, California
- Alton "Red" Franklin, coach, Louisiana
- John Godina, athlete, Wyoming
- Suzy Favor Hamilton, athlete, Wisconsin
- Richard Magarian, coach, Rhode Island
- Katrina McClain Johnson, athlete, South Carolina
- Ed Pepple, coach, Washington
- Dr. Vito Perriello, other, Virginia
- George Welch, performing arts, Utah

2011

- Leta Andrews, coach, Texas
- Curt Bladt, coach, Iowa
- Emry Dilday, official, Missouri
- Randall McDaniel, athlete, Arizona
- Kevin McReynolds, athlete, Arkansas
- Kenny Monday, athlete, Oklahoma
- Billy Owens, athlete, Pennsylvania
- Larry Shaw, coach, West Virginia
- Pete Shock, coach, New Mexico
- Rick Tucci, official, Florida
- Brad Van Pelt, athlete, Michigan
- Dan Washburn, administrator, Alabama

2012

- Ronald Bradley, coach, Georgia
- Rod Harman, coach, Oregon
- Jan Heiteen, performing arts, Illinois
- Tracy Hill, athlete, Colorado
- Fred Hoiberg, athlete, Iowa
- Kevin Johnson, athlete, California
- Bob Kanaby, administrator, New Jersey
- Larry Luitjens, coach, South Dakota
- Catherine Neely, coach, Tennessee
- Truman Owens, official, South Carolina
- Pat Sullivan, athlete, Alabama
- Bob White, official, Maine

2013

- Ed Aston, coach, Connecticut
- Chauncey Billups, athlete, Colorado
- Ronnie Carter, administrator, Tennessee
- Harrison Dillard, athlete, Ohio
- Richard Floyd, performing arts, Texas
- Kristin Folkl Kaburakis, athlete, Missouri
- Jerry Kimmel, official, Kentucky
- Chuck Koeppen, coach, Indiana
- Chuck Lenahan, coach, New Hampshire
- Mike Messere, coach, New York
- Haig Nighohossian, official, Illinois
- Jim Tate, coach, Alabama
- Joe Theismann, athlete, New Jersey

2014

- Casey Blake, athlete, Iowa
- George Demetriou, official, Colorado
- Mike Devereaux, athlete, Wyoming
- Morgan Gilbert, coach, Arkansas
- Anfernee "Penny" Hardaway, athlete, Tennessee
- Katie Horstman, coach, Ohio
- Bob McDonald, coach, Minnesota
- Ozzie Newsome, athlete, Alabama
- Frank Pecora, athlete, Vermont
- Randy Pierce, performing arts, Missouri
- Suzy Powell-Roos, athlete, California
- Sheryl Solberg, administrator, North Dakota

2015

- Dave Barney, coach, New Mexico
- Cindy Brogdon, athlete, Georgia
- Mike Burton, performing arts, Washington
- Doug Chickering, administrator, Wisconsin
- J. T. Curtis, coach, Louisiana
- Rick Lorenz, coach, Oregon
- Nikki McCray-Penson, athlete, Tennessee
- Lincoln McIlravy, athlete, South Dakota
- Joe Pangrazio, official, Ohio
- Don Petranovich, coach, Arizona
- Charles "Corky" Rogers, coach, Florida
- Jackie Stiles, athlete, Kansas

2016

- Ken Beardslee, athlete, Michigan
- Pete Boudreaux, coach, Louisiana
- Marlin Briscoe, athlete, Nebraska
- Tim Flannery, administrator, Ohio (NF)
- Jack Holloway, coach, Delaware
- Joni Huntley, athlete, Oregon
- Peg Kopec, coach, Illinois
- Chuck Kyle, coach, Ohio
- Ennis Proctor, administrator, Mississippi
- Tom Southall, athlete, Colorado
- Steve Spurrier, athlete, Tennessee
- Eugene "Lefty" Wright, official, Minnesota

2017

- Russ Cozart, coach, Florida
- Joe Dial, athlete, Oklahoma
- Lisa Fernandez, athlete, California
- Bill Laude, official, Illinois
- Joe Lombard, coach, Texas
- Bobby Richardson, athlete, South Carolina
- Steve Shondell, coach, Indiana
- Bernie Walter, coach, Maryland
- Missy West, athlete, New York
- Jerry Winterton, coach, North Carolina
- Rick Wulkow, administrator, Iowa

2018

- Buddy Anderson, coach, Alabama
- Roger Barr, official, Iowa
- Miller Bugliari, coach, New Jersey
- Dick Fosbury, athlete, Oregon
- Dorothy Gaters, coach, Illinois
- Jeff Meister, coach, Hawaii
- Dick Neal, administrator, Massachusetts
- Bill O'Neil, coach, Vermont
- Tom Osborne, athlete, Nebraska
- Nicole Powell, athlete, Arizona
- Carrie Tollefson, athlete, Minnesota
- Bill Zurkey, performing arts, Ohio

2019 (NFHS Centennial)

- Seimone Augustus, athlete, Louisiana
- Damon Bailey, athlete, Indiana
- Dusty Baker, athlete, California
- Jerry Boatner, coach, Mississippi
- Derrick Brooks, athlete, Florida
- Tracey Fuchs, athlete, New York
- Bob Gardner, administrator, Indiana (NF)
- Joe Gilbert, coach, Oklahoma
- Ginny Honomichl, contributor, Kansas
- D. W. Rutledge, coach, Texas
- Ralph Stout, official, Tennessee
- C. W. Whitten, administrator, Illinois (NF)

2020 (induction postponed to 2021 due to pandemic)

- Tim Couch, athlete, Kentucky
- Karyn Bye-Dietz, athlete, Wisconsin
- Alex English, athlete, South Carolina
- Bill Farney, administrator, Texas
- Rickey Baker, coach, Arizona
- Charles Berry, coach, Arkansas
- Maicel (Malone) Green, athlete, Indiana
- Matt Holliday, athlete, Oklahoma
- Robert Littlefield, performing arts, North Dakota
- Dave Logan, athlete, Colorado
- Terry Michler, coach, Missouri
- Michele Smith, athlete, New Jersey

2022

- Notah Begay, athlete, New Mexico
- E. Wayne Cooley, administrator, Iowa
- Ray Crowe, coach, Indiana
- Ron Kordes, coach, Kentucky
- Susan McLain, performing arts, Oregon
- Becky Oakes, Missouri, (NF)
- Walter Payton, athlete, Mississippi
- Sanya Richards-Ross, athlete, Florida
- Jeff Risk, official, North Dakota
- John E. (Jack) Roberts, administrator, Michigan
- Lamar Rogers, coach, Tennessee
- Thurman Thomas, athlete, Texas

2023

- Carlos Boozer, athlete, Alaska
- Maranda Brownson, athlete, Oregon
- Sue Butz-Stavin, coach, Pennsylvania
- Barbara Campbell, coach, Tennessee
- Dave Carlsrud, administrator, North Dakota
- Tamika Catchings, athlete, Illinois
- Clarissa Chun, athlete, Hawaii
- Ted Ginn Sr., coach, Ohio
- Dave Stead, administrator, Minnesota
- Allan Trimble, coach, Oklahoma
- Bill Webb, performing arts, Minnesota
- Sister Lynn Winsor, coach, Arizona

2024

- Dot Ford Burrow, athlete, Mississippi
- Mike Colbrese, administrator, Washington (NF)
- David Gore, official, Oklahoma
- Marie Ishida, administrator, California (NF)
- Paula Kirkland, coach, South Carolina
- Joe Mauer, athlete, Minnesota
- Gary Rankin, coach, Tennessee
- Roy Snyder, coach, Pennsylvania
- Takeo Spikes, athlete, Georgia
- Ronald Vincent, coach, North Carolina
- Tyrone Wheatley, athlete, Michigan

2025

- Prince Amukamara, athlete, Arizona
- Jane Berry-Eddings, performing arts, Oregon
- Jim Ciccarello, coach, New Mexico
- Tim Dwight, athlete, Iowa
- Lloyd Hisaka, official, Hawaii
- Ron Laird, administrator, Wyoming
- Linda Lampkin, coach, Missouri
- Anna Maria Lopez, athlete, Oregon
- Phil Savitz, coach, South Carolina
- Caryn Schoff-Kovatch, athlete, New York
- Diane Wolf, other, Idaho
