= Rachel Findlay =

Native American woman of Virginia history

- Born: Rachel Findlay c. 1750; Powhatan County; Virginia Colony, British America
- Died: August 17, 1820

Rachel Findlay (born circa 1750 – died after August 17, 1820) (also spelled "Finley" or "Findley") was a Native American mixed race woman who was illegally enslaved for over fifty years and twice sued Virginia for her rightful freedom, successfully winning her case in 1820.

== Life ==
Rachel Findlay was born enslaved in the early 1750s in Virginia, in the area now known as Powhatan County.

Her mother was possibly of both Indian and African ancestry, and her maternal grandmother was named Chance, an illegally enslaved Indian woman from either the Catawba or Choctaw nation.

=== Freedom lawsuits ===
In the early 1770s, Findlay and her brother sued their enslaver Thomas Clay (the great-grandfather of politician Henry Clay) on the ground that they were illegally enslaved (the colony of Virginia had formally ended the legal practice of Indian slavery in 1705). Being a descendant of a Native American was one of the few circumstances under which enslaved Black persons could sue to be emancipated during this period.

In May 1773, the General Court of Virginia in Williamsburg ruled that Findlay and her brother were free, but before the court reached its verdict, the Clay family had preemptively sent Findlay and her daughter west and sold them to another enslaver, John Draper near Ingles Ferry. The Draper family enslaved Findlay and her daughter in Wythe County, Virginia for forty years.

Verdict, Rachel v. John Draper

"We of the Jury find that the plaintiff is free and not a slave, and we do assess her damages to one penny."

— Powhatan County Jury, May 13, 1820

In 1813, Rachel again filed suit, this time in the Wythe County courts, to obtain her freedom. The case was eventually transferred to Powhatan County and became a jury trial. Rachel's legal counsel faced the challenge of convincing the jury of twelve white men of Rachel's rightful freedom.

Rachel formally won her freedom on May 13, 1820, and was granted one penny in damages. Because of Virginia law, when Rachel received her freedom, all of her children, grandchildren, and great-grandchildren also became legally entitled to freedom (approximately forty-four persons in total).

== Death ==
Little is recorded about Rachel's life after the case, but she is believed to have died after August 17, 1820.

== Legacy and honors ==
The 2002 novel, Free in Chains, is a historical fiction account of Findlay's life and fight for her freedom.

In 2014, Rachel was posthumously honored as a Virginia Women in History inductee. One of her descendants, Robert Fitzgerald, accepted the award on her behalf saying, "Her life reflects the human spirit's need to be free and at all costs".
