= Lillie Fearnow =

American canning entrepreneur

Lillie Pearl Hovermale Fearnow
- Fearnow in 1955
- Born: August 19, 1881; Berkeley Springs, West Virginia
- Died: March 6, 1970 (aged 88)
- Known for: Mrs. Fearnow's Brunswick Stew

Lillie Pearl Hovermale Fearnow (August 19, 1881 – March 6, 1970) was an American canning entrepreneur known for creating Mrs. Fearnow's Brunswick Stew. Connoisseur magazine named the stew one of the 10 worthiest canned treats in America in 1988.

Fearnow's stew was a popular meal to serve for guests arriving from out of state because unreliable transportation meant cooking something that would stay warm until they arrived. She was frequently canning fruits and vegetables and winning awards at county and state fairs, winning over 40 State Fair ribbons. She began to make Brunswick stew using chicken and home grown vegetables and selling it on consignment at the Women's Exchange in Richmond. The family handled all the processing including killing and dressing the chickens and growing and picking the vegetables.

Her stew sold well locally, with demand to stock it at local department stores, and she began cooking more of it in batches at home with the help of her daughters-in-law, Finnella Fearnow and Norma Fearnow, and began shipping it nationwide. The stew was originally created from "onion, parsley, celery, tomatoes, chicken, potatoes, butter beans, salt, pepper, red pepper, sugar and okra."

In 1946 two of her sons—Herbert Clyde Fearnow and George Nelson Fearnow—created a cannery called Fearnow Brothers Cannery in Mechanicsville, Virginia to mass-produce the stew now known as Mrs. Fearnow's Home Made Chicken Brunswick Stew. Once the stew was mass-produced, the recipe changed somewhat, omitting okra which could discolor the stew, and eliminating the celery which could become bitter. The family would give out the recipe to local people and it was said that the local school cafeterias would make Mrs. Fearnow's recipe. The canning factory, originally only a 20 x 40 foot building, filled about 1,000 cans per day. The family later purchased a second farm and cannery which they called Hope Farm because "they hoped they wouldn't starve to death." They expended eight more times eventually occupying a space that was over 19,000 square feet. They diversified somewhat, making and selling other canned foods such as Mrs. Fearnow's Black-eyed Peas and Stewed Tomatoes.

The company continued to be owned by Fearnow's children and grandchildren until it was sold to Castleberry/Snow's Brands in 1999. Bumble Bee Foods purchased Castleberry/Snow Brands in December 2005, and Bost Distributing Company bought the Mrs. Fearnow's Brunswick Stew brand from Bumble Bee in 2007 and it is still being distributed in 2021.

== Personal life ==
Fearnow was born in Berkeley Springs, West Virginia to Joseph Cassidy Hovermale and Catherine Ruppenthall Hovermale. Her parents were farmers. She married Brady Goshen Fearnow, a railroad worker, on August 20, 1905, and the couple had five children, four sons and one daughter. They moved to Hanover County, Virginia in 1919. Fearnow worked at the family cannery until her death from a stroke on March 6, 1970. She is buried in Forest Lawn Cemetery in Henrico County.
