= Thelma Young Gordon =

American public official

Secretary of the Commonwealth of Virginia
- In office July 1947 – September 1952
- Governor: William M. Tuck. John S. Battle
- Succeeded by: Martha Bell Conway

Personal details
- Died: 1974

Thelma Young Gordon (died 1974) was an American public servant who was the Secretary of the Commonwealth of Virginia from July 1947 to September 1952. She was the first woman to serve in the position.

== Career ==
In 1921, Gordon joined the staff of the Secretary of the Commonwealth as a secretary. On June 1, 1945, she became acting Secretary of the Commonwealth until she was succeeded by Jesse Dillon in September 1945. In July 1947, Gordon was appointed as Secretary of the Commonwealth by Governor William M. Tuck, becoming the first woman appointed to serve in the position.

In February 1950, Gordon was re-appointed to the office by Governor John S. Battle. In September 1952, Gordon retired and was succeeded as Secretary of the Commonwealth by Martha Bell Conway.

== Personal life ==
Gordon was married. In 1974, she died.
