= Ann Cotton (colonial Virginian) =

Colonial Virginian

An account of our late troubles in Virginia

Ann Cotton (fl. 1650s–1670s) was the author of a personal account of Bacon's Rebellion. Her birth and death dates are unknown. She was married to John Cotton (d. late 1683). The couple owned a plantation in Queen's Creek, Virginia. Her account of Bacon's Rebellion is in the form of a letter written in 1676 and published in its original form in 1804 in the Richmond Enquirer under the title An account of our late troubles in Virginia. A poem, "Bacon's Epitaph, Made by His Man" and a follow-up "Upon the Death of G.B." [General Bacon], are attributed to Ann or her husband. They are considered the first notable English poems composed in Virginia.

In 2018 the Virginia Capitol Foundation announced that Cotton's name would be on the Virginia Women's Monument's glass Wall of Honor.
