= Ruth Harvey Charity =

Activist

- Born: April 18, 1924; Danville, Virginia
- Died: April 26, 1996 (aged 72); Greenbelt, Maryland
- Other name: Ruth LaCountess Harvey Wood Charity
- Occupation: Civil rights attorney

Ruth LaCountess Harvey Wood Charity (/h’a:vi/, HAHR-vee; April 18, 1924 – April 26, 1996) was an African American civil rights activist and defense attorney in Danville. In 1970, she became the first African American woman to sit on the Danville city council. She was one of four Virginia members of the Democratic National Committee.

== Early life and education ==
Charity was born in Danville, Virginia, on April 18, 1924, to Charles Clifton Harvey (1890–1966), a Baptist minister, and Annie Elizabeth Lovelace Harvey (January 3, 1901 – June 26, 1975), a teacher.

She began her school years in a racially segregated Danville public school. She later moved to North Carolina and graduated from Palmer Memorial Institute, a high school that specialized in leadership training for African-American women and received her bachelor's degree and law degree from Howard University in 1947.

== Career ==
Ruth Harvey was accepted to the Virginia bar in 1951 after working in the government for one year.

Charity was the president of Howard University's NAACP chapter in 1944, a year in which she led sit ins at segregated restaurants in Washington, D.C. In 1960, she led several protests in Danville's public libraries and parks.

In 1963 the Danville Movement faced legal hurdles after Judge Archibald Murphey issued an injunction banning public protest, which lead to violence against peaceful protestors by the Danville Police Department. As a result of this, the City Council passed additional ordinances supporting the injunction and a grand jury indicted leaders of the protests under an Jim Crow laws, which made it a felony to incite the black population to insurrection against whites, resulting in more than 600 arrests. Martin Luther King Jr. visited Danville on July 11, 1963, to support the demonstrators of the movement. With a small group of local and national attorneys, Charity, Arthur Kinoy, Len Holt and William Kunstler defended the protestors against these charges. In 1966, after a recess, the trials continued as Aiken gave contempt citations to Charity and others who criticized his courtroom conduct, which was described as "heavy-handed".

Following Aiken's death, in 1973 the Virginia Supreme Court of Appeals over turned more than 200 convictions, primarily due to the work of Ruth Harvey Charity.

In 1967, Ruth Harvey ran for a seat in the Virginia House of Delegates and lost the primary vote. She was also unsuccessful with the election in the House of Representatives as an independent candidate. In 1969, she was recommended by the state civil rights leader for an appointment in the Virginia Supreme Court of Appeals. In 1970, Harvey won enough support from the voters and came in fourth out of sixteen candidates for seat in the city council. She became the first black woman to be elected to the city council in Danville. She served for two-four years term from 1972 to 1980, as one of the Democratic National Committee in Virginia.

== Conviction ==
In 1984 Charity was prosecuted for embezzling more than $51,000 from two clients. She was sentenced to 8 years incarceration, however it was shortened on the condition that she serve 3 years, complete 400 hours of community service and return the stolen funds.

Charity's voting rights were restored by Governor Lawrence Douglas Wilder in 1990.

== Personal life ==
Charity married, Ronald Karl Charity, who ran her July 1967 campaign.

Charity died on April 26, 1996, in Washington, D.C., and was buried in Oak Hill Cemetery, Danville.
