= A Summary View of the Rights of British America =

1774 document written by Thomas Jefferson

A Summary View of the Rights of British America was a tract written by Thomas Jefferson in 1774, before the United States Declaration of Independence, in which he laid out for delegates to the First Continental Congress a set of grievances against King George III, especially against King George III and the Parliament of Great Britain's response to the Boston Tea Party. Jefferson declares that Parliament never had the right to govern the Thirteen Colonies because the colonies were founded independently from British rule.

== History ==
In this work, Jefferson argued that allodial title, not feudal title, was held to American lands, and that the people did not owe fees and rents to the British Crown as compensation for that land.

Despite being a life-long slave owner, Jefferson included a strong condemnation of slavery in the tract, writing "The abolition of domestic slavery is the great object of desire in those colonies, where it was unhappily introduced in their infant state. But previous to the enfranchisement of the slaves we have, it is necessary to exclude all further importations from Africa; yet our repeated attempts to effect this by prohibitions, and by imposing duties which might amount to a prohibition, have been hitherto defeated by his majesty's negative: Thus preferring the immediate advantages of a few African corsairs to the lasting interests of the American states, and to the rights of human nature, deeply wounded by this infamous practice."

The work was presented to, and debated by, the First Continental Congress, which convened in the colonial era capital of Philadelphia. Jefferson was not present for the First Continental Congress, but later was a delegate to the Second Continental Congress, during which he was the primary author of the Declaration of Independence, which was unanimously adopted by its 56 delegates on July 4, 1776, and served to both formalize and escalate the American Revolutionary War.

During the First Continental Congress, a more moderate decision than that proposed by Jefferson was adopted. Despite this moderation of his proposals, Jefferson's friends published Summary in pamphlet form, and it was subsequently distributed throughout London, New York, and Philadelphia. Research states that the document "helped establish Jefferson's reputation as a skillful, if radical, political writer."
