= Rebecca Lovenstein =

American lawyer (1888–1971)

- Born: Rebecca Pearl Greenberg; May 25, 1888; Vilnius, Russian Empire
- Died: February 10, 1971 (aged 82); New York, United States
- Education: Duke University

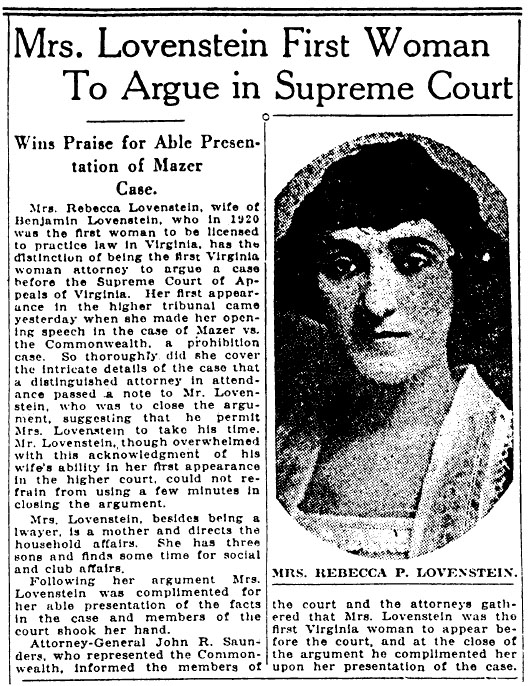
Article about Lovenstein in Richmond Times-Dispatch on January 8, 1925

Rebecca Pearl Lovenstein (1888–1971) was one of the first two women to pass the written bar exam in the state of Virginia in 1920.

== Biography ==
Lovenstein née Greenberg was born on May 25, 1888, in Vilnius, Russian Empire. Her family emigrated to the United States in the 1890s. They lived in Durham, North Carolina. Lovenstein attended Duke University for two years. In 1907, she married a trial lawyer, Benjamin Lovenstein, with whom she had three children. The family settled in Richmond, Virginia, and Lovenstein took law courses at night.

In 1920, after the passage of the 19th Amendment to the United States Constitution, the state of Virginia began allowing women to practice law. The same year, Lovenstein and Carrie M. Gregory passed the written bar exam and earned their licenses to practice law. Lovenstein went on to practice law with her husband. In 1925, Lovenstein became the first woman to argue a case before the Supreme Court of Virginia.

She died on February 10, 1971, in New York. In 2018, the Virginia Capitol Foundation announced that Lovenstein's name would be on the Virginia Women's Monument's glass Wall of Honor.
