= Odessa Pittard Bailey =

Civic leader and judge(1906-1994)

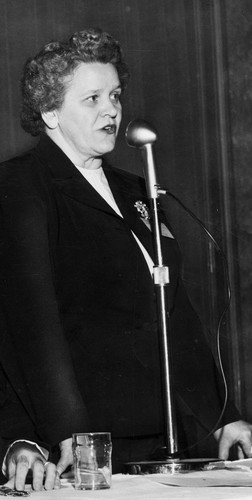
Odessa Pittard Bailey Addressing a Conference

Odessa Pittard Bailey (1906–1994) was a civic leader and judge in Virginia. She was appointed to the Roanoke Juvenile and Domestic Relations Court in 1944, making her the first woman in Virginia to hold a judicial post higher than justice of the peace or county trial justice. Bailey co-founded the Virginia Council of Juvenile Court Judges and served as its president from 1947 to 1948. She served as president of the Virginia Federation of Women’s Clubs.
