= Edward Waters (colonist) =

English colonist in Bermuda and Virginia in the 1600s

Commander Edward Waters Commissioner of Elizabeth City
- Born: 1585; Willian, Hertfordshire, Kingdom of England
- Died: 1630 (aged 45–46); Great Hormead, Hertfordshire
- Other names: /ref> Lt. Waters, Capt. Waters, Watters [sic]
- Known for: Sea Venture sailor and castaway, burgess, commissioner

House of Burgesses
- Incumbent
- Assumed office 1625, 1628
- Preceded by: unknown
- Succeeded by: unknown
- Spouse: Grace O'Neil (m. 1620)

Edward Waters (b. 1585 -- d. c. 1630) was an English-born adventurer in Bermuda and Colony of Virginia in the early 1600s. He is the namesake of Waters Creek in Newport News, Virginia.

== Adventures in Bermuda ==
Described as a lieutenant and a "sayler" in 1610, Edward Waters (sometimes documented as "Robert") first traveled to the Colony of Virginia in 1609 aboard the Sea Venture of the "third supply". The Sea Venture encountered a tropical storm and was thrown off course. The passengers wrecked east of the uninhabited (and later named) St. George's Island in July, 1609.

After surviving the shipwreck, about 150 castaways aimed to self-rescue by building new a ship from salvage and native materials. Among other incidents, Waters conspired with a shipmate Christopher Carter to prevent the colonists from leaving Bermuda to Virginia.

Waters quarreled with another sailor, Edward Samuell, which led to a mortal attack with a shovel. Accounts differ, but Waters was to be executed by either hanging or gunshot at sundown. Waters was tied to a tree, but was either released out of the bonds (by shipmates) or cut himself out. He escaped into the wild. When the remainder of the castaways left for Virginia on two built ships, Edward Waters stayed behind with Christopher Carter. In 1610, Edward Waters and Carter were residing on in an inner harbour island later named Smith's Island.

When George Somers returned to Bermuda in 1610 to gather supplies for Jamestown, Virginia, sailor Edward Chard joined the Smith's Island castaways. Later dubbed the "Three Kings of Bermuda", Waters, Carter, and Chard built cabins, constructed a shallop, fished the waters, and farmed the land from 1610 to 1612.

Some time between 1610 and 1612, the castaways discovered a large piece of ambergris. Waters quarreled with Chard over ownership, almost leading to a duel. On July 11, 1612, the Plough arrived with 50 to 60 permanent colonists from the newly formed Somers Isles Company. The three conspired to smuggle it aboard the Plough to sell the ambergris in Europe, but were caught by the Governor Richard Moore. Waters was later pardoned from the incident.

In 1614, Waters was appointed by Governor Moore to a governing council in the Somers Isles, but left with others for supplies some time that year. Edward Waters and shipmates were blown off course from the West Indies to the Canary Islands, where they encountered a Portuguese ship they seized as a prize. Waters' ship wrecked on a desert island in the West Indies (becoming a castaway a second time). He was rescued eventually by an English pirate, and sailed to England. Waters returned to Bermuda in 1617.

== Settling in Virginia ==
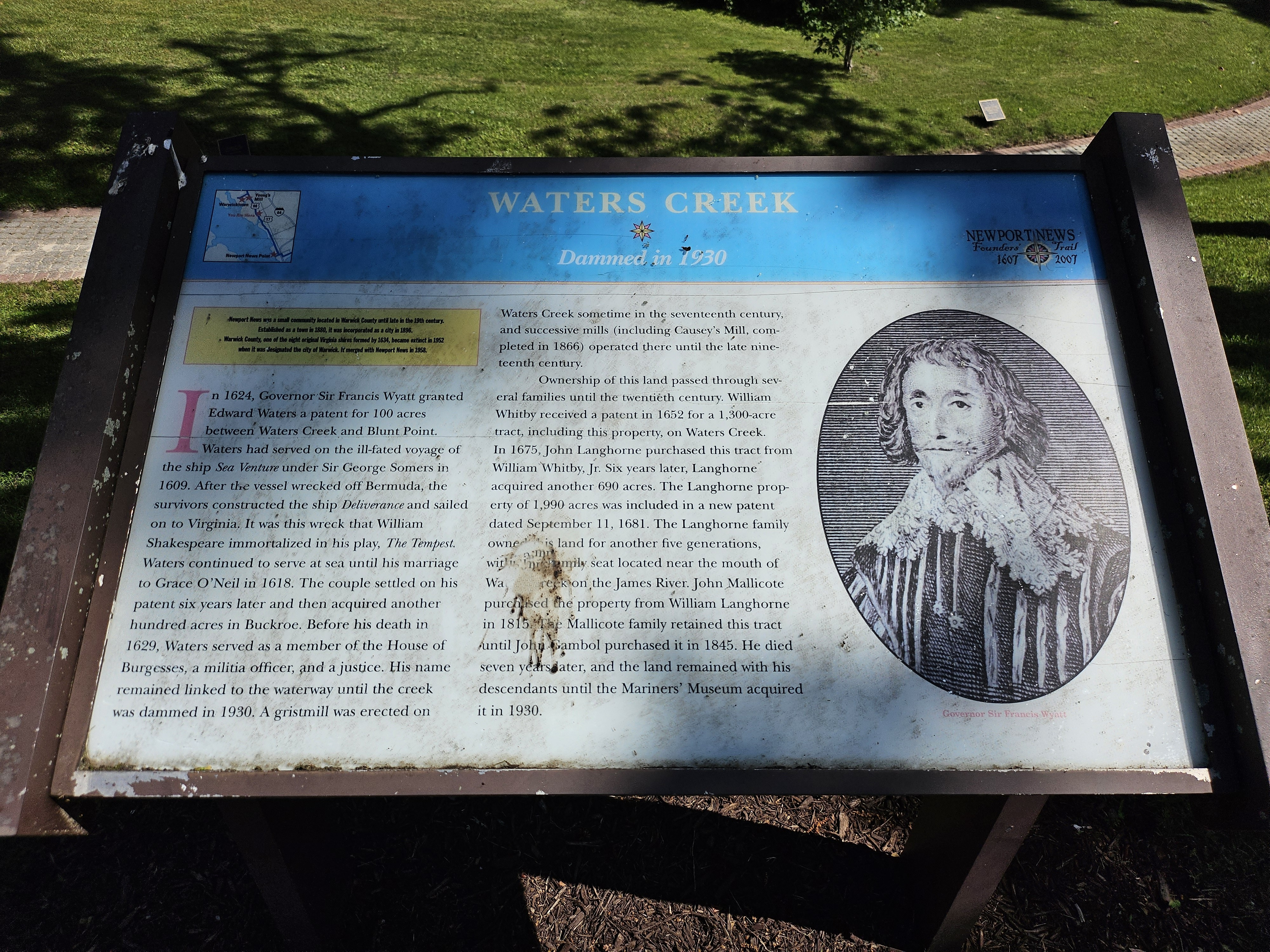
Waters Creek historical marker

On a return from a supply mission to Virginia, Waters and shipmates encountered a storm and turned back to the Chesapeake. Edward Waters would then take up residence in Virginia. Records indicate that some time before 1622, Waters married Grace O'Neil (b. 1603), who arrived on the ship Diana, c. 1619. Waters and Grace had two servants named Edward Bryan and William Arnall.

During the Indian attacks of 1622, Edward and his wife were imprisoned by the Nansemond people, near the Nansemond River. They were eventually able to escape to Kecoughtan by boat.

In 1624, Governor Francis Wyatt granted Waters 100 acres (0.40 km^{2}) near Blunt Poynt. As he and his wife were the first English to settle the area, it became Waters Creek (sometimes labeled Watts Creek).

Edward was a burgess for the General Assembly in 1625. In 1628, he was appointed a Commander and a Commissioner of Elizabeth City.

Waters died in either 1628 or 1630. He had two children: Margaret and William. William Waters born in Virginia before 1624, was a burgess of Northampton county in 1654, 1659, and 1660.

== See also ==
- Skirmish at Waters Creek
- The Mariners' Lake
- Causey's Mill
