= Mariners' Museum and Park =

Maritime museum in Virginia

The Mariners' Museum and Park

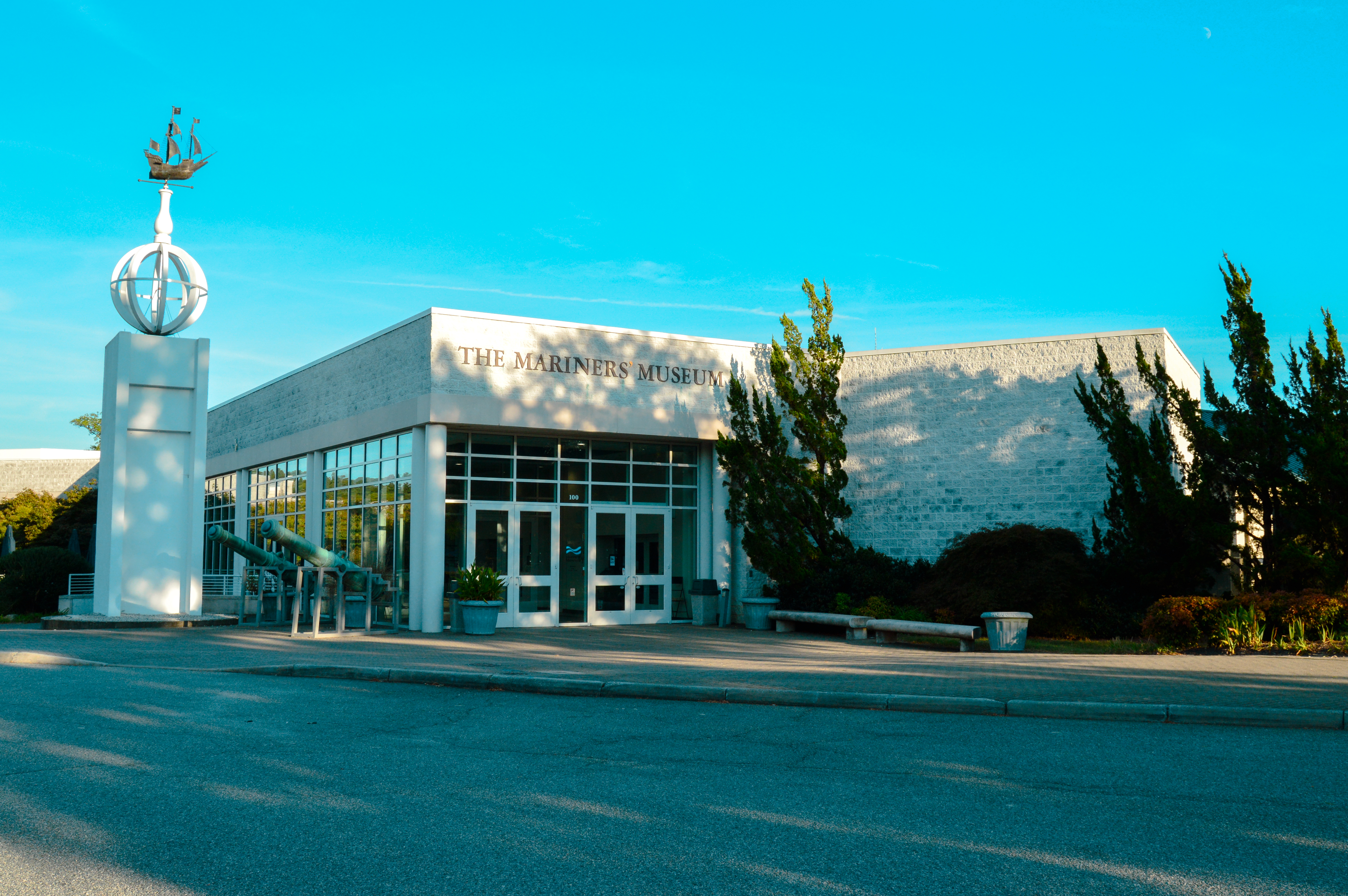
- The Mariners' Museum main entrance in Newport News, Virginia.
- Established: 1930
- Location: 100 Museum Drive; Newport News, Virginia; United States
- Coordinates: 37.0550°N 76.4878°W
- Type: Maritime
- Website: www.marinersmuseum.org

The Mariners' Museum and Park is located in Newport News, Virginia, United States. Designated as America's National Maritime Museum by Congress, it is one of the largest maritime museums in North America. The Mariners' Museum Library contains the largest maritime history collection in the Western Hemisphere.

== History ==
The museum was founded in 1930 by Archer Milton Huntington, son of Collis P. Huntington, a railroad builder who brought the Chesapeake and Ohio Railway to Warwick County, Virginia, and who founded the City of Newport News, its coal export facilities, and Newport News Shipbuilding in the late 19th century.

Huntington and his wife Anna acquired 800 acres (320 ha) of land that now holds 90,000 square feet (8,400 m^{2}) of exhibition galleries, a research library, a 167-acre (68 ha) lake, a five-mile shoreline trail with 14 bridges, and over 35,000 maritime artifacts from around the world. After the land acquisition took place, the first two years were devoted to creating and improving a natural park and constructing a dam to create The Mariners' Lake. (Note: The Board of Trustees had originally named the lake "Lake Maury", after nineteenth-century Virginia oceanographer Commodore Matthew Fontaine Maury.)

== Artifacts, paintings, models ==
The museum's collection totals approximately 32,000 artifacts, equally divided between works of art and three-dimensional objects. The scope of the collection is international and includes miniature ship models, scrimshaw, maritime paintings, decorative arts, carved figureheads, working steam engines, and the world's only known Kratz-built steam calliope. The museum holds important collections of paintings and drawings by marine artists James Bard and Antonio Jacobsen.

The museum offers educational programs for all ages and a large research library and archives, as well as publications and Internet resources for teachers. The largest boat in its collection is the Oracle Team USA 17, the yacht that won the 2013 America's Cup.

== Collection highlights ==
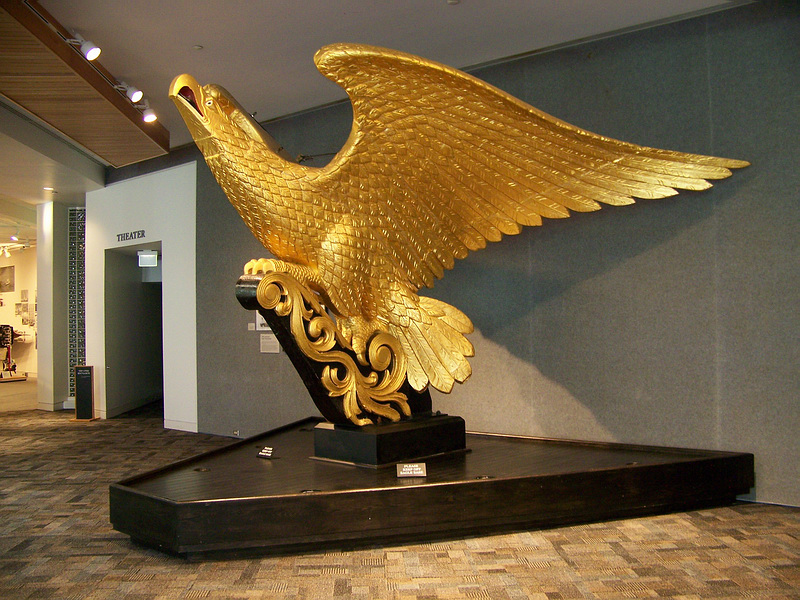
USS Lancaster Eagle, John Haley Bellamy

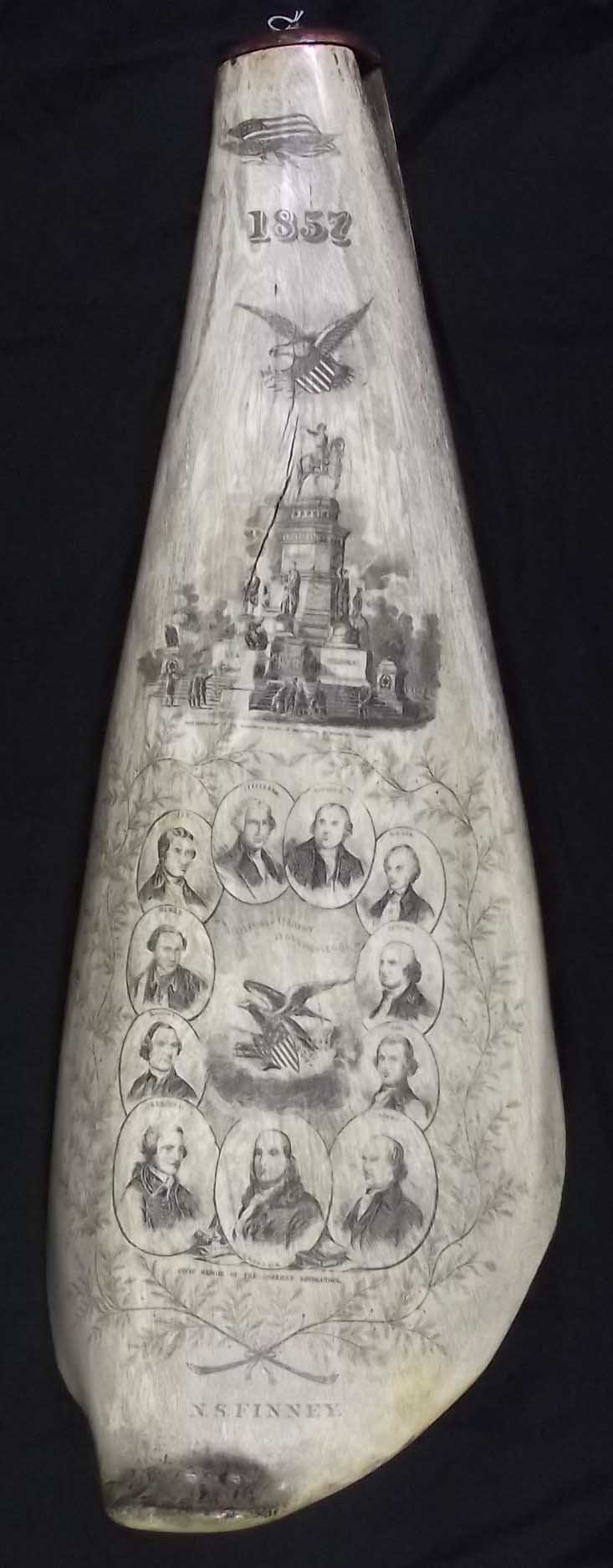
Scrimshaw panbone, 1857, Civil Heroes of the American Revolution and Washington Monument in Richmond, Virginia, created by Nathaniel S. Finney

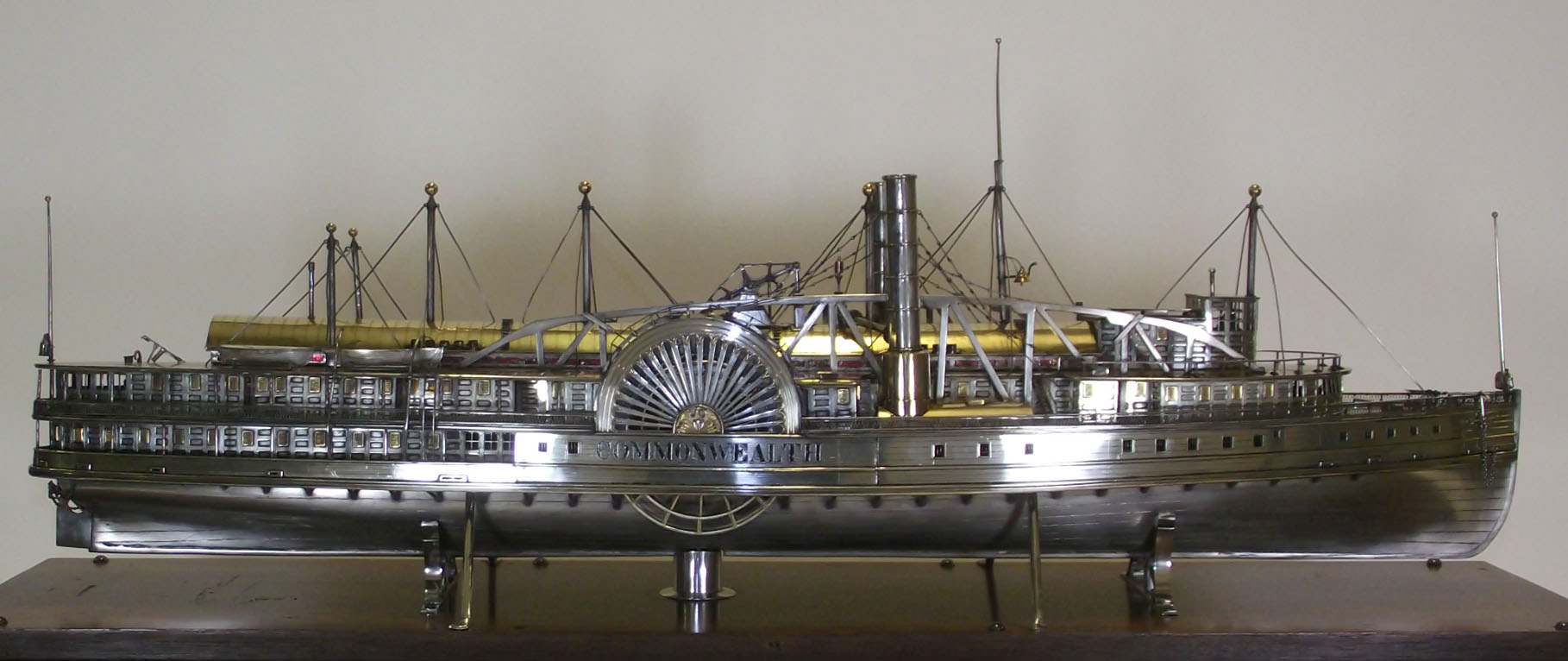
Model of the Steamboat Commonwealth crafted by John Dean Benton, c. 1864

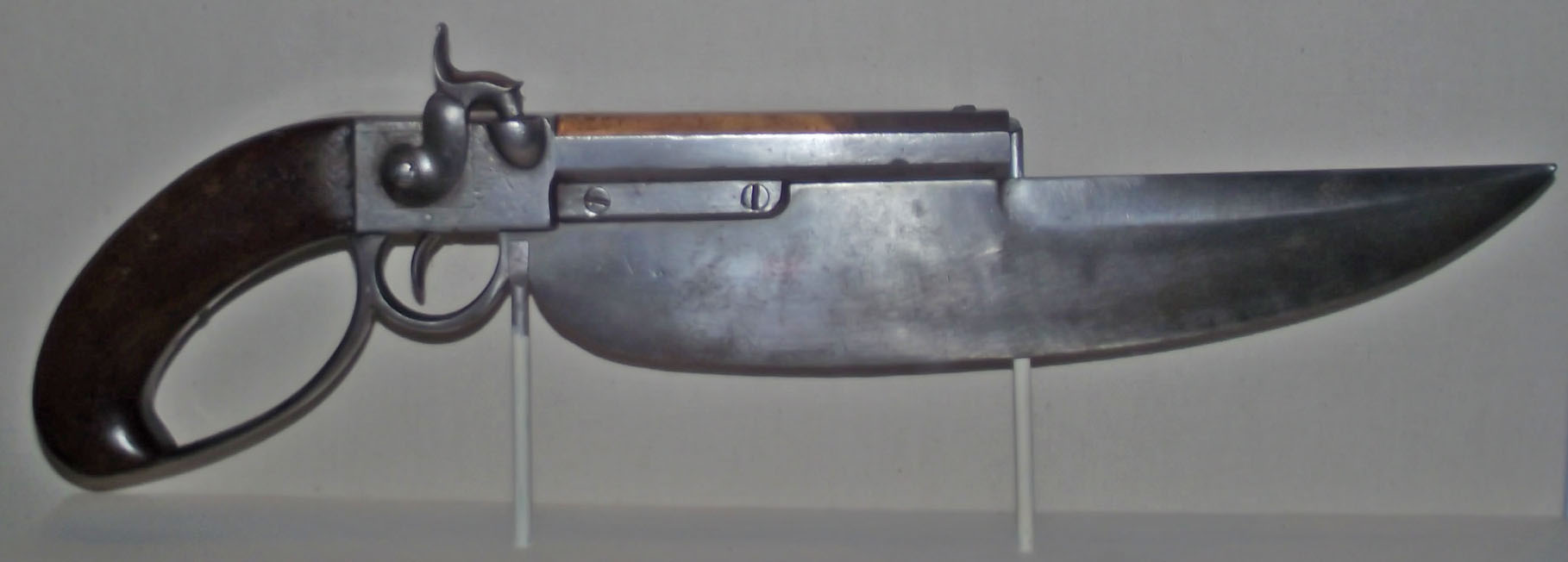
Elgin Cutlass pistol

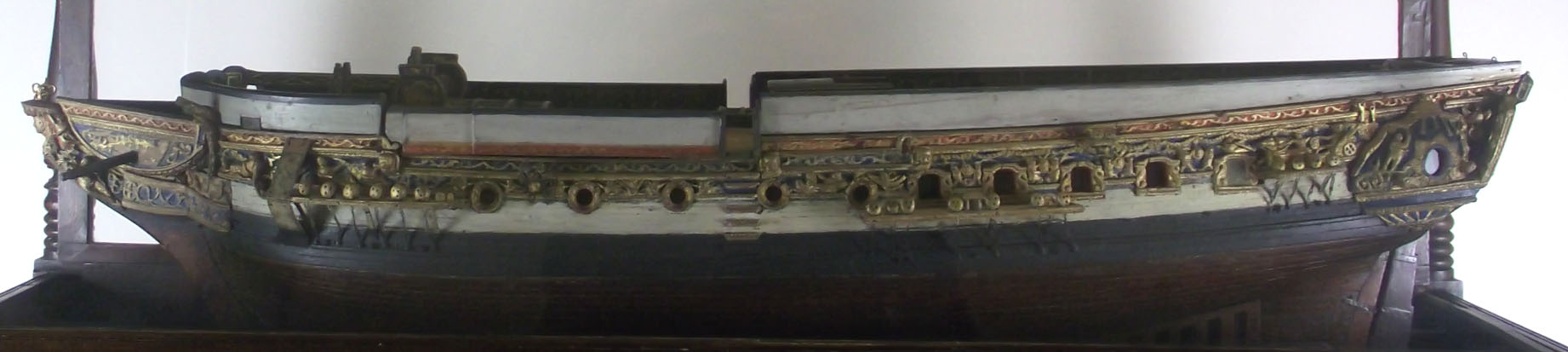
Intricate and lavish model, c. 1804, of HMS Royal Sovereign, Royal Yacht of King George III

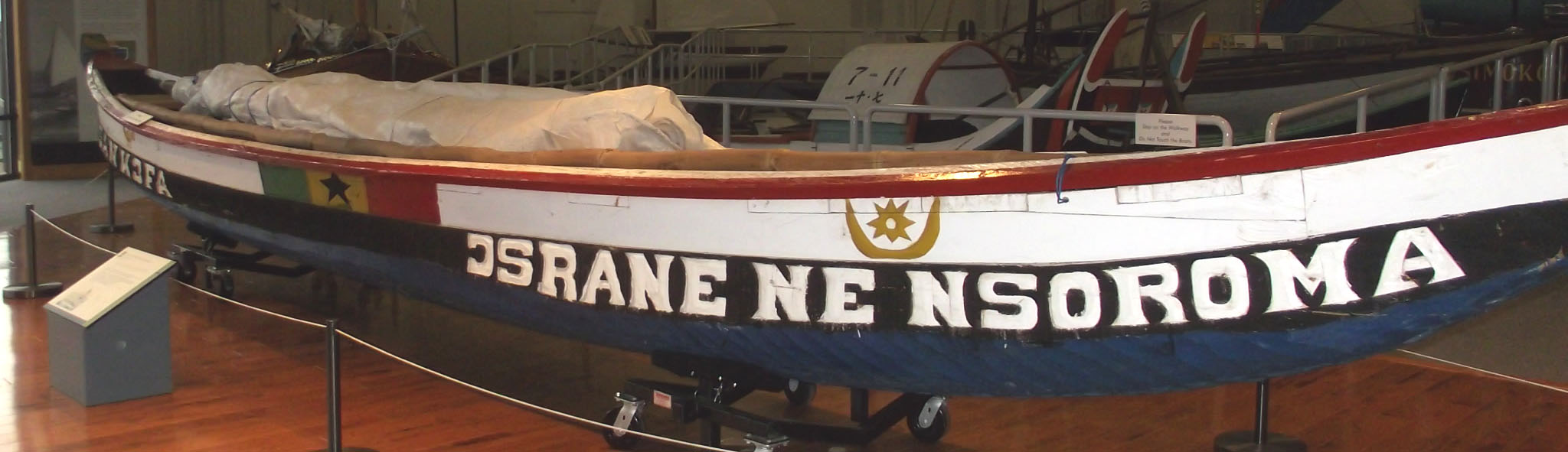
Ghana dugout canoe, ahima, 2004

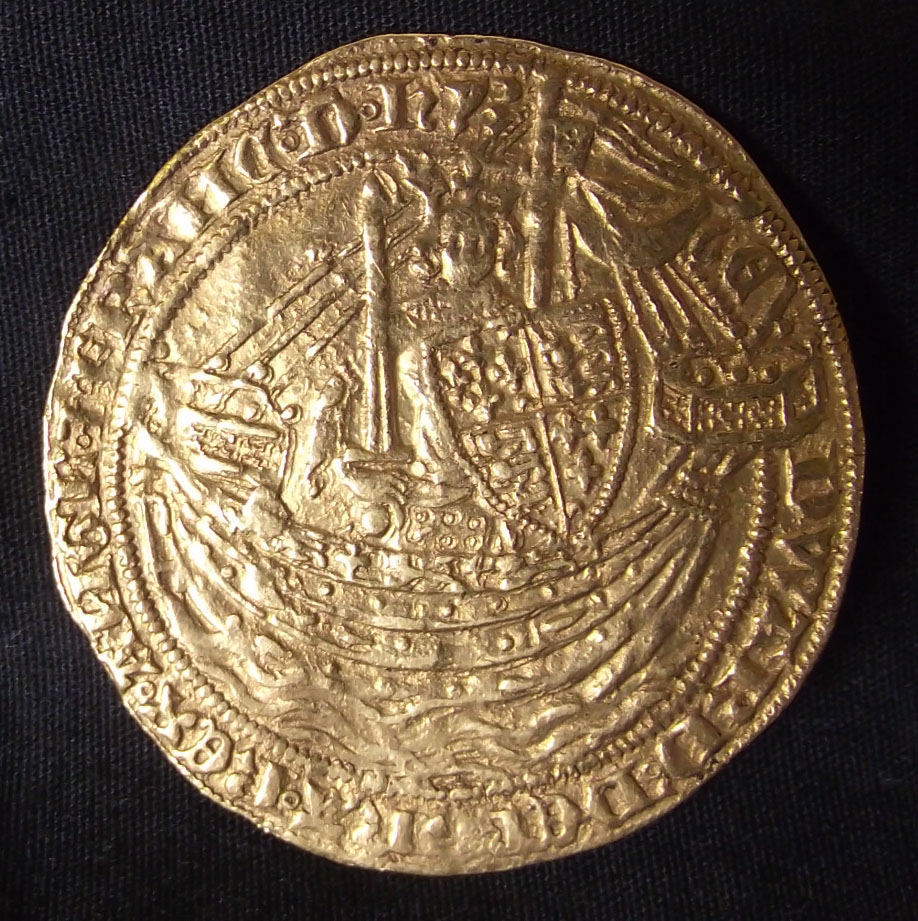
Gold coin, c. 1361–1369, commemorating the Battle of Sluys

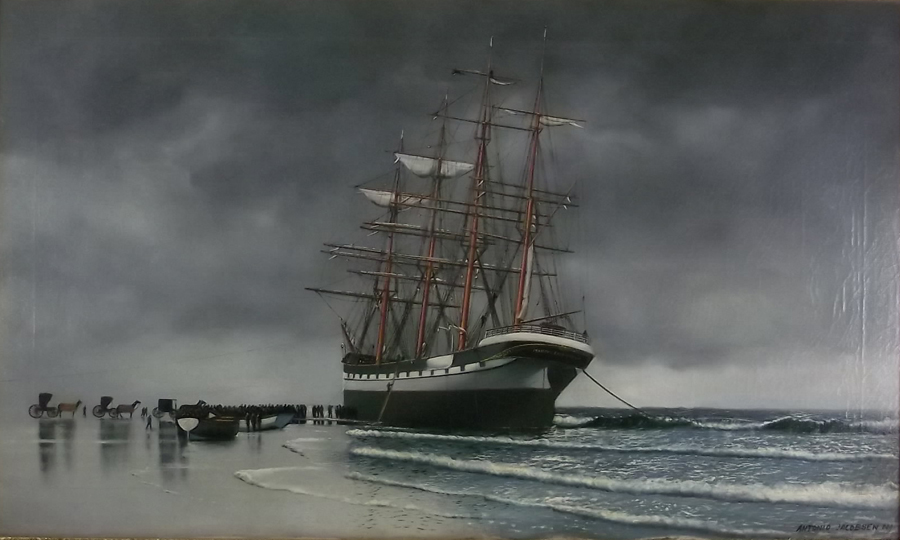
County of Edinburgh on the Beach, c. 1902, by Antonio Jacobsen

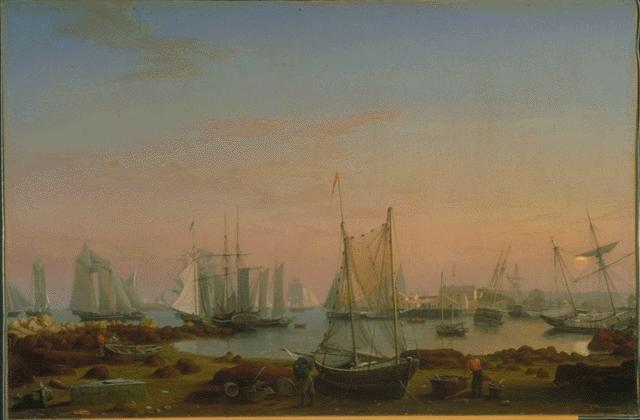
Gloucester Inner Harbor, 1850, by Fitz Henry Lane

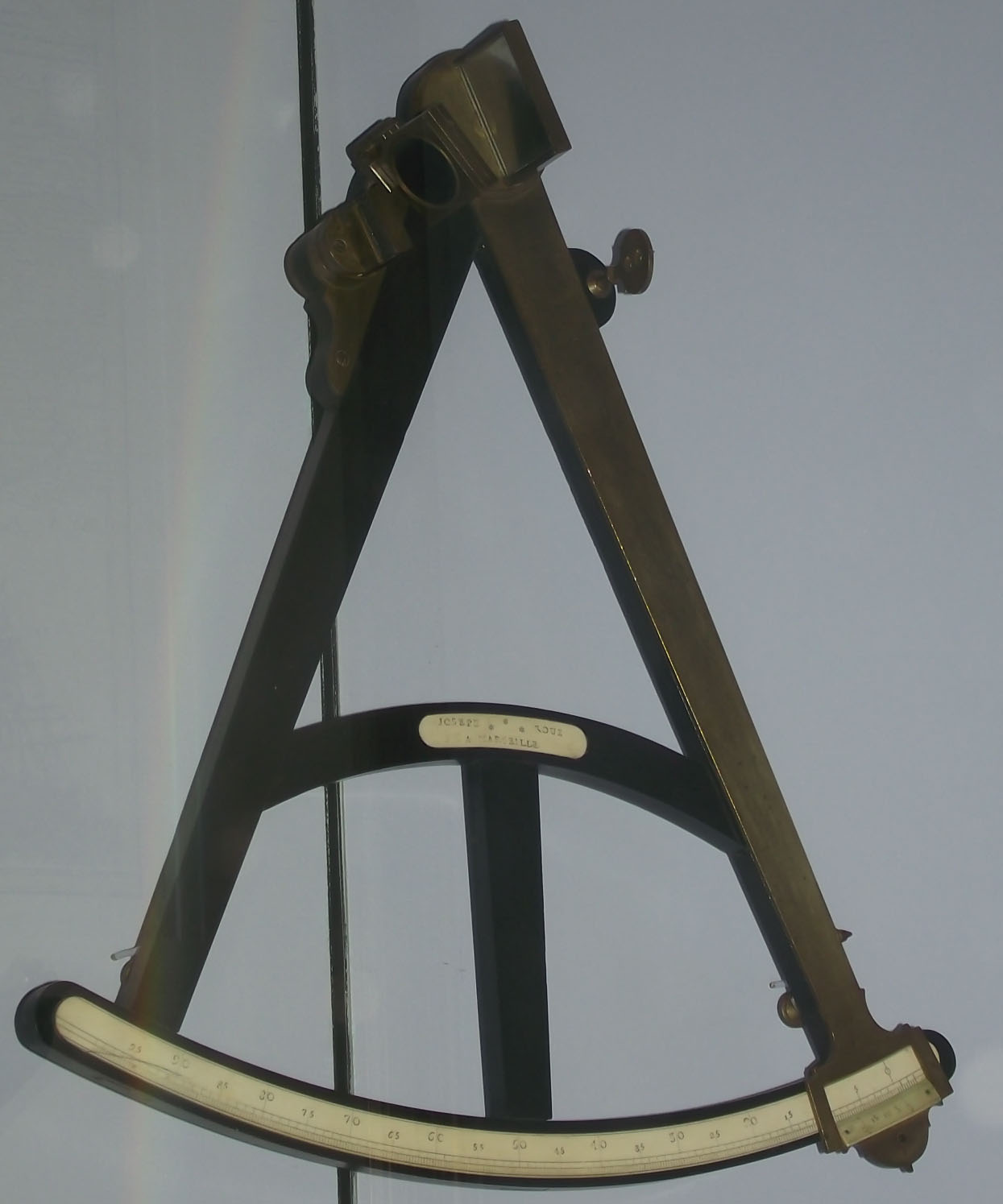
Octant made by Joseph Roux c. 1780

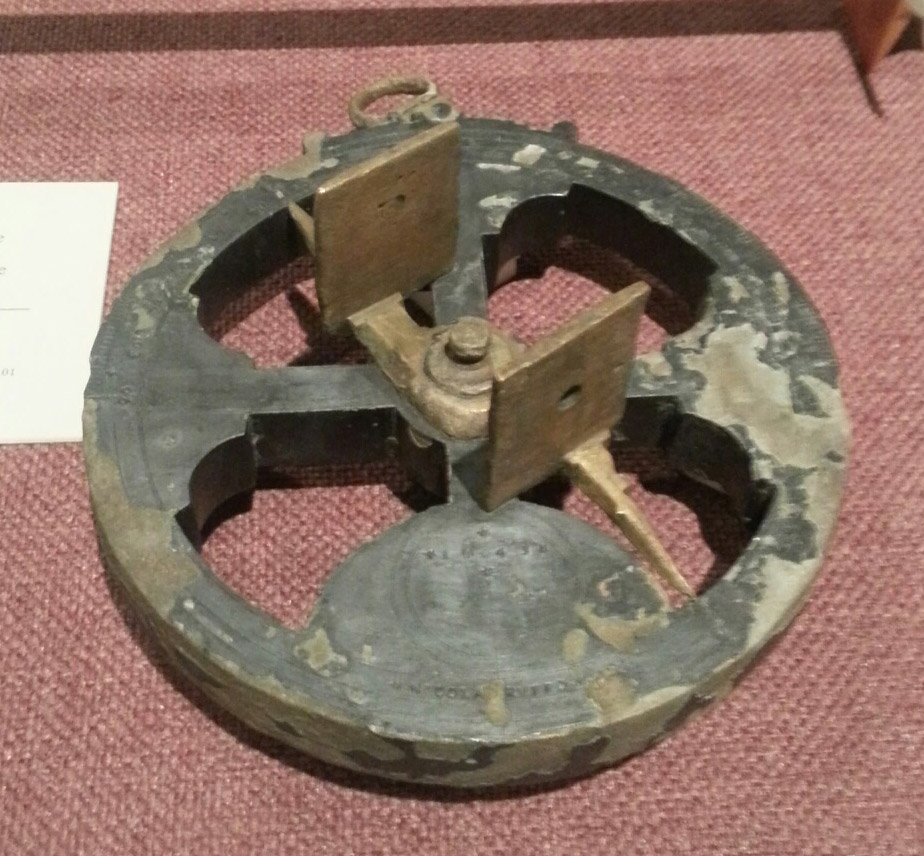
silver-plated mariner's astrolabe, 1645, made by Nicolao Ruffo

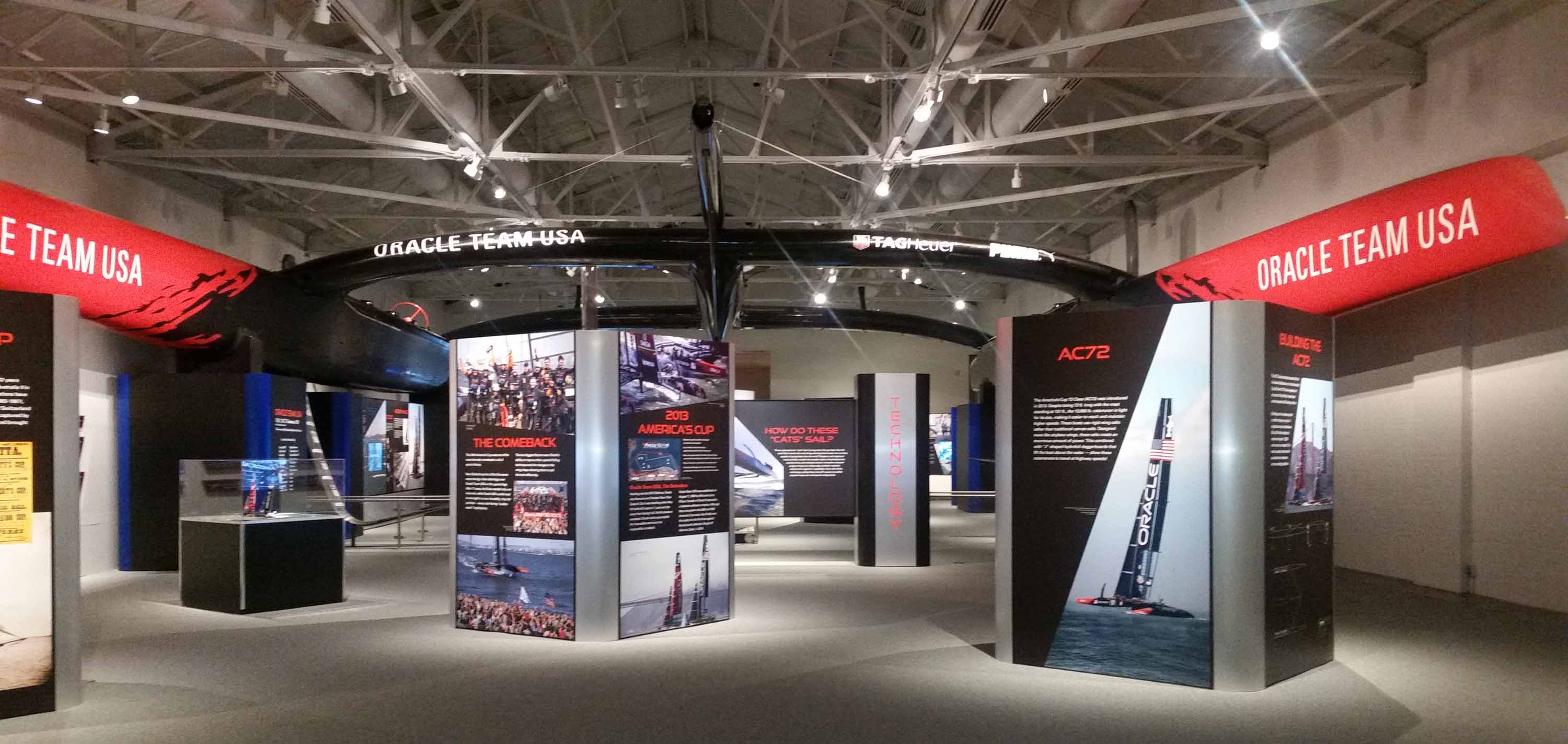
Oracle Team USA's AC72, winner of the 2013 America's Cup

A casting of Alexander Stirling Calder's Statue of Leif Erikson.

== USS Monitor Center ==
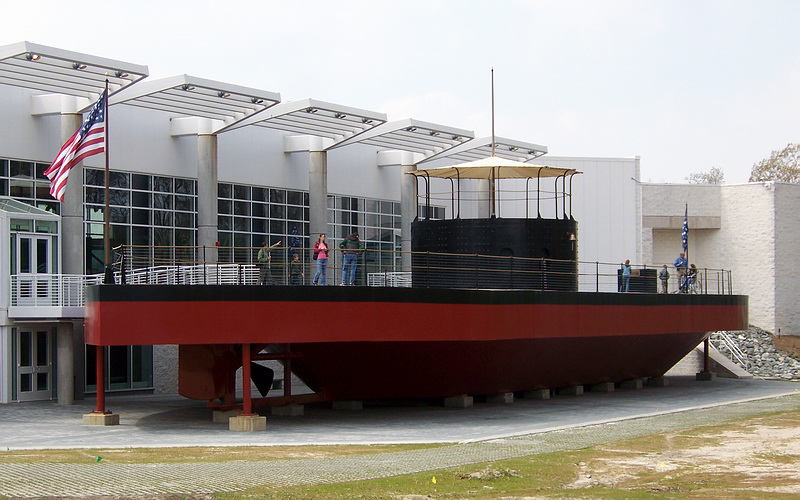
New replica of USS Monitor, dedicated March 9th, 2007

The Mariners' Museum is home to the USS Monitor Center. The ironclad Monitor was made famous in the Battle of Hampton Roads in 1862 during the American Civil War, and its remains were located on the floor of the Atlantic Ocean about 16 miles southeast of Cape Hatteras, North Carolina. The wreck site was designated as the United States' first national marine sanctuary, the only one of the 13 national marine sanctuaries created to protect a cultural resource rather than a natural resource or a mix of natural and cultural resources.

Many artifacts from Monitor have been brought to the museum, including her turret, propeller, anchor, engine, and some personal effects of the crew. For several years, they were conserved in special tanks to stabilize the metal. The USS Monitor Center officially opened on March 9, 2007, and displays include a full-scale replica, the original recovered turret, and many artifacts and related items. Current efforts are focused on restoring the engine.

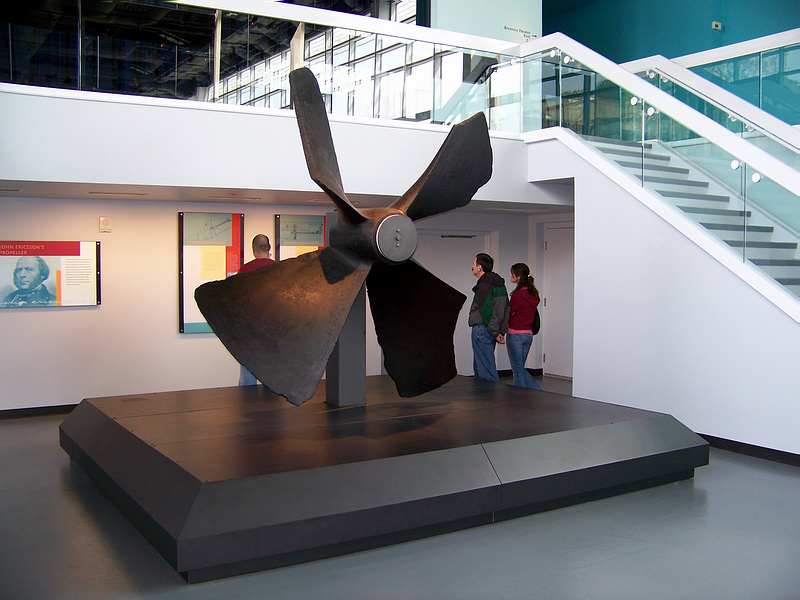
Propeller from USS Monitor

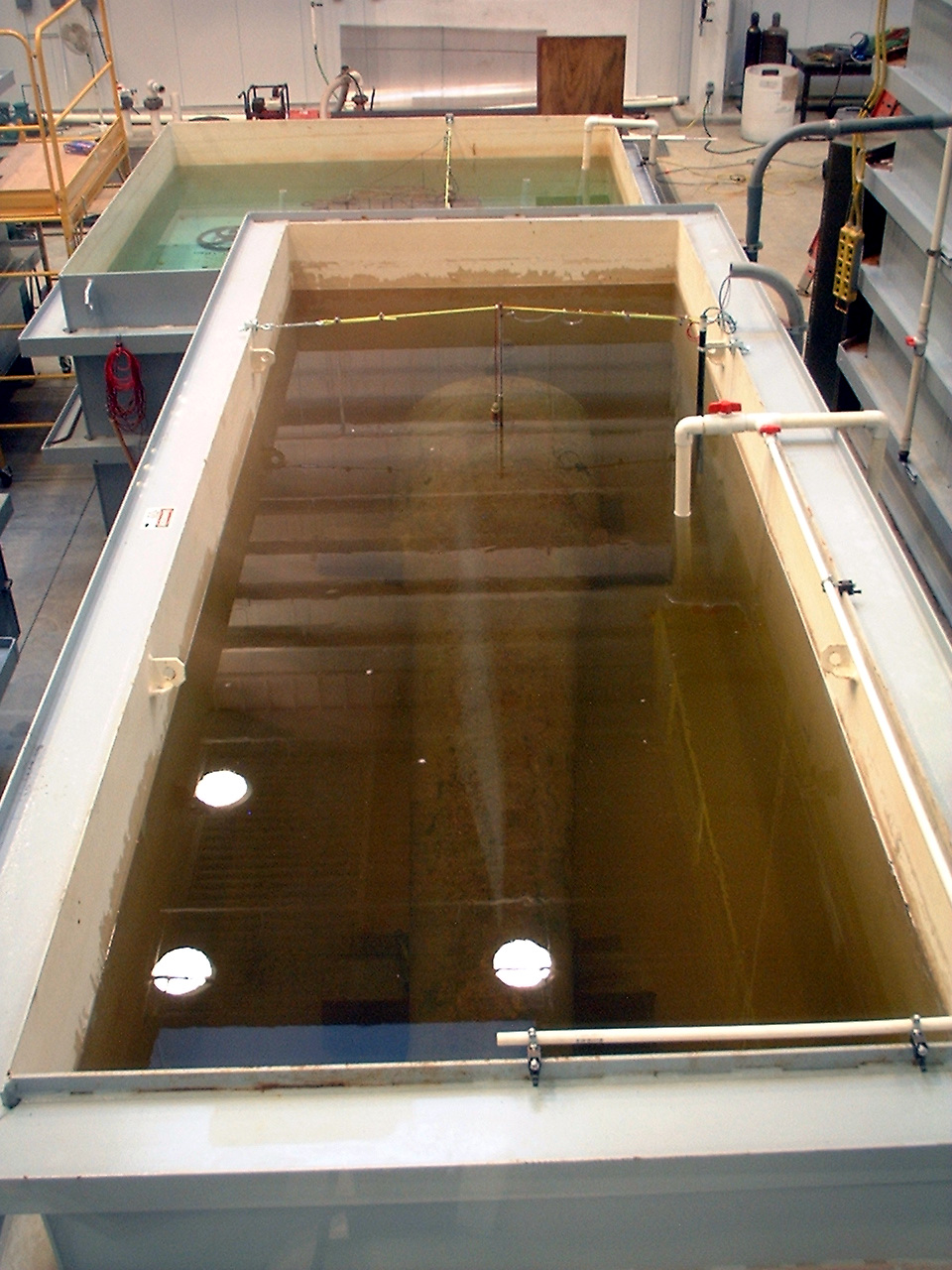
Dahlgren gun

== Park and Noland Trail ==
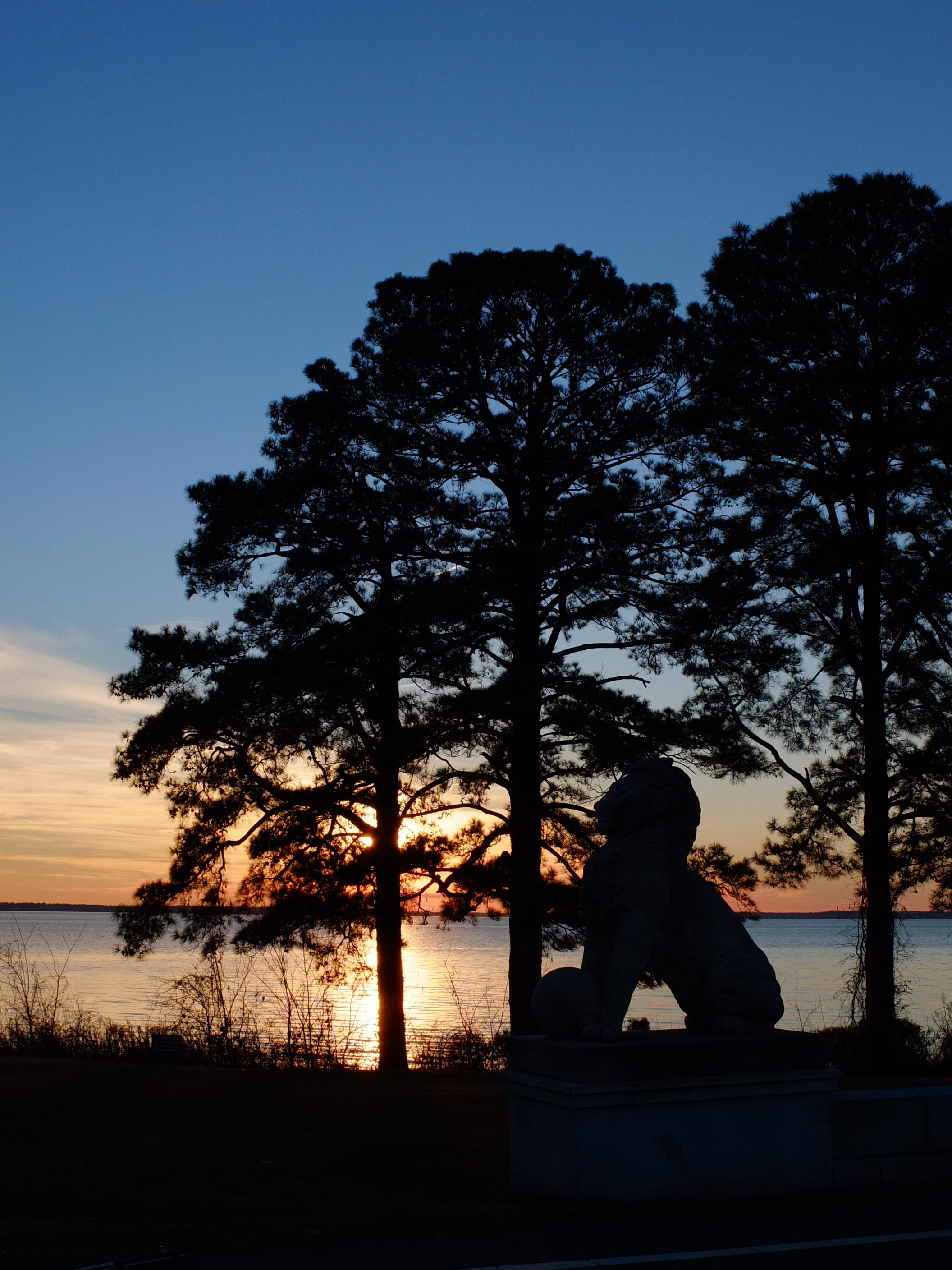
Sunset on the James, as seen from the Lions Bridge

The Mariners' Museum Park is 550 acres of privately maintained, naturally wooded property that offers visitors a quiet and serene place to walk, run, or picnic. Within the Park is the 167-acre The Mariners' Lake.

Following the shoreline of The Mariners' Lake is the five-mile Noland Trail. Dedicated as a gift from the Noland Family in 1991 and with significant ongoing financial support from the Noland Family, the trail has fourteen bridges, picnic areas, benches, handicap access, and mile markers. Each fall The Mariners' Museum hosts a 10K run on the Noland Trail.

The Mariners’ Museum Park is open daily to the public. Benches at approximately every half-mile offer places of rest along the trail, and views of The Mariners' Lake can be found around every corner.

The famous Lions Bridge, a dam that provides a scenic view of the James River, remains a highlight for visitors—a perfect family gathering place to enjoy the Museum Park. The beauty of the dam is enhanced by several fine pieces of statuary designed by Anna Hyatt Huntington, sculptor and wife of Museum founder Archer Milton Huntington. Four stone lions were mounted on the ends of the parapets of the dam in October 1932. Anna also created and dedicated a monument entitled Conquering the Wild that overlooks the Lions Bridge, the park, and The Mariners' Lake.

== See also ==
- List of maritime museums in the United States
- National Maritime Museums, a list of maritime museums around the world
- Skirmish at Waters Creek, a March 8, 1781 revolutionary war skirmish that took place in the area of the park
- Causey's Mill, a historic mill built in 1866 near the park
