= National Maritime Museum (disambiguation) =

The National Maritime Museum is in Greenwich, United Kingdom.

National Maritime Museum may also refer to:

- Australian National Maritime Museum
- National Maritime Museum of China
- Deutsches Schiffahrtsmuseum, Germany
- Het Scheepvaartmuseum, Netherlands
- National Maritime Museum of Ireland
- National Maritime Museum, Indonesia
- National Maritime Museum, Israel
- National Maritime Museum, Malta
- National Maritime Museum, Gdańsk
- National Maritime Museum, New Zealand
- National Maritime Museum, South Korea
- National Maritime Museum (Galle), Sri Lanka
- National Maritime Museum Cornwall, United Kingdom
- Mariners' Museum, the National Maritime Museum of the United States
- San Francisco Maritime National Historical Park

== See also ==
- Category:Maritime museums
- Maritime museum
