= James Bard =

American painter

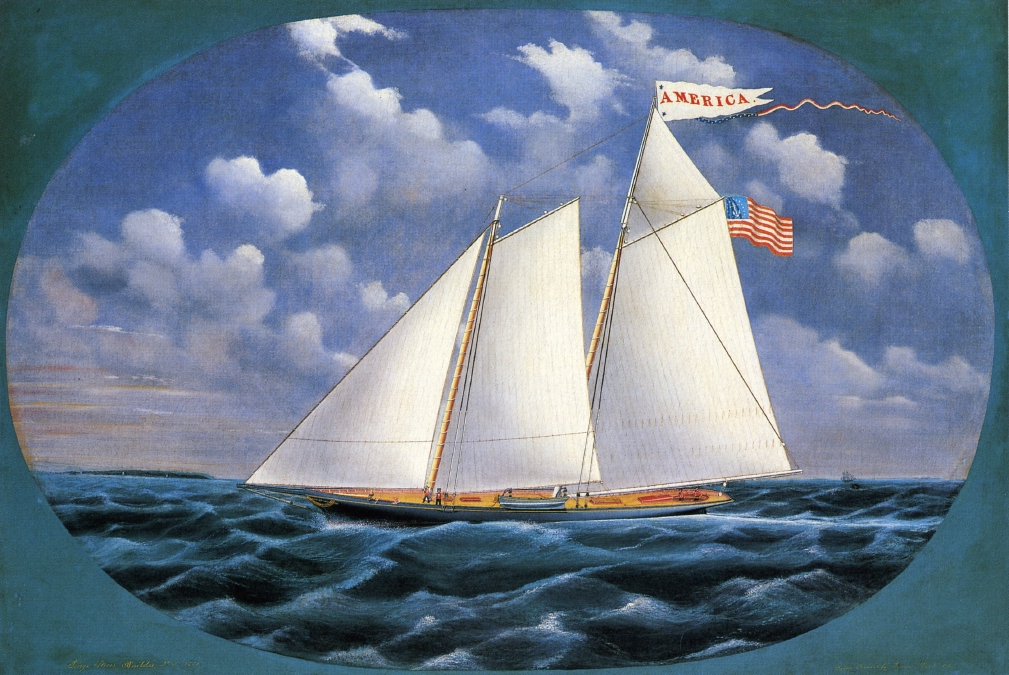
- America, oil on canvas by James Bard, 1851
- Born: James Bard; October 4, 1815; New York City
- Died: March 26, 1897 (aged 81); White Plains, New York
- Education: None
- Known for: Oil painting Watercolor painting

James Bard (1815–1897) was an American marine artist known for his paintings of watercraft, particularly of steamboats. His works are sometimes characterized as naïve art. Although Bard died poor and almost forgotten, his works have since become valuable. Bard had a twin brother, John (1815–1856) and they collaborated on earlier works.

== Life ==
James Bard and John Bard were born in 1815 in New York City. Their father was Joseph Bard, who had been born in England. Their mother was Nellie Purvis Bard, who had been born in Scotland. They had at least two brothers (Joseph and George), two older sisters (Ellen and Mary) and one younger sister, Margaret. Sometime before 1843, Bard married Harriet DeGroot, who was six years older than he was. They had six children, but between 1843 and 1856 five of them died. Only their daughter Ellen survived.

Harriet's brother, Albert DeGroot, later became a steamboat captain and a wealthy man, who commissioned a number of works by James Bard.

== Works ==
=== Joint works with John Bard ===
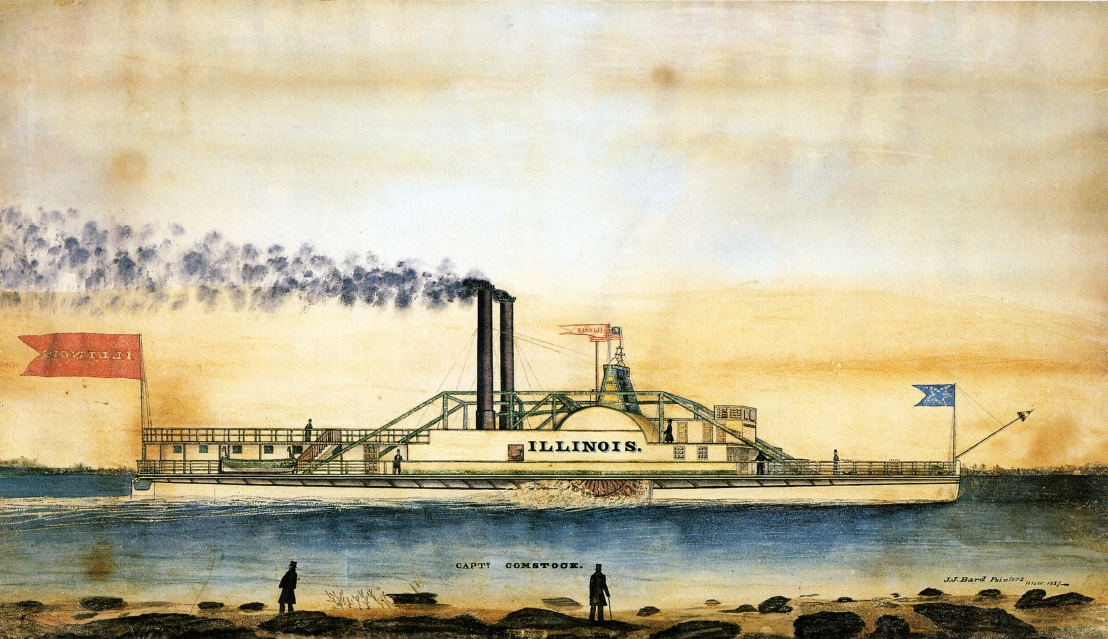
Illinois by James and John Bard, 1837

The first known picture by the Bard brothers is of the steamboat Belona, done in 1827 when they were 12 years old. James continued to work with John through the 1830s and into the 1840s. It is not possible to tell which portions of the work were done by each brother. Their joint works are signed "J & J Bard" or "J & J Bard, Picture Painters." No work survives signed by John alone, but there are several signed "Jas. Bard." They began dating their work by 1836. When their father died in 1838, they were listed in the New York directory for the first time as "painters."

Their works in the 1830s were watercolor. They began improving their technique and moving into oil painting as a medium by the 1840s. There is only one instance recorded of a showing of the brother's joint work, this was in 1842 at a large display of work by other nautical artists held by the American Institute of City of New York at Niblo's Garden.

The last known joint paintings by the brothers were dated 1849. These were of the steamboats Wilson G. Hunt and Senator, both of which left the New York area in March 1850 to travel around South America to the California Gold Rush. After these paintings, there is no further indication of John Bard's participation. It has been suggested that he went to the gold rush, but there is no evidence as to John's whereabouts or activities during this time. John is known to have been admitted to the Blackwell Island alms' house, apparently in poor health. He died on October 18, 1856, and was buried in an unmarked grave in Green-Wood Cemetery in Brooklyn.

=== Later works ===
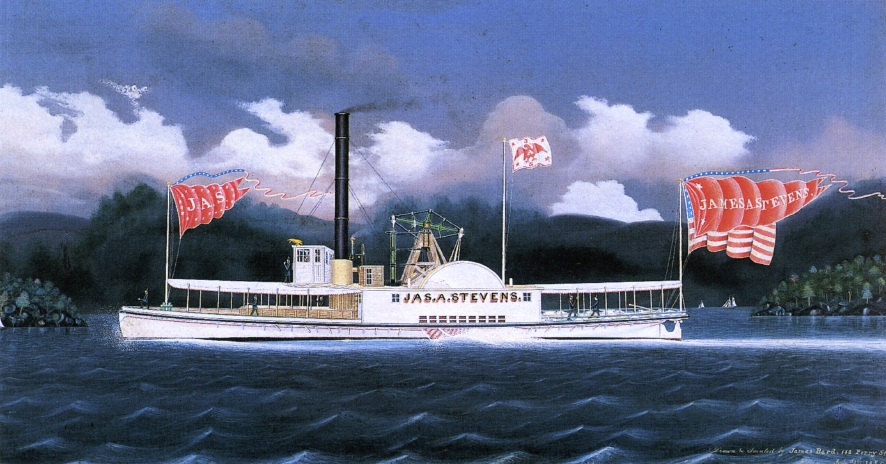
James A. Stevens, oil on canvas, 1857, Mariners' Museum

The break into works done alone by James Bard is marked by the oil paintings of the steamboats Ocean and Boston in March 1850, which are signed by James alone. The 1850s were a boom-time for ship construction in New York, and Bard received many commissions from owners of newly built vessels. Bard appears to have earned a modest living from his work, as he was listed as "artist" in various city directories, but his financial success was somewhat limited, as there is no record that Bard ever opened a bank account or owned real estate. There is some indication he may have worked as a railroad mechanic or engineer in the 1860s. In the 1880s Bard's commissions declined, although as late as 1890 he was still able to produce two commercial watercolors.

Bard may have gone to California in the late 1870s, as he painted two vessels that were assembled there from prefabricated parts manufactured in Brooklyn. There is no record of Bard having traveled to California but it has been pointed out that it would have been unlikely for him to have painted vessels he had never seen in operation.

By 1892, however, with age his ability to draw had deteriorated, and he apparently was no longer able to earn a living. In the 1890s, Bard and his wife moved to White Plains, New York, apparently to live with his daughter, Ellen, who apparently had the sole, if limited ability to support them. In late 1896, Bard's wife Harriet fell ill with pneumonia and she died on January 5, 1897. James Bard himself died on March 26, 1897. Their daughter Ellen lived until 1919. She worked as a maid. Her father's friend, Samuel Ward Stanton, helped her stay off public assistance by sending her money every month. Other than their works, James and John Bard left no papers, journals, wills, or other documents. Bard was almost forgotten by the time of his death in 1897, although he was the subject of a single obituary, probably written by his friend, the important marine artist and historian Samuel Ward Stanton.

== Style ==
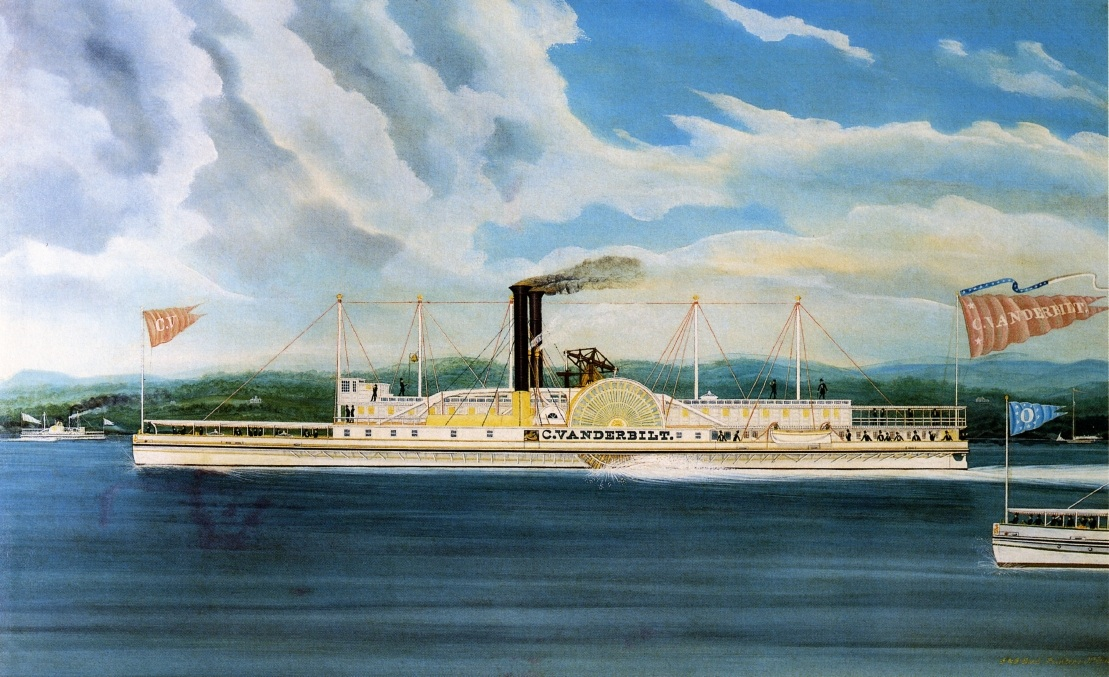
Cornelius Vanderbilt by James and John Bard, 1847

During his life, Bard painted or made drawings of at least 3,000 vessels, including probably every steamer built at New York during his active life as an artist. Bard's works included common features intended to please patrons. Sailboats were shown underway with all sails up. Steamboats likewise were shown underway, with numerous flags flying, including a large one bearing the vessel's name. There would often be inscriptions about the ship and its owner. In one example, James and John Bard painted for their patron Cornelius Vanderbilt, then one of the wealthiest men in the United States, a portrait of the Hudson River steamboat Cornelius Vanderbilt racing the Oregon. Although Oregon won the race, the Vanderbilt is shown in the lead, and all that is visible of the Oregon is the prow and the flag on the jackstaff.

Bard went to great lengths to get the details of the vessel correctly, including personally measuring the vessel in question. Preliminary drawings exist for some vessels. It was customary at that time for marine artists to paint multiple works of a single vessel, which could be different as to the background and other details, depending on orders from patrons. Bard followed this practice, often painting the same vessel multiple times.

== Later recognition ==
As Bard grew older, photography became increasingly used for marine as well as other subject areas, and steamboats themselves declined in importance in relation to the railroads. During Bard's life, Stanton, was the only artist who acknowledged Bard's influence, stating in his 1895 book American Steam Vessels that Bard was a gentleman who had begun the work of steamboat portraiture before 1830, and "to him the maritime world owes gratitude for his contributions to it of correct likenesses of many of the noted steamboats of early days".

Most of the Bard works were done for persons in the steamboat or maritime trades, and as these persons died or went out of business, the works were lost or destroyed. In the earlier part of the 20th century, historians began relying on the surviving Bard works as references. Three of these historians, Francis F.C. Bradlee, George W. Murdock, and Edwin M. Eldredge collected steamboat art and other materials, and they came to acquire many of the Bard works. In time, all three of these collections came into the hands of museums, in particular the Eldredge collection, the most extensive one, went to the Mariners' Museum in Newport News in 1940.

In 1924, for the first time since 1842, two of Bard's works were featured at an art exhibition. After the 1897 obituary, nothing was written about the Bards as artists until 1949, when Alexander Crosby Brown and Harold Sniffen wrote an article published in Art in America which focused on the output of the Bard brothers, the accuracy of their drawings, and their importance for marine historians.

== Auction prices ==
In 1997, Bard works realized prices of over $200,000 at Sotheby's winter and fall auctions. Some recent auction prices are summarized below.

Auction prices for works by James Bard and Bard Brothers
Image	Price	Date	Auction	Place	Comment
Troy	$51,750	February 2–4, 2007	James D. Julia, Inc.	Fairfield, Maine	Highest price realized for marine art at this auction
Martha Washington	$37,000	January 17–18, 2008	Christie's	Rockefeller Center, New York City	Previously in collection of Mariners' Museum, Newport News, Virginia.
Henry Smith	$45,410	January 16–17, 2003	Christie's	Rockefeller Center, New York City	
Daniel S. Miller	$48,000	September 25, 2008	Christie's	Rockefeller Center, New York City	

== Gallery ==
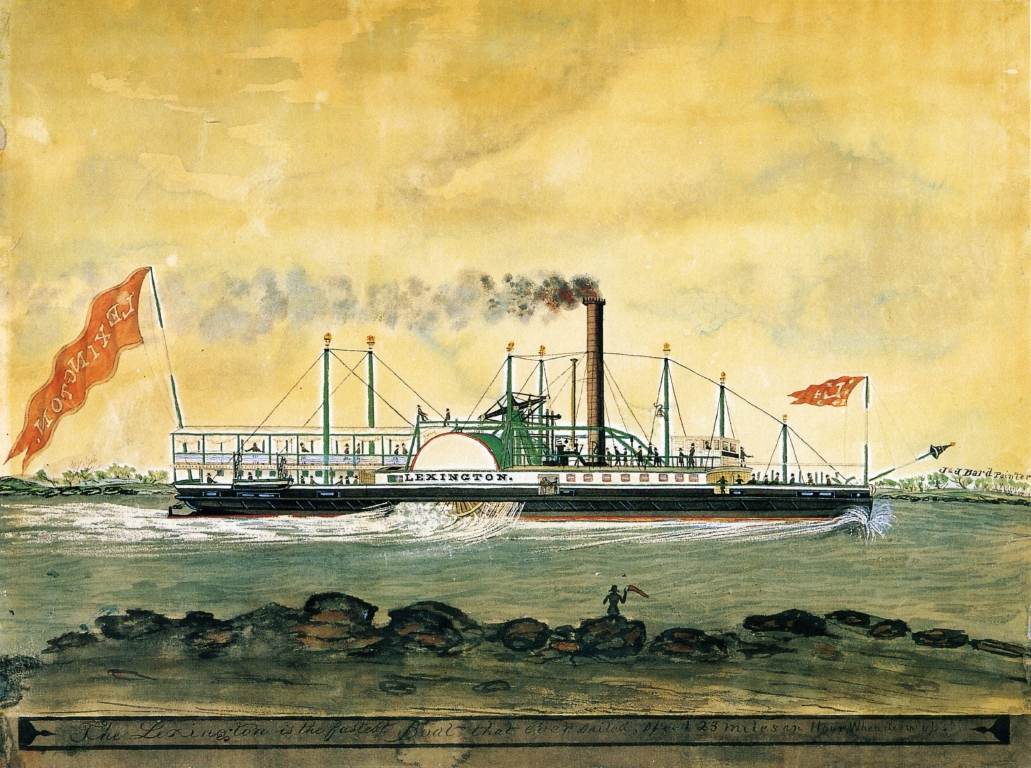
Lexington by James and John Bard, watercolor on paper, circa 1840 (Peabody Essex Museum).

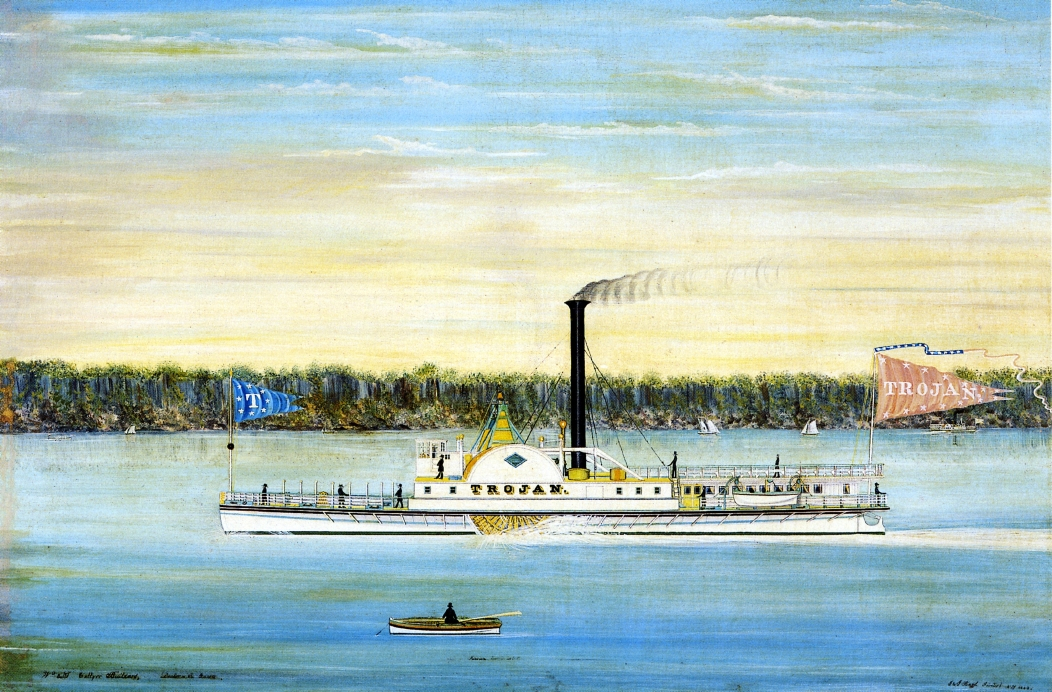
Trojan, water color on paper by James and John Bard 1845 (Mariners' Museum).

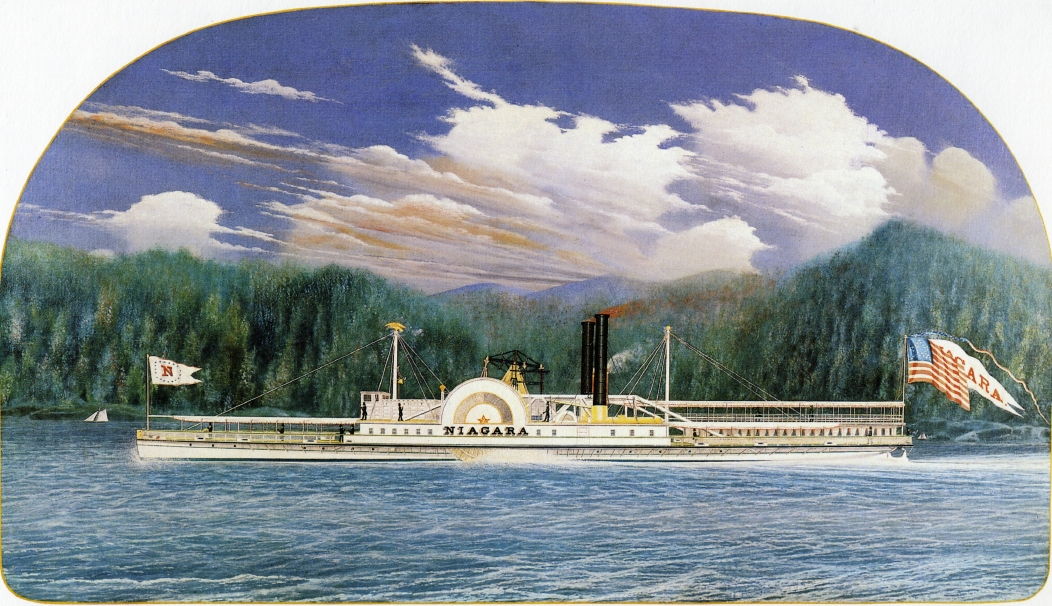
Niagara, oil on canvas by James Bard, 1852 (Mariners' Museum).

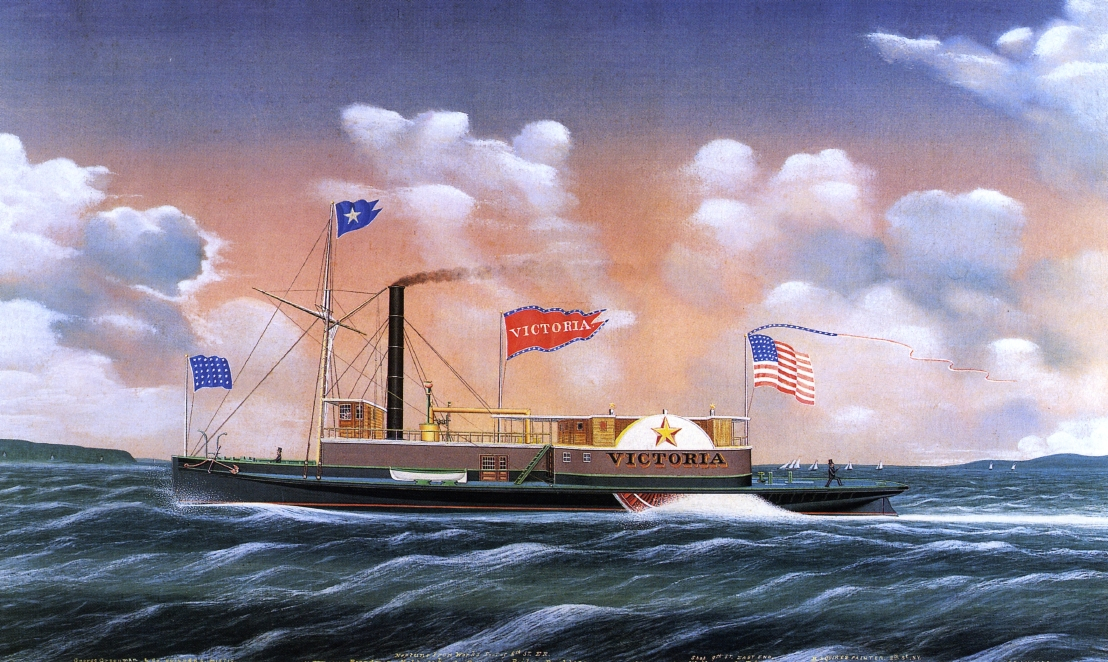
Victoria, oil on canvas by James Bard, 1859 (America Hurrah, New York, NY)

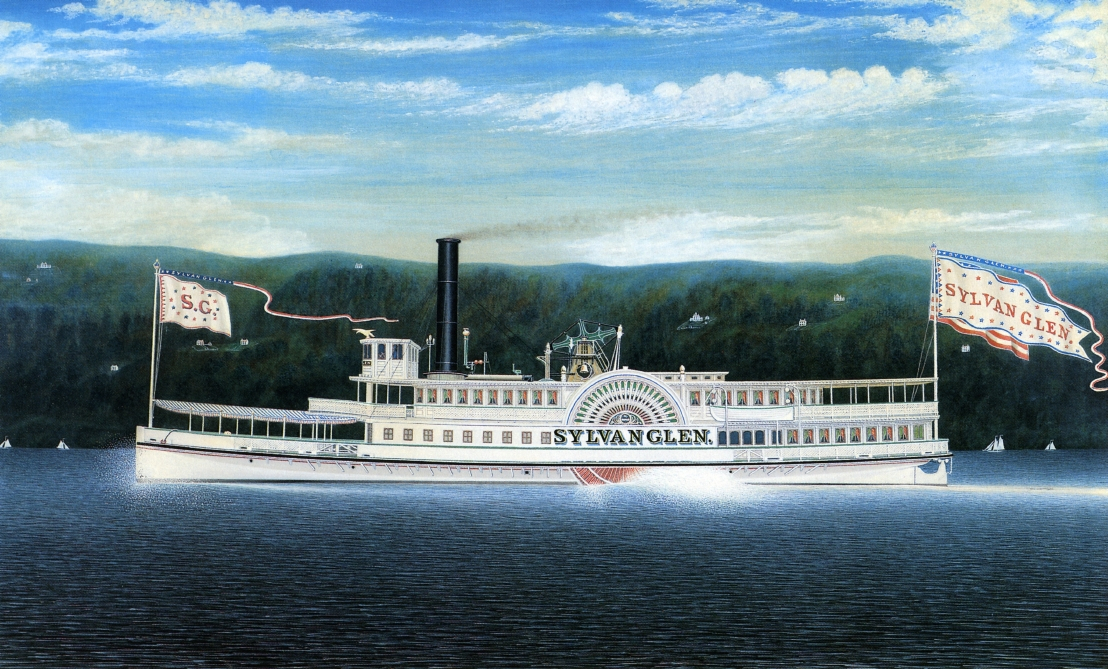
Sylvan Glen, oil on canvas by James Bard 1870 (New-York Historical Society)

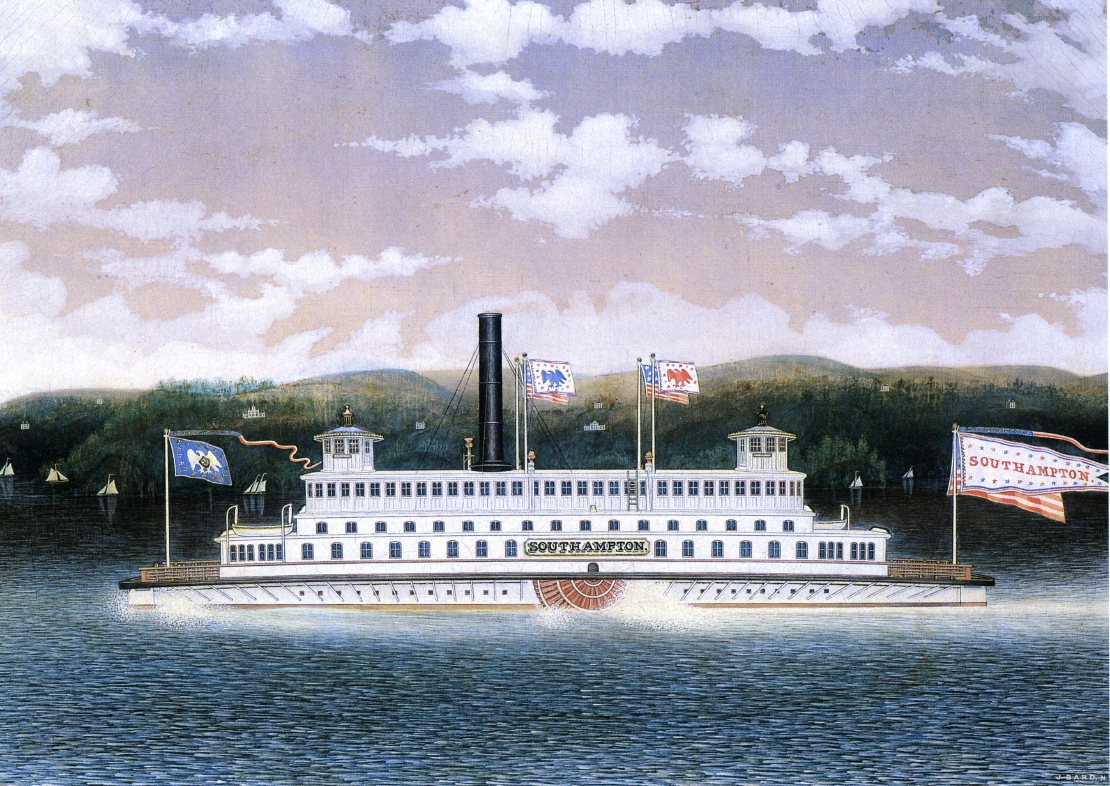
Southampton, oil on canvas by james Bard, 1880 (New-York Historical Society)

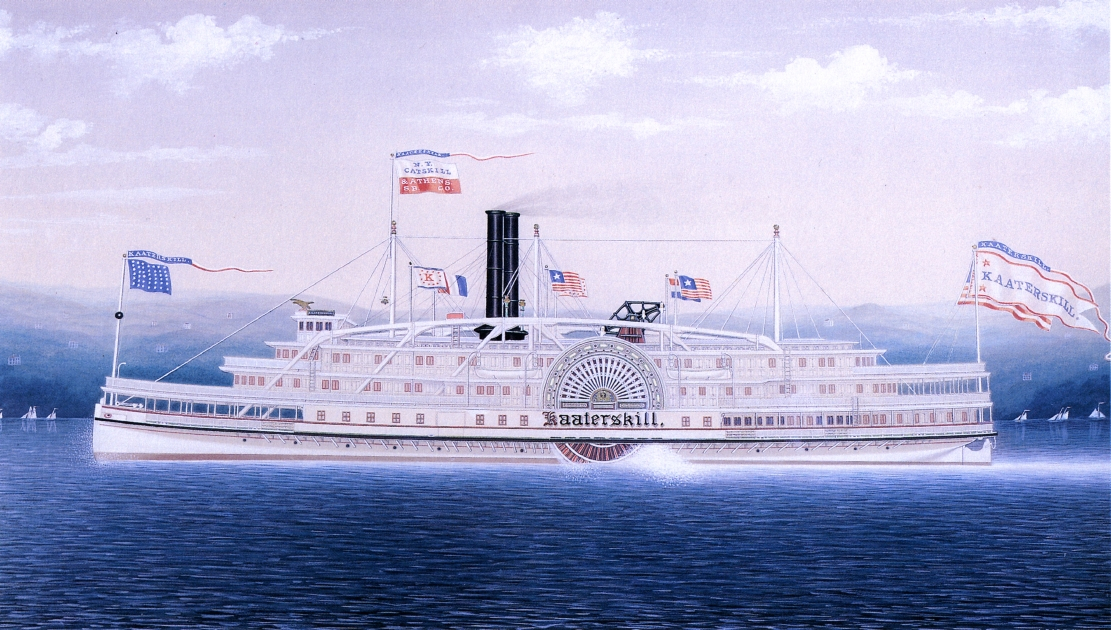
Kaaterskill, oil on canvas by James Bard, 1882 (Huntington Library)

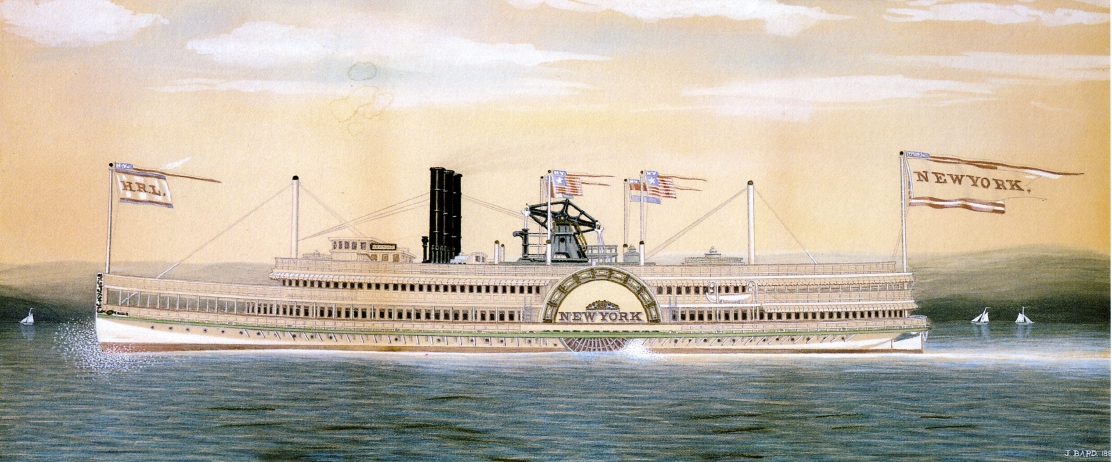
New York, oil on canvas by James Bard 1888 (Chase Manhattan Bank)

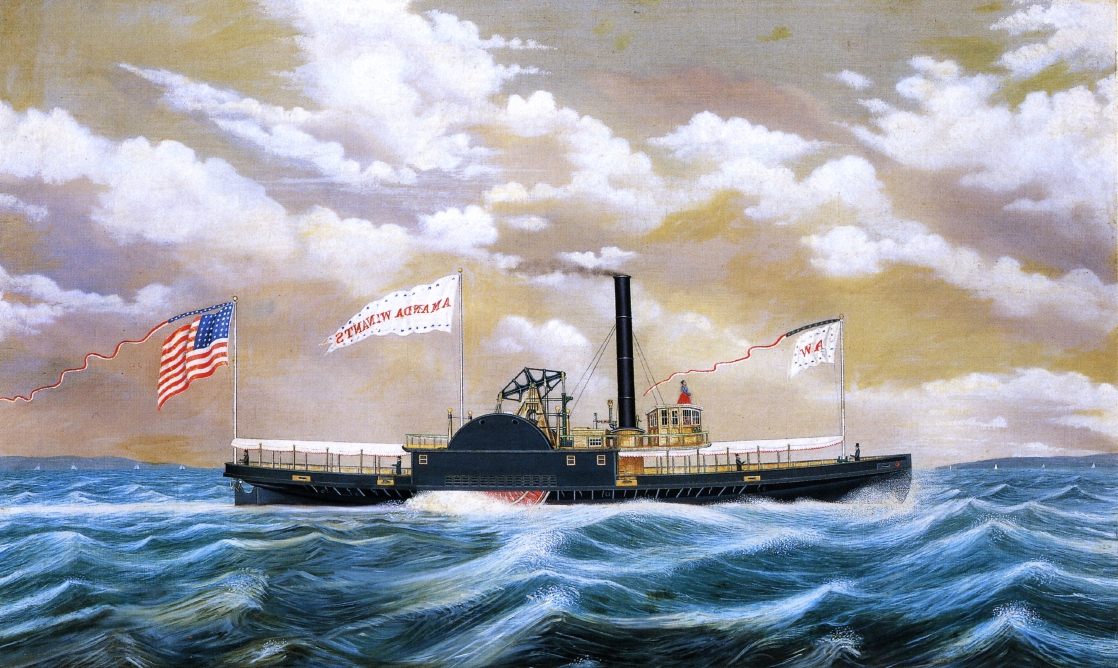
Amanda Winants, oil on canvas by James Bard (Mariners' Museum)
