= Sea Venture =

17th-century English sailing ship

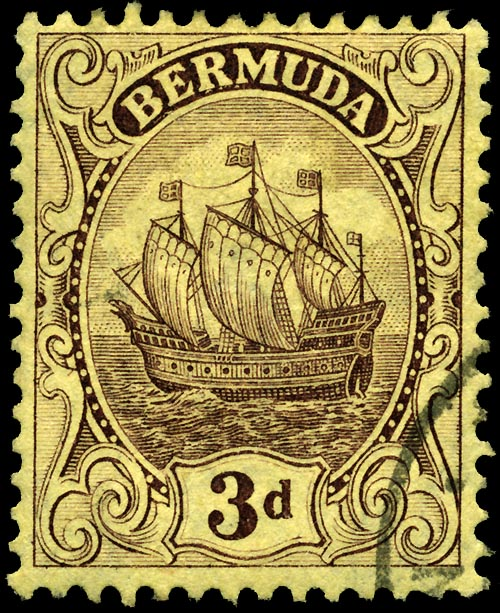
- Artist's interpretation of Sea Venture on a Bermuda stamp, 1910

History
- Name: Sea Venture, Sea Adventure, Seaventure, Sea-Vulture
- Owner: Lionel Cranfield, 1st Earl of Middlesex
- Launched: probably 1603
- Fate: Wrecked

General characteristics
- Class & type: galleon
- Tonnage: 300 tons
- Armament: 8 × 9-pounder (4.1 kg) demi-culverins; 8 × 5-pounder (2.3 kg) sakers; 4 × 3-pounder (1.4 kg) falcons; 4 × arquebuses

Sea Venture was an English sailing ship that was part of the flotilla for the Third Supply mission to the Jamestown Colony in 1609. She was the 300-ton flagship of the London Company. During the voyage to Virginia, Sea Venture encountered a tropical storm and was wrecked, with her crew and passengers landing on the uninhabited island of Bermuda. Sea Venture's wreck is widely thought to have been the inspiration for William Shakespeare's 1611 play The Tempest.

In some writings about the ship made around its era, it was called the Sea Adventure.

== The Virginia Company ==
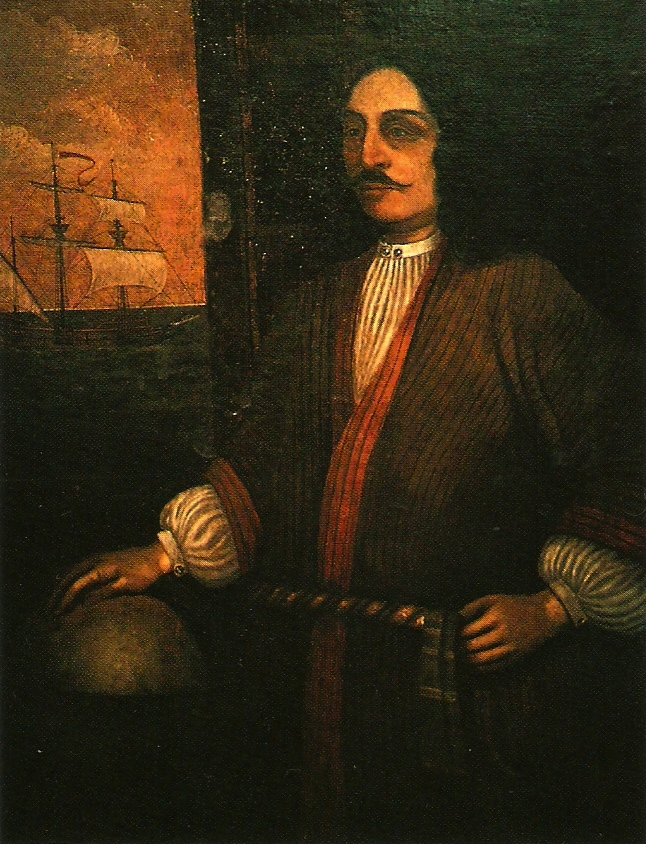
Presumed portrait of Sir George Somers (with possible Sea Venture in left background)

The proprietors of the London Company had established the settlement of Jamestown in Virginia in 1607, and delivered supplies and additional settlers in 1608, raising the English colony's population to 200, despite many deaths. The entire operation was characterized by a lack of resources and experience. The company's fleet was composed of vessels that were less than optimal for delivering large numbers of passengers across the Atlantic Ocean, and the colony itself was threatened by starvation, disease, and warfare with native peoples.

Even with the delivery of supplies in 1608 on the First and Second Supply missions led by Captain Christopher Newport, the colony at Jamestown seemed doomed to meet the same fate as the Roanoke Colony and the Popham Colony, two earlier failed English attempts to settle in North America, unless there was another major relief effort. Yet the investors of the London Company expected to reap rewards from their speculative investments. With the Second Supply, they expressed their frustrations and made demands upon the leaders of Jamestown in written form. They specifically demanded that the colonists send commodities sufficient to pay the cost of the voyage, a lump of gold, assurance that they had found the South Sea, and one member of the lost Roanoke Colony.

It fell to the third president of the council to deliver a reply. Ever bold, Captain John Smith delivered what must have been a wake-up call to the investors in London. In what has been termed "Smith's Rude Answer", he composed a letter, writing (in part):

When you send againe I entreat you rather send but thirty Carpenters, husbandmen, gardiners, fishermen, blacksmiths, masons and diggers up of trees, roots, well provided; than a thousand of such as wee have: for except wee be able both to lodge them and feed them, the most will consume with want of necessaries before they can be made good for anything [sic].

Smith did begin his letter with something of an apology, saying "I humbly intreat your Pardons if I offend you with my rude Answer [sic]".

There are strong indications that those in London comprehended and embraced Smith's message. The Third Supply mission was by far the largest and best equipped. They even had the newly constructed purpose-built flagship Sea Venture placed in the most experienced hands of Christopher Newport.

== Construction ==
Sea Venture was most likely built in 1603 and used in trade with the Low Countries – though there are competing theories which do not stand scrutiny. The archaeological evidence suggests that she was not a newly built vessel at the time of her loss. She was, however, built according to the latest methods for the early 17th century. As such her shape is a development from vessels such as Mary Rose. Her hull shape can be extrapolated from the limited archaeological remains to show a stable hull (even allowing for some inaccuracies in that process) – a finding that is confirmed by her surviving a hurricane (it was a leak that was the problem that arose during the storm).

== Voyage, the storm, and loss in Bermuda ==
On 12 June [O.S. 2 June] 1609, Sea Venture set sail from Plymouth, England, as the flagship of a seven-ship fleet (towing two additional pinnaces) destined for Jamestown, Virginia as part of the Third Supply, which was transporting a total of 500 to 600 people (it is unclear whether that number includes crew, or only settlers). Normally, ships destined for North America from Europe first sailed south as far as the Canary Islands, as at that latitude the mean direction of the wind is to the west, pushing them across the Atlantic (ships returning to Europe turned eastward near the Carolinas, as at that latitude the mean wind direction is to the east). They then followed the chain of islands comprising the West Indies to Florida, and from there followed the Atlantic coast of the continent northward. However, with the West Indies firmly in the grip of the Spanish Empire, the English fleet instead turned northwards in the open Atlantic, intending to bypass the Spanish threat and head directly for Virginia. Days away from Jamestown, on 24 July, the fleet ran into a strong tropical storm, likely a hurricane, and the ships were separated. A pinnace, Catch, went down with all aboard lost. Sea Venture, however, fought the storm for three days. Among sheets of rain and tearing wind, passengers witnessed St. Elmo's fire atop the masts.

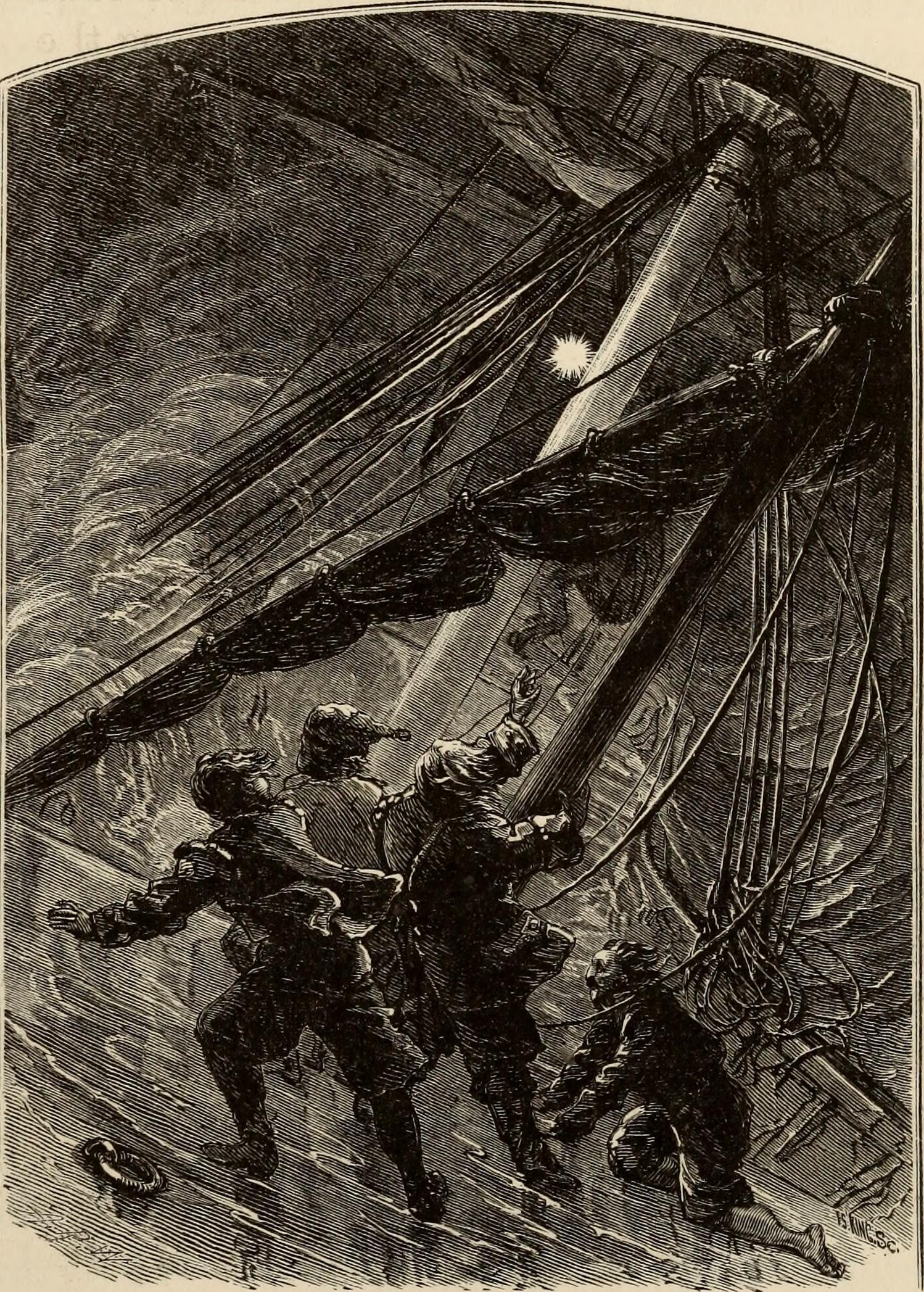
During the storm, St. Elmo's fire was visible on the Sea Venture's masts

Comparably sized ships had survived such weather, but Sea Venture had a critical flaw in her newness: her timbers had not set. The oakum (a caulking) was forced from between the boards, and the ship began to leak rapidly. All hands were applied to bailing, but water continued to rise in the hold. The ship's starboard-side guns were reportedly jettisoned to raise her buoyancy, but this only delayed the inevitable. The Admiral of the Company himself, Sir George Somers, was at the helm through the storm. When he spied land on the morning of 3 August [O.S. 25 July] 1609, the water in the hold had risen to 9 feet (2.7 m), and crew and passengers had been driven past the point of exhaustion.

Whilst still being driven before the storm, the only choice was to try and pick a route through the offshore reefs. About 0.5–0.75 miles (0.80–1.21 km) from shore, the ship became wedged in a V-shaped gap in the reefs (in what later was named Sea Venture Shoals). The worst of the weather now passed, (Note: When Hurricane Dean struck Bermuda in 1989, as the storm eased, the sea in the vicinity of the Sea Venture wreck became calm very quickly, apparently replicating the conditions that enabled the survivors of the wreck to get ashore safely in the ship's boats.) allowing 140 men and 10 women (most of whom could not swim), and one dog, to be taken ashore in boats. (Note: The total number of human passengers and crew is variously given as 150, though the account of survivor William Strachey appears to list 153: "In it were two Knights, Sir Thomas Gates, Knight Gouernor of the English Forces and Colonie there : and Sir George Summers Knight, Admirall of the Seas. Her Captaine was Christopher Newport, Passengers and Mariners, shee had beside (which came all safe to Land) one hundred and fiftie".) The passengers and crew ferried to the beach at Gates' Bay, St. George's Island.

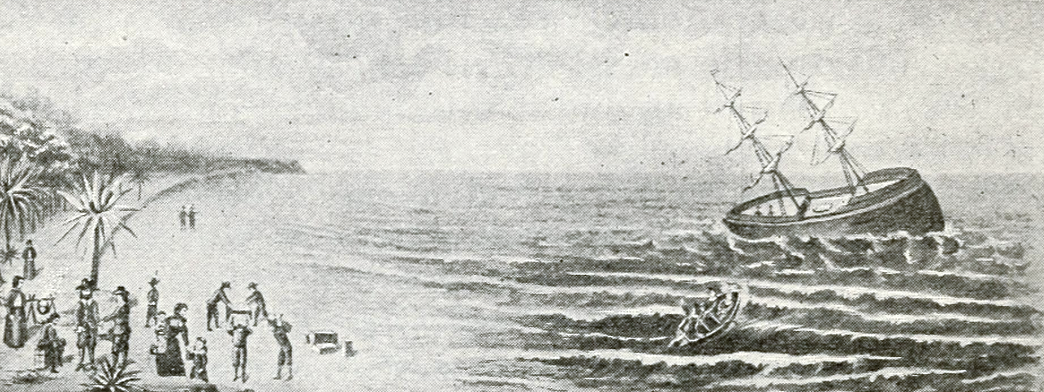
Wreck of the Sea Venture

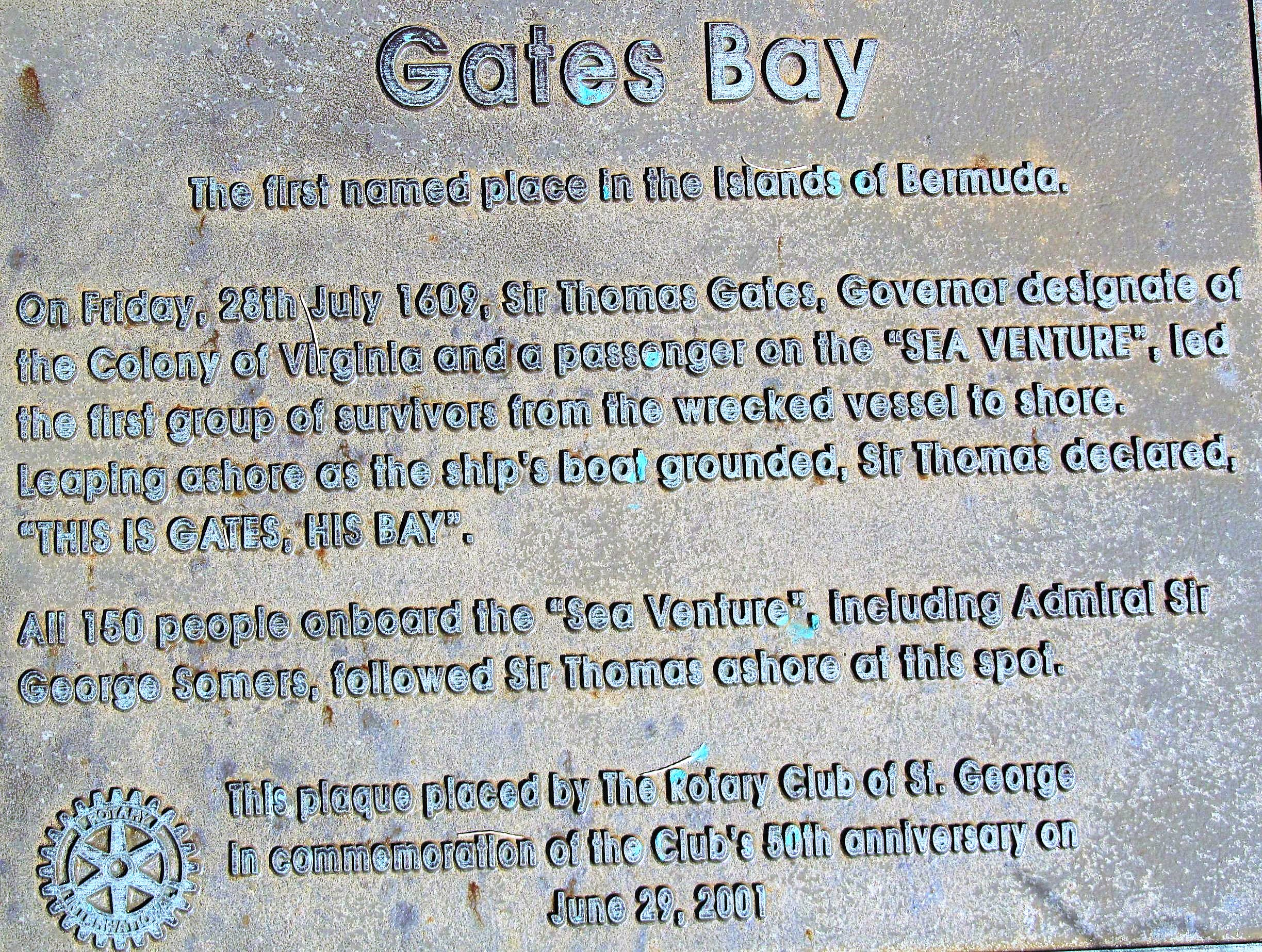
Plaque at Gates Bay

The survivors included several company officials: Lieutenant-General Sir Thomas Gates, the ship's captain Christopher Newport, Samuel Jordan, Silvester Jourdain, Stephen Hopkins (later of Mayflower), and secretary William Strachey. These and nearly 150 others, including future English notables George Yeardley and John Rolfe, as well as the Powhatan emissary Namontack and his companion, Machumps, were all stranded on Bermuda for approximately nine months.

== Deliverance and Patience ==
Despite being stranded on a completely uninhabited island, the colonists from the Sea Venture were unwilling to move on, having now heard about the true conditions in Jamestown from the sailors, and made multiple attempts to rebel and stay in Bermuda. They argued, as the Mayflower passengers later argued, that they had been freed from their contract by the hurricane and shipwreck, and could now choose their own government. Governor Gates suppressed escape attempts, and the new settlement became a sort of prison labour camp, with settlers forced to build ships to carry them away against their wills.

During the time on Bermuda, the survivors constructed two new ships, the pinnaces Deliverance and Patience, from local Bermuda cedar, a wood especially prized by regional shipbuilders because it was as strong as oak, yet lighter. This misnamed juniper species could be worked with immediately after felling and has high resistance to rot and wood worms. Materials salvaged from the beached wreck were also used, especially her rigging. (Note: Forests filled with "cedar" were everywhere on Bermuda, and the colony became a major shipbuilding center after the dissolution of the Somers Isles Company in 1684. Export of Bermuda cedar for shipbuilding was severely restricted by the local assembly in 1627, but shipbuilding had nonetheless denuded much of Bermuda's landscape by the 1830s.) They were constructed between late fall 1609 and early spring 1610 under the guidance of Admiral Somers and James Davis, Captain of the "Gift of God", who possessed considerable shipbuilding knowledge. These ships represented the second and third pinnaces built in the English colonies in the Americas, the first being the 1607–1608 construction of Virginia at the Popham Colony in New England.

The original plan was to build only one vessel, Deliverance, but it soon became evident that she would not be large enough to carry the settlers and all of the food that was being sourced on the islands. The Deliverance was constructed under the direction of ship's carpenter Richard Frobisher not far from Gates' Bay, at a beach which is still known as Buildings Bay (or Building Cove). The Patience is generally believed to have been built at Walsingham Bay (on the western shore of Castle Harbour, said to be named after the coxswain Robert Walsingham). Bermudian teacher and Lieutenant-Commander Royal Naval Reserve (Sea Cadet Corps) Dr. Derek Tully, however, has suggested St. David's Island as the construction site. In Strachey's account:

In his absence Sir George Summers coasted the Ilands, and drew the former plot of them, and daily fished, and hunted for our whole company, vntill the seuen and twentieth of Nouember, when then well perceuing that we were not likely to heare from Virginia, and conceuing how the Pinnace which Richard Frubbusher was a building would not be of a burthen sufficient to transport all our men from thence into Virginia (especially considering the season of the yeare, wherein we were likely to put off) he consulted with our Gouernor, that if hee might haue two Carpenters (for we had foure, such as they were) and twenty men, ouer with him into the maine Iland, he would quickly frame vp another little Barke, to second ours, for the better sitting and conueiance of our people.

The wreck of the Sea Venture is prominent on the Bermuda coat of arms and flag

Of the 150–153 mariners and passengers Strachey reported as surviving the wreck – Gates, Somers, Newport, and 150 others – six died during their time in Bermuda, including Mrs. Rolfe, the wife of John Rolfe; Edward Samuell, the sailor killed by Edward Waters; Richard Lewis; William Hitchman; Jeffery Briars; and Henry Paine, who was executed by firing squad. Additionally, the Powhattan emissary Namontack vanished while on a hunting expedition with Machumps, and their fates were never discovered. While the new ships were being built, Sea Venture's longboat was fitted with a mast and sent under the command of Henry Ravens to find Virginia, along with a crew consisting of cape merchant Thomas Whittingham and six unidentified sailors. They returned several days later, having been unable to find a passage through Bermuda's reefline onto the open Atlantic, then set out for another attempt and were never heard from again. Two children were born in Bermuda: the daughter of the Rolfes, Bermuda Rolfe, who died and was buried in Bermuda; and Bermudas Eason, the son of Edward Eason and his wife. Minus Carter and Waters, this would give a figure of 137 passengers and crew that continued to Jamestown aboard the Deliverance and Patience, including one child born in Bermuda after the wreck of the Sea Venture.

Finally, under the command of Newport, the two ships and all but two of the survivors set sail for Virginia on 10 May 1610, and arrived at the Jamestown settlement on the 23rd, a journey of less than two weeks. (Note: Christopher Newport had an extraordinary career as a privateer and then ship captain for the Virginia Company of London. He captained the flagship Susan Constant that planted the first settlers in Virginia, landing on 26 April 1607. He then commanded John and Francis and Phenix, two ships that comprised the First Supply, and delivered 120 additional colonists to Jamestown on 8 January 1608. As captain of the 150-ton Mary Margaret, Newport also led the Second Supply to Jamestown. The Second Supply landed in September 1608 and delivered 70 colonists that included the first women from England. On a voyage to Indonesia for the British East India Company, he died in Java in 1617.) Two sailors, Christopher Carter and Edward Waters (whom some records identify as Robert Waters), remained behind on Smith's Island—Waters faced possible trial for the killing of another sailor and had fled into the forest. Carter, like many others of the settlers and crew, did not wish to leave Bermuda and had joined Waters in the forest to avoid being compelled to leave.

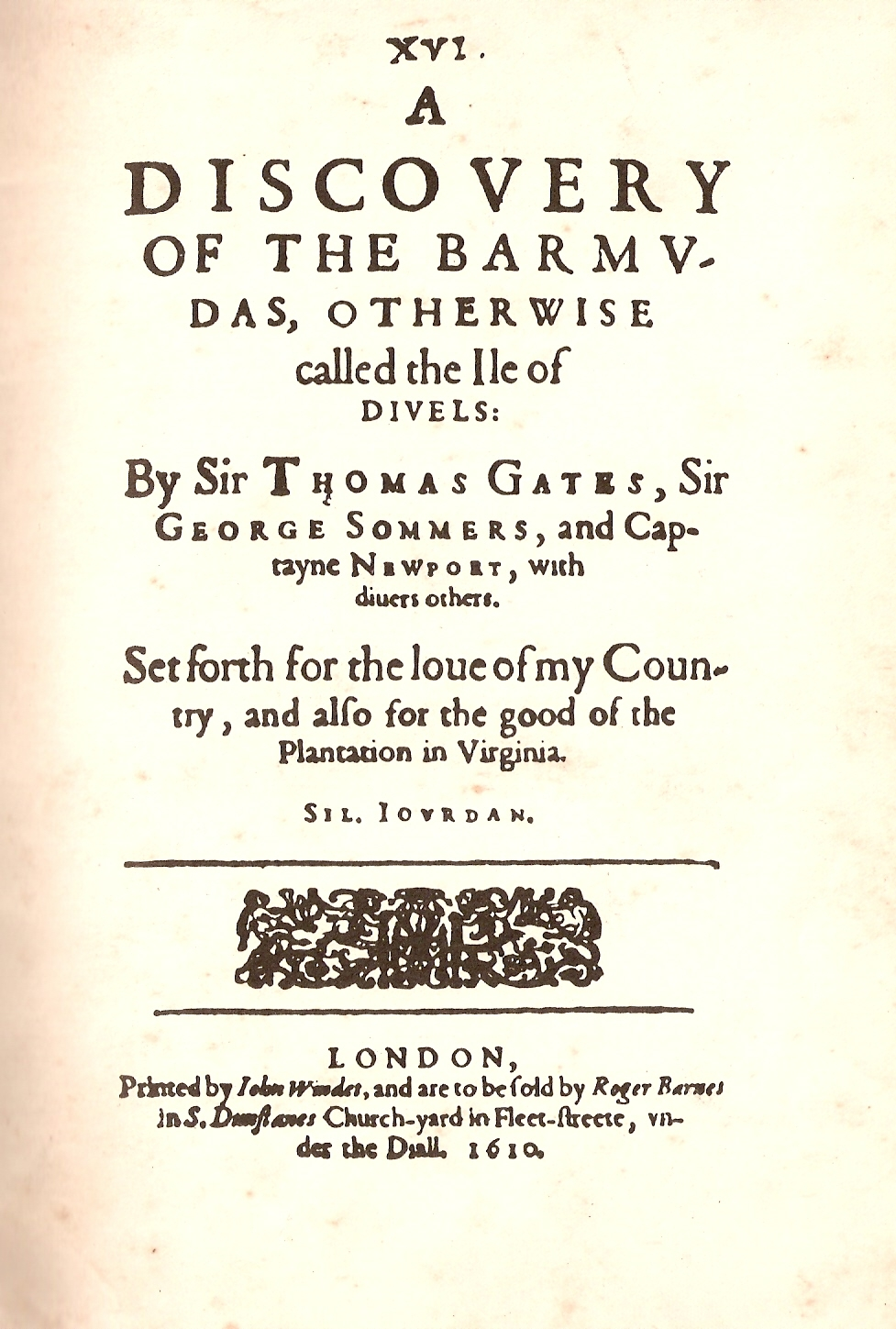
Sylvester Jordain's A Discovery of the Barmudas, 1610

On reaching Jamestown, it was discovered that only 60 colonists remained of the 500 or so who had preceded them. Many of these were themselves dying, and Jamestown was quickly judged to be non-viable. Everyone then boarded Virginia, Deliverance, and Patience, which set sail for England. The timely arrival of another relief fleet, bearing Governor Thomas West, 3rd Baron De La Warr, granted Jamestown a reprieve. All the settlers were relanded at the colony, but there was still a critical shortage of food. In the fall of 1610, Admiral Somers returned to Bermuda in Patience to obtain wild pigs and food that had been stockpiled there. Unfortunately, Somers died in Bermuda from a "surfeit of pork" and the pinnace, captained by his nephew Mathew Somers, returned directly to Lyme Regis in Dorset, England, with the body in order to claim his inheritance. Christopher Carter and Edward Waters, who evidently had been forgiven their earlier desertion, remained behind in Bermuda, again, and were joined by Edward Chard, becoming the first permanent settlers of Bermuda (Carter and Waters were among the Counsell of Six appointed to advise the first Lieutenant-Governor of Bermuda, Richard Moore, in 1612, and were among those between whom the Lieutenant-Governorship was rotated during the period in 1616 between the departure of Moore and the arrival of his successor). In the end, the food and supplies brought by the Third Supply proved inadequate; 80% of the colonists would die during the Starving Time of 1610. Afterwards, the survivors at Jamestown boarded Deliverance and Patience and were sailing downstream to the ocean when they met yet another resupply fleet. Lord De La Warr was this expedition's leader and he turned the distraught settlers back. He had brought a doctor but food supplies remained inadequate.

== Later history ==
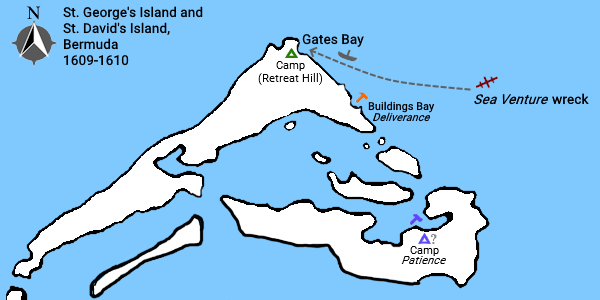
Map with approximate location of Sea Venture and other 1609 markers

Sea Venture sat atop the reefs off Gates' Bay long enough to be stripped of all useful parts and materials, not only by her crew and passengers, but by subsequent settlers; what was left of her eventually disappeared beneath the waves. Two of her guns were salvaged in 1612 and used in the initial fortification of Bermuda (one was placed on Governor's Island, opposite Paget's Fort, the other on Castle Island).

After the wreck's submergence, her precise location was lost until rediscovered by sport divers Downing and Heird in October 1958, still wedged into a coral reef. There was little left of the ship or its cargo. Despite the lack of artifacts to be found, she was positively identified in 1959, in time for the 350th anniversary of the wrecking. Subsequent research uncovered one gun and cannonball, along with shot for small arms. There were also some Spanish jars, stoneware from Germany and ceramics and cooking pots much like what had been found during the excavation of Jamestown.

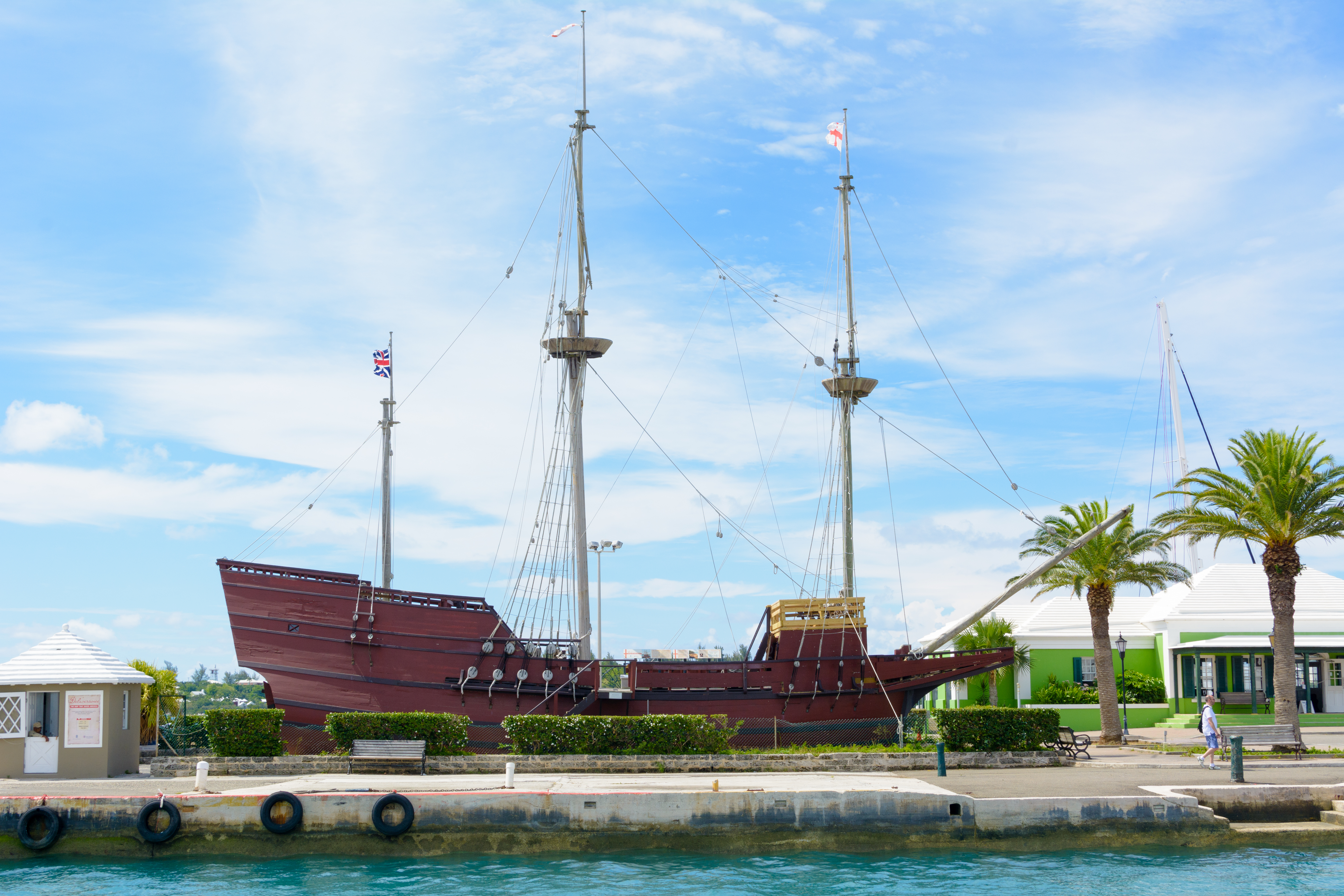
Replica of the Deliverance on Ordnance Island in 2014

In the 1960s, a replica of Deliverance was displayed (in drydock) on Ordnance Island. Deeming the replica beyond repair and unsafe after decades of storms, it was demolished in 2022.

In 2015, the remains of the Sea Venture's hull were buried with sandbags to protect the remnants from shipworms.

== Legacy ==
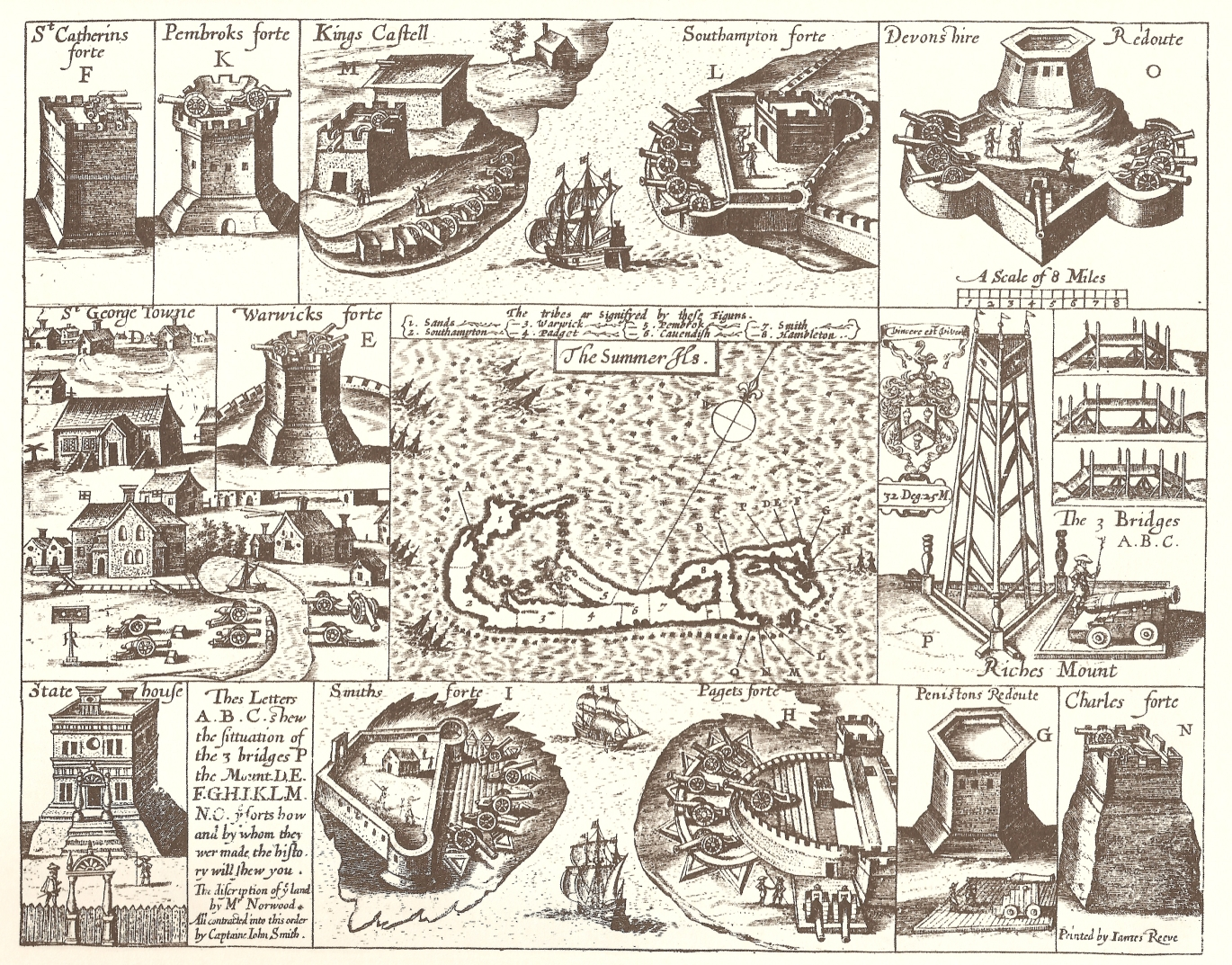
Captain John Smith's 1624 map of the Somers Isles (Bermuda), showing St. George's Town and related fortifications, including the Castle Islands Fortifications

The wreck of the Sea Venture is believed to have inspired William Shakespeare's play The Tempest, probably written in 1610–1611. This tradition has been confirmed by a detailed comparison to survivors' narratives such as Silvester Jourdain's A Discovery of the Barmudas, Robert Rich's "Newes from Virginia: the lost flocke triumphant", and that of historian and author William Strachey, who wrote an account of the storm entitled True Reportory of the Wrack, and Redemption of Sir Thomas Gates Knight. Though these accounts were not published until after the play's writing, their existence implies Shakespeare was likely aware of the wreck from other, similar contemporary accounts and may even have drawn upon them for inspiration.

The story of the Sea Venture has been recounted or fictionalized in many other written works, including:

- The Three Kings Of Bermuda & Their Treasure Of Ambergris (1840) by Washington Irving
- The Sea 'Venture (1961), a fictionalised account of the wreck by Bermuda resident and novelist F. Van Wyck Mason
- The Serpent Never Sleeps, a fictionalized account written and published by American author Scott O'Dell
- A Lion to Guard Us, a fictionalized account of the Sea Venture's voyage by children's author Clyde Robert Bulla, which focuses on three children sailing to Jamestown to find their father.

Sea Venture was also the namesake of a cruise liner which operated between the U.S. and Bermuda in the 1970s for Flagship Cruises, before being acquired by Princess Cruises, which renamed her Pacific Princess. She was subsequently used in the television show The Love Boat.

== See also ==
- Colony and Dominion of Virginia
- History of Bermuda
- History of Virginia
- Jamestown supply missions § Third supply mission
- Somers Isles Company
- Virginia Company
