= Causey's Mill =

- U.S. National Register of Historic Places
- Virginia Landmarks Register
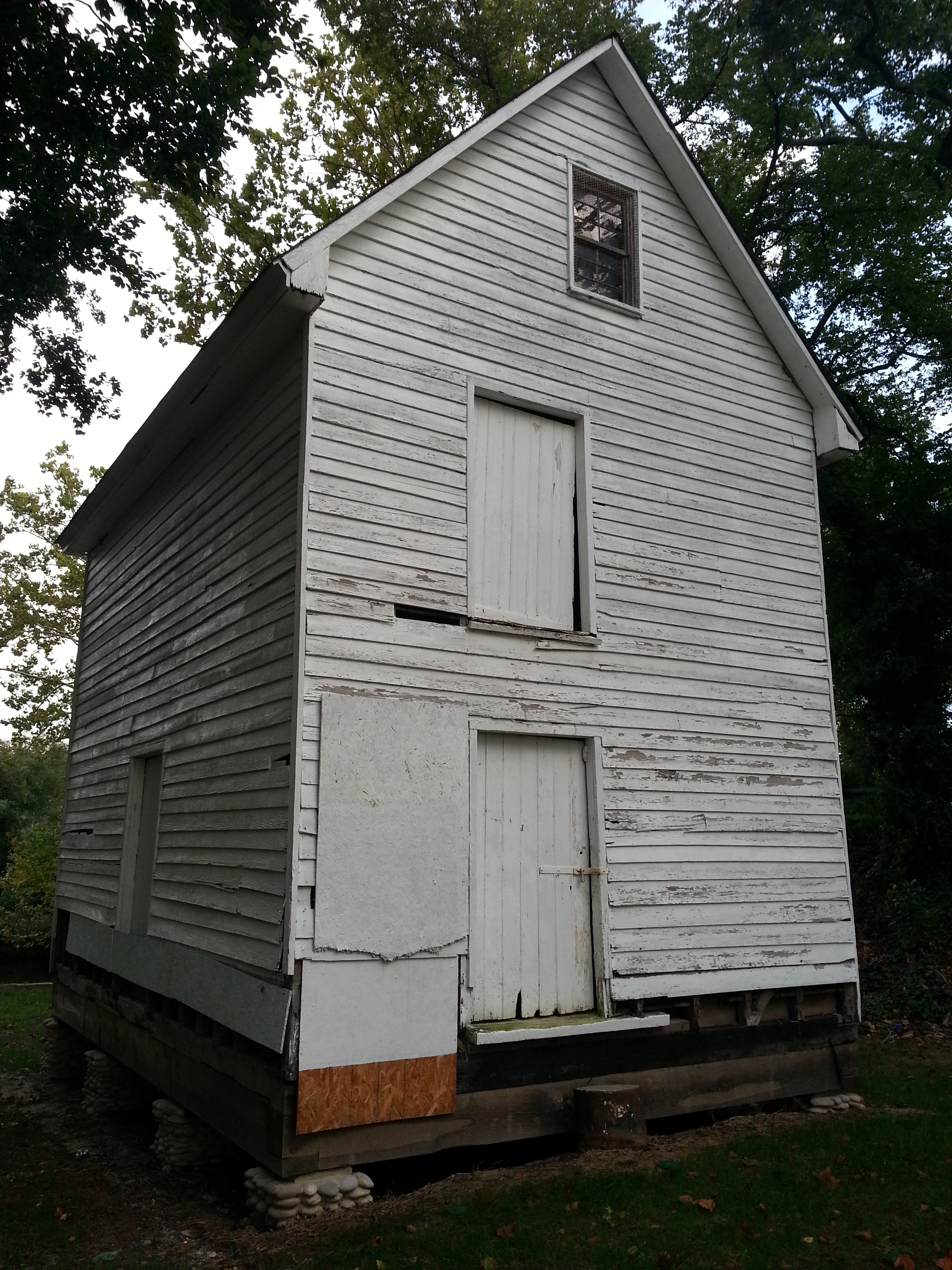
- Causey's Mill, September 2012

- Location within Virginia Location within the United States
- Location: 11700 Warwick Rd., Newport News, Virginia
- Coordinates: 37°3′31″N 76°29′1″W
- Area: 1.2 acres (0.49 ha)
- Built: 1866
- Built by: Causey, William
- NRHP reference No.: 08000078
- VLR No.: 121-0012

Significant dates
- Added to NRHP: February 21, 2008
- Designated VLR: December 5, 2007

Causey's Mill is a historic grist mill located in Causey's Mill Park at Newport News, Virginia. It was built in 1866, and is a small two-story wood-frame building originally supported by a brick and concrete foundation. It retains its original machinery and is one of the two last surviving grist mills on the Peninsula. The mill operated until nearly the 20th century. In 2011, the mill was moved about 75 feet (23 m) from its original location away from the shore of the Mariners' Lake and set on a new foundation.

It was listed on the National Register of Historic Places in 2008.

== History ==
The mill is located in a 1.1-acre park on the shore of The Mariner's Lake just east of Warwick Blvd. (route 60) in Newport News. The site itself had been used as a tidal grist mill dating back to the 17th century. The mill property was purchased by William Causey at the end of the Civil War and he built his mill in 1866 on part of the original foundation of Langhorne's Mill which was at that time situated on Waters Creek. Causey's new mill incorporated lumber dating back to the 17th century but he replaced the existing machinery with a new state-of-the-art Leffel turbine wheel which produced superior water-ground corn meal. The mill had ceased to function by 1890 when Collis P. Huntington purchased the land along with nearby tracts. Waters Creek was dammed in 1930 to create Lake Maury, now The Mariner's Lake, submerging the original mill pond and dam that served Causey's Mill. At that time the mill itself became the property of the Mariner's Museum. It is the only remaining grist mill on the lower Virginia peninsula that retains its original machinery. In 2006 the City of Newport News took over the property, leasing the land from the Mariner's Museum for 55 years. The city undertook efforts to maintain and restore the mill, including moving the mill back from the lake onto a new foundation in 2011.
