= The Mariners' Lake =

- Lake Maury
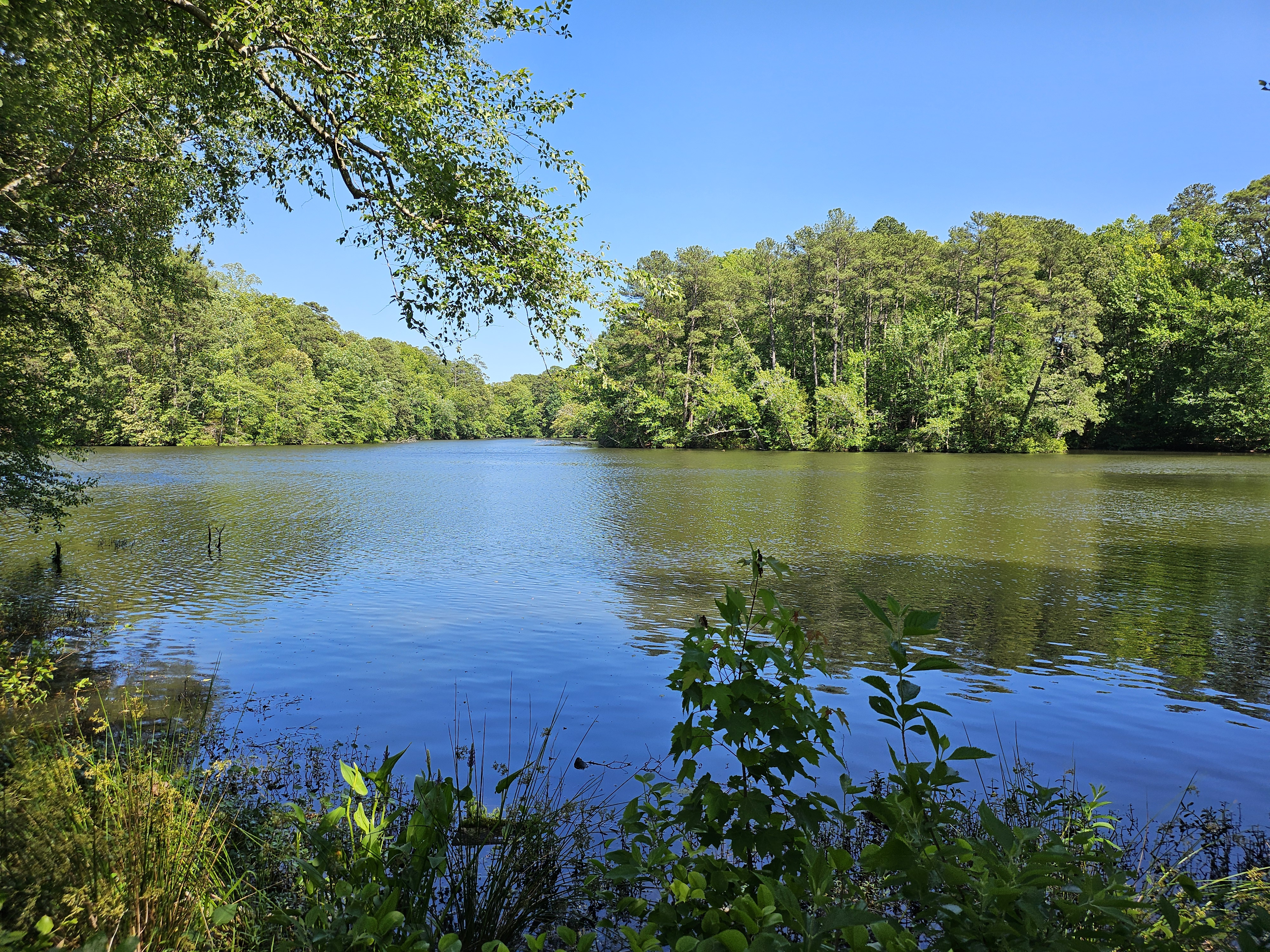
- The Mariners' Lake from Causey's Mill

- Location within Virginia Location within the United States
- Location: Mariners' Museum and Park, Newport News, Virginia
- Coordinates: 37°02′31″N 76°29′14″W
- Type: reservoir
- Etymology: Mariners' Museum and Park (formerly Matthew Fontaine Maury)
- Basin countries: United States
- Surface area: 167 acres (68 ha)
- Website: https://www.marinersmuseum.org/park/mariners-lake/

The Mariners' Lake is a reservoir which was created as part of the natural park on the grounds of the Mariners' Museum and Park located in the independent city of Newport News in the Hampton Roads region of southeastern Virginia. The area was previously known as Waters Creek [sic] before it was dammed around 1930, and Lake Maury from 1930 to 2020.

The area originally appeared in colonial Virginia history as a 100-acre land grant from governor Sir Francis Wyatt to Edward Waters in 1624, located between a creek and Blunt Poynt. The creek would carry Waters' name until it was dammed to create a reservoir in 1930. William Whitby obtained a 1300-acre tract of land around the creek in 1652. The creek supported a series of gristmill operations from as early as the seventeenth century, including Causey's Mill built in 1866). in 1675, the Langhorne family would acquire the land, build a home called 'Gambell', and grow their holdings in the area over several generations. On March 8 1781, the area near the mouth of the creek would be the site of a revolutionary war skirmish between American and British troops. In 1815 John Mallicote would acquire the property. In 1845, John Gambol would purchase the property. The Langhorne, Mallicote, and Gambol surnames are associated with the history of Warwick County, Virginia.

In 1930, the land would be purchased by Archer Milton Huntington and his wife Anna Hyatt Huntington. Archer was son of Collis P. Huntington, a railroad builder who brought the Chesapeake and Ohio Railway to Warwick County, Virginia, and who founded the City of Newport News, its coal export facilities, and Newport News Shipbuilding in the late 19th century.

After the Huntington acquisition took place, the first two years were devoted to creating and improving a natural park and constructing a dam to create a lake that the Board of Trustees named Lake Maury after the nineteenth-century Virginian Commodore and eventual confederate commander Matthew Fontaine Maury, who was nicknamed the "Father of Modern Oceanography". Archer and his wife would use the acquired 800 acres (3.2 km^{2}) to develop a museum and park that would come to hold 61,000 square feet (5,700 m^{2}) of exhibition galleries, a research library, a 167-acre (676,000 m^{2}) lake, a five-mile (8 km) shoreline trail with fourteen bridges, and over 35,000 maritime artifacts from around the globe.

On June 19, 2020, during the George Floyd protests, as references to Confederate figures were being removed from names, The Mariners' Museum's board of trustees voted to rename the lake from "Lake Maury" to The Mariners' Lake.

== See also ==
- Skirmish at Waters Creek, a March 8, 1781 revolutionary war skirmish that took place here
- Causey's Mill, a historic mill built in 1866 in this area
- Statue of Leif Erikson (Reykjavík), statue visible from the lake and surrounding trail
