= Skirmish at Waters Creek =

Military action in 1781

- Part of the American Revolutionary War
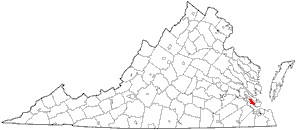
- The approximate location in the state of Virginia where the skirmish occurred.
Date	March 8, 1781
Location	Newport News, Virginia 37.040997°N 76.486695°W
Result	American victory

Belligerents
United States	Great Britain

Commanders and leaders
Francis Mallory †	Thomas Dundas

Strength
c. 40	300–400

Casualties and losses
7 killed 4 captured	2 killed 2 wounded

The Skirmish at Waters Creek was a minor action fought on March 8, 1781, during the American Revolutionary War. It was fought near Waters Creek in Newport News, Virginia between a group of local Patriot militia and British Army troops.

== Background ==
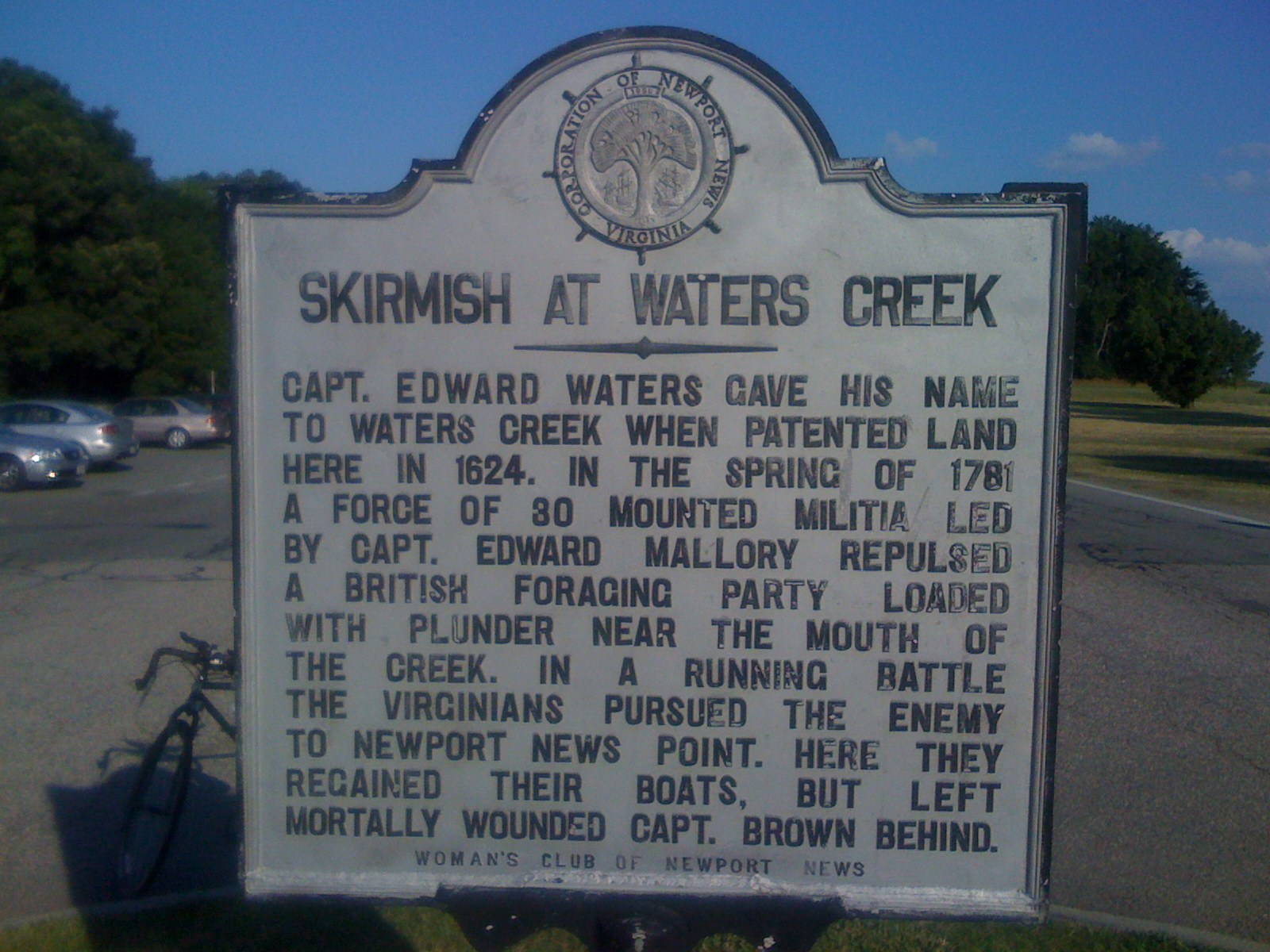
A historical sign with information about the skirmish

The state of Virginia had not been the scene of significant military activity for most of the American Revolutionary War. This began to change with the arrival in October 1780 of 2,500 British Army troops under Brigadier General Alexander Leslie. These troops established a fortified position at Portsmouth, and began raiding the area for supplies. However, they were ordered to abandon the post by Lieutenant General Charles, Earl Cornwallis in November. In January 1781 another 1,600 troops, this time under the command of the traitor Benedict Arnold, arrived in Virginia. After making a lightning raid on the state capital, Richmond, Arnold and his men settled into winter quarters at Portsmouth.

Arnold's presence at Portsmouth was monitored by local Patriot militia, which turned out to respond to raiding and supply expeditions that he sent out. Early on March 8, Arnold sent about 300 men on a raiding expedition to the Newport News area. They were led by Lieutenant Colonel Thomas Dundas, leader of the regiment known as the Royal Edinburgh Volunteers, and included a company of men from John Graves Simcoe's Queen's Rangers.

When the militia were alerted to Dundas' expedition, Colonel Francis Mallory, a resident of Hampton, organized the opposition. Mallory had recently been released from a brief imprisonment on board a Royal Navy ship as part of a prisoner exchange, and had been warned against taking up arms again. Intelligence gained during this time led him to conclusions about the likely route of the expedition, so he tried to set up an ambush at a place called Tompkins' Bridge, crossing the creek between Hampton and York County.

== Skirmish ==
The militiamen divided their forces with the cavalry leading the charge from the front while the infantry fired from the flank. Colonel Mallory himself was killed in the attack, after being wounded by shot, saber and bayonet. The militiamen were able to hold off the British forces, forcing them to retreat to Newport News point and eventually their boats. While retreating, Captain Brown was injured and left behind.

== General and cited references ==
- Maxwell, William, ed. (1850). The Virginia Historical Register and Literary Note Book. Vol. III. Richmond, Virginia: MacFarlane & Ferguson.
- Quarstein, John V.; Rouse, Parke S. Jr. (1996). Finneran, Elisa F. (ed.). Newport News: A Centennial History. Conner, Edward A. (1st ed.). Newport News, Virginia: City of Newport News. p. 23. LCCN 96-71877. OCLC 36378085.
- Randall, Willard Sterne (1990). Benedict Arnold: Patriot and Traitor. New York: William Morrow and Company. ISBN 1-55710-034-9. LCCN 90-5656. OCLC 1485045894.
- Rouse, Parke S. Jr. (1969). Endless Harbor: The Story of Newport News (1st ed.). Franklin Printing Company. p. 11. LCCN 75-92458.
