= List of maritime museums in the United States =

List of maritime museums in the United States is a sortable list of American museums which display objects related to ships and water travel. Many of these maritime museums have museum ships in their collections. Member museums of the Council of American Maritime Museums (CAMM) are indicated in the last column.

Museum ships not affiliated with a museum appear on a separate list of museum ships.

== Table ==
State	City	Museum	Link	CAMM
Alabama	Mobile	Battleship Memorial Park		
Alabama	Mobile	National Maritime Museum of the Gulf of Mexico		
Alaska	Kodiak	Kodiak Maritime Museum		
Arkansas	Little Rock	Arkansas Inland Maritime Museum		
California	Dana Point	Orange County Marine Institute		
California	Alameda	USS Hornet Museum		
California	China Lake	Naval Museum of Armament & Technology		
California	Homewood	Tahoe Maritime Museum		
California	Los Angeles	Battleship USS Iowa Museum		
California	Los Angeles	Los Angeles Maritime Museum		
California	Monterey	Monterey Maritime and History Museum		Y
California	Morro Bay, California	Morro Bay Maritime Museum		
California	Newport Beach	Newport Harbor Maritime Museum		Y
California	Oxnard	Channel Islands (Ventura County) Maritime Museum		
California	Port Hueneme	US Navy SeaBee Museum		
California	Richmond	Rosie the Riveter National Historic Site		
California	Samoa	Humboldt Bay Maritime Museum		
California	San Diego	San Diego Maritime Museum		Y
California	San Francisco	San Francisco Maritime National Historic Park		Y
California	San Francisco	San Francisco Maritime National Park Association, USS Pampanito		Y
California	San Francisco	National Liberty Ship Memorial		
California	San Pedro	Los Angeles Maritime Museum		
California	Santa Barbara	Santa Barbara Maritime Museum		Y
California	Sausalito	Spaulding Wooden Boat Center		
California	Vallejo	Vallejo Naval and Historical Museum		
Connecticut	Bridgeport	Captain's Cove Seaport		
Connecticut	Essex Village	Connecticut River Museum		Y
Connecticut	Groton	U.S. Navy Submarine Force Museum		
Connecticut	Mystic	Mystic Seaport Museum		Y
Connecticut	New London	Custom House Maritime Museum		
Connecticut	New London	US Coast Guard Museum		Y
Delaware	Fenwick Island	Discover Sea Shipwreck Museum		
Delaware	Georgetown	Treasures of the Sea		
Delaware	Lewes	Cannonball House and Marine Museum		
Delaware	Lewes	United States lightship Overfalls (LV-118)		
Delaware	Rehoboth Beach	Indian River Lifesaving Station Museum		
Delaware	Wilmington	Kalmar Nyckel Foundation		Y
District of Columbia	Washington, DC	National Museum of the United States Navy		Y
District of Columbia	Washington, DC	Naval History & Heritage Command		
District of Columbia	Washington, DC	Navy Art Collection		
Florida	Apalachicola	Apalachicola Maritime Museum		
Florida	Daytona Beach	Daytona Maritime Museum		
Florida	DeLand	DeLand Naval Air Station Museum		
Florida	Fort Pierce	National Navy UDT-SEAL Museum		
Florida	Jacksonville	Jacksonville Maritime Heritage Center		
Florida	Key West	Key West Shipwreck Historeum Museum		
Florida	Key West	Lighthouse Museum & Keepers Quarters Museum		
Florida	Key West	Mel Fisher Maritime Heritage Museum		
Florida	Fort Lauderdale	Naval Air Station Fort Lauderdale Museum		
Florida	Panama City Beach	Man in the Sea Museum		
Florida	Pensacola	National Naval Aviation Museum		
Florida	St. Augustine	St. Augustine Light		
Florida	St. Augustine	The Lyons Maritime Museum		
Florida	Sebastian	Mel Fisher's Treasure Museum		
Florida	Seminole	Panama Canal Museum		Y
Florida	Stuart	House of Refuge at Gilbert's Bar		
Florida	Stuart	Maritime & Yachting Museum		
Florida	Tampa	SS American Victory Mariners Museum		
Florida	Vero Beach	McLarty Treasure Museum		
Florida	West Palm Beach	Palm Beach Maritime Museum		
Georgia	Athens	Navy Supply Corps Museum		
Georgia	Columbus	National Civil War Naval Museum		
Georgia	St. Marys	St. Marys Submarine Museum		
Georgia	St. Simons Island	St. Simons Island Lighthouse Museum		
Georgia	Savannah	Ships of the Sea Maritime Museum		Y
Hawaii	Honolulu	Hawaii Maritime Center		Y
Hawaii	Lahaina	Whalers Village Museum		
Hawaii	Pearl Harbor	USS Bowfin Submarine Museum & Park		
Illinois	Chicago	Chicago Maritime Museum		
Illinois	Naval Station Great Lakes	Great Lakes Naval Museum		
Indiana	Delphi	Wabash & Erie Canal Interpretive Center		
Indiana	Jeffersonville	Howard Steamboat Museum		
Indiana	Michigan City	Old Michigan City Light		
Iowa	Dubuque	National Mississippi River Museum & Aquarium		
Iowa	Keokuk	George M. Verity River Museum		
Kansas	Olathe	Old Olathe Naval Air Museum		
Kansas	Wichita	Wichita Boathouse		
Kentucky	Paducah	River Heritage Museum		
Louisiana	Baton Rouge	USS Kidd Veterans Museum		
Louisiana	Madisonville	Maritime Museum Louisiana		
Louisiana	Plaquemine	Plaquemine Lock State Historic Site		
Louisiana	Lake Charles	USS Orleck Naval Museum		
Maine	Bath	Maine Maritime Museum		Y
Maine	Bristol	Fisherman's Museum		
Maine	Cape Elizabeth	Portland Head Light		
Maine	Eastport	Quoddy Maritime Museum		
Maine	Georgetown	Seguin Island Light Station		
Maine	Greenville	Moosehead Marine Museum		
Maine	Kittery	Kittery Historical and Naval Museum		
Maine	Northeast Harbor	Great Harbor Maritime Museum		
Maine	Port Clyde	Marshall Point Lighthouse Museum		
Maine	Portland	Portland Harbor Museum		Y
Maine	Rockland	Maine Lighthouse Museum		
Maine	Rockland	Museum of Maritime Pets		
Maine	Searsport	Penobscot Marine Museum		Y
Maine	Swan's Island	Swan's Island Lobster & Marine Museum		
Maine	Thomaston	Maine Watercraft Museum		
Maryland	Annapolis	Annapolis Maritime Museum		
Maryland	Annapolis	U.S. Naval Academy Museum		Y
Maryland	Baltimore	Baltimore Maritime Museum		
Maryland	Baltimore	Frederick Douglas Isaac Myers Maritime Park		
Maryland	Baltimore	Fells Point Maritime Museum		Y
Maryland	Cambridge	Richardson Maritime Museum		
Maryland	Chesapeake City	Chesapeake and Delaware Canal Museum		
Maryland	Havre de Grace	Havre de Grace Maritime Museum		
Maryland	North East	Upper Bay Museum		
Maryland	Ocean City	Ocean City Life-Saving Station		
Maryland	Patuxent River	Patuxent River Naval Air Museum		
Maryland	Piney Point	Piney Point Lighthouse Museum		
Maryland	Rock Hall	Waterman's Museum		
Maryland	St. Michaels	Chesapeake Bay Maritime Museum		Y
Maryland	Shady Side	Captain Salem Avery House Museum		
Maryland	Solomons	Calvert Marine Museum		Y
Maryland	West Denton	Joppa Wharf Museum		
Massachusetts	Barnstable	Coast Guard Heritage Museum		
Massachusetts	Billerica	Middlesex Canal Museum		
Massachusetts	Boston	Boston Marine Museum		
Massachusetts	Boston	Boston Tea Party Ships and Museum		
Massachusetts	Boston	USS Constitution Museum		
Massachusetts	Cambridge	Hart Nautical Gallery		Y
Massachusetts	Charlestown	Charlestown Navy Yard		
Massachusetts	Cohasset	Cohasset Historical Society's Maritime Museum		
Massachusetts	Essex	Essex Shipbuilding Museum		Y
Massachusetts	Fall River	Battleship Cove		
Massachusetts	Fall River	Marine Museum at Fall River		
Massachusetts	Gloucester	Gloucester Maritime Heritage Center		
Massachusetts	Gloucester	Cape Ann Museum		
Massachusetts	Hull	Hull Lifesaving Museum		Y
Massachusetts	Hyannis	Cape Cod Maritime Museum		
Massachusetts	Indian Orchard	Titanic Museum		
Massachusetts	Nantucket	Nantucket Historical Association		Y
Massachusetts	Nantucket	Nantucket Shipwreck and Lifesaving Museum		Y
Massachusetts	New Bedford	New Bedford Whaling Museum		Y
Massachusetts	Newburyport	Custom House Maritime Museum		
Massachusetts	Osterville	Crosby Boat Yard		
Massachusetts	Provincetown	Whydah Museum		
Massachusetts	Quincy	United States Naval Shipbuilding Museum		
Massachusetts	Salem	Peabody Essex Museum		Y
Massachusetts	Salem	Salem Maritime National Historic Site		Y
Massachusetts	Scituate	Maritime and Irish Mossing Museum		
Massachusetts	Truro	Cape Cod Highland Light		
Michigan	Alpena	Great Lakes Maritime Heritage		
Michigan	Cedarville	Les Cheneaux Maritime Museum		
Michigan	Copper Harbor	Copper Harbor Lighthouse		
Michigan	Detroit	Dossin Great Lakes Museum		
Michigan	Douglas	Keewatin Maritime Museum		
Michigan	Eagle Harbor	Eagle Harbor Light		
Michigan	Glen Arbor	Sleeping Bear Point Lifesaving Station		
Michigan	Glen Haven	Cannery Boathouse Museum		
Michigan	Grand Marais	Grand Marais Maritime Museum or Pictured Rocks Nautical and Maritime Museum		
Michigan	Gulliver	Seul Choix Light		
Michigan	Harrisville	Sturgeon Point Light		
Michigan	Marquette	Marquette Maritime Museum		
Michigan	Muskegon	USS Silversides Submarine Museum		
Michigan	Northport	Grand Traverse Light		
Michigan	Paradise	Great Lakes Shipwreck Museum		
Michigan	Port Hope	Pointe aux Barques Light		
Michigan	Rogers City	Great Lakes Lore Maritime Museum		
Michigan	Sault Ste. Marie	River of History Museum		
Michigan	Sault Ste. Marie	Soo Locks Visitor Center		
Michigan	South Haven	Michigan Maritime Museum		Y
Michigan	White Hall	White River Light		
Minnesota	Alexandria	Minnesota Lakes Maritime Museum		
Minnesota	Duluth	Lake Superior Maritime Visitor Center		
Minnesota	Tofte	North Shore Commercial Fishing Museum		
Minnesota	Two Harbors	Split Rock Light		
Mississippi	Biloxi	Maritime and Seafood Industry Museum		
Missouri	Branson	The Titanic Museum		
Missouri	Kansas City	Steamboat Arabia Museum		
Nebraska	Brownville	Museum of Missouri River History		
Nebraska	Omaha	Freedom Park Navy Museum		
New Hampshire	Portsmouth, New Hampshire	USS Albacore (AGSS-569)		
New Hampshire	Moultonborough	New Hampshire Boat Museum		
New Jersey	Beach Haven	Museum of New Jersey Maritime History		
New Jersey	Camden	Battleship New Jersey Museum and Memorial		
New Jersey	Greenwich Township	John DuBois Maritime Museum		
New Jersey	Hackensack	New Jersey Naval Museum		
New Jersey	Linwood	Jim Kirk Maritime Museum		
New Jersey	Lower Township	Naval Air Station Wildwood Aviation Museum		
New Jersey	Point Pleasant	New Jersey Museum of Boating		
New Jersey	Toms River	Toms River Seaport Society Maritime Museum		Y
New Jersey	Tuckerton	Tuckerton Seaport		Y
New York	Buffalo	Buffalo and Erie County Naval & Military Park		
New York	Buffalo	Lower Lakes Marine Historical Society		
New York	Buffalo	Buffalo Maritime Center		
New York	Cape Vincent	Tibbetts Point Light		
New York	Chittenango	Chittenango Landing Boat Museum		
New York	Clayton	Antique Boat Museum		Y
New York	Cold Spring Harbor	Cold Spring Harbor Whaling Museum		Y
New York	Dunkirk	Dunkirk Light		
New York	East Hampton	East Hampton Town Marine Museum		Y
New York	Greenport	East End Seaport Maritime Museum		Y
New York	Hammondsport	Finger Lakes Boating Museum		
New York	High Falls	Delaware and Hudson Canal Museum		
New York	Kings Point	American Merchant Marine Museum		Y
New York	Kingston	Hudson River Maritime Museum		Y
New York	Lockport	Erie Canal Discovery Center		
New York	Montauk Point	Montauk Point Light		
New York	New York City	City Island Nautical Museum		
New York	New York City	Intrepid Sea-Air-Space Museum		
New York	New York City	Maritime Industry Museum		
New York	New York City	New Netherland Museum		
New York	New York City	Museum of Maritime Navigation and Communication		
New York	New York City	Noble Maritime Collection		
New York	New York City	South Street Seaport Museum		Y
New York	New York City	Waterfront Museum		
New York	Oswego	H. Lee White Marine Museum		
New York	Sag Harbor	Sag Harbor Whaling Museum		
New York	Skenesborough	Skenesborough Museum		
New York	Sodus Point	Sodus Point Light		
New York	West Sayville	Long Island Maritime Museum		Y
New York	Syracuse	Erie Canal Museum		Y
North Carolina	Beaufort	North Carolina Maritime Museum		Y
North Carolina	Hatteras	Graveyard of the Atlantic Museum		Y
North Carolina	Manteo	North Carolina Maritime Museum on Roanoke Island		
North Carolina	Rodanthe	Chicamacomico Life-Saving Station		
North Carolina	Southport	North Carolina Maritime Museum at Southport		
North Carolina	Wilmington	North Carolina Battleship Memorial		
Ohio	Ashtabula	Ashtabula Maritime Museum		
Ohio	Fairport Harbor	Fairport Harbor Marine Museum and Lighthouse		
Ohio	Marietta	Ohio River Museum		
Ohio	Sandusky	Maritime Museum of Sandusky		
Ohio	Toledo	National Museum of the Great Lakes		
Ohio	Vermilion	Inland Seas Maritime Museum		Y
Oklahoma	Catoosa	Arkansas River Historical Society Museum		
Oregon	Astoria	Columbia River Maritime Museum		Y
Oregon	North Bend	Coos Historical & Maritime Museum		
Oregon	Port Orford	Port Orford Lifeboat Station		
Oregon	Portland	Oregon Maritime Museum		
Pennsylvania	Erie	Erie Maritime Museum		Y
Pennsylvania	Philadelphia	Independence Seaport Museum		Y
Pennsylvania	Philadelphia	Philadelphia Ship Preservation Guild		
Rhode Island	Bristol	Herreshoff Marine Museum		Y
Rhode Island	Newport	Museum of Yachting		Y
Rhode Island	Newport	Naval War College Museum		
Rhode Island	Warwick	Steamship Historical Society of America		Y
South Carolina	Charleston	Patriots Point Naval and Maritime Museum		Y
Tennessee	Memphis	Mississippi River Museum		
Texas	Corpus Christi	USS Lexington on the Bay Museum		
Texas	Fredericksburg	Chester Nimitz Museum of the Pacific War		
Texas	Galveston	Seawolf Park		
Texas	Galveston	Texas Seaport Museum		Y
Texas	Galveston	Ocean Star Offshore Drilling Rig & Museum		
Texas	Houston	Houston Maritime Museum		
Texas	Rockport	Texas Maritime Museum		
Vermont	Vergennes	Lake Champlain Maritime Museum		Y
Virginia	Deltaville	Deltaville Maritime Museum		Y
Virginia	Irvington	Steamboat Era Museum		
Virginia	Kinsale	Kinsale Maritime Museum		
Virginia	Mathews	Mathews Maritime Museum		
Virginia	Morattico	Morattico Maritime Museum		
Virginia	Newport News	Mariners' Museum and Park, the official National Maritime Museum		Y
Virginia	Norfolk	Hampton Roads Naval Museum		Y
Virginia	Portsmouth	Portsmouth Naval Shipyard Museum		Y
Virginia	Quantico	National Museum of the Marine Corps		
Virginia	Reedville	Reedville Fisherman's Museum		Y
Virginia	Virginia Beach	Virginia Beach Surf & Rescue Museum		Y
Virginia	Yorktown	Waterman’s Museum		
Washington	Aberdeen	Grays Harbor Historical Seaport		
Washington	Anacortes	Anacortes History Museum		Y
Washington	Bellingham	Bellingham International Maritime Museum		
Washington	Blaine	Semiahmoo Park Maritime Museum		
Washington	Bremerton	Puget Sound Navy Museum		
Washington	Keyport	Naval Undersea Museum		
Washington	Raymond	Willapa Seaport Museum		
Washington	Seattle	Center for Wooden Boats		Y
Washington	Seattle	Coast Guard Museum/Northwest		
Washington	Seattle	Northwest Seaport		Y
Washington	Seattle	Odyssey Maritime Discovery Center		
Washington	Seattle	Puget Sound Maritime Historical Society		Y
Washington	Tacoma	Working Waterfront Maritime Museum		
Washington	Westport	Westport Maritime Museum		Y
West Virginia	Point Pleasant	Point Pleasant River Museum		
Wisconsin	Bayfield	Bayfield Maritime Museum		
Wisconsin	Gills Rock	Gills Rock Museum		
Wisconsin	Manitowoc	Wisconsin Maritime Museum		Y
Wisconsin	Milwaukee	Milwaukee Maritime Center		
Wisconsin	Milwaukee	Wisconsin Marine Historical Society		
Wisconsin	Port Washington	Port Washington Historical Society Light House Museum		
Wisconsin	Sturgeon Bay	Door County Maritime Museum		Y
New York	New York City	Lilac Preservation Project	[278]	

== See also ==
- U.S. Navy museums
