= Channel Islands Maritime Museum =

Maritime museum in California

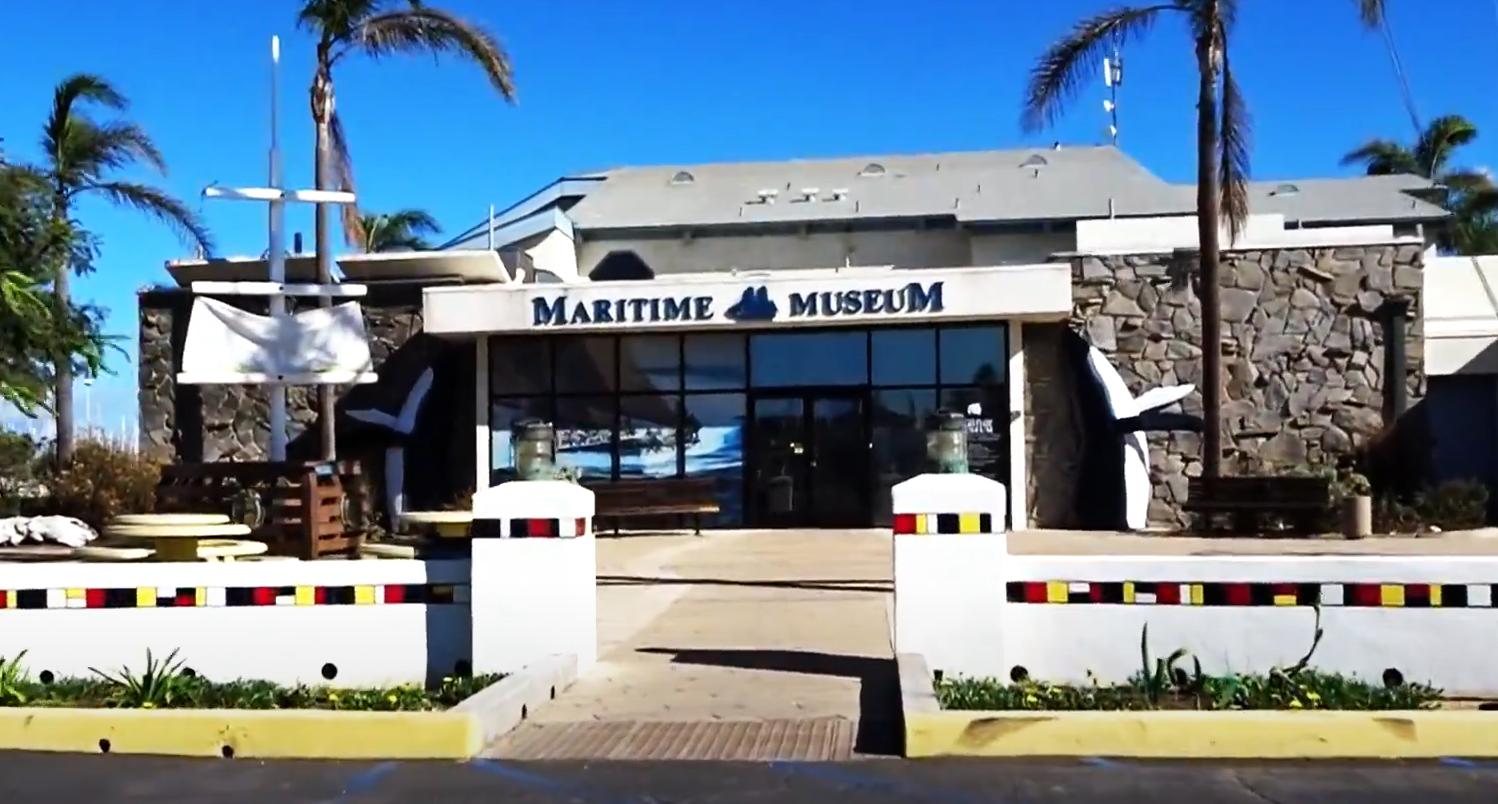
- The exterior of the museum in 2017

- Location within California Location within the United States
- Former name: Ventura County Maritime Museum
- Established: 1991
- Location: 3900 Bluefin Cir, Oxnard, CA 93035
- Coordinates: 34.1650°N 119.2263°W
- Type: Maritime museum
- Accreditation: CAMM, NARM
- Founders: Harry Nelson; Martin V. "Bud" Smith
- Executive director: Doug Riffenburgh
- Curator: Olivia Williamson
- Website: www.cimmvc.org

The Channel Islands Maritime Museum, formerly the Ventura County Maritime Museum, is a maritime museum in Oxnard, California, adjacent to Channel Islands Harbor. It was founded in 1991 and contains art galleries and sea-themed exhibitions.

== History ==
The museum was founded in 1991, by Harry Nelson and Martin V. "Bud" Smith. Nelson was an attorney, businessman, and art collector focusing on marine subjects, and Smith was an urban developer. They had wanted to find a way to display Nelson's collection and add a cultural attraction to the Channel Islands Harbor. To fund the museum, Nelson created a board of trustees in 1988 and became the chairman. It was originally located at the city's Fisherman's Wharf and was called the Ventura County Maritime Museum. Nelson died in 2002. Still, he founded the Nelson Maritime Arts Foundation to make sure the museum was kept funded. The museum moved out of Fisherman's Wharf and was given its current name in 2012. The building it occupies was formerly a restaurant. Hiring a company to move all the artifacts would be very expensive, so volunteers did it themselves.

== Exhibits ==
The museum has two art galleries: one of local artists and another of European seascape paintings from 1600 to 1850. It also offers exhibitions on the Chumash peoples, the wreck of La Jenelle, whales, the Age of Discovery, the Port of Hueneme, the evolution of ships in America, the maritime history of Asia, ships during the Napoleonic Wars, Horatio Nelson, and ship model maker Edward Marple. The museum has the second-largest collection of bone ships made by prisoners of war during the Napoleonic Wars in the U.S. More than seventy model ships are displayed at the museum. During many different events, docents give presentations on exhibits in the character of people from the period they are talking about.
