= Seaport Museum =

- Independence Seaport Museum in Philadelphia, Pennsylvania
- Mystic Seaport in Mystic, Connecticut
- South Street Seaport Museum in Manhattan

== See also ==
- Maritime museum
- List of maritime museums in the United States
