= Stephen Montague =

American musician (born 1943)

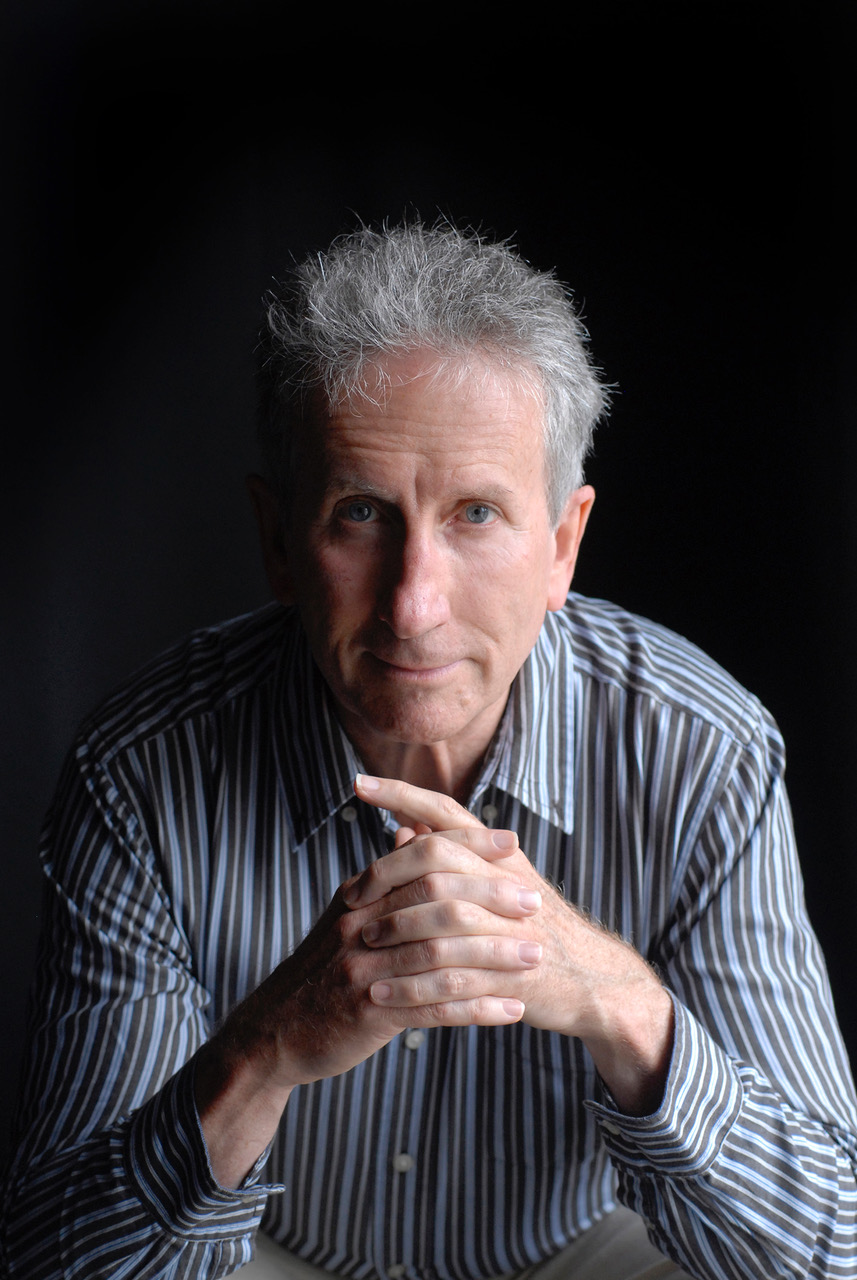
- Born: 10 March 1943 (age 83); Syracuse, New York, United States
- Website: stephenmontague.com

Stephen Rowley Montague (born March 10, 1943, in Syracuse, New York) is an American composer, pianist and conductor who grew up in Idaho, New Mexico, West Virginia and Florida.

== Musical statement ==
"I write music to engage an audience, to seduce them sometimes by stealth with something they know, then taking them somewhere they may never have been.

I'm a maverick and, like Henry Cowell, want to live in the whole world of music, not just one corner. My works range from the simple vernacular through high classical to the avant-garde. Variety is my oxygen."

~ Stephen Montague

== Background ==
Born in Syracuse, New York in 1943, Stephen Montague lived in Albion, Idaho, from 1947 to 1951, where his father, Dr. Richard Montague (1916–2015) was head of music at Southern Idaho College of Education. From 1952 to 1957, they lived in Fairmont, West Virginia, where his father was a professor of music at Fairmont State College, now University, and went on to become professor of music at St. Petersburg College, Florida, from 1959 to 1982. Stephen Montague's brother Dr. John Montague (born 1944) is director of Buffalo Maritime Center, New York.

== Education ==
After studying piano, conducting and composition at Florida State University B.M 1965 with Honors, M.M 1967, Stephen Montague received a Doctor of Musical Arts in composition from Ohio State University in 1972. He did additional study in conducting at the Mozarteum, Salzburg, Austria, 1966, computer music at IRCAM, Paris, 1981, and at Stanford University, California, 1984. He was awarded a Fulbright Fellowship/Polish Cultural Grant to work at the Experimental Music Studio of Polish Radio, Warsaw, Poland, 1972–74.

== Career ==
Montague was born and educated in the US, but lived in Warsaw, Poland (1972–74) on a Fulbright Fellowship, and since 1974 in London working as a freelance composer, pianist, conductor touring worldwide. His music has been performed at numerous international festivals, including the BBC Proms at the Royal Albert Hall in London, Royal Festival Hall, the Warsaw Autumn festival, the Paris Festival d'Automne, the Kennedy Center in Washington, D.C., Bang On a Can (NYC), Adelaide, Hong Kong and Singapore Festivals.

He has been commissioned by such sources as the BBC Proms, the Royal Festival Hall (London), Barbican Centre (London), New Music Biennale (UK), Birmingham Royal Ballet (UK), the National Portrait Gallery (London), the Royal Ballet (UK), British Telecom (for the London Symphony Orchestra), the Trans Atlantic Arts Consortium (UK/US), the Calgary Philharmonic (Canada), the Bournemouth Symphony Orchestra, BBC Symphony Chorus, the Hilliard Ensemble, the Smith Quartet (UK), pianist Stephen Kovacevich, percussionist Evelyn Glennie, harpsichordist Elisabeth Chojnacka, the International Computer Music Association and the Changwon International Chamber Music Festival (South Korea).

As a pianist, he has recorded for many European radio networks and has performed at Carnegie Hall in New York, the Queen Elizabeth Hall in London, and the Centre Georges Pompidou in Paris. In 1985 he formed a duo with pianist Philip Mead, Montague/Mead Piano Plus which toured internationally. His conducting specialty is 20th- and 21st-century music and has included work with the Bournemouth Symphony Orchestra, London Sinfonietta, and City of London Sinfonia amongst others. In addition, Montague has created multi-channel electroacoustic sound environments in collaboration with the sculptor, Maurice Agis in Agis's large Colorspace and Dreamscape inflatable sculptures, and composed a number of music theatre works for outside spaces such as his Horn Concerto for klaxon horn soloist with an orchestra of automobiles, and [Bennett's Bike Concerto for piano soloist (World Superbike Champion, James Toesland), symphonic brass ensemble, percussion and 8 motorcycles for the 2007 World Superbike Championships, Brands Hatch Race Track (UK). He has organised and directed 13 John Cage - Musicircuses including John Cage Centennial celebration (2012) performances at English National Opera (The London Coliseum), the Old Royal Naval College (Greenwich) in 2012, Centre Pompidou-Metz (France) in 2016, and the FSU Museum of Fine Arts (Tallahassee, FL) 2019. He was the music director for the Royal Opening of The Francis Crick Institute (London) 2016, and organised and directed one of the international Merce Cunningham Centennial dance/music events at Florida State University in 2019.

Although a long-term British resident (dual national - US/UK since 2000) his compositional influences are transatlantic. He commented in a BBC radio interview: "I have lived in Britain since 1974 but my musical heroes remain American: I admire Charles Ives's unapologetic juxtaposition of vernacular music and the avant-garde, Henry Cowell's irreverent use of fist and arm clusters, the propulsive energy of minimalism, and John Cage's radical dictum that 'all sound is music'. And, like Henry Cowell, I want to live in the whole world of music, not just one corner. I am equally at home writing for a large professional symphony orchestras, chamber groups, solo works, ballet, contemporary dance, music theatre or experimental works like, for example, motorcycles, brass, percussion and piano".

In the UK, Montague was a founder of Sonic Arts Network in 1980, ran the Sonic Arts concert series at London's Institute for Contemporary Art from 1982 to 1986, served as chair of the SPNM (Society for the Promotion of New Music) during 1993–1997, and was associate composer with The Orchestra of St. Johns, Smith Square, London, 1995 - 97. He has been a guest professor at the University of Texas - Austin, 1992, 1995, 2000, at the University of Auckland, New Zealand in 1997, and visiting professor of composition at Florida State University 2018–19. Recent composer portraits of his music have taken place in London, New York, Chicago, Columbus (OH), Houston, Mexico City, Vienna, Budapest, and Singapore.

His awards include the International Piano Magazine Award: "Best Contemporary Piano Music Recording 2006" for the CD of his piano music Southern Lament on NMC label (UK), Fellow of Leeds College of Music (FLeedsCM), 2004, Honorary Fellow Trinity College of Music (HonFTCL), 2001, Ohio State University Distinguished Alumnus Award, 2000, "Distinction in Computer Music", Ars Electronica Prix, Linz, 1996, the Ernst von Dohnányi Citation for Excellence in Composition, 1995, and "First Prize" at the Bourges International Electroacoustic Music Competition (France) in 1994.

In addition to his freelance work Montague was the New Music Associate at Cambridge University's Kettle's Yard Art Gallery, 2010–2012 (UK) where he curated Kettle's Yard Gallery's monthly contemporary music series. He also teaches composition and orchestration (one day a week), at Trinity Laban Conservatoire of Music and Dance London, and is published by United Music Publishing (UK)

Montague's works appear on CDs from NMC Records (UK), Signum (UK), ASV Records (UK), Continuum (New Zealand), Centaur (US), Point Records (US), Starkland (US) and others.

== Works ==
Orchestral

- From the Ether (2014) orchestra
- The King Dances (2013–14) orchestra
- Invictus (2013) orchestra
- Lux in tenebrae (2009) large orchestra/chorus, 5 conductors
- Night Eternal (2008) strings, music box
- Night Tracks (2008) string ensemble
- Beyond the Stone Horizon (2006) chamber orchestra
- Intrada 1631 (2003) brass choir, 4 drummers, organ, woodwinds, surround strings, multiple triangles
- Snowscape (2001) string orchestra
- The Creatures Indoors (1996) narrator, chamber orchestra. Poems: Jo Shapcott
- Dark Sun - August, 1945 (1995) large orchestra, chorus, 3 radios
- Snakebite (1995) chamber orchestra
- Prologue (1984) orchestra
- From the White Edge of Phrygia (1984) orchestra
- At the White Edge of Phrygia (1983) chamber orchestra
- Sound Round (1973) orchestra, electronics

Concerto

- Ritual: Ode to Changwon (2017) prepared piano [inside], string orchestra, music box
- Phrygian Ferment (2011) harpsichord, strings, percussion, tape
- Bike Concerto (2007) solo piano, 8 motorcycles, 13 brass, 2 perc.
- Mephisto (2006–07) violin solo, chamber orchestra
- Disparate Dances (2002) flute, harp soloists, chamber orchestra
- Horn Concerto (1998) solo klaxon horn, orchestra of vintage automobiles
- Concerto for Piano and Orchestra (1997) piano, chamber orchestra
- A Toy Symphony (1999) 6 amateur soloists, chamber orchestra

Choral & Vocal

- Poor Baby Jesus (2017) SATB a cappella
- Wilful Chants (2010) chorus, symphonic brass choir, 2 percussionists
- Requiem: “The Trumpets Sounded Calling Them to the Other Side” (2009) soprano soloist, SATB chorus, orchestra, organ, 3 off stage percussion groups, fog horns
- The Poison Tree (2008) baritone, bell, piano. Text: William Blake
- Cage: Variations I for Stephen Montague (2004) realisation for SATB chorus
- The Carnal & the Crane (1998) soprano, baritone soloists, SATB chorus, organ, chamber or full orchestra
- I Wonder (2001) for soprano soloist, SATB chorus, organ, chamber or full orchestra
- Cantique de Noël (1996) Adophe Adam/S Montague for sop & baritone soloists, SATB chorus, organ, chamber or full orchestra
- Varshavian Autumn (1995) SATB chorus, chamber orchestra
- Wild Nights (1993) soprano, clarinet, viola, piano
- Boombox Virelai (1992) counter-tenor, tenor, baritone, bass
- Tigida Pipa (1983) SATB, wood blocks, claves, tape

Chamber

- Red Dawn (2020) violin, piano
- Paramell I (2018) version: muted trumpet, muted piano
- Introit & Flourish (2016) brass quintet, or brass choir, timpani, percussion
- Dead Cat Bounce (2014) ‘open score’ chamber group
- Three Fables (2014) for narrator, fl, vln, vla, vc, harp, perc
- A Dragon Flies (2012) for violin & piano
- Chorale for the Cauldrons of Hell (2005/2006) for large mixed ensemble
- The Hammer Hawk (2002) for piano, violin, viola (or vln), cello, optional double bass
- Folk Dances (2002) violin, piano
- Rim Fire (2002) for percussion quartet
- Philup Glass- a Lullaby for Wine Glasses (2001) 4 wine glasses, 2 performers
- Black ‘n Blues (2000) piano 4 hands, marimba, pillow
- March Militaire (1999) military marching band
- Thule Ultima (1999) woodwind quintet mouthpieces
- Behold a Pale Horse (1994) version: organ, 2tpts, 2hns, 2trbs, tuba
- Silence: John, Yvar & Tim (1994) prepared string quartet, prepared piano, 2 tapes, live-electronics
- String Quartet No. 1: in memoriam Barry Anderson & Tomasz Sikorski (1989-93) quartet, live electronics, tape
- Paramell VI (1981) solo piano, fl, cl, vlc or perc
- Paramell V (1981) 2 pianos
- Paramell I (1977) muted trombone, muted piano
- Eine Kleine Klangfarben Gigue (1976) keyboard, open instrumentation
- Quiet Washes (1974) 3 trombones 3 pianos, or harps
- Eyes of Ambush (1973) 1-5 instruments/voices, digital delay

Theatre

- A Birthday Party for Merce (2019) a theatre piece for 12 singers and 40 saxophones,
- A Dinner Party for John Cage (2012) music theatre work for 12 singers
- Musicircus (2012) 200 performers, English National Opera event
- Apparitions (2008) late night multi-media event for UK castles
- Texas Pulp Fiction (2000/rev 2018) 3 speakers playing cow bells, beer bottles
- Chew Chow Chatterbox (1998) 4 percussionists at dinner

Solo

- Berceuse (2018) for prepared piano
- Raga Capriccio (2017) for toy piano, tape
- Beguiled (2015) for piano
- Nun Mul (2014) for piano
- Almost a Lullaby (2004) for toy piano, music box
- Toccare Incandescent (2003) organ
- Dark Train Comin’ (2001) harpsichord
- Southern Lament (1997) piano
- Mira (1995) piano
- Mirabella- A Tarantella for Toy Piano (1995)
- Phrygian Tucket (1993) harpsichord, tape
- Aeolian Furies (1992) accordion
- Vlug (1992) flute, live-electronics, tape
- After Ives... (1991–93) solo piano, electronics, tape
- Behold a Pale Horse (1990) organ
- Tongues of Fire (1983–93) piano, stones, live electronics, tape
- Paramell Va (1981) solo piano
- Strummin’ (1975) piano strings, tape

Electronic

- Synthetic Swamp (1973-2000) concrète tape
- Bright Interiors (1992-2000) 8 channel sound environment, Dreamspace inflatable sculpture by Maurice Agis
- Slow Dance on a Burial Ground (1983–84) electronic tape
- Scythia (1981) electronic tape

Graphic Scores

- UnCaged: January, 2004 (2003) open instrumentation/voices
- Quartet (1982) graphic/text score
- Quintet (1978) graphic/ text score
- Trio (1978) graphic/text score

Ballet

- The King Dances (2013–14) orchestra
- Prologue (1984) orchestra
- From the White Edge of Phrygia (1984) orchestra

TV

- The West of the Imagination (1985) 6 part drama/documentary US TV series PBS/)/KERA-TV Dallas, Texas

== Career highlights ==
- 2018-19 Visiting Professor, Florida State University
- 2018 75th Birthday concert, ReSound Chamber Orchestra, Singapore
- 2018 75th Birthday, 6 orchestral/chamber concerts: St. John's, Smith Square, London
- 2017 Professor of Composition, Trinity Laban Conservatory, London
- 2016 Music Director, The Royal Opening, Francis Crick Institute, London, HM The Queen & Prince Philip
- 2016 Artistic Director, Musicircus, Centre Pompidou/Metz, France
- 2015 BBC TV 90 min. documentary: The King Who Invented Ballet. The King Dances: Sir David Bintley, choreographer, Stephen Montague, orchestral score
- 2012 Artistic Director, Musicircus, John Cage Centennial, English National Opera
- 2010 BBC Proms commission, Wilful Chants, BBC Symphony Chorus, symphonic brass, percussion
- 2010 Concert Director/New Music Associate, Kettle's Yard Gallery Concert Series, Cambridge University, UK, 2010–12
- 2009 Featured Composer: Wiener Musik Tage Austria
- 2008 Composer Portrait Concerts, International Festival of Contemporary Music, Morelia and Mexico City, Mexico
- 2006 Best New Piano Music Recording 2006 Award, International Piano Magazine
- 2004 Artistic Director, BBC Symphony - John Cage Weekend, Barbican Centre, London
- 2004 Honorary Fellow- Leeds College of Music [FLeedsCM]
- 2001 Honorary Fellow, Trinity College of Music, London [Hon FTCL]
- 2000 Distinguished Alumnus Award, Ohio State University, US
- 2000 Guest Professor, University of Texas – Austin
- 1999 Concert Director, Mixing Music monthly series, Birmingham, UK 1999-2001
- 1997 London Symphony Orchestra/BT commission, The Creatures Indoors
- 1997 Distinguished Visiting Professor, University of Auckland, NZ
- 1997 BBC Proms commission, Concerto for Piano and Orchestra
- 1995 Composer Associate, Orchestra of St. John's, Smith Square, London, 1995–97
- 1995 Guest Professor, University of Texas - Austin
- 1995 Ernst von Dohnanyi Citation for Excellence in Composition
- 1994 First Prize, International Competition for Electroacoustic Music, Bourges, France, String Quartet No. 1: in memoriam…
- 1993 Chairman, Society for the Promotion of New Music, UK, 1993–97
- 1992 Guest Professor, University of Texas - Austin
- 1990 Gian Carlo Menotti Artist-in-Residence, Charleston, South Carolina
- 1988 Winner, The London Dance and Performance Award for Outstanding Creative Achievement in Music, UK
- 1984 Artistic Director, Electroacoustic Music Association of Great Britain, 1984–89
- 1983 Fellow, The MacDowell Colony, Peterborough, New Hampshire, US
- 1982 Composer Bursary Award, IRCAM, Paris, France
- 1981 Fellow, The MacDowell Colony, Peterborough, New Hampshire, US
- 1980 Piano soloist, Josef Riedl Ensemble (Munich) 2 month South American tour
- 1976 Piano soloist, Anton Webern Chamber Ensemble, Venice Biennale, Italy
- 1972 Fulbright Fellowship Warsaw, Poland, 1972–74
- 1972 Winner, Delta Omicron Composition Award

== Discography ==
- 1984 Slow Dance on a Burial Ground (Lovely Music VR2041) complete LP of Montague works: Slow Dance on a Burial Ground, Paramell I, Paramell Va; James Fulkerson, trombone, Stephen Montague, piano/electronics
- 1994 Stephen Montague: Orchestral and Chamber Works (Continuum CCD 1061) complete CD of Montague works: From the White Edge of Phrygia, String Quartet No. 1, Haiku, Tigida Pipa; The Florida Orchestra, The Smith Quartet, Philip Mead, piano, Singcircle (Gregory Rose, director)
- 1997 Snakebite (ASV CD DCA 991) complete CD of works by Montague: Snakebite, At the White Edge of Phrygia, Varshavian Autumn, Behold a Pale Horse (with brass); The Orchestra & Chorus of St Johns Smith Square, John Lubbock, conductor
- 1997 CDCM Computer Music Series Vol. 25 (Centaur Records, Inc. CRC 2347) includes Montague: Silence: John, Yvar & Tim; The Smith Quartet, Philip Mead, piano
- 1997 The Art of the Toy Piano (Point Records/Philips Classics 465 345-2) includes Montague: Mirabella: a Tarantella for Toy Piano; Margaret Leng Tan
- 1999 The Drums of Summer: Live from Austria (Gallante GG1017) includes Montague: At the White Edge of Phrygia; SMU Chamber Orchestra
- 2000 Energy (Opus 111 OPS 1016) includes Montague: Phrygian Tucket; Elisabeth Chojnacka, harpsichord
- 2000 Guy Klucesvek: Free Range Accordion (Starkland ST-209) includes Montague: Aeolian Furies; Guy Klucesvek, accordion
- 2005 The Joy of Toy (Edition Eirelav 001) includes Montague: Almost a Lullaby; Isabel Ettenauer, toy pianos - Winner: Pasticcio Prize by Austrian Radio, 2005
- 2005 In Sunlight (NMC D098) includes Montague: Folk Dances; Madeleine Mitchell, violin, Andrew Ball, piano
- 2006 Southern Lament (NMC D118 ) Montague piano works; Philip Mead & Stephen Montague, pianists, Elysian Quartet, Monica Acosta voice, Nancy Ruffer, flute, London Sousa Band - Winner: Best New Piano Recording of 2006 - The International Piano Awards
- 2007 Ghost Stories (Signum Classics CD088) includes Montague: String Quartet No. 1: in memoriam…; The Smith Quartet
- 2008 NMC Songbook (NMC D150) various British works includes Montague: The Poison Tree; Stefan Loges, baritone, Ian Burnside, piano, Owen Gunnell, percussion
- 2012 A Doll’s House (Signum Classics SIGCD294 ) new works for percussion includes Montague: Rim Fire; Ensemble Bash
- 2014 Three Fables (NMC DL201406); Crawford Logan, narrator & Red Note Ensemble
- 2015 Pinks & Blues (McMaster Records) includes Montague: Songs of Childhood from After Ives…; Christina McMaster, piano

== Articles ==
- Frances Wilson: “Meet the Artist: Stephen Montague, Composer” an interview for The Cross-Eyed Pianist online music magazine publication. Feb 2018, UK
- Professor Martyn Harry's lecture series Liveness, Hybridity and Noise at Oxford University, UK: “At the White Edge…” - the Music of Stephen Montague presented by the composer, 22 Jan 2018 at St. Hilda's College, Oxford University.
- Laura Haapio-Kirk: Sound +: An interview with Composer Stephen Montague, 3 March 2012, soundcloud.com
- Tim Rutherford-Johnson: “Yanks in the UK” New Music Box, the magazine of the American Music Center, (New York), 13 Oct 2010
- John Bannon: Stephen Montague's "At the White Edge of Phrygia": A conductor's performance analysis (DMA dissertation, Scholarly Repository Library, University of Miami, Florida, US), 2004
- Stephen Johnson: MUSIC / Light on the trigger: Stephen Johnson on works by Stephen Montague and James Dillon - Arts & Entertainment - The Independent, 29 Mar 1993
