= Maritime Museum of Douala =

- Musée Maritime de Douala
- Location: Rue de l'Hôpital, Bonanjo, Douala, Cameroon
- Coordinates: 4.03862°N 9.68443°E
- Type: Maritime museum
- Collections: Maritime history of Cameroon

The Maritime Museum of Douala (French: Musée Maritime de Douala), also called the Maritime Museum of Bonanjo (French: Musée Maritime de Bonanjo), is a public museum in Douala, Cameroon.

== History ==
=== Project start ===
The Bonanjo Maritime Museum, a cultural center, has had three locations since its creation. It opened its doors in the 1980s at the corner of Rue du Tribunal in the neighborhood of Bonanjo. It later moved to Avenue de Gaulle in that neighborhood. In 1989, it closed following the inactivity of the National Shippers' Council of Cameroon (CNCC). To revive it, the CNCC returned to the port of Douala in 2006 under the leadership of Auguste Mbappe Penda. In 2009, he launched the project for its construction. Since December 17, 2013, it has had its third location in Douala, Bonanjo, on the Rue de l'Hôpital, not far from its supervisory body. Today, it aims to collect, preserve and disseminate the cultural heritage of the country's coast and to promote its history.

== Administration ==
=== Promoter, supervisory authority and management of the museum ===
The museum is managed by the CNNC, with Auguste Mbappé Penda as its director since 2006. Before 1989, the year it closed, Gutave Tchetgen was its director.

=== Financing ===
The museum, like the CNCC, is under the financial supervision of the Cameroonian Ministry of Finance.

== Architecture & Layout ==
=== Architecture ===
The building has a ship-like shape.
