= Marine Museum at Fall River =

- Location: 70 Water Street, Fall River, Massachusetts, United States
- Coordinates: 41.702779°N 71.163648°W
- Type: Maritime museum

The Maritime Museum at Battleship Cove, formerly the Marine Museum at Fall River in Fall River, Massachusetts, is a historical and nautical museum with memorabilia, artifacts, and ship models of the Fall River Line and RMS Titanic. The museum houses a diverse collection which includes more than 150 scale models, 30,000 photographs, videos, uniforms, audio recordings and more. The museum also hosts a Titanic exhibition, which includes a 28-foot (8.5-meter) long scale model of the RMS Titanic used in Twentieth-Century-Fox's 1953 film Titanic. The museum also houses models of the Fall River Line (which operated from 1847 to 1937), a fleet of steamships that carried passengers from New York City and Boston to summer homes in Newport. Other exhibits follow the history of steam power at sea. The museum also sponsors a regular program of special events. The museum's main gallery exhibition is entitled: Sails, Paddles, and Screws: the History of Maritime Travel and Culture; and the museum hosts temporary exhibitions as well as a Kid's Cove Fun Space.

== Notable items and exhibits ==
- A 28-foot model of RMS Titanic from the 1953 Twentieth Century Fox film
- A large scale model of HMS Bounty donated by Turner Broadcasting
- Replica rooms from steamships such as those of the Fall River Line
- Underwater archaeology exhibit about Robert Ballard's RMS titanic dive
- The Margot & Tom Cottrell Research Library
- Maritime objects from industries such as whaling, United Fruit, the Age of Exploration, and more
- Videos and photographs from the Wood's Hole Oceanographic Institution discovery expedition

== See also ==
- List of maritime museums in the United States
