= Tahoe Maritime Museum =

- Established: 1988
- Dissolved: 2020
- Location: Homewood, California
- Coordinates: 39.1598°N 120.1461°W
- Type: Maritime Museum
- Website: Tahoe Maritime Museum website

The Tahoe Maritime Museum was a maritime museum founded in 1988 and was dedicated to the preservation of the maritime history of Lake Tahoe. The Museum hosted a collection of photographs and artifacts that span Lake Tahoe's maritime history, and in 2008 opened a new facility in Homewood, California to exhibit its collection. The museum shutdown in 2020

The Tahoe Maritime Museum's collection included over 25 vessels, including examples of Gar Wood, Chris-Craft, Hackercraft, Besotes, and Dodge wooden runabouts and utility boats as well as boats owned and raced by Henry J. Kaiser. In addition, the Museum was also home to the Jevarian Outboard Motor collection, an excellent collection reflecting the diversity of outboard engines over the decades. On display were models from the early 1900s as well as an outboard motor made by the Indian Silver Arrow Company.

The museum also had in its collection Teaser, a 39.92 ft sweep-stakes runabout designed by George F. Crouch and built by Henry B. Nevins, that won a time trial against the 20th Century Limited in a race from New York City to Albany in 1925. The 20th Century Limited was considered the fastest train at that time. Teaser, speeding up the Hudson River, beat the record by more than an hour.

The museum was a member of the North American Reciprocal Museums program.

== See also ==
- List of maritime museums in the United States
