= Working Waterfront Maritime Museum =

Coordinates: 47.257847°N 122.437366°W

The Working Waterfront Maritime Museum is a Maritime Museum located in Tacoma, Washington, USA. The museum sits on the Thea Foss Waterway. Along with the Discovery Wharf Children's Activity Area, the WWMM is a part of the Foss Waterway Seaport, a 501c3 non-profit organization founded in 1996. In conjunction with the Foss Waterway Development Agency, the Seaport seeks private and public funds to support its mission statement. The Working Waterfront Maritime Museum is dedicated to creating "a permanent education and activity venue on the Tacoma waterfront".

== Mission and vision ==
The activities of the Working Waterfront Maritime Museum are governed by a mission statement which is as follows: "The mission of the Foss Waterway Seaport is to celebrate Tacoma's rich maritime heritage — past, present, and future." From the foundation of the current city to the modern day, a large part of Tacoma's commerce has depended on maritime industry. The museum also includes education on marine biology, pre-contact maritime culture, and recreational boating. The museum's vision statement reads as follows:

The development partners of this project — the Foss Waterway Seaport and the Foss Waterway Development Authority — are dedicated to creating a venue that will continue to bring the downtown waterfront to life as a place for everyone. When fully completed, the Seaport will be the most comprehensive maritime heritage and education center on the US west coast and the only authentic facility in the Pacific Northwest to showcase the region's maritime history in a location where that history actually took place[.]

The claim of authenticity is based on the history of the site (see below). This vision includes a broad visitor base, however the Maritime Museum features many exhibits and events geared towards children.

== Organizational structure ==
Like many non-profit museums, the WWMM is governed by a board of trustees. At the Working Waterfront Maritime Museum the regular board consists of 23 members, including a president, two vice-presidents and a treasurer. In addition, two members comprise the emeritus board.

The museum has five full-time staff members: an executive director, administrative manager, marketing and program manager, visual art producer, and facilities manager. The WWMM also depends on a large group of volunteers.

== History ==
The Maritime Museum began in the 1990s as "Life on the Sound," a project which attempted to increase community space available to "celebrate the art, culture, crafts and skills of Puget Sound's maritime community." In 1996 this was incorporated as a 501(c)(3) organization, then called the Commencement Bay Maritime Association. When the project's concept expanded beyond the museum itself, in 2005, it was renamed the Foss Waterway Seaport. The building is housed in the Puget Sound Freight Warehouse. At the center of the Maritime Museum is the historic Balfour Dock building, which served as a cargo wharf for over seven decades, until its closure in the 1970s. The museum has recently renovated this space to expand meeting space and exhibits.

== Audience ==
The vision statement (see above) of the museum describes their audience as "everyone." Many of their programs and exhibits are intended for children, which in turn drives their audience towards families. Many reviews of the museum also mention children's experiences. This is fairly common among many types of museums, however, and visitors will find adult-oriented content alongside that intended for children.

== Exhibitions ==
The Working Waterfront Maritime Museum has two primary exhibitions, "Back Yard to Big Time," and the "Balfour Dock Building." The museum also holds several exhibits of individual objects, including the James Robert Hanssen rowboat, Andrew Foss rowboats, Willits canoes, a model SS Tacoma, and a selection of early maritime photos. The museum houses ongoing boat restoration projects, which are on view. Tall ships also frequent the museum's dock on yearly festival rounds. Ten upcoming exhibits have been proposed by the development teams, descriptions of which are available through their website: Early Waterfront Life, Connecting Waterfront Communities, The Lumber Capital of the World, The Foss Story, Tacoma Ships, Our World Waterfront Link, International Shipping and Trade, Labor and the Working Waterfront, The Waterfront and the Environment, Balancing the Uses, and The Recreational Boat Building Business. These exhibits are still in development and dates have not been provided for their openings.

== Public programs ==
The Working Waterway Maritime Museum hosts one major public program designed to educate the public and foster community. During the summer, the museum hosts a weekly children's event called "Whoopee! It's Wednesday!" with weekly educational themes like individual histories or specific crafts related to local maritime industry. Admission is variable, based on the activities.

== Collections ==
The museum feature a number of historic boats (see Exhibits). Collections information is not available through the primary website. The absence of a full-time collections manager may indicate the museum does not hold a traditional collection of accessioned, permanent objects. This does not mean the Working Waterfront is not a museum, but it is closer to the ecomuseum tradition, instead of the classic cabinet of curiosities model.

== See also ==
- List of maritime museums in the United States
