= Apalachicola Maritime Museum =

Maritime museum in Apalachicola, Florida

Coordinates: 29.7258°N 84.9812°W

The Apalachicola Maritime Museum is located in Apalachicola in Franklin County, Florida. The museum offers historical and recreational boat tours, eco-tours, kayaking, sunset cruises, sailing, and visits to the area's barrier islands. The museum also covers the area's ecology. The Quark, a ketch designed by L. Francis Herreshoff, is a centerpiece of the museum's exhibitions. The museum also has a restored Apalachicola Boat Works, which operates as a boat-building and restoration facility. The museum is located at 103 Water Street.

== Mission ==
The Apalachicola Maritime Museum is a 501(c)(3) organization founded to celebrate and preserve the maritime history of Apalachicola in the form of a maritime museum, active sailing, boat building and restoration programs, educational programs and stewardship of ecosystems in the Apalachicola Chattahoochee Flint River System, the Apalachicola Bay and the Gulf Coastal regions which rely upon river outflows.

== See also ==
- List of maritime museums in the United States
