= USS Iowa Museum =

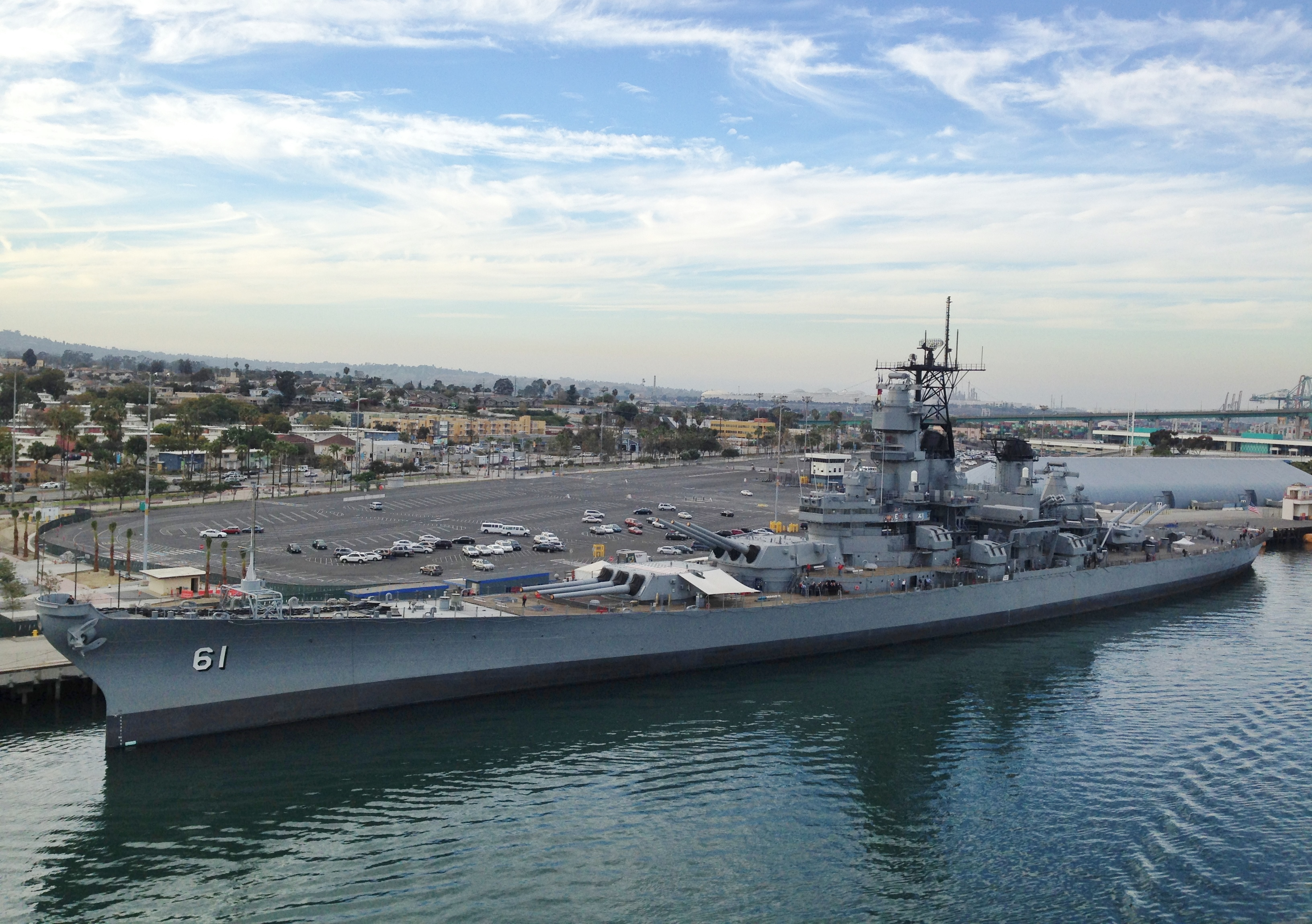
- Established: 2012
- Location: Port of Los Angeles, California; United States
- Coordinates: 33.7416°N 118.2775°W
- Type: Museum ship
- Parking: On-site
- Website: Pacific Battleship Center

The Battleship USS Iowa Museum is a maritime museum located at the Port of Los Angeles in San Pedro, Los Angeles, California, United States. The museum's main artifact is the USS Iowa (BB-61), lead ship of the Iowa class of battleships.

== History ==
USS Iowa (BB-61) was the lead ship of the last class of U.S. Navy battleships to be built by the United States. The battleship was originally commissioned in 1943, and served during World War II, the Korean War, and through the Cold War. Iowa earned 11 battle stars during her career and hosted three U.S. Presidents, ultimately earning the nicknames Battleship of Presidents and Big Stick. Iowa was awarded to the Pacific Battleship Center on September 6, 2011 for display at the Port of Los Angeles in San Pedro, California – home to the United States Battle Fleet from 1919 to 1940.

On October 27, 2011, the battleship was relocated from Suisun Bay Reserve Fleet to the Port of Richmond, California for painting and refurbishment. On May 27, 2012, Iowa was towed underneath the Golden Gate Bridge, on the bridge's 75th anniversary, for her final journey to Los Angeles. Iowa opened in Los Angeles on July 4, 2012 to a crowd of over 1,500 supporters and veterans at Port of Los Angeles Berth 87. The USS Iowa Museum offers daily tours, group programs, education visits, special events, filming, military ceremonies, and is in the process of starting an overnight program.

Daily tours include visits to see the largest guns (16"/50 caliber) on a U.S. Navy ship, officers ward room, President Roosevelt's cabin, armored bridge, missile decks, enlisted berthing, mess decks, helicopter deck, and other areas. The ship is located at the Los Angeles World Cruise Center, which has over 2,100 parking spaces available.

Iowa has played various roles in films and television series including NCIS: Los Angeles, American Warships, Bermuda Tentacles, The Rookie, and Dark Rising. Iowa is home to annual American-focused events including the City of Los Angeles Veterans Appreciation, a Memorial Day Celebration, and September 11 remembrance.

== See also ==
- National Museum of the United States Navy
- List of maritime museums in the United States
