= Maritime & Seafood Industry Museum =

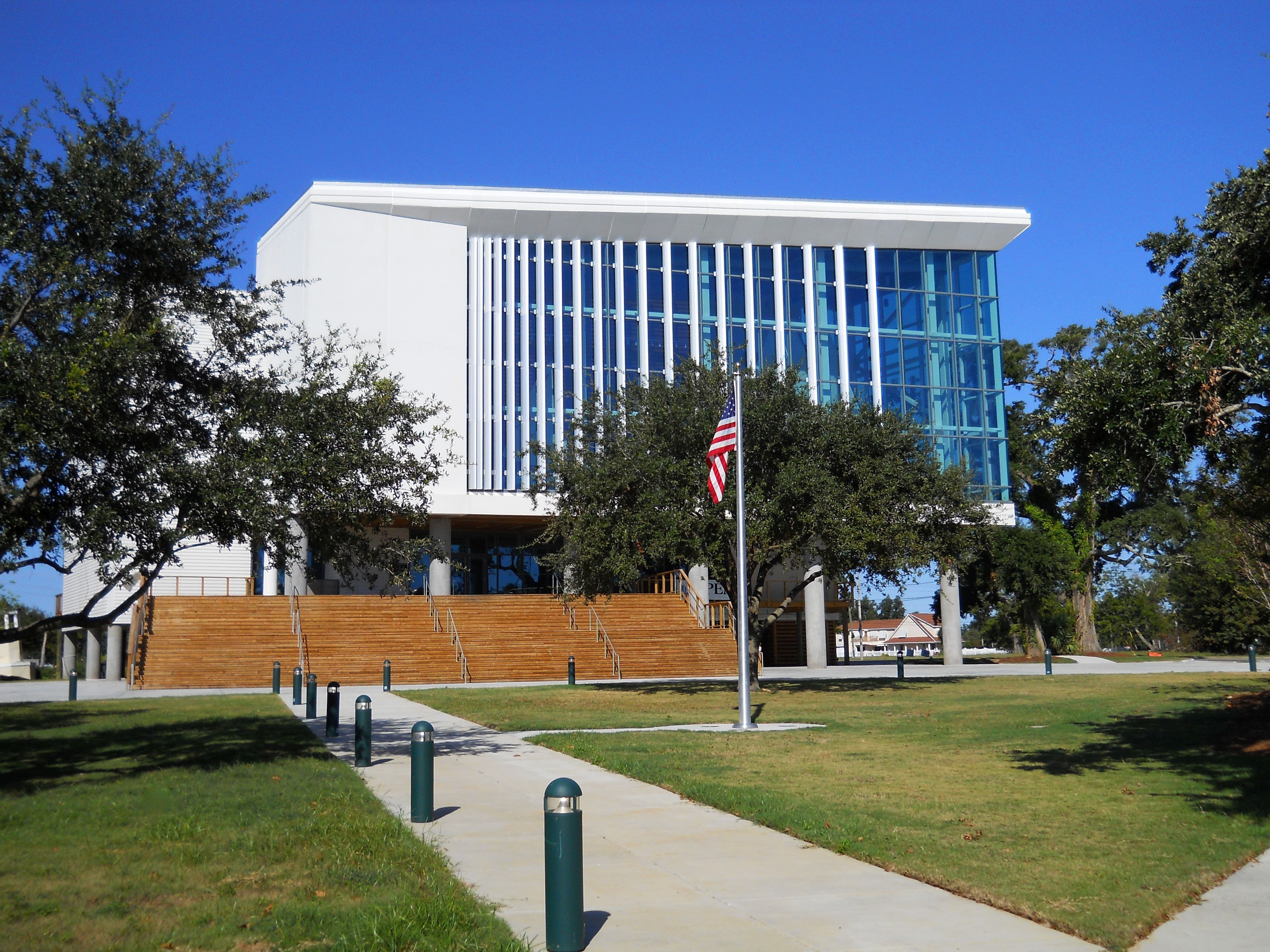
- Main façade of museum in 2014
- Established: 1986
- Location: Biloxi, Mississippi, USA
- Coordinates: 30.39306°N 88.85861°W
- Type: Maritime museum
- Director: Brandon Boudreaux
- Website: www.maritimemuseum.org

The Maritime & Seafood Industry Museum (MSIM) was established in 1986 to preserve and interpret the maritime history and heritage of Biloxi and the Mississippi Gulf Coast. It accomplishes this mission through an array of exhibits on shrimping, oystering, recreational fishing, wetlands, managing marine resources, charter boats, marine blacksmithing, wooden boat building, net-making, catboats/Biloxi skiff, shrimp peeling machine and numerous historic photographs and objects. The Wade Guice Hurricane Museum within the museum, featuring 1,400 square feet (130 m^{2}) of exhibit space and a state of the art theatre. The Museum has brought life to local maritime history and heritage by replicating two 65-ft two-masted Biloxi Schooners.

In August 2005, the Museum was destroyed by Hurricane Katrina. Nine years later, a newly constructed museum opened to the public.

== Programs ==
The Maritime & Seafood Industry Museum currently sponsors two programs annually, the Sea and Sail Adventure Camp and the Billy Creel Memorial Wooden Boat Show.

In the Sea and Sail Adventure Camp, children aged 6–12 are given experience of the history and heritage of the Mississippi Gulf Coast through sailing trips, fishing, maritime crafts, and seafood industry field trips.

The Billy Creel Memorial Wooden Boat Show presents the historic, antique, classic and contemporary wooden boats at the largest gathering of watercraft on the Mississippi Gulf Coast.

== Schooners ==
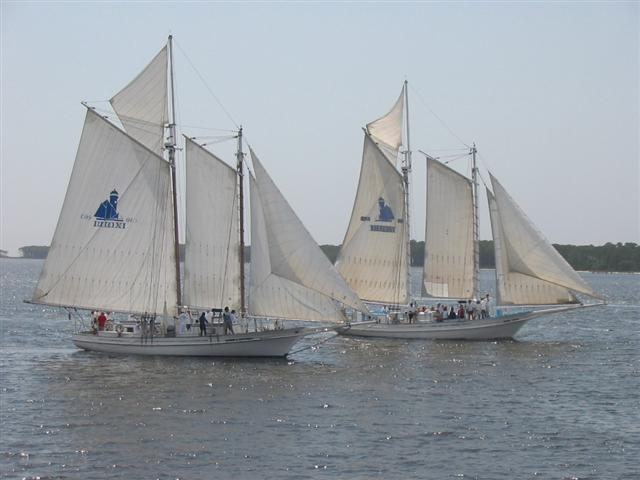
Glenn L. Swetman and Mike Sekul

The Maritime & Seafood Industry Museum has two replica oyster schooners, the Glenn L. Swetman and the Mike Sekul. These types of ships were used along the Gulf Coast from the late 1800s to the early 1900s. However, the introduction of marine engines and the changes in oyster harvesting laws resulted in their use to cease.

== Schooner Pier Complex ==
Completed in June 2006, the Schooner Pier Complex provides a home for the two Biloxi Schooner replicas, Glenn L. Swetman and Mike Sekul. The pier has three pavilions, storage area for schooner parts, handicapped accessible rest room facilities and a second story observation deck. It also has a marine pump out station and an area for a future gift shop and office area for schooner business.

== Reconstruction ==
On August 2, 2014, a new three-story museum, containing 20,000 ft^{2} (1,900 m^{2}), opened to the public.

== See also ==
- List of maritime museums in the United States
