= Legacy of the Lakes Museum =

Maritime museum in Minnesota

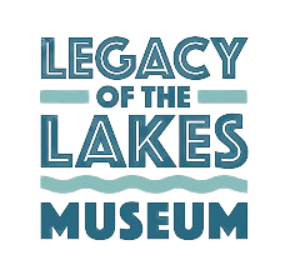

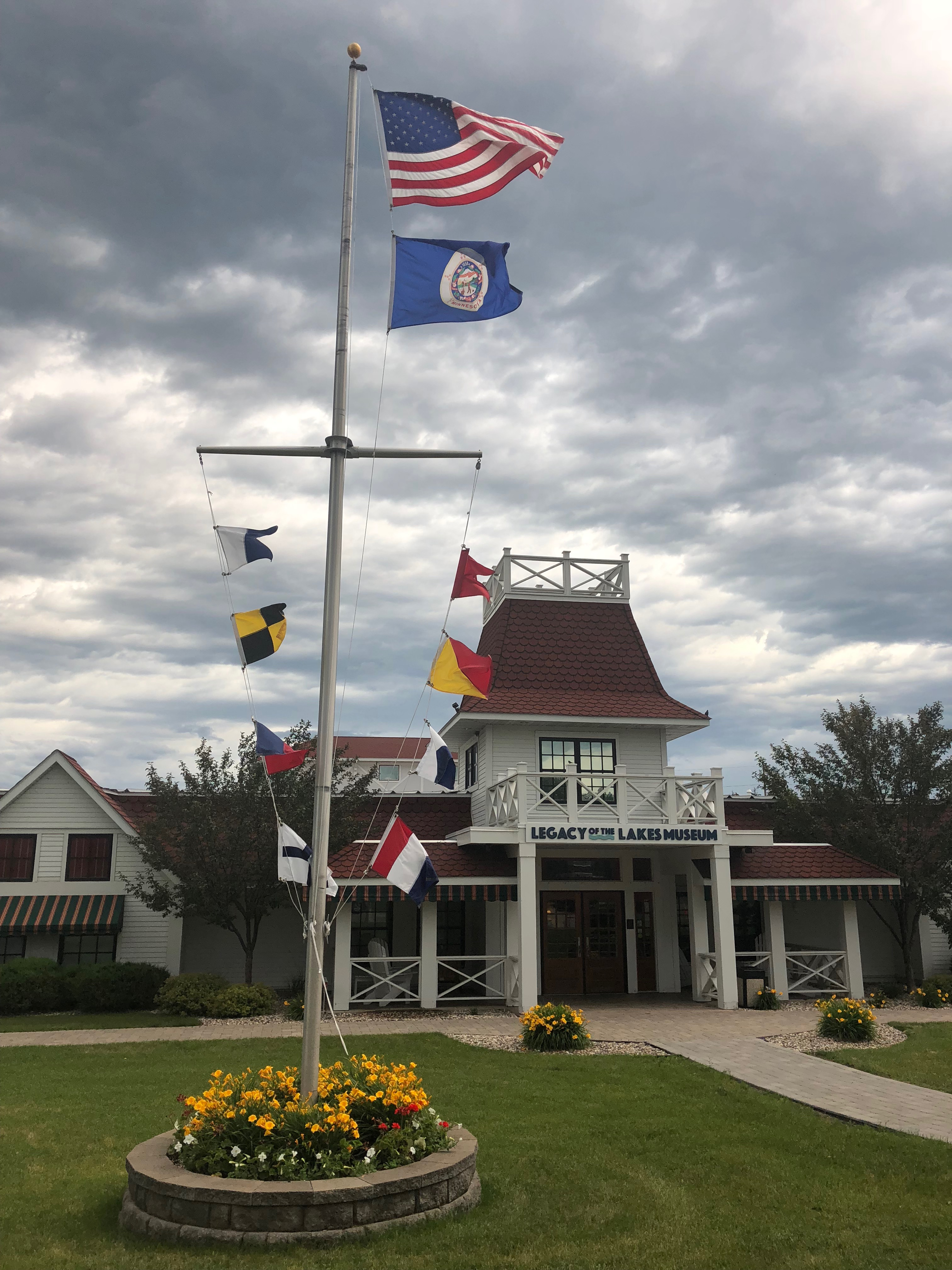
- The museum in 2018

- Location within Minnesota Location within the United States
- Former name: Minnesota Lakes Maritime Museum
- Established: October 4, 2004
- Location: 205 3rd Ave W, Alexandria, MN 56308
- Coordinates: 45.8901°N 95.3793°W
- Type: Maritime museum
- Executive director: Andy Balendy
- President: John Engelen
- Website: legacyofthelakes.org

The Legacy of the Lakes Museum, known as the Minnesota Lakes Maritime Museum until 2016, is a maritime museum in Alexandria, Minnesota. It was opened in 2004 and contains a variety of historic boats and artifacts.

== History ==
The museum was formed in late 1995 and was originally known as the Minnesota Lakes Maritime Museum. However, the museum was not open to the public until October 4, 2004. It relocated to a new location in August 2006. An expansion on the museum's North Gallery broke ground in 2008. The Legacy Gardens' first phase was completed in late 2012, while the second, which added more furnishings, was finished in 2014. The museum changed its name to the Legacy of the Lakes Museum in 2016 to more clearly state its mission, which was to preserve life on Minnesota's lakes. Five rare wooden boats, valued at over US$2 million, were loaned to the museum also in 2016 by Lee Anderson, a private collector. Previously, in 2015, a collector loaned the Heli-Bout, a helicopter and boat hybrid. An indoor event center, the BoatHouse, was constructed in 2018. In 2022, exhibits about shipwrecks in Lake Superior, personal watercraft, and early motorboats.

== Exhibits ==
The museum has rare wooden boats from historic companies such as Chris-Craft Boats and Hacker-Craft. There are also designs by motorboat pioneer Gar Wood. Additionally, it has some Native American-made birch canoes that are centuries old. Other exhibits include ones about hotels, fishing, boat works, and fiberglass. Woodcut prints by Charles Beck are also on display.

The museum holds an annual boat show on Lake Darling showcasing old watercraft. The Legacy Gardens are a botanical garden that is commonly rented for wedding ceremonies.
