= Link Trainer Building =

- U.S. National Register of Historic Places
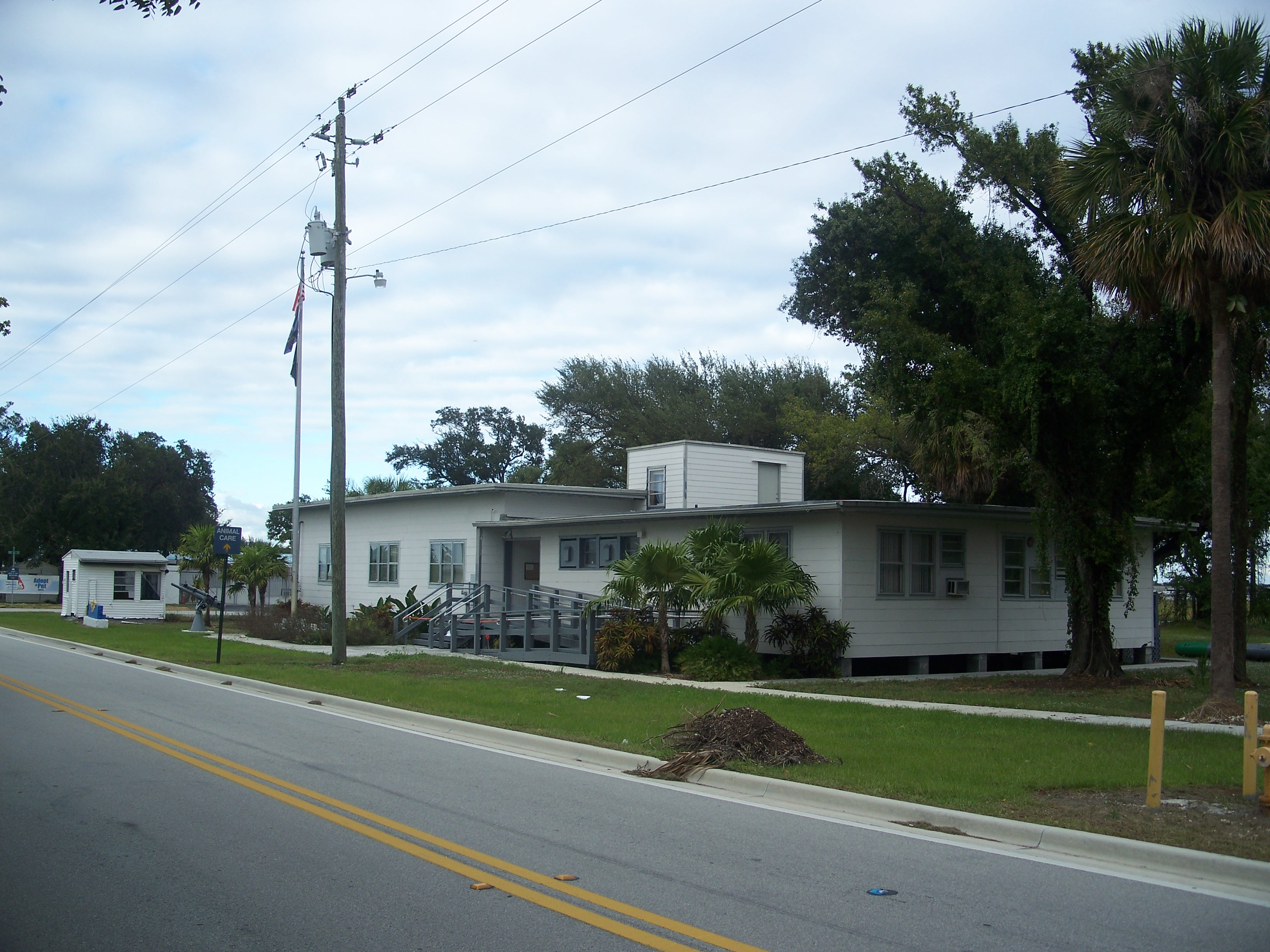

- Location within Florida Location within the United States
- Location: Fort Lauderdale, Florida
- Coordinates: 26°4′16″N 80°9′34″W
- NRHP reference No.: 98000454
- Added to NRHP: 20 May 1998

The Link Trainer Building (also known as the Fort Lauderdale USNAS Building #8 and currently the Naval Air Station Fort Lauderdale Museum) is an historic structure in Fort Lauderdale, Florida. On May 20, 1998, it was added to the U.S. National Register of Historic Places.

The wood frame vernacular building was part of the Naval Air Station Fort Lauderdale (NAS Ft Lauderdale). It was used to train torpedo bomber pilots during World War II using Link Trainer flight simulators. As of 2018 the building serves as the Naval Station Fort Lauderdale Museum.

== Building ==
It was built in 1942. It is a one-story, split-level, wood-frame vernacular building with wood walls and a tar and gravel roof that sat about 30 inches (76 cm) above the ground on a foundation of concrete piers. The exterior is composition siding. The flat roof is built up on top of wood tongue and groove decking supported by wood joists. It is covered with tar and gravel. The 3 foot (0.91 m) roof overhang has a large fascia and a metal drip edge.

It is 114 feet (35 m) long and 41 feet (490 in) feet wide and is composed of two wings. The building has approximately 4,674 square feet (434.2 m^{2}) of floor space. The entrance, between the two wings has a small equipment room above it. This "penthouse" rises above and separates the taller left wing from the right. The front and back have grouped 1/1 light sashes as does the side of the tall wing. The side of the shorter wing has a pair of fixed windows with a center pane and two three pane side lights. The main entrance has double doors with a diamond shaped light in each. The building has three entrances with wood steps. The wood floor is tongue and groove decking on wood joists. In 1998 the original surfaces and materials had been obscured by alterations and the building was disused.

=== Site ===
The building was located at 4050 Southwest 14th Avenue in the former NAS Ft Lauderdale where it had been designated, "Building #8. At the end of 1999, the building, which weighs 300 short tons (270 metric tons), was cut from the old foundation and jacked up hydraulically to be moved out of the airport and to its current location at 4000 West Perimeter Road in Fort Lauderdale, Florida. It remains on the grounds of the Fort Lauderdale–Hollywood International Airport.

== World War II ==
Naval Air Station Fort Lauderdale was established on a civilian airport in 1942 to train torpedo bomber pilots for the Pacific theater in World War II. Training in the Link Trainer Building began on December 28, 1942. The air station made a significant contribution to the war effort with up to 3,600 personnel stationed there. The Link Trainers were early flight simulators used to teach "flying blind" or by instrument only. The student was in a dark compartment with instruments, gauges and controls. A linked map displayed the simulated results using a "bug".

The building housed up to 6 Link Trainers which each student was trained on for four hours. Another four hours of video instruction was provided in Building #8. The aircraft they were training to fly was the Grumman TBF Avenger torpedo bomber. Most airmen trained as NAS Fort Lauderdale were subsequently assigned to squadrons which flew the planes from aircraft carriers in the Pacific. Among them was the then 19 year–old Ensign George H. W. Bush, future United States President.

The air station remained active for some time after the war until in 1948 it was declared surplus by the United States Navy. In stages the air station reverted to civilian control and ownership and Building #8 the Link Trainer Building became the property of Broward County. From a peak of 110 naval buildings during the war the remaining structures dwindled through the years. In 1978 about ten remained, in 1989 there were five. By 1998 the Naval Surface Weapons Center building had been demolished leaving only the Link Trainer Building. The NAS Fort Lauderdale had become the Fort Lauderdale–Hollywood International Airport.

== Modern times ==
Vacant from 1945 to 1955 from then until 1980 it was leased for private offices. From 1981 to 1987 it was used as office space by consults involved in planning the expansion of the Fort Lauderdale–Hollywood International Airport. The Naval Air Station Fort Lauderdale Historical Association was active in fostering interest in the historic building and having it nominated to be added to the National Register of Historic Places.

Founded in 1979 by WW II sailor Allan McElhiney the association first obtained a $10,000 grant from the City of Fort Lauderdale to restore the interior of the building. In 1995 the Broward County Avaiation Department applied for a federal grant to restore and move the building. The grant became contingent on the building being listed as on the National Register of Historic Places. Eventually a $200,000 grant from the United States Department of Transportation funding moving and refurbishing the building.

Since being moved to its current location it has been operated as the Naval Air Station Fort Lauderdale Museum. The museum now has one Link Trainer on display. It was obtained by the museum in 2007 and restored the following year. The museum's displays include "The George Bush Room" a recreated soldier's barracks, "Broward Goes to War" and a memorial to Flight 19 a group Grumann Avengers flying out of NAS Fort Lauderdale whose disappearance is unexplained.

== See also ==
- List of maritime museums in the United States
