= Maritime & Yachting Museum =

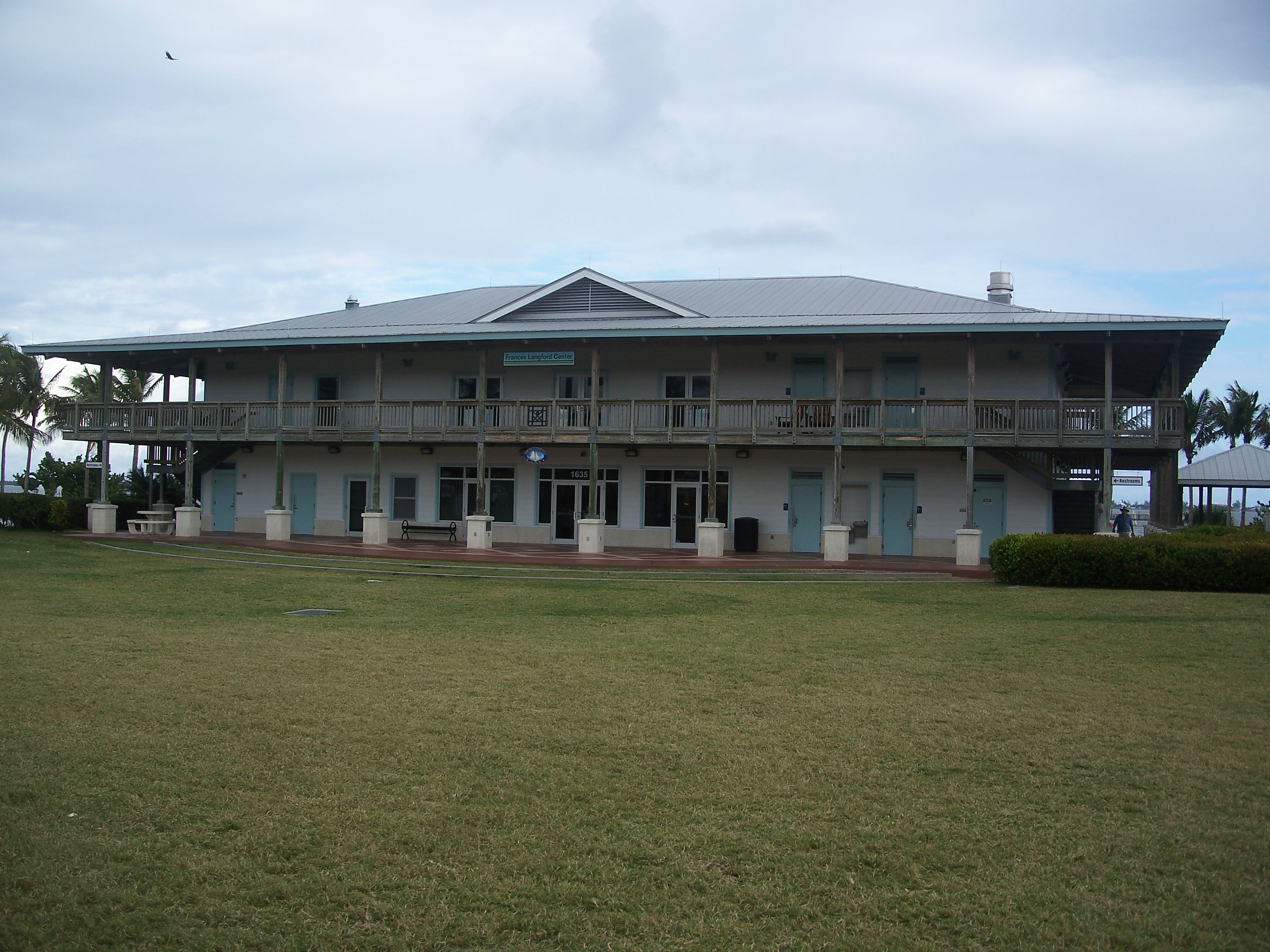

- Location within Florida
- Established: Opened January 1995
- Location: 3250 Southwest Kanner Highway; Stuart, Florida
- Coordinates: 27.065473°N 80.296563°W
- Type: Maritime history
- Director: Nestor Palermo

The Maritime & Yachting Museum is located at 3250 Southwest Kanner Highway, Stuart, Florida, USA. The museum houses many maritime items and artwork, including model ships, antique boats, navigation equipment, paintings and photographs.

== See also ==
- List of maritime museums in the United States
