= Watermen's Museum =

Coordinates: 37°14′21″N 76°30′38″W

The Watermen's Museum is a museum in Yorktown, Virginia. It documents the history of Chesapeake Bay 'watermen', from pre-colonial to modern times.

The Museum is located on Water Street and open to the public from April to December.

== See also ==
- List of maritime museums in the United States
