= Buffalo Maritime Center =

Maritime museum

Buffalo Maritime Center is a maritime museum and a collective woodworking and handcrafts center located in Buffalo, New York, that focuses on boat building and restoration to engage the community. It encompasses a museum displaying historic ships and displays about the history of shipping on the Great Lakes and New York state canals, a boat-building program that produces replicas of historic wooden boats, and a foundry producing brass fittings for historic ships and replica ships.

== History ==
The Center was started by Dr. John Montague, a professor in Buffalo State College's Design Department in 1989.

In 2007 Montague retired from the University, turned the popular boat-building classes into a not-for-profit corporation called the Buffalo Maritime Center, and moved it to a downtown location. Over the years it expanded to encompass a foundry producing historical nautical hardware, a research library, and a museum with a growing collection of historic boats, ship models, paintings and artifacts related to the maritime history of the region's Great Lakes and canals. During the last decade it has been housed in various former factory sites in the City of Buffalo. Its newest location, in addition to its Arthur Street location in Buffalo, is part of the Buffalo and Erie County Naval & Military Park, in a new longshed that being developed on the Buffalo waterfront.

== Projects ==
The volunteer-staffed historic wooden boat building program has produced replica canal boats that are in use at the Flight of Five Locks, in Lockport, New York.

In 2019 the Center received funding from the Erie Canal Harbor Development Corp. (ECHDC), a subsidiary of Empire State Development Corporation, to build a replica of the packet boat in which Governor Dewitt Clinton rode when he opened the Erie Canal in 1825. The State of New York committed $4 million construct a new 4,000-square-foot, year-round facility for the Maritime Center in which the historically accurate, 73-foot-long, 10-foot wide historic wooden canal boat will be built by hand by the Centre's volunteers boatbuilders. This new building and boat will closely correspond to the opening of the Erie Canal in 1825 marking the 200th anniversary of the “Big Ditch”.

The Center has built a historically accurate mold used by museum members to build their own historically accurate wood-frame canoes.

== See also ==
- List of maritime museums in the United States
