= Maritime Museum, Tranquebar =

Maritime Museum in Tranquebar, Mayiladuthurai district

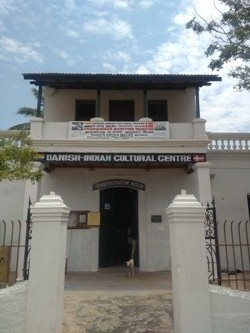
- Location: Tharangambadi

Maritime Museum, Tranquebar is a maritime museum located at Tharangambadi in the Mayiladuthurai district of the Indian state of Tamil Nadu on the Coromandel Coast.

== Location ==
It is situated opposite to Danish Fort.

== Displayed objects ==
In this teensy ramshackle museum, a mishmash of old boats, fishing memorabilia and a hard-hitting photo-video of the effects of the 2004 tsunami in Tranquebar are found. The Tharangambadi maritime museum has displays of preserved sea life, shells, models of boat, utensils, costumes, paintings and little more that were used by the Danes. They also have a small Indian stamp collection. The Danish Commander’s House is an airy 18th-century bungalow. It was restored by the Danish Tranquebar Association. It now houses the Tranquebar Maritime Museum. In it stories of the sea are found. An old wooden ship occupies an important place. It is surrounded by an odd collection of ships parts, old trunks, and the skeletal remains of marine creatures, and bits and bobs collected from Danish ships. Glass objects, Chinese tea jars, swords, daggers, spears etc., are found. Many of these objects are from the sea. Kattumarams, Horse teeth, sea conch are also found here.

== Objects in Fort Museum ==
The 17th and 18th century antiquities and relics from the Vijayanagara Empire and Thanjavur Nayak kingdom, which authorized, allowed, and sanctioned the aforementioned Danish port township connected with the colonial period and Danish settlement at Tharangampadi are exhibited. The museum contains porcelain ware, Danish manuscripts, glass objects, Chinese tea jars, steatitle lamps, decorated terracotta objects, figurines, lamps, stones, sculptures, swords, daggers, spears, sudai (stucco) figurines and wooden objects. There is also part of a whale skeleton, a giant sawfish rostrum and small cannonballs.

== Visiting hours ==
Visitors are allowed to this museum from 9.30 a.m. to 1.30 p.m. and 2.30 p.m. to 6.00 p.m.

== Gallery ==
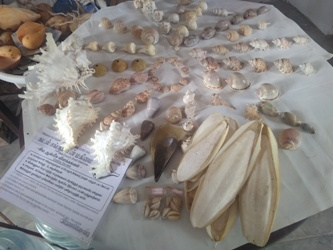

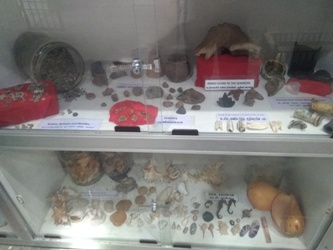

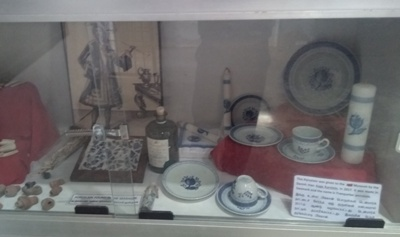

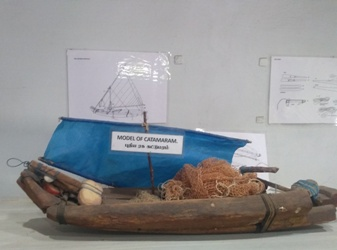

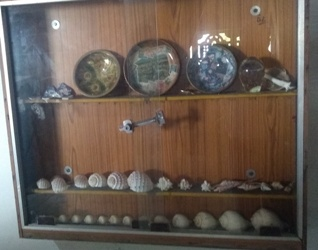

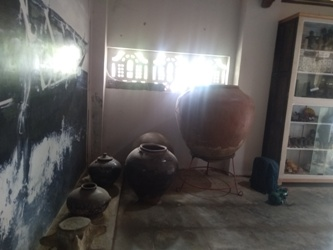

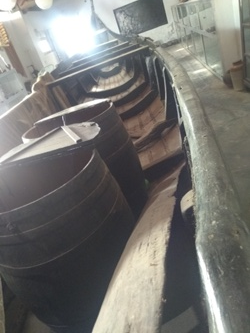

== See also ==
- Danish India
- Puhar
- Kulasekharapatnam
- European colonies in India
- Danish East India Company
- History of Denmark
- Bartholomäus Ziegenbalg
- Tiruchirappalli Fort
