= Council of American Maritime Museums =

Organization

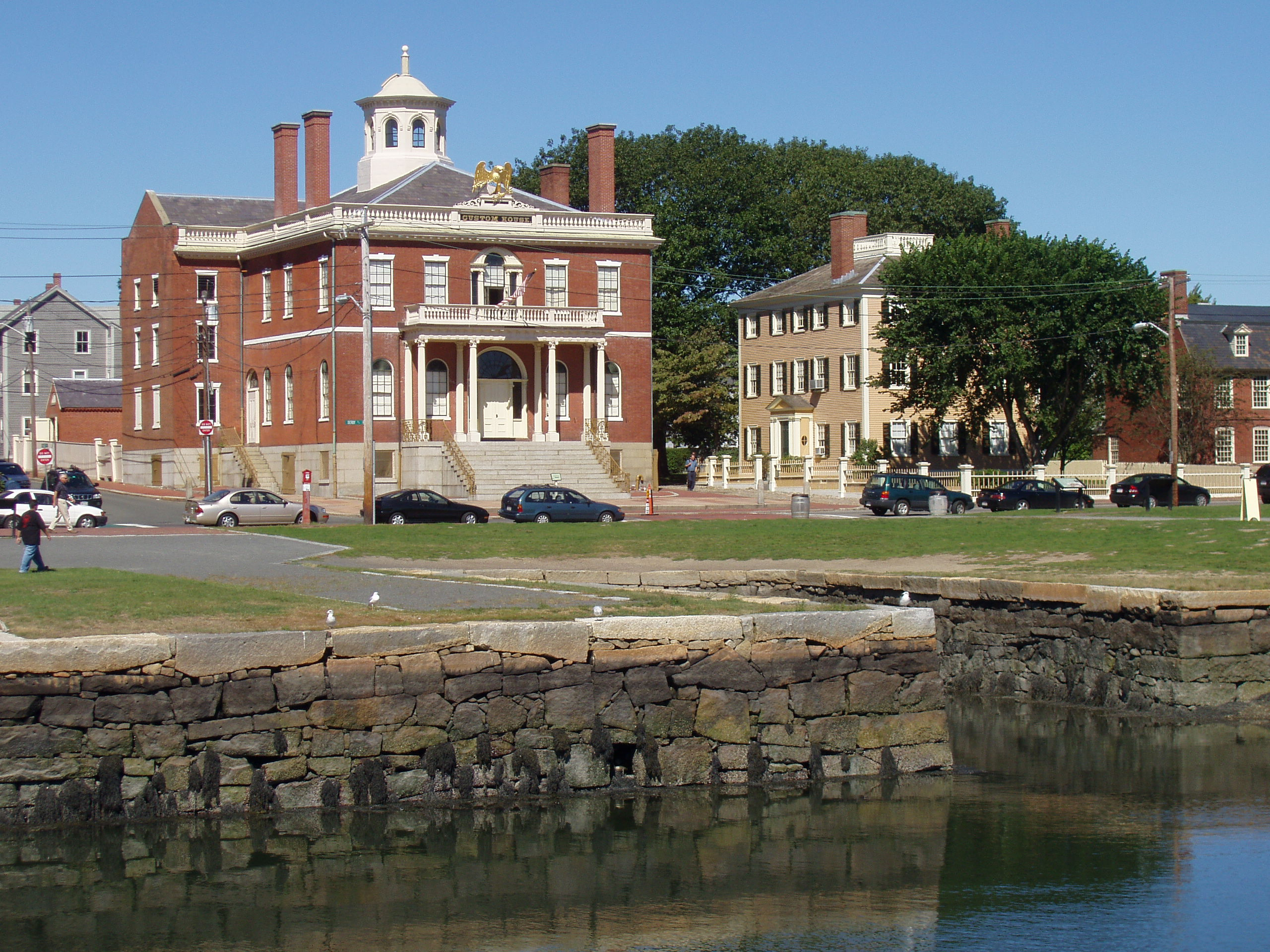
Customs House at the Salem Maritime National Historic Site in Salem, Massachusetts - The Salem Maritime National Historic Site consists of 12 historic structures and about 9 acres (36,000 m^{2}) of land along the waterfront in Salem Harbor in Salem, Massachusetts, plus a Visitor Center in downtown Salem. It was the first American National Historic Site, and interprets the triangular trade during the colonial period; privateers during the American Revolution; and sea trade, especially with the Far East, after independence.

The Council of American Maritime Museums (CAMM) was established in 1974 to be a forum for professionals working in North American maritime museums.

== Overview ==
It has a membership of 80+ museums, as well as scholars and professionals in the United States, Canada, Mexico, Bermuda, and Australia.

According to a 1990 article in the journal Archaeology, the council's ethical standards "prohibit the display of artifacts from commercially exploited sites."
