= North American Reciprocal Museum Association =

The North American Reciprocal Museum (NARM) program is an affiliation of arts, historical, and cultural institutions in the United States, Canada, Mexico, Bermuda, and the Cayman Islands, which offer reciprocal benefits to qualifying members of other participating NARM institutions. As of March 2026, NARM has 1,541 participating institutions.

Institutions in the association offer a range of membership benefits to qualified members of participating museums, that typically includes free admission and/or museum shop discounts. Individuals interested in getting these benefits should check with their local museum to see if they participate in the NARM program, and the levels of membership required to qualify.

Museums and other institutions may join NARM if they meet certain requirements for reciprocal offerings to visiting members of other NARM institutions. Institutional membership is not exclusive, in that an organization may also join other similar associations, such as the Museum Alliance Reciprocal Program (MARP), Time Travelers Reciprocal Membership Program, Reciprocal Organization of Associated Museums (ROAM), or Art Museum Reciprocal Network (AMRN). There are also regional alliances such as the Southeastern Reciprocal Membership Program (SERM), Western Museum Reciprocal Program, or Empire State Museums Reciprocal Program. A given institution may choose to participate in none of these associations, or in any combination of them. For example, as of 2021, the Birmingham Museum of Art offers reciprocal benefits through international and regional programs.

Art museums associated with colleges or universities have organized a College and University Art Museums Reciprocal Program (CUAMRP, previously called the Academic Art Museum Reciprocal Membership program).

A participating museum may receive benefits that can outweigh a potential reduction in direct admissions fees. Access to reciprocal membership privileges is usually reserved for membership levels higher than a basic membership, and participating museums have found that membership revenues may increase after announcement of a reciprocal program. More visitors can be attracted from out of town, and often they spend money on parking, food, and museum shop purchases far in excess of any waived admission fees. Reciprocal programs may also offer training, conferences, and professional development for museum staff.

The NARM website highlights selected member institutions and their offerings, with a focus on special exhibitions. NARM also publishes a quarterly magazine which announces new institutional members, features selected programs including online or virtual offerings, and describes any changes to the association.

== See also ==
- Association of Science and Technology Centers – offers a similar ASTC Travel Passport program of reciprocal benefits for members of science and technology museums
