= Maritime museum =

Type of museum related to ships

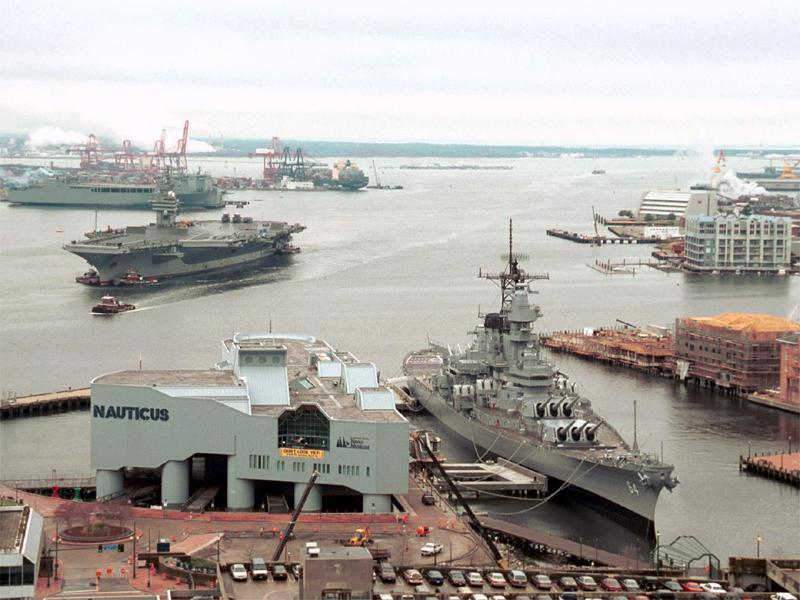
USS Wisconsin is one of four Iowa class battleships opened to the public as a museum (berthed at Nauticus in Norfolk, VA)

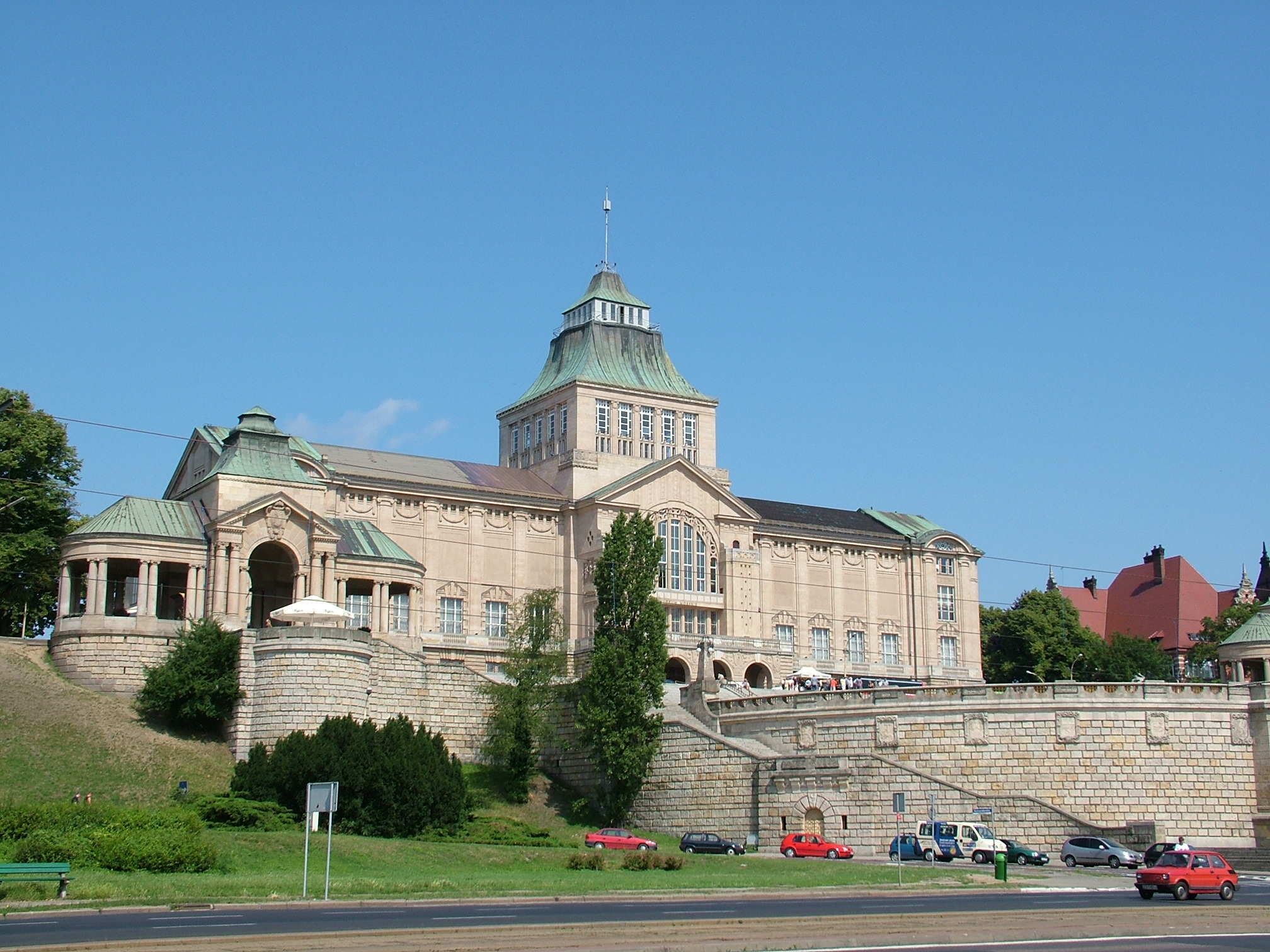
Maritime Museum in Szczecin, Poland

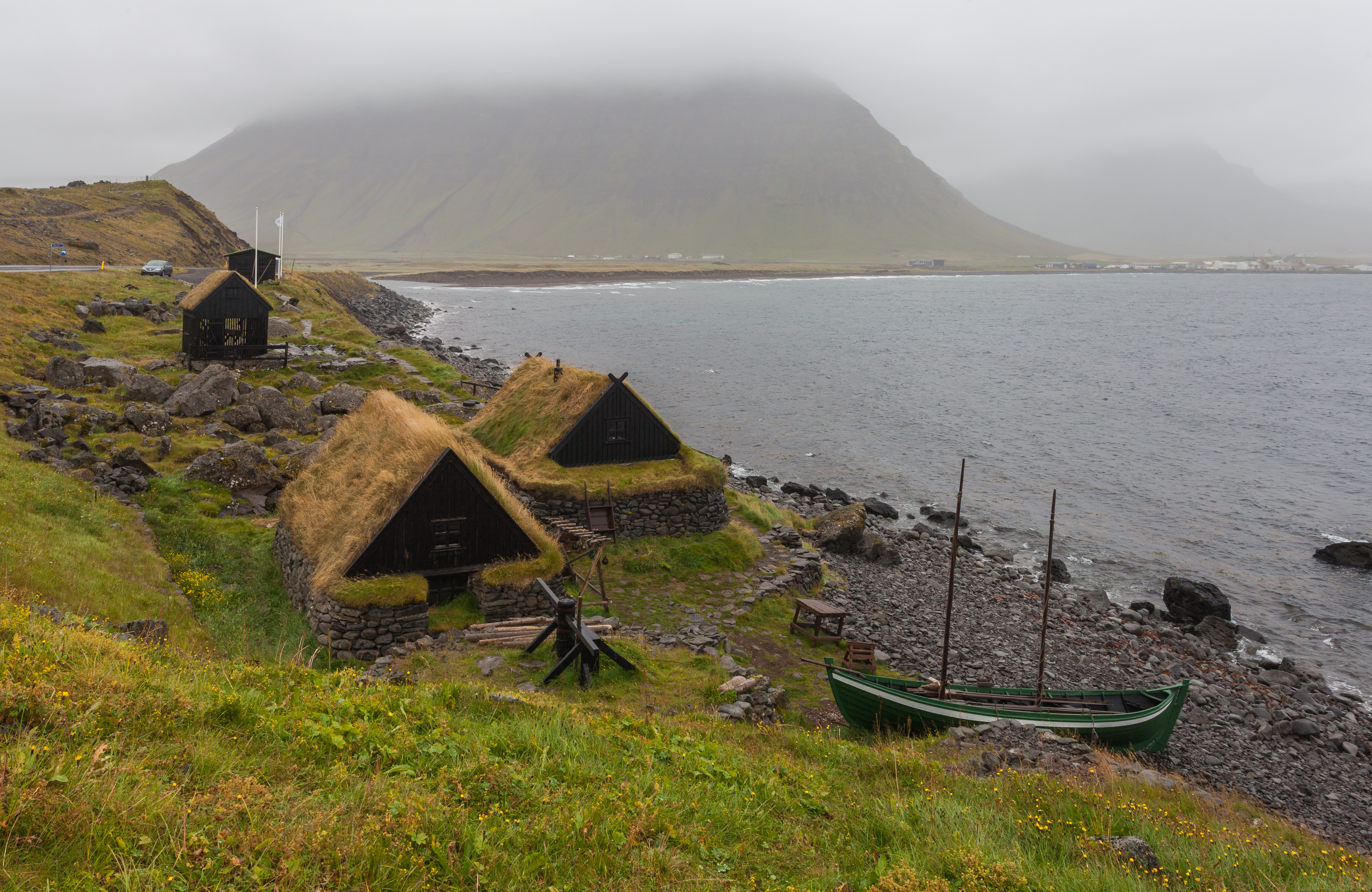
A maritime museum located in the village of Bolungarvík, Vestfirðir, Iceland showing a double 19th century fishing base, a salt hut, a fish drying area, a drying hut and a typical fishing boat of the time.

A maritime museum (sometimes nautical museum) is a museum specializing in the display of objects relating to ships and travel on large bodies of water. A subcategory of maritime museums are naval museums, which focus on navies and the military use of the sea.

The great prize of a maritime museum is a historic ship (or a replica) made accessible as a museum ship, but as these are large and require a considerable budget to maintain, many museums preserve smaller or more fragile ships or partial ships within the museum buildings. Most museums exhibit interesting pieces of ships (such as a figurehead or cannon), ship models, and miscellaneous small items associated with ships and shipping, like cutlery, uniforms, and so forth.

Ship modellers often have a close association with maritime museums; not only does the museum have items that help the modeller achieve better accuracy, but the museum provides a display space for models larger than will comfortably fit in a modeller's home, and of the museum is happy to take a ship model as a donation. Museums will also commission models.

There are thousands of maritime museums in the world. Many belong to the International Congress of Maritime Museums, which coordinates members' efforts to acquire, preserve, and display their material. There is a risk that too many maritime museums might dilute the experience for the public, while a poorly managed museum might put other municipalities off from the idea of hosting such a museum.

At 80 acres (32 ha) the Chatham Historic Dockyard in Kent, UK can lay claim to being the largest maritime museum in the world, incorporating numerous dockyard buildings, including a 1/4 mile long ropewalk, spinning rooms, covered slips, dry docks, smithery, sail loft, rigging house, mould loft, church, as well as three historic warships, it is the best preserved dockyard from the Age of Sail. However, the UK's National Maritime Museum in Greenwich is also a contender, with many items of great historical significance, such as the actual uniform worn by Horatio Nelson at the Battle of Trafalgar. The largest in the United States of America is 19 acres (7.7 ha), Mystic Seaport in Mystic, Connecticut; it preserves not only a number of sailing ships, but also many original seaport buildings, including a ship chandlery, sail loft, ropewalk, and so forth.

A recent activity of maritime museums is to build replicas of ships, since there are few survivors that have not already been restored and put on display. Another is operating a museum harbour, most notably in Germany and the Netherlands but elsewhere too, that offers mooring to privately owned historical vessels, which can be watched but not boarded.

== Preservation of ships ==
The preservation of ships in museums ensures that ancient and historic vessels are preserved for posterity in optimum conditions and are available for academic study and for public education and interest.

Remains of ancient and historic ships and boats can be seen in museums around the world. Where a ship is in a good state of preservation it can sometimes act as a museum in its own right. Many museum ships, such as HMS Victory are popular tourist attractions. Some ships are too fragile to be exposed outdoors or are incomplete and must be preserved indoors. The remains of the Mary Rose for example are kept in a purpose designed building so that conservation treatment can be applied.

In some cases, archaeologists have discovered traces of ships and boats where there are no extant physical remains to be preserved, such as Sutton Hoo, where museum displays can show what the vessel would have looked like, although the vessel itself no longer exists.

== Notable maritime museums ==
=== Africa ===
- Admiral Nevelskoi Maritime Museum, Admiral Nevelskoi Yacht, Mauritius
- Alexandria Maritime Museum, Alexandria, Egypt
- Musée de la Mer, Gorée, Senegal
- Oceanographic Museum of Salammbô, Carthage, Tunisia
- South African Naval Museum, Simon's Town, South Africa

=== Asia ===
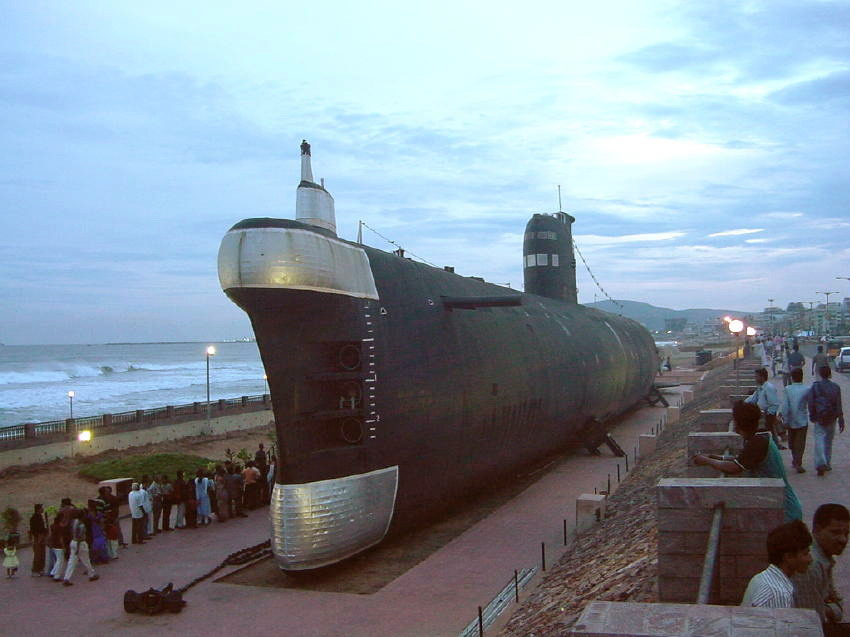
Kursura as a museum ship in Visakhapatnam.

- Museo del Galeón, Pasay, Philippines
- Brunei Darussalam Maritime Museum, Kota Batu, Brunei
- Evergreen Maritime Museum, Taipei, Taiwan
- Hoods Tower Naval Museum, Trincomalee, Sri Lanka
- Hong Kong Maritime Museum, Central, Hong Kong, China
- Kure maritime Museum, Kure, Japan
- Kursura Submarine Museum, Visakhapatnam, India
- Kobe Maritime Museum, Kobe, Japan
- Maritime Museum, Macau, China
- Maritime Museum, Malacca, Malaysia
- Labuan Maritime Museum, Victoria, Malaysia
- Maritime Museum, Tranquebar, India
- Maritime Museum of Indonesia, Jakarta, Indonesia
- Maritime Museum of Kuwait, Kuwait City, Kuwait
- Museum of Maritime Science, Tokyo, Japan
- National Maritime Museum, Busan, South Korea
- National Maritime Museum, Galle, Sri Lanka
- Naval Aviation Museum, Vasco da Gama, India
- Pakistan Maritime Museum, Karachi, Pakistan
- Quanzhou Maritime Museum, Quanzhou, Fujian, China
- Sea Culture Museum, Okinawa, Japan
- Singapore Navy Museum, Singapore
- Tamkang University Maritime Museum, New Taipei, Taiwan
- Visakha Naval Maritime Museum, Visakhapatnam, India
- YM Museum of Marine Exploration Kaohsiung, Kaohsiung, Taiwan
- Lothal Maritime Museum, Lothal, India

=== Oceania ===
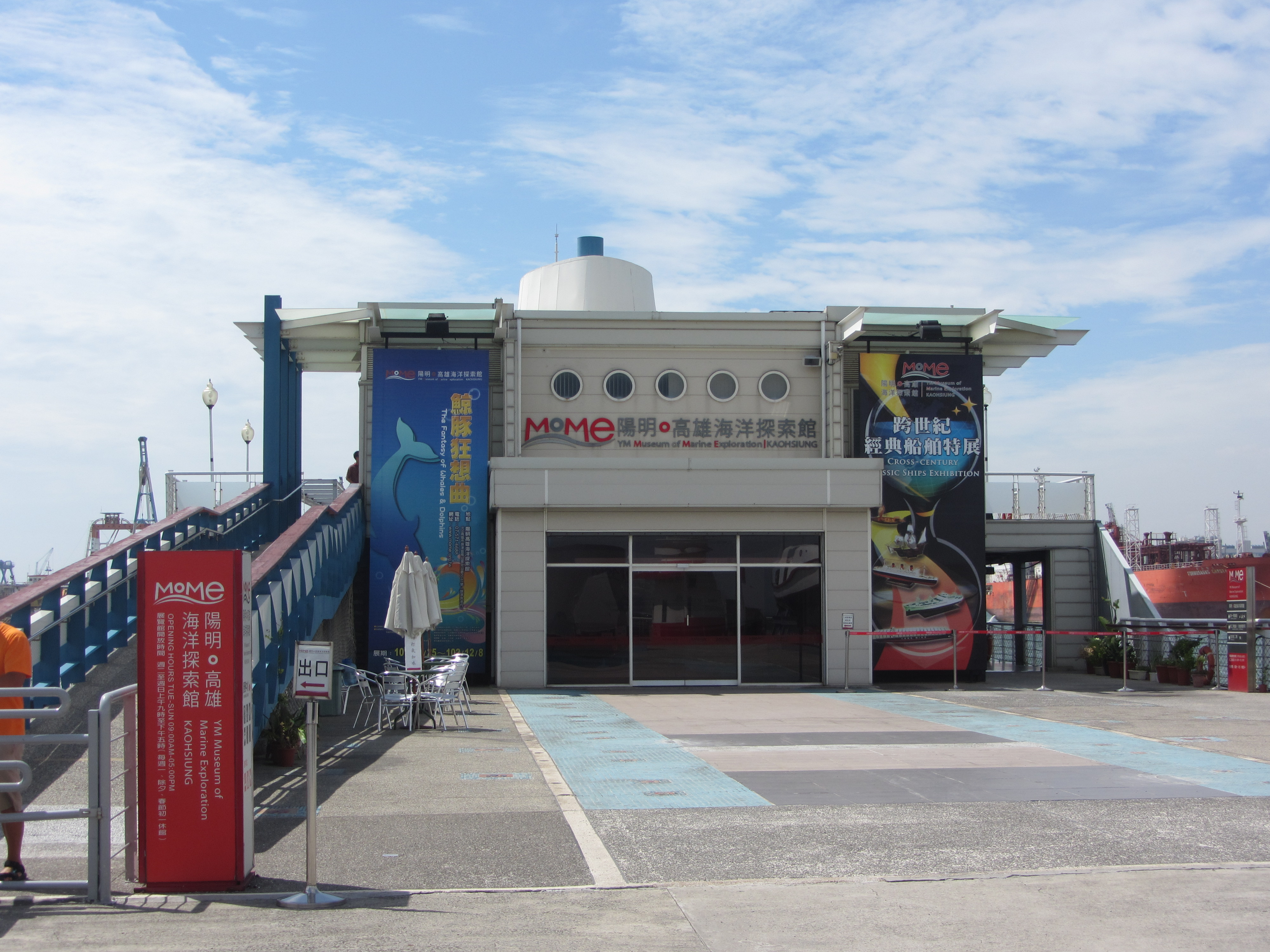
YM Museum of Marine Exploration Kaohsiung in Kaohsiung, Taiwan.

- Australian National Maritime Museum, Sydney, Australia
- Maritime Museum of New Caledonia, Nouméa, New Caledonia
- Maritime Museum of Tasmania, Hobart, Australia
- National Maritime Museum, Auckland, New Zealand
- Queensland Maritime Museum, Brisbane, Australia
- Sydney Heritage Fleet, Sydney, Australia
- Torpedo Bay Navy Museum, Auckland, New Zealand
- WA Maritime Museum, Fremantle, Australia

=== Europe ===
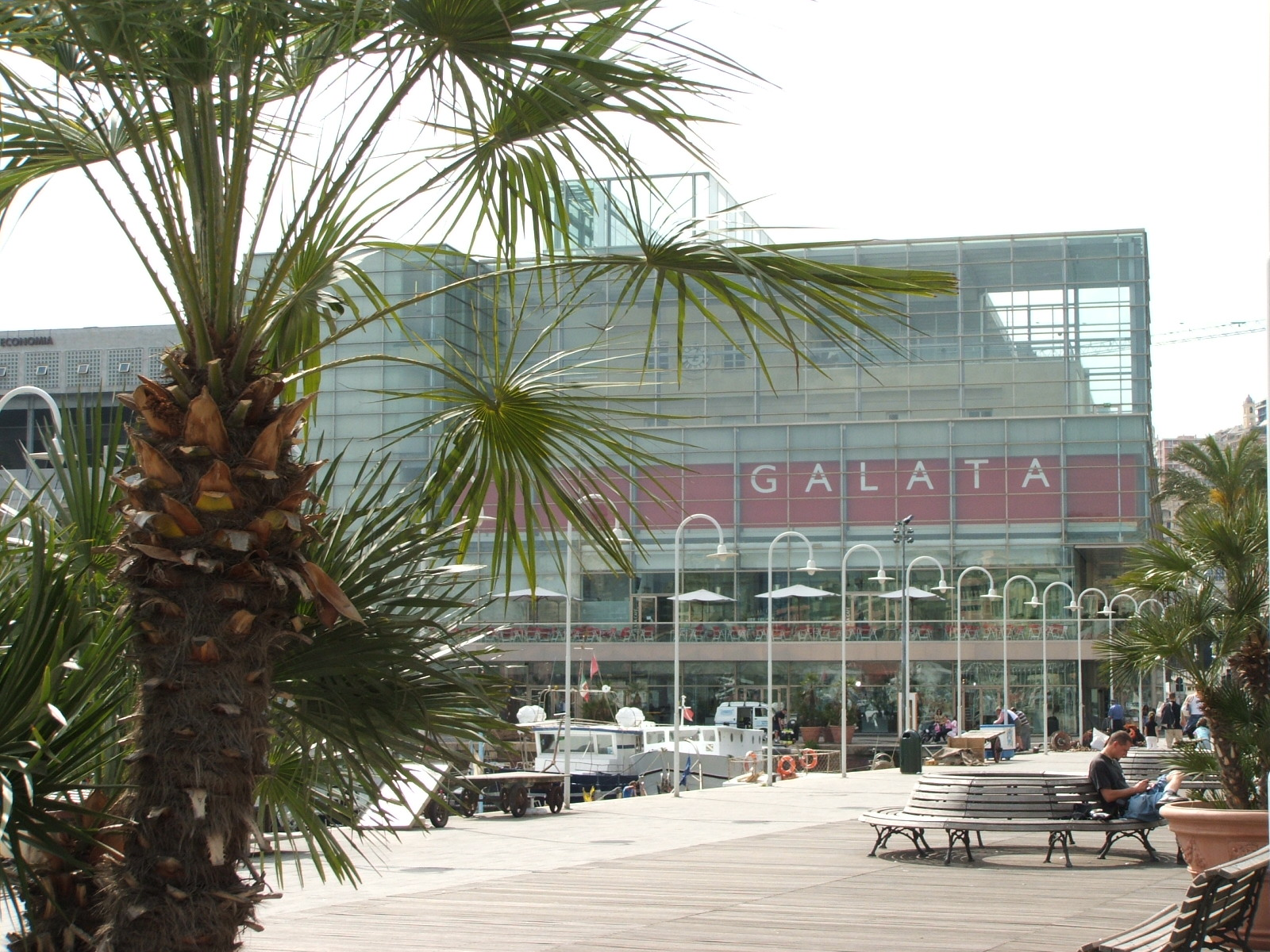
Galata Museo del Mare, Genoa, the largest Maritime Museum of the Mediterranean

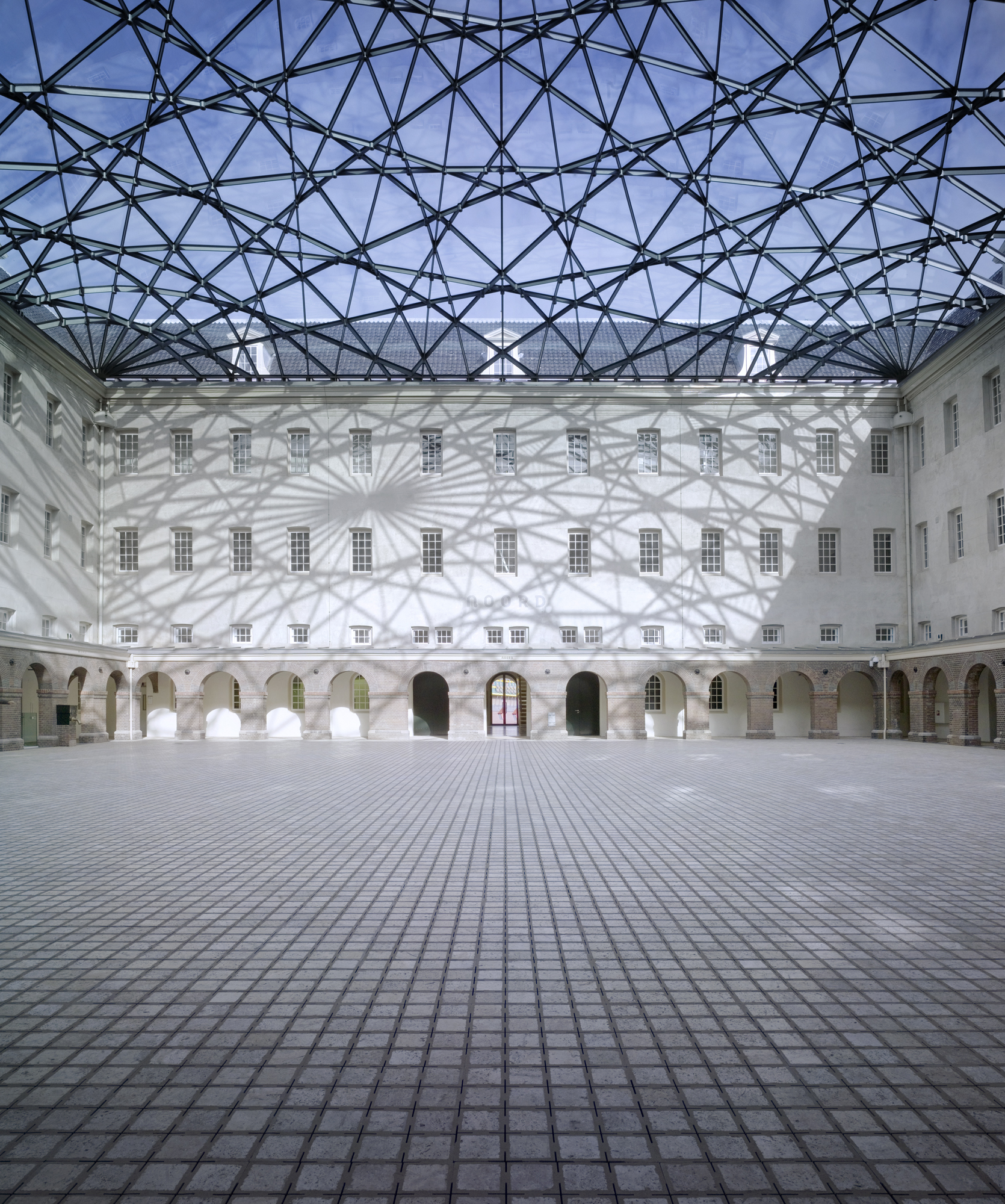
Courtyard of the National Maritime Museum in Amsterdam, Netherlands

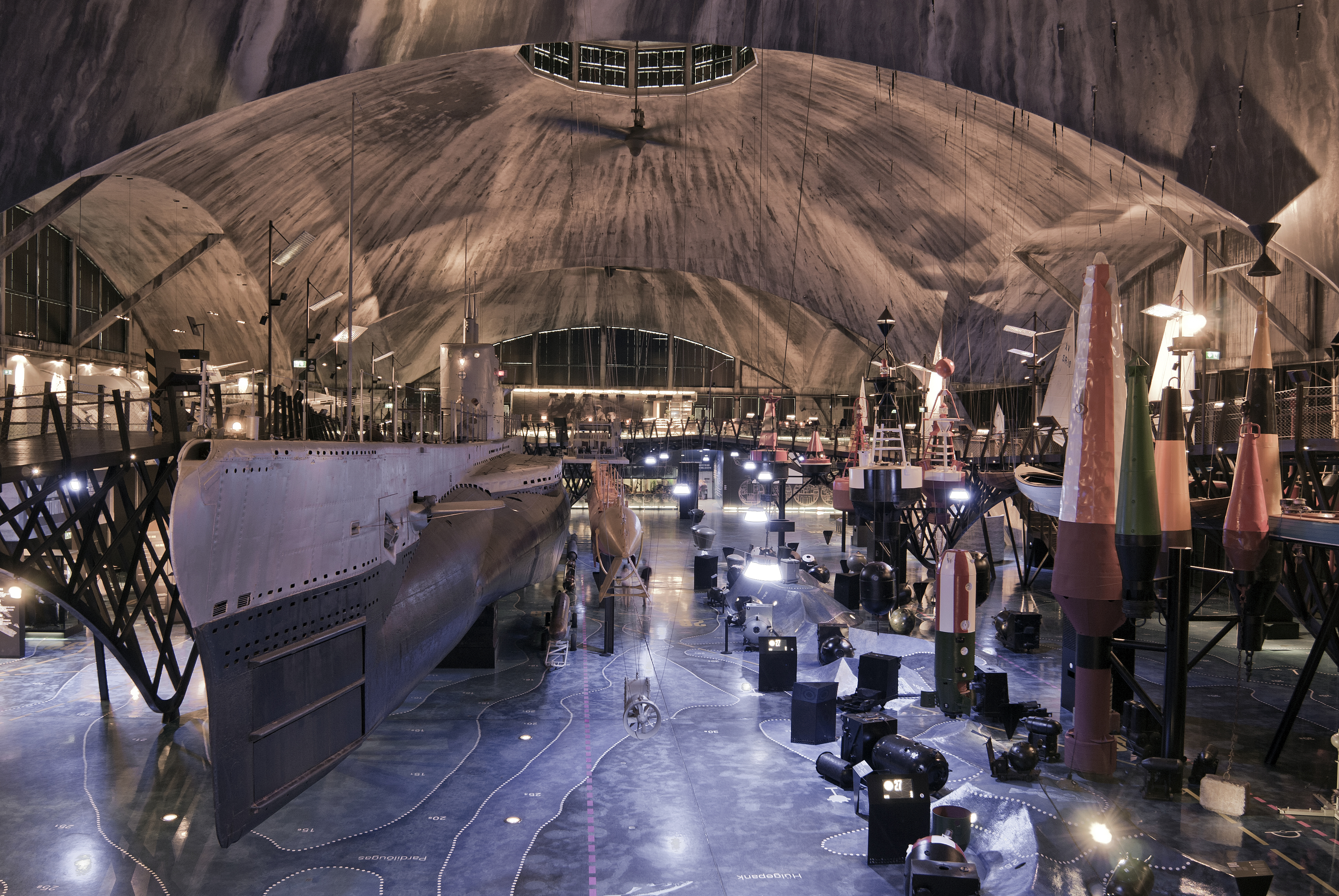
Submarine Lembit in Estonian Maritime Museum

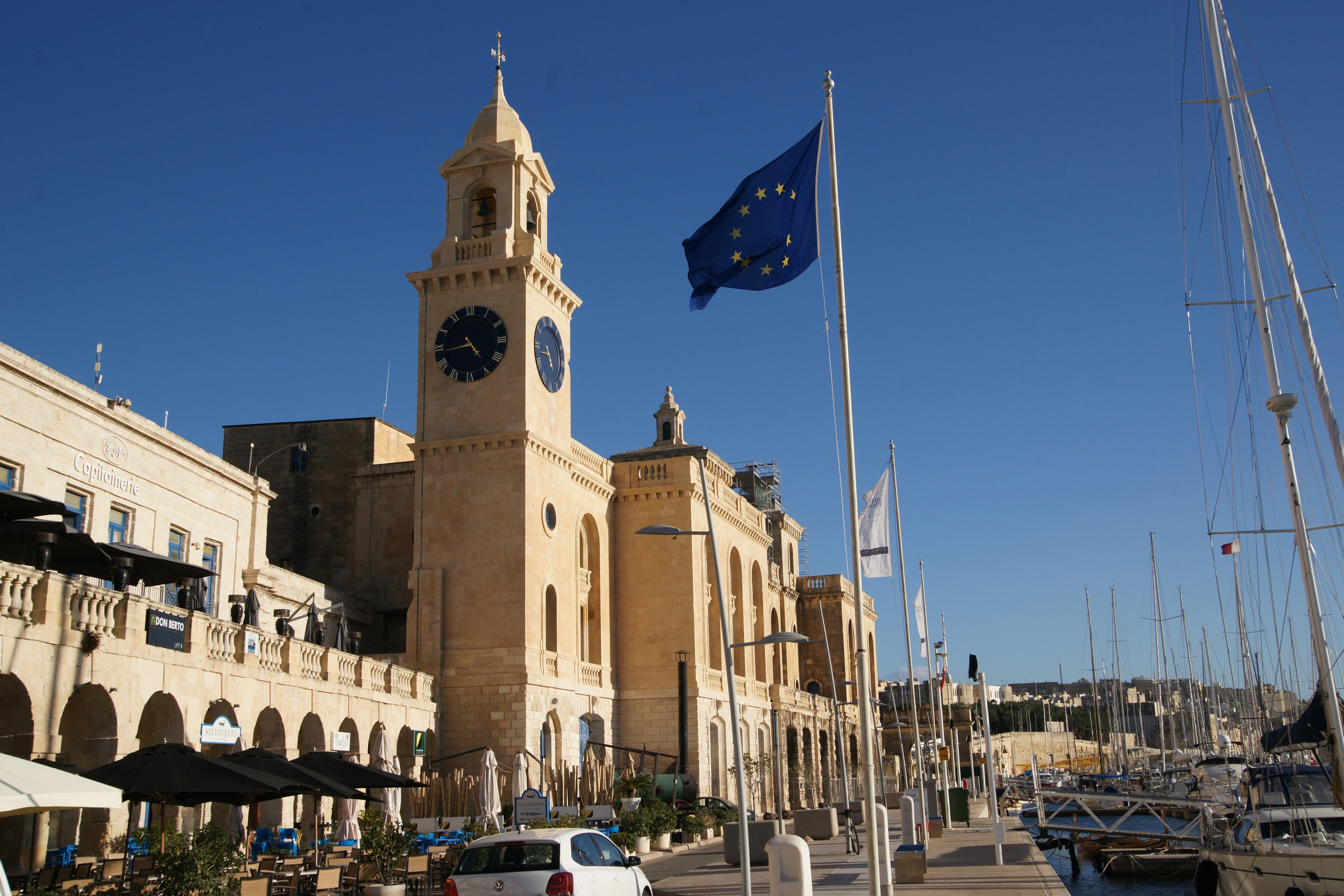
Malta Maritime Museum in Birgu, Malta

- Aalborg Søfarts- og Marinemuseum, Aalborg, Denmark
- Aberdeen Maritime Museum, Aberdeen, Scotland, United Kingdom
- Central Naval Museum, Saint-Petersburg, Russia
- Chatham Historic Dockyard, Chatham, Kent, England, United Kingdom
- Cité de la Mer, Cherbourg-Octeville, France
- Danish Maritime Museum, Kronborg Castle, Helsingør, Denmark
- Dutch Navy Museum, Den Helder, Netherlands
- Estonian Maritime Museum, Tallinn, Estonia
- Fisheries and Maritime Museum, Esbjerg, Denmark
- Forum Marinum, Turku, Finland
- Fries Scheepvaart Museum, Sneek, Netherlands
- Galata Museo del Mare, Genoa, Italy
- German Maritime Museum, Bremerhaven, Germany
- German Naval Museum, Wilhelmshaven, Germany
- Het Scheepvaartmuseum, Amsterdam, Netherlands
- Hull Maritime Museum, Kingston upon Hull, England, United Kingdom
- Internationales Maritimes Museum, Hamburg, Germany
- Istanbul Naval Museum, Istanbul, Turkey
- Jersey Maritime Museum, Saint Helier, Jersey
- The Frigate Jylland, Ebeltoft, Denmark
- Kiel Maritime Museum, Kiel, Germany
- Lancaster Maritime Museum, Lancaster, England, United Kingdom
- Lowestoft Maritime Museum, Suffolk, England, United Kingdom
- Malta Maritime Museum, Birgu, Malta
- Marinemuseet, Karljohansvern, Horten, Norway
- Marinmuseum, Karlskrona, Sweden
- Maritime Center Vellamo, Kotka, Finland
- Maritime Museum, Stockholm, Sweden
- Maritiman, Gothenburg, Sweden
- Maritime Museum of Barcelona, Barcelona, Spain
- Maritime Museum Ria de Bilbao, Bilbao, Spain
- Maritime Museum Rotterdam, Rotterdam, the Netherlands
- Merseyside Maritime Museum, Liverpool, England, United Kingdom
- Musée national de la Marine, Paris, France
- Musée national de la Marine in Brest, Brest, France
- Musée national de la Marine in Port-Louis, Port-Louis, France
- Musée national de la Marine in Rochefort, Rochefort, France
- Musée national de la Marine in Toulon, Toulon, France
- Musée Mer Marine Bordeaux, Bordeaux, France
- Museo Naval de Madrid, Madrid, Spain
- Museo Storico Navale, Venice, Italy
- Technical Naval Museum, La Spezia, Italy
- Museu de Marinha, Lisbon, Portugal
- Museum of Military History of the Black Sea Fleet, Sevastopol, Ukraine
- Museum of the World Ocean, Kaliningrad, Russia
- Museum of the Sea, Cascais, Portugal
- National Maritime Museum, Amsterdam, Netherlands
- National Maritime Museum Cornwall, England, United Kingdom
- National Maritime Museum, Gdańsk, Poland
- National Maritime Museum, Greenwich, England, United Kingdom
- National Maritime Museum of Ireland, Dún Laoghaire, Ireland
- National Maritime Museum, Szczecin, Poland
- Naval Museum of the Northern Fleet, Murmansk, Russia
- Northern Maritime Museum, Arkhangelsk, Russia
- Oceanographic Museum of Monaco
- Passage West Maritime Museum, Cork, Ireland
- Rauma Maritime Museum, Rauma, Finland
- Royal Danish Naval Museum, Copenhagen, Denmark
- Riverside Museum, Glasgow, Scotland, United Kingdom
- Schifffahrtsmuseum Flensburg, Flensburg, Germany
- Scottish Maritime Museum, Irvine and Dumbarton, Scotland, United Kingdom
- Southampton Maritime Museum, Southampton, England, United Kingdom
- Vasa Museum, Stockholm, Sweden
- Vikin Maritime Museum, Reykjavík, Iceland
- Westfjords Heritage Museum, Ísafjörður, Iceland

=== North America ===
The Council of American Maritime Museums serves as network for museum professionals in North America.

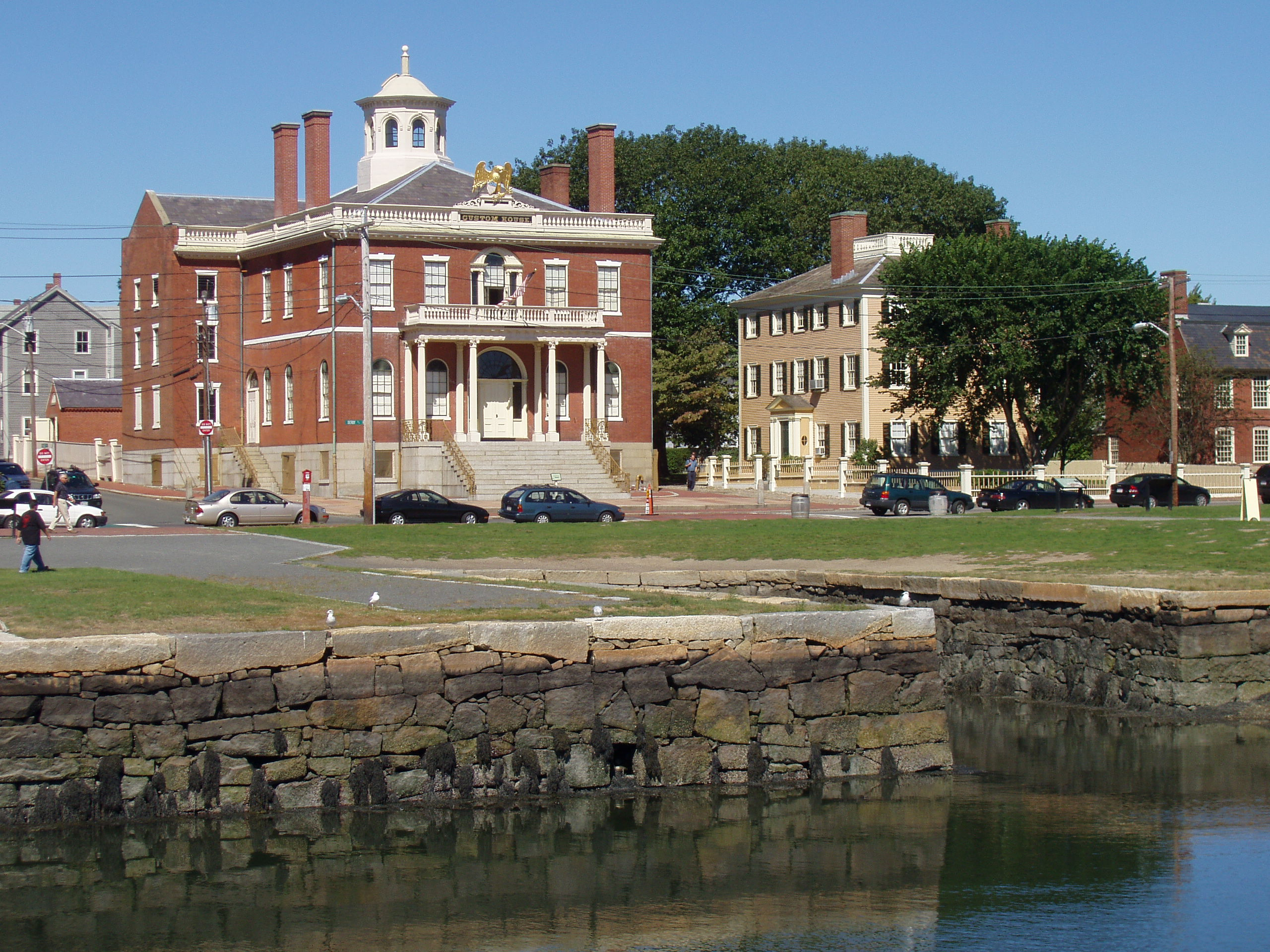
Customs House at the Salem Maritime National Historic Site in Salem, Massachusetts.

- Battleship USS Iowa Museum, Los Angeles, California, US
- Bermuda Maritime Museum, Sandys Parish, Bermuda
- Buffalo and Erie County Naval & Military Park, Buffalo, New York, US
- Calvert Marine Museum, Solomons, Maryland, US
- Camden Shipyard & Maritime Museum, Camden, New Jersey, US
- Columbia River Maritime Museum, Astoria, Oregon, US
- Coral World Ocean Park, St. Thomas, U.S. Virgin Islands
- Dossin Great Lakes Museum, Detroit, Michigan, US
- Florida Maritime Museum, Cortez, Florida, US
- Great Lakes Floating Maritime Museum, Duluth, Minnesota, US
- H. Lee White Marine Museum, Oswego, New York, US
- Hampton Roads Naval Museum, Norfolk, Virginia, US
- Herreshoff Marine Museum, Bristol, Rhode Island, US
- Historic Ships in Baltimore, Baltimore, Maryland, US
- Independence Seaport Museum, Philadelphia, Pennsylvania, US
- Intrepid Sea, Air & Space Museum, New York City, US
- Lake Champlain Maritime Museum, Basin Harbor, Vermont, US
- Long Island Maritime Museum, Long Island, New York, US
- Los Angeles Maritime Museum, Los Angeles, California, US
- Maine Maritime Museum, Bath, Maine, US
- Mariners' Museum, Newport News, Virginia, US – National Maritime Museum
- Maritime Heritage Centre, Campbell River, British Columbia, Canada
- Maritime Museum, Belize City, Belize

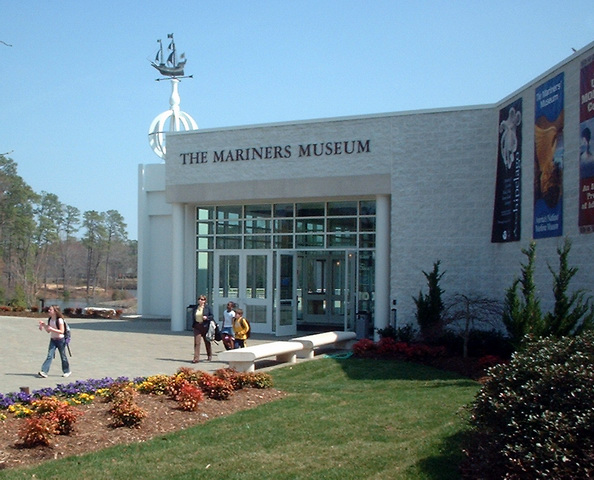
The Mariners' Museum in Newport News, Virginia

- Maritime & Seafood Industry Museum, Biloxi, Mississippi, US
- Maritime Museum of British Columbia, Victoria, British Columbia, Canada
- Maritime Museum of San Diego, San Diego, California, US
- Maritime Museum of the Atlantic, Halifax, Nova Scotia, Canada
- Maritime Museum, San Francisco Maritime National Historical Park, California, US
- Museo Naval México, Veracruz, Mexico
- Mystic Seaport, Mystic, Connecticut, US
- National Museum of Naval Aviation, Pensacola, Florida, US
- National Museum of the United States Navy, Washington, D.C., US
- Nauticus, Norfolk, Virginia, US
- Naval Undersea Museum, Keyport, Washington, US
- Naval War College Museum, Newport, Rhode Island, US
- New Bedford Whaling Museum, New Bedford, Massachusetts, US
- PT Boat Museum, Fall River, Massachusetts, US
- Salem Maritime National Historic Site, Salem, Massachusetts, US
- Santa Barbara Maritime Museum, Santa Barbara, California, US
- Site historique maritime de la Pointe-au-Père, Rimouski, Quebec, Canada
- South Street Seaport, New York City, US
- Tahoe Maritime Museum, Homewood, California, US
- Tuckerton Seaport, Tuckerton, New Jersey, US
- United States Naval Academy Museum, Annapolis, Maryland, US
- U.S. Navy Submarine Force Library and Museum, Groton, Connecticut, US
- USS Constitution Museum, Boston, Massachusetts, US
- Vancouver Maritime Museum, Vancouver British Columbia, Canada
- Wisconsin Maritime Museum, Manitowoc, Wisconsin, US
- National Museum of the Great Lakes, Toledo, Ohio, US
- Great Lakes Shipwreck Museum, Whitefish Point Light, Michigan, US
- Ships of the Sea Maritime Museum, Savannah, Georgia, US

=== South America ===
- Mar del Plata Museum of the Sea, Mar del Plata, Argentina
- Museo Nao Victoria, Punta Arenas, Chile
- Museu Nacional do Mar, São Francisco do Sul, Brazil
- Museu Náutico, Rio Grande, Brazil
- Museu Naval, Rio de Janeiro, Brazil
- Museum of the Sea, Bogotá, Colombia
- Museum of the Sea, La Barra, Uruguay
- Naval Museum of Montevideo, Montevideo, Uruguay
- Naval Museum of Peru, Callao, Peru

== See also ==
- List of maritime museums in the United States
- List of museum ships
- List of former museum ships
- Museum ship
- National Maritime Museums
- Ship replica
- Ships preserved in museums
