= National Museum of the United States Navy =

Flagship museum of the United States Navy

U.S. Navy Museum
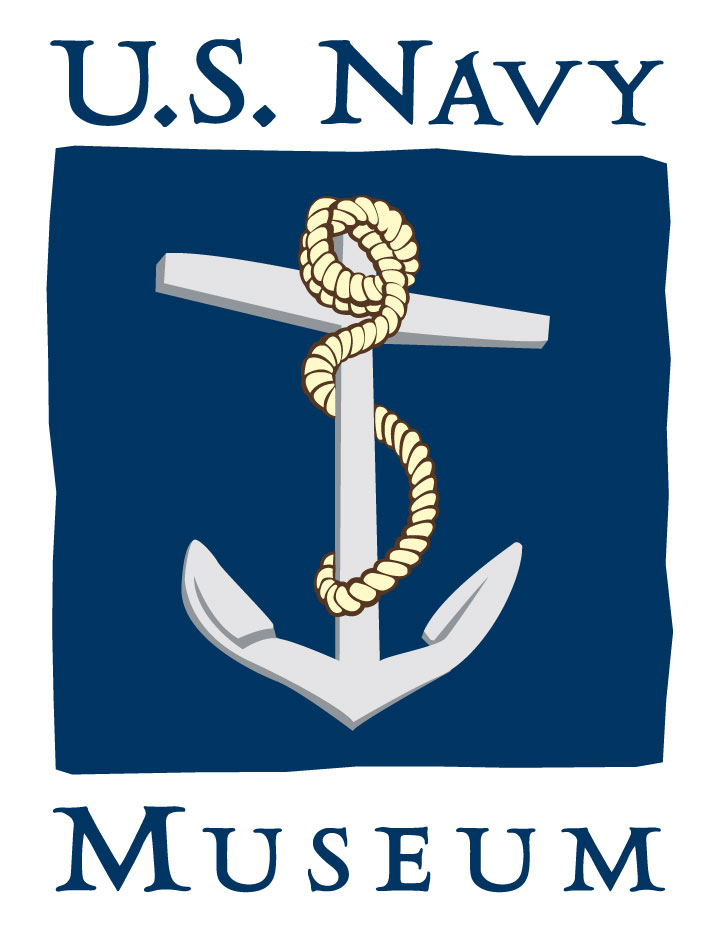
- U.S. Navy Museum logo

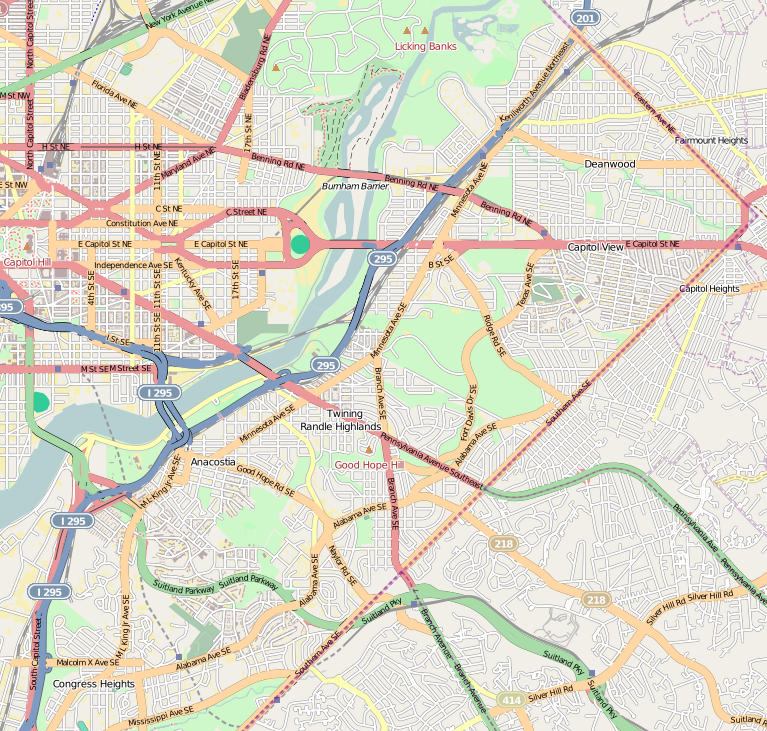
- Location within Washington, D.C.
- Established: 1961; 65 years ago
- Location: 736 Sicard St SE, Washington, DC 20374
- Coordinates: 38.8733°N 76.9953°W
- Type: United States Navy
- Public transit access: Navy Yard – Ballpark
- Website: U.S. Navy Museum

The National Museum of the United States Navy, or U.S. Navy Museum for short, is the flagship museum of the United States Navy and is located in the former Breech Mechanism Shop of the old Naval Gun Factory on the grounds of the Washington Navy Yard in Washington, D.C., United States.

The U.S. Navy Museum is one of ten official Navy museums, and is part of the Naval History and Heritage Command, the official history program of the United States Navy.

== Mission ==
The U.S. Navy Museum collects, preserves, displays, and interprets historic naval artifacts and artwork to inform, educate, and inspire naval personnel and the general public.

== History ==
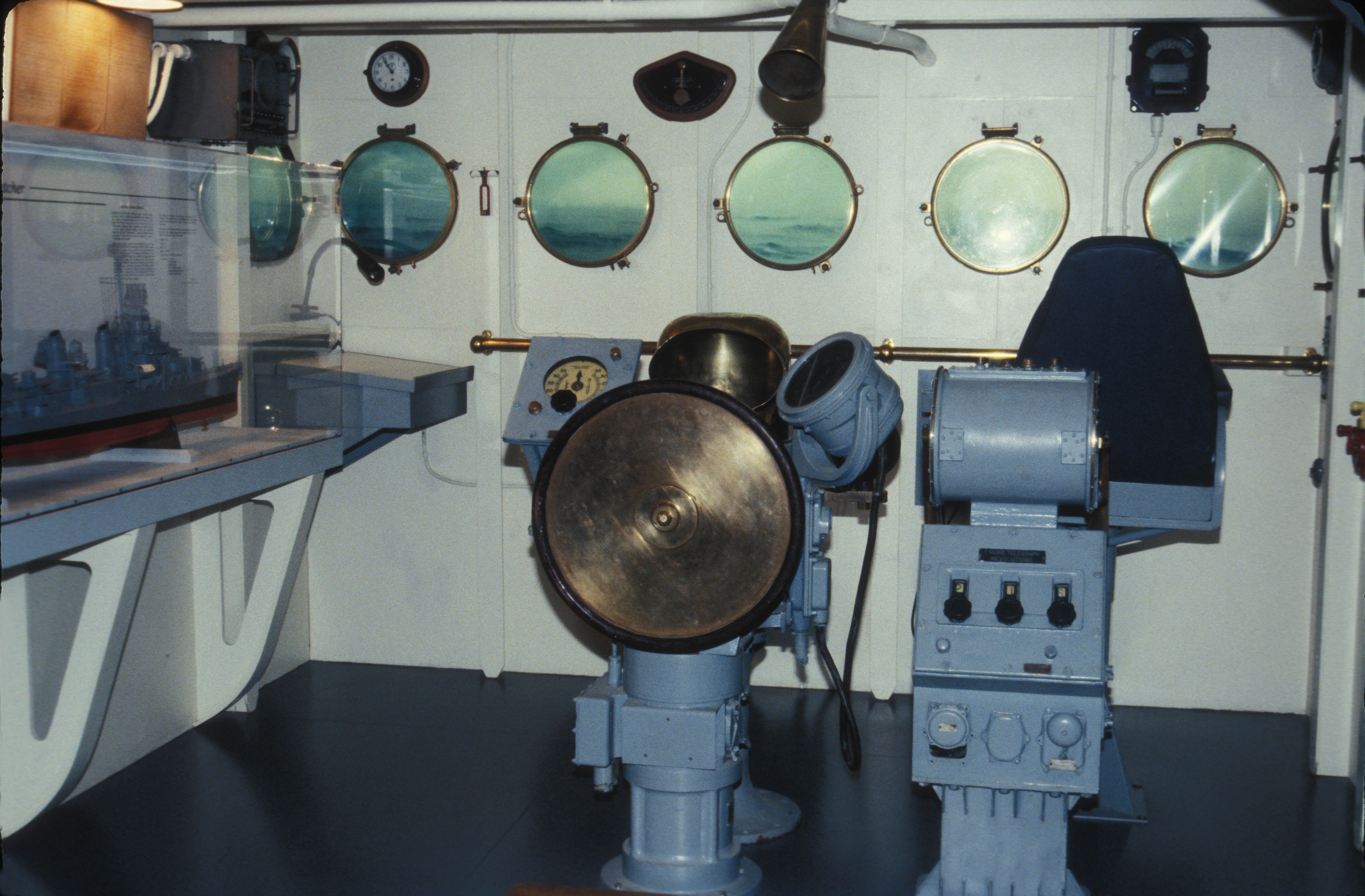
Bridge of the USS Fletcher at the museum

The U.S. Navy Museum was established in 1961 and opened to the public in 1963. As one of 15 Navy museums throughout the country, it is the only one that presents an overview of U. S. naval history. Permanent and temporary exhibitions commemorate the Navy's wartime heroes and battles as well as its peacetime contributions in exploration, diplomacy, space flight, navigation and humanitarian service.

Known for 40 years as the U.S. Navy flagship museum, The U.S. Navy Museum celebrates a legacy of educating the public. In the tradition of its predecessors on the Washington Navy Yard beginning in 1865, the current museum features a collection that dates from 1800. The museum's collection moved twice before Admiral Arleigh Burke established the current museum, Building 76, in 1963 to create an American naval history museum comparable to those in Europe. The U.S. Navy Museum continues to embody Burke's vision of sharing the Navy's history and traditions with the world.

The tradition of collecting naval artifacts in the United States began in the early 19th century under the command of Thomas Tingey, the first commandant of the Washington Navy Yard. The first artifact collected was a French gun, cast in 1793 at Lyons, captured during the Quasi-War with France, 1798–1801. From this modest beginning, the collection grew as the U.S. Navy fought in more battles and explored the high seas during the early years of the American republic.

As the Navy's collection of artifacts grew, so did the need for a space to display them. In 1865, the former Paint Shop opened as the Museum of Naval Relics and Weapons, where the Dispensary is today. This museum was amongst America's earliest federal museums. Listed as one of Washington's most popular tourist attractions in Morrison's Strangers Guide to Washington, the collection impressed visitors with such artifacts as a gun from Spanish conquistador Hernan Cortés (used during the Spanish conquest of the Aztec Empire), and the sloop Kearsarge's original sternpost containing a shell she received during her fight with the Confederate raider Alabama off the French coast.

In 1913 the museum's artifacts were moved to Building 120. The museum shared space with the Seaman Gunner's Quarters and the Recruiting Office. This site is now a parking lot west of the Washington Navy Yard. The building was demolished in 1927, which left the Navy's collection of artifacts in storage for eight years. In April 1935, the third museum opened in building 40, at the north end of the Breech Mechanism Shop constructed between 1887 and 1899. When World War II ended, the yard officially changed its name to the Naval Gun Factory. Hence, the museum became the Naval Gun Factory Museum. After gun production ceased, Admiral Burke obtained the entire building in 1961 to house a new and more complete collection of artifacts.

Today, the U.S. Navy Museum is the only naval museum to chronicle the U.S. Navy's history from its creation to the present. Artifacts like USS Constitution's fighting top, the world's deepest diving submersible, Trieste, and the khaki uniform of former Fleet Admiral Chester W. Nimitz make The Navy Museum's collection second to none.

Close to 94,000 individuals visit The U.S. Navy Museum annually. Admission to the museum and its programs is free. The museum is architecturally accessible.

== Visiting the National Museum of the U.S. Navy ==
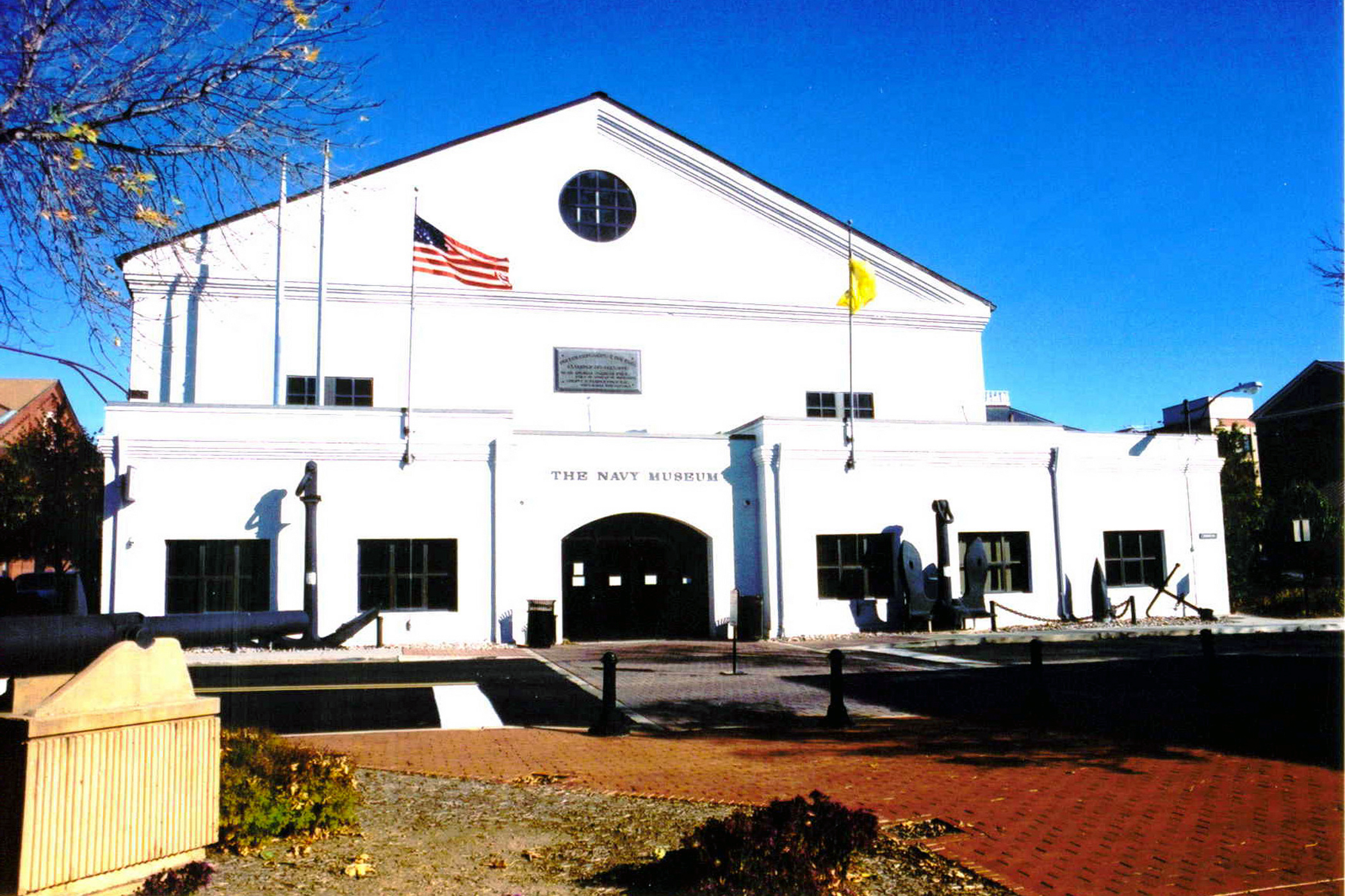
A view of the U.S. Navy Museum as seen from Willard Park. Periscopes from the submarine exhibit are visible to the left.

The National Museum of the United States Navy and the associated Cold War Gallery are open to the public. Both facilities closed in response to the COVID-19 pandemic on March 14, 2020, and reopened on June 1, 2021. Because the museum is on the grounds of an active military installation, visitors must either present valid government/military credentials, be accompanied by someone who has such credentials, or apply for a day pass at the on-site visitors' center. Upon entering the museum, visitors can see the fighting top from USS Constitution, as well as a statue of Boatswain's Mate Charles W. Riggin, made from melted dimes.

== Willard Park ==
Located between the U.S. Navy Museum and the waterfront, Willard Park is named for Admiral Arthur L. Willard, Commandant of the Navy Yard from 1927 to 1930. Alongside the many iron guns on display are a screw from the battleship USS South Dakota (BB-57), a 6-inch gun salvaged from the battleship USS Maine, a titanium pressure sphere from the Alvin undersea exploration vehicle, the Swift Boat PCF-1, and a 14-inch naval railway gun from the First World War.

== Permanent exhibits ==
=== Dive! Dive! U.S. Navy Submarines ===
This large room is dedicated entirely to the history of American submarines. The room features a pair of working periscopes, targeting computers, and battle flags.

=== The American Revolution and the French Alliance ===
The U.S. Navy's violent beginning is documented near the museum's entrance with a video kiosk, weapons, and depictions of early American Navy heroes.

=== The Forgotten Wars of the Nineteenth Century ===
This exhibit features artifacts from the Quasi-War with France, the First Barbary War and the Second Barbary War, the War of 1812, and the Mexican–American War. The centerpiece of this exhibit is a replica of USS Constitution gun deck.

=== Civil War ===
The Civil War exhibit shows the sorts of warships and equipment used by sailors of the Union and Confederate fleets. Models of the legendary ironclads USS Monitor and CSS Virginia, the commerce raider CSS Alabama, and the USS Kearsarge (1861) are on display.

=== Spanish–American War ===
This exhibit tells the story of the loss of the battleship USS Maine (ACR-1), public outrage and the beginning of the United States as a global power. On display are several weapons, items from the home front, a model and diagram of the strange USS Vesuvius (1888), and the uniform of Admiral George Dewey.

=== Polar Exploration ===
The story of Admiral Richard Byrd's 1928 voyage to the South Pole is told through photographs and equipment from his and other subsequent voyages.

=== Navigation ===
Vitally crucial throughout history, navigational techniques and various pieces of equipment are explained in a small exhibit on the history of navigation at sea. The room is filled with charts, chronometers, and meteorological equipment.

=== U.S. Navy in World War I ===
This exhibit detailing the U.S. Navy's brief involvement in the First World War explains the dangerous task of submarine-hunting and showcases models of warships of the period, a captured German flag, and footage of a U.S. Navy railway gun in action.

=== In Harm's Way, The Navy in World War II ===
The most extensive section of the museum, In Harm's Way, is divided into three sections.

- The Atlantic Theater. This exhibit details convoy protection, the capture of U-505, the breaking of the German Enigma code, and the role of the Merchant Marine, as well as weapons and equipment used by both sides of the war for Europe. A wide variety of cannon, rifles and sidearms are on display along with a high-altitude flying suit, the diving log of U-505 and the XAF Radar Receiver from the battleship USS New York (BB-34).
- The Home Front. Featuring a replica storefront and a small theater showing a film from the World War II period, the home front exhibit is decorated with patriotic posters, aircraft identification models, and personal items. The role of WAVES is detailed in the exhibit.
- The Pacific Theater. The area dedicated to the war in the Pacific dominates the World War II section of the museum, featuring a full-size replica of the bridge of the destroyer USS Fletcher, four gun batteries, an FG-1D Corsair, a Japanese MXY7 Ohka kamikaze aircraft, two atomic bomb casings, and models of the carrier USS Leyte (CV-32) and battleship USS Missouri (BB-63), each around twenty feet in length.

=== Korea 1950–1953: The Navy in the Forgotten War ===
Uniforms and equipment, along with videos and other artifacts, bring the often-ignored Korean War into focus. Captured Soviet weapons, models of aircraft and warships, and a piece of the Inchon seawall are on display.

== Other exhibits ==
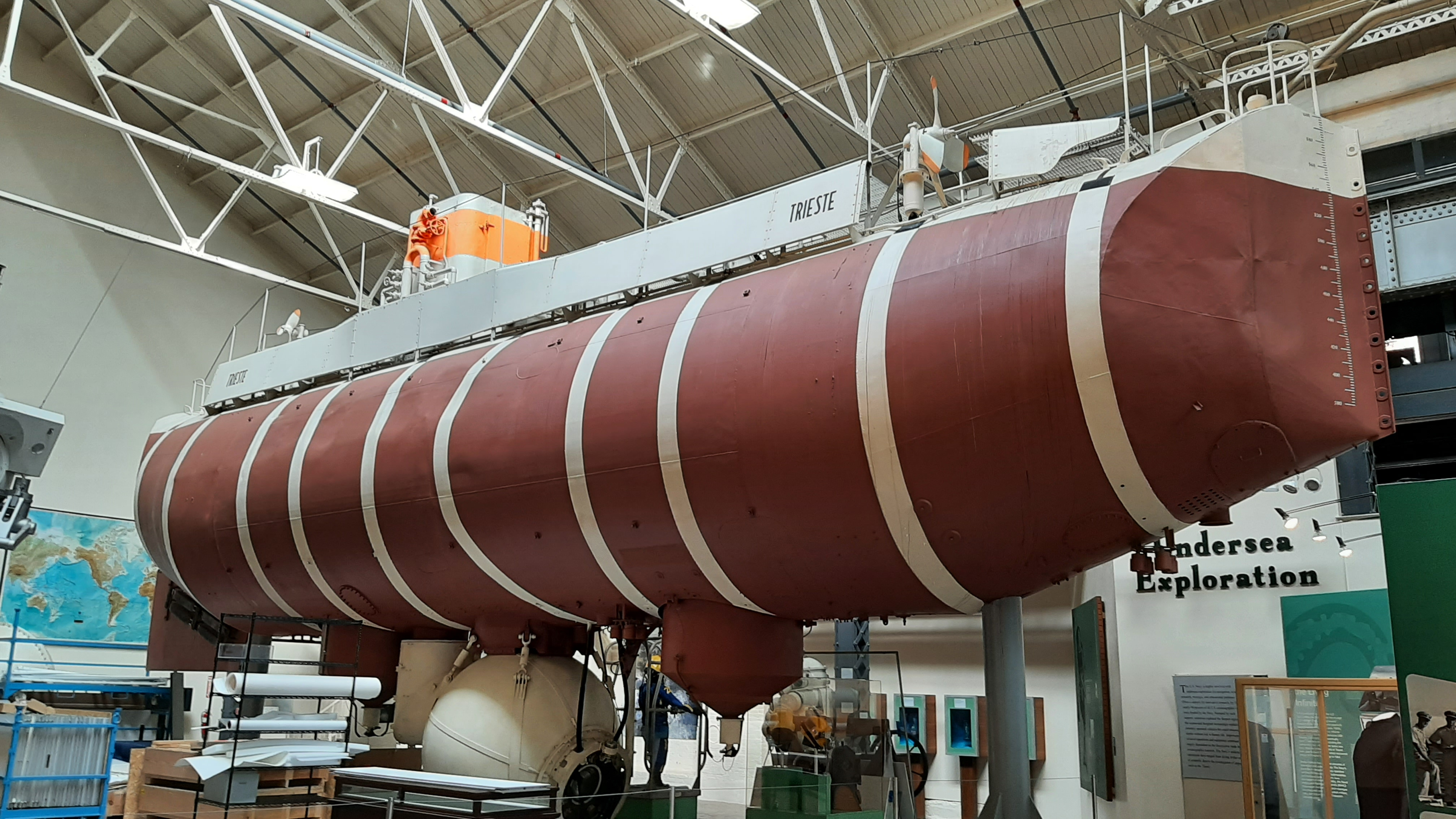
The display of Trieste seen at the museum's Undersea Exploration exhibit.

The deep submergence vehicle Trieste is the highlight of the Undersea Exploration exhibit. A small exhibit on the Steel Navy (1883–1909) is in the north end, as well as on the Battle of Trafalgar, which features a short film on naval artillery based on the 2003 film Master and Commander: The Far Side of the World.

== In popular culture ==
The Navy Museum was featured in Ephemera, the Season 17 Episode 16 episode of the CBS TV series NCIS.

== Future plans ==
On October 13, 2020, then-United States Secretary of the Navy Kenneth Braithwaite announced that a new National Museum of the United States Navy would be designed and built, with construction and installation tentatively slated for 2025. He stated that the facility will be located near the Washington Navy Yard, but outside its security perimeter so that visitors can enter without the need for credentials or a day pass.

== Other Navy museums ==
There are nine other official Navy museums:

- Hampton Roads Naval Museum – Norfolk, VA
- National Museum of the American Sailor (formerly Great Lakes Naval Museum) – Naval Station Great Lakes, IL
- National Naval Aviation Museum – Pensacola, FL
- Naval Undersea Museum – Keyport, WA
- Naval War College Museum – Newport, RI
- Puget Sound Navy Museum – Bremerton, WA
- Submarine Force Museum and Historic Ship Nautilus – Groton, CT
- U.S. Naval Academy Museum – Annapolis, MD
- U.S. Navy Seabee Museum – Port Hueneme, CA

The following museums are not listed on the list of "Official U.S. Naval Museums" in the footnote at the top of this section:

- National Museum of the Surface Navy on Battleship USS Iowa - Los Angeles, CA
- U.S. Navy Memorial Museum – Washington, DC
- USS Constitution ("Old Ironsides") – Boston, MA
- Navy Art Collection – Washington Navy Yard, Washington, DC
- USS Cavalla Submarine & USS Stewart Destroyer Escort - Seawolf Park Galveston Naval Museum, Galveston, TX

== See also ==
=== In general ===
- Category: United States Navy museums
  - History of the United States Navy
  - Category: Naval ships of the United States
- Category: Marine Corps museums in the United States
  - National Museum of the Marine Corps
- National Museum of the United States Air Force
- National Museum of the United States Army

=== Aircraft carrier museums ===
- USS Hornet Museum; Alameda, California – USS Hornet (CV-12)
- Intrepid Sea, Air & Space Museum; New York City – USS Intrepid (CV-11)
- USS Lexington Museum on the Bay; Corpus Christi, Texas – USS Lexington (CV-16)
- USS Midway Museum; San Diego, California – USS Midway (CV-41)
- Patriots Point; Charleston, South Carolina – USS Yorktown (CV-10)

=== Battleship museums ===
- Battleship Memorial Park; Mobile, Alabama – USS Alabama (BB-60)
- Battleship USS Iowa Museum; San Pedro, California - USS Iowa (BB-61)
- Battleship Cove; Fall River, Massachusetts – USS Massachusetts (BB-59)
- Battleship Missouri Memorial; Pearl Harbor, Hawaii – USS Missouri (BB-63)
- Battleship New Jersey Museum and Memorial; Camden, New Jersey – USS New Jersey (BB-62)
- USS North Carolina Battleship Memorial; Wilmington, North Carolina – USS North Carolina (BB-55)
- San Jacinto State Park; LaPorte, Texas – USS Texas (BB-35)
- Nauticus Maritime Center; Norfolk, Virginia – USS Wisconsin (BB-64)
- See also: USS Arizona Memorial, USS Maine (1889)#Memorials, USS South Dakota (BB-57)#Post-war

=== Other museums ===
- Buffalo and Erie County Naval & Military Park – USS Little Rock, USS The Sullivans, USS Croaker
- National Civil War Naval Museum at Port Columbus
- National Museum of the Pacific War (Admiral Nimitz State Historic Site)
- Pearl Harbor National Memorial
- Soldiers and Sailors National Military Museum and Memorial
- United States Naval Shipbuilding Museum – USS Salem (CA-139) (heavy cruiser)
- USS Kidd Veterans Museum, Baton Rouge, Louisiana – USS Kidd (DD-661) (destroyer)
- USS Becuna (SS-319) (submarine)
- USS Cod (SS-224) (submarine)
- USS Edson (DD-946) (destroyer)
- USS Nautilus (SSN-571) (submarine) – see Submarine Force Museum
- USS Olympia (C-6) (cruiser)
- USS Orleck (DD-886) (destroyer) - Jacksonville, Florida
- USS Requin (SS-481) (submarine)
- USS Turner Joy (DD-951) (destroyer)
- USS Slater (DE-766) (Destroyer escort)
- War in the Pacific National Historical Park
- Wings of Freedom Aviation Museum
- Wisconsin Maritime Museum – USS Cobia (SS-245) (submarine)
- Category:Naval museums in the United States
- List of museum ships (sortable by nationality or country of location)
