= USS Wisconsin (BB-64) =

Iowa-class battleship

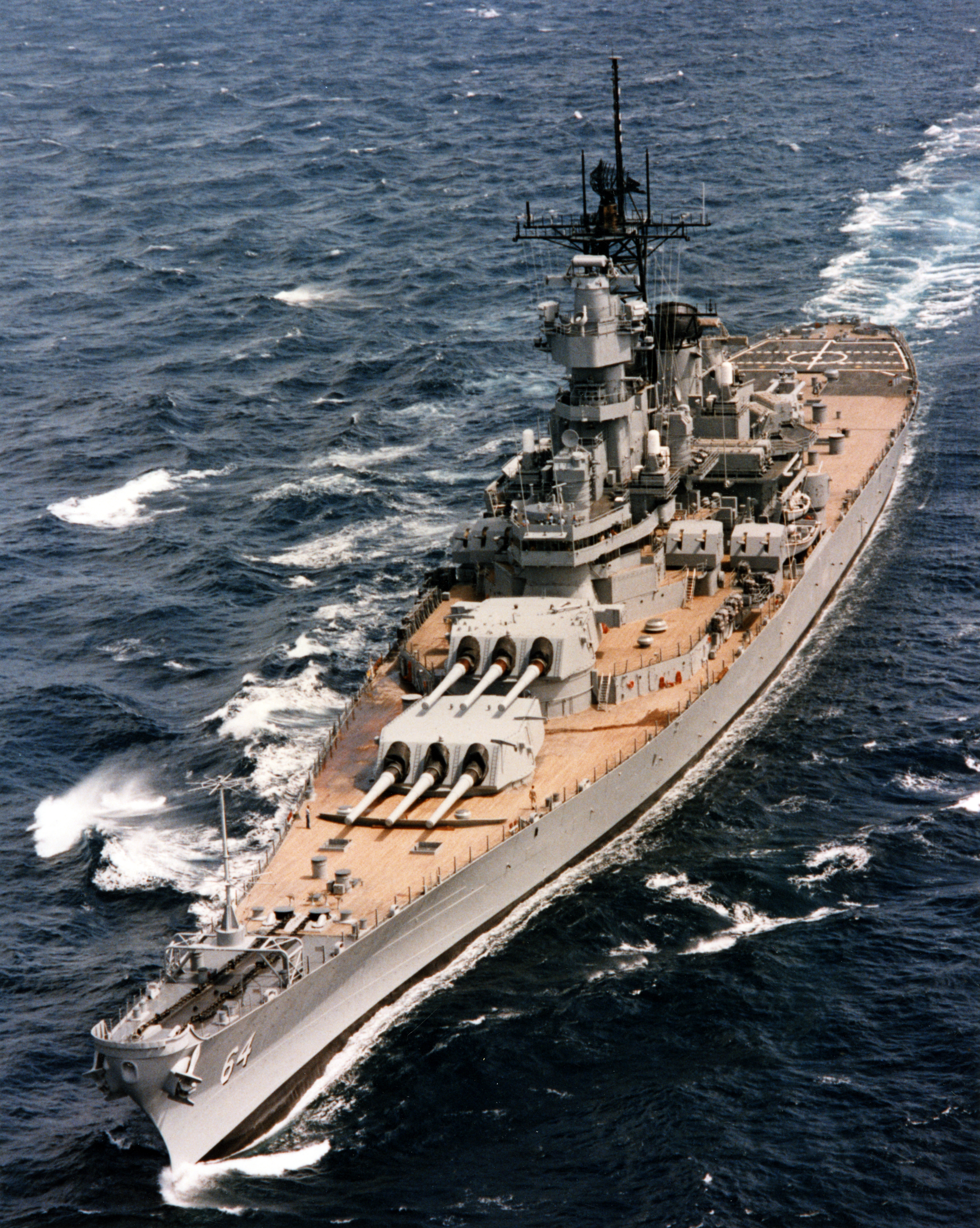
- Wisconsin at sea, c. 1990

History

United States
- Namesake: State of Wisconsin
- Ordered: 12 June 1940
- Builder: Philadelphia Naval Shipyard
- Laid down: 25 January 1941
- Launched: 7 December 1943
- Commissioned: 16 April 1944
- Decommissioned: 1 July 1948
- Recommissioned: 3 March 1951
- Decommissioned: 8 March 1958
- Recommissioned: 22 October 1988
- Decommissioned: 30 September 1991
- Stricken: 17 March 2006
- Identification: Callsign: NUGW; Hull number: BB-64
- Motto: "Forward for Freedom"
- Nickname(s): "Big Wisky"
- Honors and awards: 6 Battle Stars
- Status: Museum ship at Nauticus, Virginia
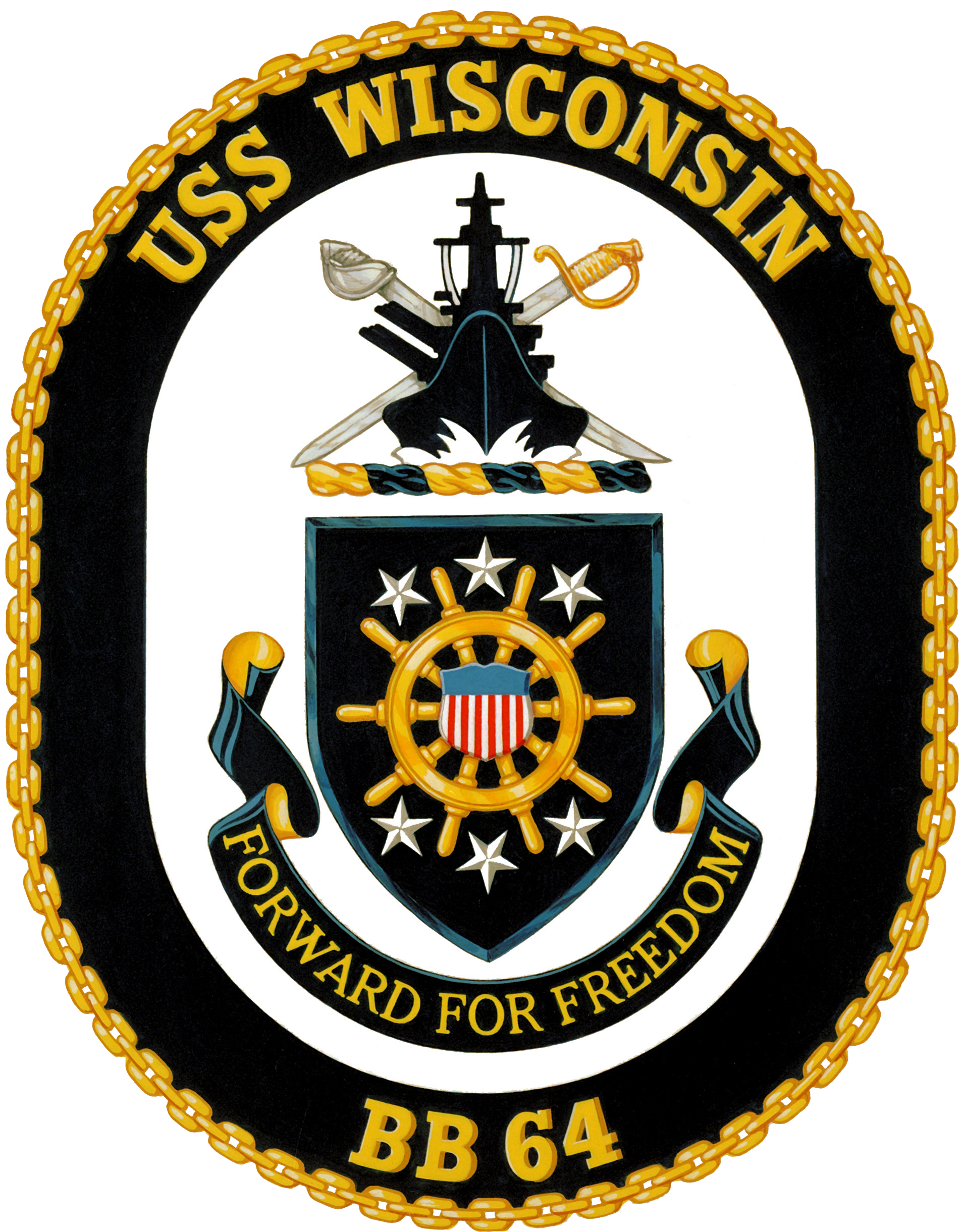
- Badge

General characteristics (as built)
- Class & type: Iowa-class battleship
- Displacement: 57,216 long tons (58,134 t) (full load)
- Length: 887 ft 3 in (270.4 m) (o/a)
- Beam: 108 ft 2 in (33 m)
- Draft: 37 ft 9 in (11.5 m) (full load)
- Installed power: 8 × Babcock & Wilcox boilers; 212,000 shp (158,000 kW)
- Propulsion: 4 × geared steam turbines; 4 × screw propellers
- Speed: 32.5 knots (60.2 km/h; 37.4 mph)
- Range: 15,000 nmi (28,000 km; 17,000 mi) at 15 knots (28 km/h; 17 mph)
- Complement: 117 officers, 1,804 enlisted men (designed)
- Sensors & processing systems: 1 × SK-2 early-warning radar; 2 × SG surface-search radars; 2 × Mk-8 fire-control radars; 4 × Mk-12 fire-control radars; 4 × Mk-22 height-finder radars; 1 × Mk-27 fire-control radar
- Armament: 3 × triple 16 in (406 mm) guns; 10 × twin 5 in (127 mm) DP guns; 20 × quadruple 40 mm (1.6 in) AA guns; 49 × single 20 mm (0.8 in) AA guns
- Armor: Waterline belt: 12.1 in (307 mm); Bulkheads: 14.5 in (368 mm); Barbettes: 11.6–17.3 in (295–439 mm); Turrets: 19.5 in (495 mm); Decks: 4.75–6.2 in (121–157 mm)

General characteristics (1988)
- Complement: 1,515 officers and enlisted men
- Sensors & processing systems: 1 × AN/SPS-49 early-warning radar; 1 × AN/SPS-67 surface-search radar; 2 × Mk-13 fire-control radars; 4 × Mk-25 fire-control radars
- Electronic warfare & decoys: AN/SLQ-32 EW suite; AN/SLQ-25 Nixie torpedo decoy; 8 × chaff rocket launchers
- Armament: 3 × triple 16 in (406 mm) guns; 6 × twin 5 in (127 mm) DP guns; 8 × quadruple BGM-109 Tomahawk cruise missiles; 4 × quadruple RGM-84 Harpoon anti-ship missiles; 4 × single 20 mm Phalanx CIWS
- USS Wisconsin (BB-64)
- U.S. National Register of Historic Places
- Virginia Landmarks Register
- Location within Virginia Location within the United States
- Location: 1 Waterside Dr., Norfolk, Virginia
- Coordinates: 36°50′54″N 76°17′43″W
- Built: 1941
- Architect: Bureau of Construction and Repair
- Architectural style: Iowa-class battleship
- NRHP reference No.: 12000178
- VLR No.: 122-5414

Significant dates
- Added to NRHP: 28 March 2012
- Designated VLR: 15 December 2011

USS Wisconsin (BB-64) is an Iowa-class battleship built for the United States Navy (USN) in the 1940s and is currently a museum ship. Completed in 1944, the ship was assigned to the Pacific Theater during World War II, where she participated in the Philippines campaign and the Battles of Iwo Jima and Okinawa. The battleship shelled the Japanese home islands shortly before the end of the war in September 1945. During the Korean War, Wisconsin shelled North Korean targets in support of United Nations and South Korean ground operations, after which she was decommissioned. She was reactivated in 1986; after a modernization program, she participated in Operation Desert Storm in January – February 1991.

Wisconsin was last decommissioned in September 1991 after spending a total of 14 years in active service. In that time, the ship earned six battle stars for service in World War II and Korea, as well as a Navy Unit Commendation for service during the January/February 1991 Gulf War. Wisconsin was stricken from the Naval Vessel Register on 17 March 2006, and was later donated for permanent use as a museum ship. As of 2026, Wisconsin is a museum ship operated by Nauticus in Norfolk, Virginia.

== Background and description ==
The Iowa class of fast battleships was designed in the late 1930s in response to the US Navy's expectations for a future war with the Empire of Japan. The last battleships to be built by the United States, they were also the US Navy's largest and fastest vessels of the type. American officers preferred comparatively slow but heavily armed and armored battleships, but Navy planners determined that such a fleet would have difficulty in bringing the faster Japanese fleet to battle, particularly the Kongō-class battlecruisers and the aircraft carriers of the 1st Air Fleet. Design studies prepared during the development of the earlier North Carolina and South Dakota classes demonstrated the difficulty in resolving the desires of fleet officers with those of the planning staff within the displacement limits imposed by the Washington Naval Treaty system, which had governed capital ship construction since 1923. An escalator clause in the Second London Naval Treaty of 1936 allowed an increase from 35,000 long tons (36,000 t) to 45,000 long tons (46,000 t) in the event that any member nation refused to sign the treaty, which Japan refused to do.

Wisconsin is 887 feet 3 inches (270.4 m) long overall and is 860 feet (262.1 m) long at the waterline. The ship has a beam of 108 ft 2 in (33 m) and a draft of 37 ft 9 in (11.5 m) at her full combat load of 57,540 long tons (58,460 t). The Iowa-class ships are powered by four General Electric geared steam turbines, each driving one screw propeller using steam provided by eight oil-fired Babcock & Wilcox boilers. Rated at 212,000 shaft horsepower (158,000 kW), the turbines were designed to give a top speed of 32.5 knots (60.2 km/h; 37.4 mph), but were built to handle a 20 percent overload. None of the Iowas ever ran speed trials in deep water, but the Bureau of Ships estimated that they could reach a speed of about 34 knots (63 km/h; 39 mph) from 225,000 shp (168,000 kW) at a light displacement of 51,209 long tons (52,031 t). The ships had a designed cruising range of 15,000 nautical miles (28,000 km; 17,000 mi) at a speed of 15 knots (28 km/h; 17 mph), although Wisconsin's half sister New Jersey's fuel consumption figures during her sea trials suggest that her range was at least 20,150 nmi (37,320 km; 23,190 mi) at that cruising speed. Their designed crew numbered 117 officers and 1,804 enlisted men, and greatly increased by the end of the war in 1945. Wisconsin's crew at that time numbered 173 officers and 2,738 sailors.

=== Armament, fire control, sensors and aircraft ===
The main battery of the Iowa-class ships consisted of nine 16 in (406 mm)/50-caliber Mark 7 guns (Note: /50 refers to the length of the gun in terms of calibers. A /50 gun is 50 times long as its bore diameter.) in three triple-gun turrets on the centerline, two of which were placed in a superfiring pair forward of the superstructure, with the third aft. Going from bow to stern, the turrets were designated I, II, and III. Their secondary battery consisted of twenty 5 in (127 mm)/38-caliber dual-purpose guns mounted in twin-gun turrets clustered amidships, five turrets on each broadside. Unlike their half sisters Iowa and New Jersey that were the first pair of ships built, Missouri and Wisconsin were completed with an anti-aircraft suite of twenty quadruple mounts for 40 mm (1.6 in) Bofors AA guns, nine mounts on each broadside and one each on the roofs of Turrets II and III. Forty-nine 20-millimeter (0.8 in) Oerlikon light AA auto-cannon in single mounts were distributed almost the length of the ships.

The primary means of controlling the main armament are two Mark 38 directors for the Mark 38 fire-control system mounted at the tops of the fore and aft fire-control towers in the superstructure. These directors were equipped with 25-foot-6-inch-long (7.8 m) rangefinders, although their primary sensor was the Mark 8 fire-control radar mounted on their roofs. A secondary Mark 40 fire-control director was installed inside the armored conning tower at the front of the superstructure that used the Mark 27 fire-control radar positioned on the top of the conning tower. Each turret is fitted with a rangefinder 46 feet (14 m) long and can act as a director for the other turrets. Four Mark 37 gunnery directors, two on the centerline at the ends of the superstructure and one on each broadside, control the five-inch guns. Each director was equipped with a 15-foot (4.6 m) rangefinder and a pair of radars on its roof. These were a Mark 12 fire-control system and a Mark 22 height-finder radar. Each 40 mm mount was remotely controlled by a Mark 51 director that incorporated a Mark 14 lead-computing gyro gunsight while the sailors that used the 20 mm gun used a Mark 14 sight to track their targets.

An SK-2 early-warning radar was fitted on the ship's foremast; above it was a SG surface-search radar. The other SG radar was mounted at the top of the mainmast positioned on the rear funnel.

The Iowas were built with two rotating aircraft catapults on their stern for floatplanes and a large crane was fitted to recover them. Initially a trio of Vought OS2U Kingfishers were carried, but these were replaced by Curtiss SC Seahawks in December 1944.

=== Protection ===
The internal waterline armor belt of the Iowa-class ships is 12.1 in (307 mm) thick and has a height of 10 ft 6 in (3.2 m). Below it is a strake of Class B homogeneous armor plate that tapers in thickness from 12.1 inches at the top to 1.62 in (41 mm) at the bottom and is 28 ft (8.5 m) high. The two strakes of armor are inclined outwards at the top 19 degrees to improve the armor's resistance to horizontal fire. In general the vertical armor plates are made from Class A cemented armor and the horizontal armor from Class B or Special treatment steel (STS). The belt armor extends to the two transverse bulkheads fore and aft of the main-gun barbettes, forming the armored citadel. Part of the lower armor belt extends aft from the rear bulkhead to protect the ships' steering gear. Its maximum thickness ranges from 13 to 13.5 in (330 to 343 mm) at the top and the plates taper to 5 inches at the bottom. Unlike the Iowa and New Jersey, the armor plates in the forward transverse bulkhead in Missouri and Wisconsin have a maximum thickness of 14.5 in (368 mm) at the top that tapers to 11.7 in (297 mm). The aft bulkhead is a consistent 14.5 inches in thickness, but does not go below the lower belt extension due it meeting the armored third deck protecting the shafts and steering gears; the steering gear is closed by another 14.5-inch aft bulkhead.

The main-gun turrets have Class B plates 19.5 in (495 mm) thick on their faces and 9.5 in (241 mm) of Class A plates on their sides. The armor plates protecting their barbettes range in thickness from 17.3 in (439 mm) to 14.8 in (376 mm) and 11.6 in (295 mm) with the thickest plates on the sides and the thinnest ones on the front and back. The sides of the conning tower are 17.3 in (440 mm) thick. The main deck of the Iowas consists of 1.5 in (38 mm) of STS. Below this deck, the roof of the armored citadel is formed by 6 in (152 mm) of armor in two layers. Below this is a deck of 0.625-inch (16 mm) STS plates intended to stop splinters from shells that pierced the armored deck above it. The armor deck extends aft and the roof of the steering gear compartment is 6.2 in (160 mm) thick.

The underwater protection system of the Iowa-class battleships consists of three watertight compartments outboard of the lower armor belt and another behind it. The two outermost compartment are kept loaded with fuel oil or seawater to absorb the energy of the torpedo warhead's detonation and slow the resulting splinters so they can be stopped by the lower armor belt. Behind the belt is a holding bulkhead intended to protect the ships' inner spaces from any splinters that might penetrate and the subsequent flooding. For protection against naval mines, the Iowas have a double bottom that runs the full length of the ships and increases to a triple bottom except at the bow and stern.

== History ==
=== Construction ===
Wisconsin was the second ship of the United States Navy to be named after the US state of Wisconsin. The ship was authorized by Congress in 1938 and ordered on 12 June 1940 with the hull number BB-64. Her keel was laid down on 25 January 1941, at the Philadelphia Navy Yard. She was launched on 7 December 1943, sponsored by Mrs. Goodland, wife of Walter S. Goodland, the governor of Wisconsin, and commissioned on 16 April 1944, with Captain Earl E. Stone in command.

Wisconsin is numerically the highest-numbered US battleship built. Although her keel was laid after Missouri's, she was commissioned before Missouri's commissioning date. Wisconsin was commissioned on 16 April 1944, while Missouri was commissioned on 11 June of the same year. Thus, Wisconsin's construction began after Missouri's, and finished earlier. Iowa and Wisconsin were finally stricken from the Naval Vessel Register on 17 March 2006, making them the last battleships in service in the world.

=== World War II (1944–1945) ===
==== Shakedown and service with 3rd Fleet, Admiral Halsey ====
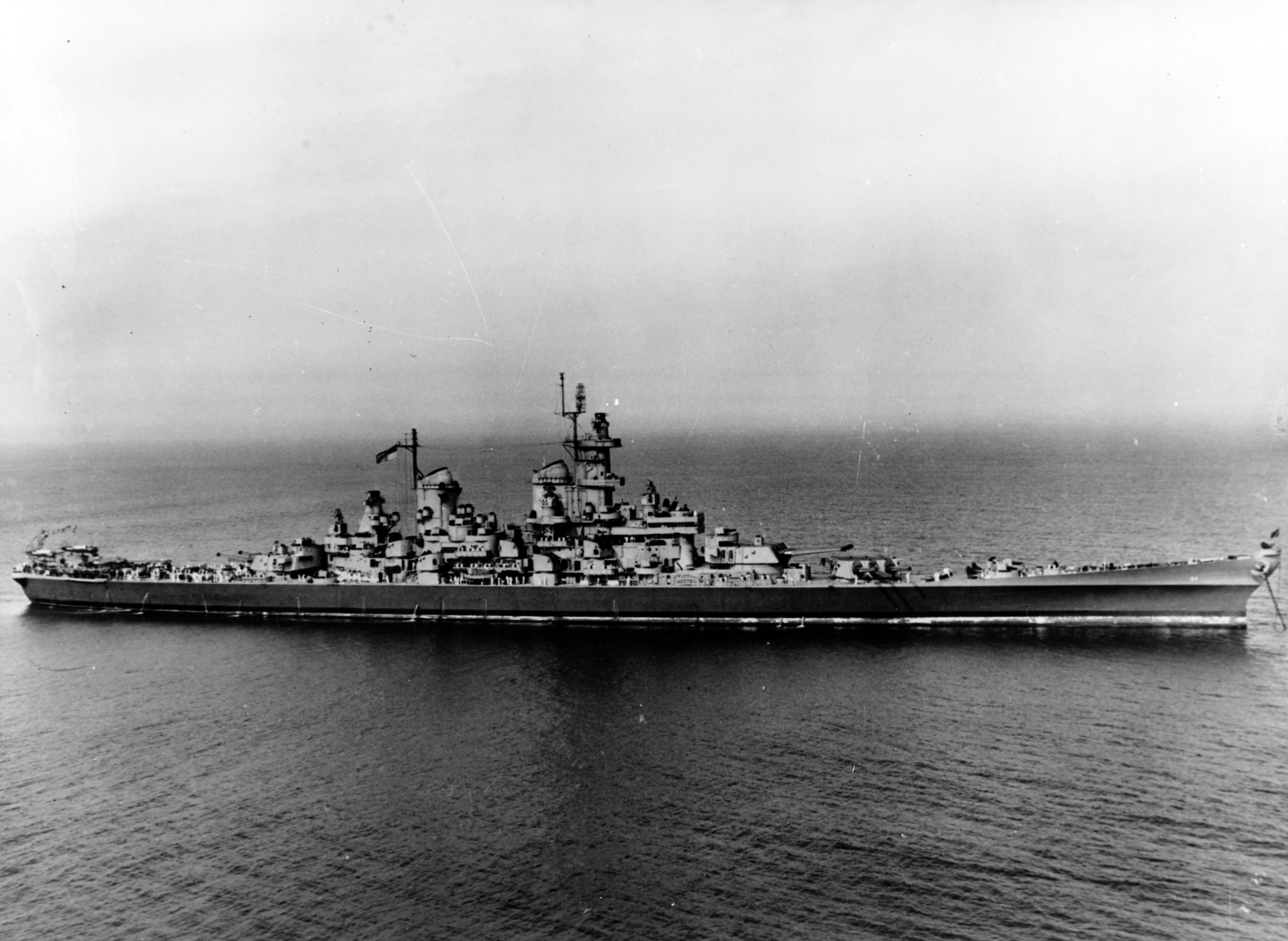
Wisconsin at anchor during her initial sea trials in mid-1944

After the ship's trials and initial training in the Chesapeake Bay, Wisconsin departed Norfolk, Virginia, on 7 July 1944, bound for the British West Indies. Following her shakedown cruise (conducted out of Trinidad), she returned to the builder's yard for alterations and repairs. On 24 September, Wisconsin sailed for the West Coast, transiting the Panama Canal, and reporting for duty with the Pacific Fleet on 2 October. The battleship later steamed to Hawaiian waters for training exercises and then headed for the Western Caroline Islands. Rear Admiral Edward Hanson, commander of Battleship Division 9, hoisted his flag aboard Wisconsin on 25 November. Shortly after reaching Ulithi, she was assigned to Task Group (TG) 38.2, part of Admiral William F. Halsey's 3rd Fleet's Fast Carrier Task Force (TF 38), on 11 December. Her primary duty was to serve as part of the anti-aircraft screen for the carriers. In addition to guarding the carriers, Wisconsin and the other battleships acted as oilers for the escorting destroyers, since the fleet's logistics train could not accompany the strike force during raids. The battleship arrived in time to participate in the Philippines campaign. As a part of that operation, the planners had envisioned landings on the southwest coast of Mindoro, south of Luzon, which would allow American forces to interdict Japanese lines of communication through the South China Sea.

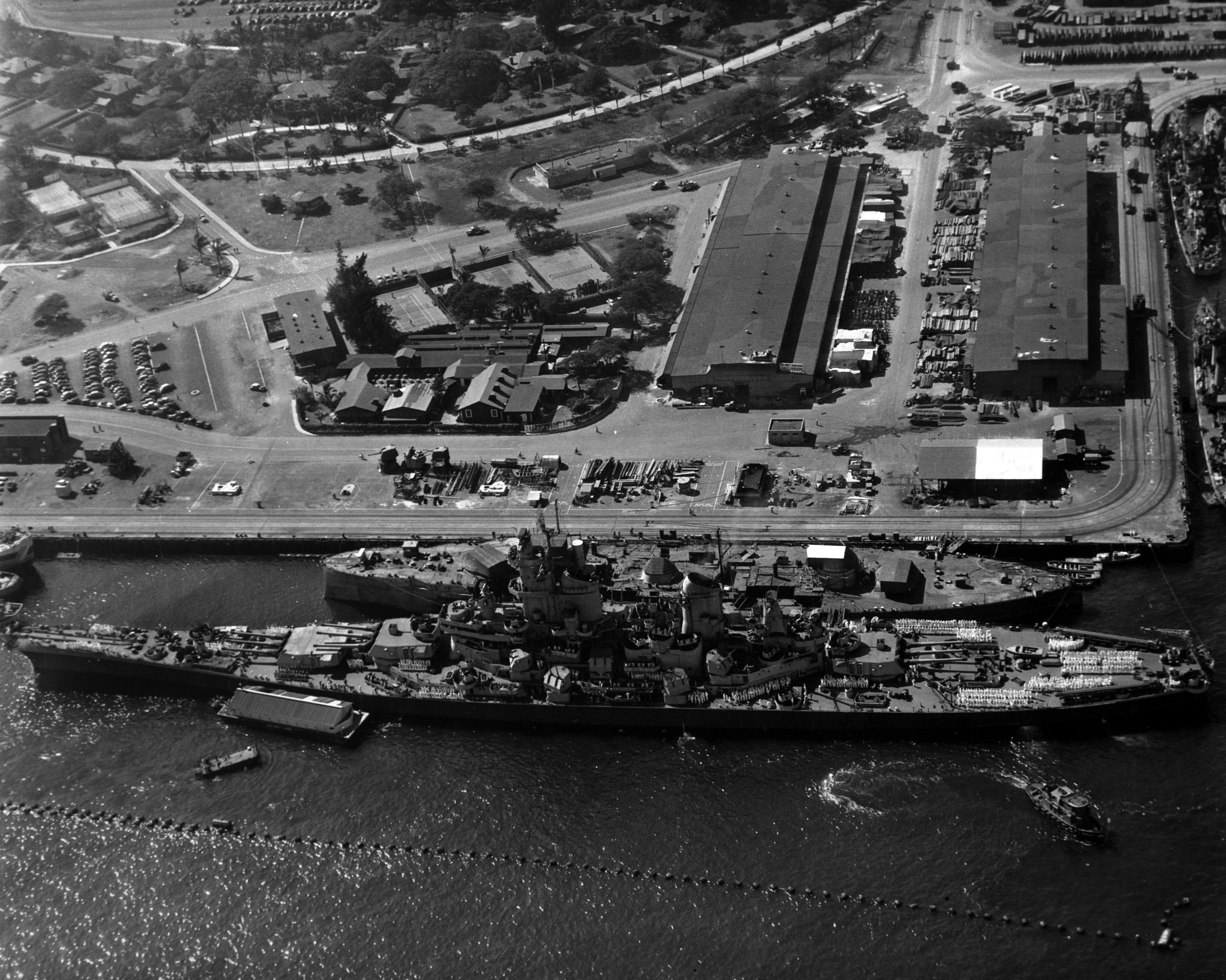
Wisconsin tied up alongside the hulk of the salvaged battleship Oklahoma at Pearl Harbor in November 1944, prior to her departure to join up with the 3rd Fleet.

The carriers had just completed three days of heavy raids against Japanese airfields, suppressing enemy aircraft during the amphibious operations against Mindoro and had withdrawn to begin refueling at sea on 17 December about 300 miles (480 km) east of Luzon in the Philippine Sea. The task force was struck by Typhoon Cobra the following day. The small but violent typhoon surprised the task force while many of the ships were attempting to refuel. Three destroyers capsized while nine other ships were seriously damaged. Wisconsin was not damaged, but reported two injured sailors as a result of the typhoon.

TF 38 attacked Japanese airfields in Formosa, Okinawa, and the Sakishima Islands with TG 38.2 tasked to cover southern Formosa and the Pescadore Islands beginning on 3 January 1945 to destroy aircraft that the Japanese had concentrated there to attack any amphibious landings on Luzon Island. The Americans caught the Japanese by surprise and claimed to have destroyed 170 aircraft that had been unable to take-off due to bad weather in two days of airstrikes. TF 38 withdrew to refuel on 5 January while the Japanese aircraft based on Luzon were attacking the ships of the 7th Fleet with some effect. The 7th Fleet was approaching Lingayen Gulf to conduct an amphibious landing of Luzon.

TF 38 was able to so thoroughly suppress the airfields on Luzon on 6–7 January that the landings were undisrupted by Japanese aircraft when they began on 9 January. The ships refueled on 8 January while moving northwards for another round of attacks on Formosa and Okinawa that began the following day with TG 38.2 this time attacking northern Formosa. This time they also attacked Japanese shipping. The task force entered the South China Sea on the night of 9/10 January to execute the next phase of Halsey's plan to interdict Japanese shipping lanes and destroy the Japanese forces defending the area, specifically including any capital ships of the Imperial Japanese Navy, as naval intelligence had reported two hybrid carrier/battleships, Ise and Hyūga, at Cam Ranh Bay in occupied French Indochina.

Halsey tasked Wisconsin's carrier group with closing to 50 kilometres (31 mi) of the Indochinese coast on 12 January while the rest of TF 38 supported TG 38.2 and attacked other targets further north. Halsey also formed a surface action group from TG 38.2 with Wisconsin and New Jersey and five cruisers to bombard Cam Ranh Bay under cover of the morning's airstrikes, but night reconnaissance aircraft revealed well before dawn that the two hybrids were no longer there and their mission was canceled. They resumed their escort duties, but surprise was complete and no Japanese aircraft attacked TG 38.2. TF 38 withdrew shortly after sunset and refueled the following day in the middle of the South China Sea despite another typhoon in the area.

Formosa was raided again on 15 January, and 21 January. Throughout January Wisconsin shielded the carriers as they conducted air raids at Hong Kong, Canton, Hainan Island, the Canton oil refineries, the Hong Kong Naval Station, and Okinawa.

==== Service with 5th Fleet, Admiral Spruance ====
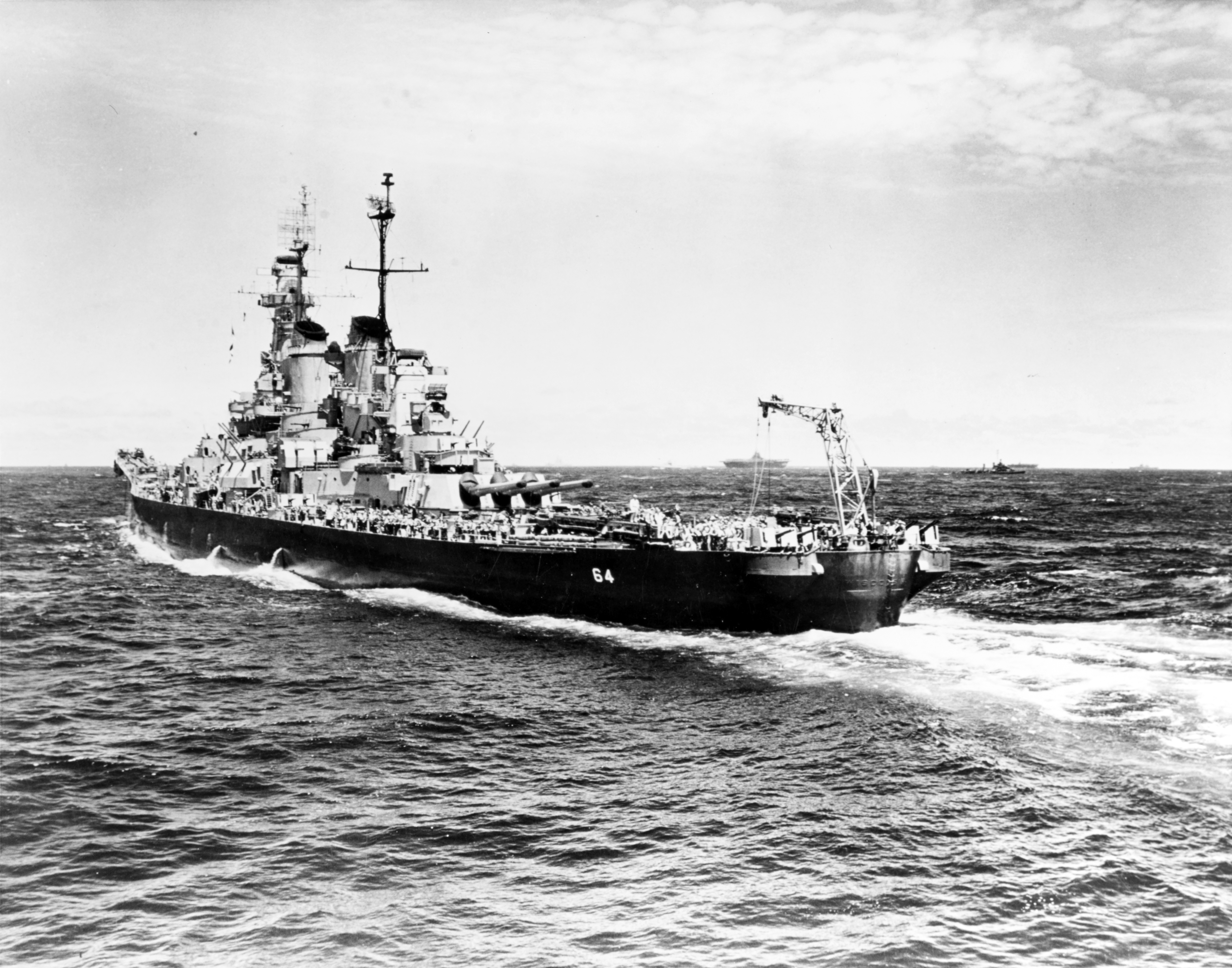
Wisconsin escorting Essex-class aircraft carriers during World War II.

Wisconsin was assigned to the 5th Fleet when Admiral Raymond A. Spruance relieved Admiral Halsey as commander of the fleet while it was anchored in Ulithi. She moved northward with the redesignated TG 58.2 as the carriers departed for the Tokyo area on 10 February. The ship was transferred to TF 59 under Vice Admiral Willis Lee three days later, covering the carriers of TF 58 as they attacked targets around Tokyo and on Chichijima between 16 and 25 February to prevent the Japanese from reinforcing Iwo Jima. On 20 February Captain John W. Roper relieved Stone, and the 5th Fleet arrived back at Ulithi on 4 March to resupply.

Still assigned to TF 59, Wisconsin departed Ulithi on 14 March bound for Japan. Their mission was to neutralize or destroy aircraft, their airfields and warships that could interfere with the invasion of Okinawa (Operation Iceberg) that was scheduled for 1 April. On 24 March, the ship joined Missouri and New Jersey as they bombarded targets in southeastern Okinawa to deceive the Japanese about the location of the intended landing beaches, which were actually on the western coast. Five days later, a crewman aboard Missouri was wounded by a 20 mm shell from Wisconsin as a Japanese aircraft flew between the ships at low level.

Wisconsin and Missouri were transferred to TG 58.4 afterwards and they resumed their primary duty of protecting the aircraft carriers. The ships returned to Ulithi on 14 May where they replenished their supplies and ammunition before setting off for Okinawa again on 24 May. Halsey relieved Spruance on 28 May and the units switched designations accordingly. The task group avoided a typhoon that shut down air operations from 4 to 7 June. The following day the carriers' aircraft attacked targets on Kyūshū, southernmost of the Japanese Home Islands. One of Wisconsin's floatplanes rescued a pilot from the carrier Shangri-La that day. TF 38 headed to Leyte, Philippines, on 11 June and arrived there two days later. The battleship received repairs over the following three weeks while restocking ammunition and supplies.

==== Bombardment of Japan ====
Accompanied by her sisters Iowa and Missouri in TG 38.4, Wisconsin departed on 1 July for operations in Japanese home waters and the carriers commenced their attacks 9 days later. On 15 July the three battleships bombarded the blast furnaces and other facilities of the Japan Steel Works as well the coal liquefication plants and coking ovens in Muroran and adjacent Wanishi, Hokkaido, with 860 main-gun shells. While only 170 landed within the boundaries of the plants they demolished half of the coke ovens and all but one of the blast furnaces. Reinforced by the British battleship King George V and the American battleships Alabama and North Carolina, the sisters bombarded industrial facilities in the Hitachi Miro area, northeast of Tokyo with a total of 1,207 16- and 267 14-inch (356 mm) shells. The attack reduced copper output from 40,000 to 1,500 short tons (36,300 to 1,400 t) per month.

Afterward the ships returned to the carrier groups, resuming their tasks of covering them from attack. The Japanese surrendered on 15 August, ending World War II. "Wisconsin, as part of the occupying force, arrived at Tokyo Bay on 5 September, three days after the formal surrender occurred on board the Missouri. During Wisconsin's brief career in World War II, she had steamed 105,831 mi (170,318 km) since commissioning, shot down three enemy planes, claimed assists on four occasions, and fueled her screening destroyers on some 250 occasions."

==== Post World War II (1945–1950) ====
Shifting subsequently to Okinawa, the battleship embarked homeward-bound GIs on 22 September 1945, as part of Operation Magic Carpet staged to bring soldiers, sailors, and marines home from the far-flung battlefronts of the Pacific. Departing Okinawa on 23 September, Wisconsin reached Pearl Harbor on 4 October, remaining there for five days before she pushed on for the West Coast on the last leg of her state-side bound voyage. She reached San Francisco on 15 October.

Heading for the East Coast of the United States soon after the start of the new year, 1946, Wisconsin transited the Panama Canal from 11 to 13 January and reached Hampton Roads, Virginia, on 18 January. Following a cruise south to Guantánamo Bay, Cuba, the battleship entered the Norfolk Naval Shipyard for overhaul. After repairs and alterations that consumed the summer, Wisconsin sailed for South American waters. Over the weeks that ensued, the battleship visited Valparaíso, Chile, from 1–6 November; Callao, Peru, from 9–13 November; Balboa, Canal Zone, from 16 to 20 November; and La Guaira, Venezuela, from 22 to 26 November, before returning to Norfolk on 2 December 1946. Wisconsin spent nearly all of 1947 as a training ship, taking naval reservists on two-week cruises throughout the year. Those voyages commenced at Bayonne, New Jersey, and saw visits conducted at Guantánamo Bay, Cuba, and the Panama Canal Zone. While underway at sea, the ship would perform various drills and exercises before the cruise would end where it had started, at Bayonne. During June and July 1947, Wisconsin took United States Naval Academy midshipmen on cruises to northern European waters. In January 1948, Wisconsin reported to the Atlantic Reserve Fleet at Norfolk for inactivation. Placed out of commission, in reserve on 1 July, Wisconsin was assigned to the Norfolk group of the Atlantic Reserve Fleet.

=== Korean War (1950–1952) ===
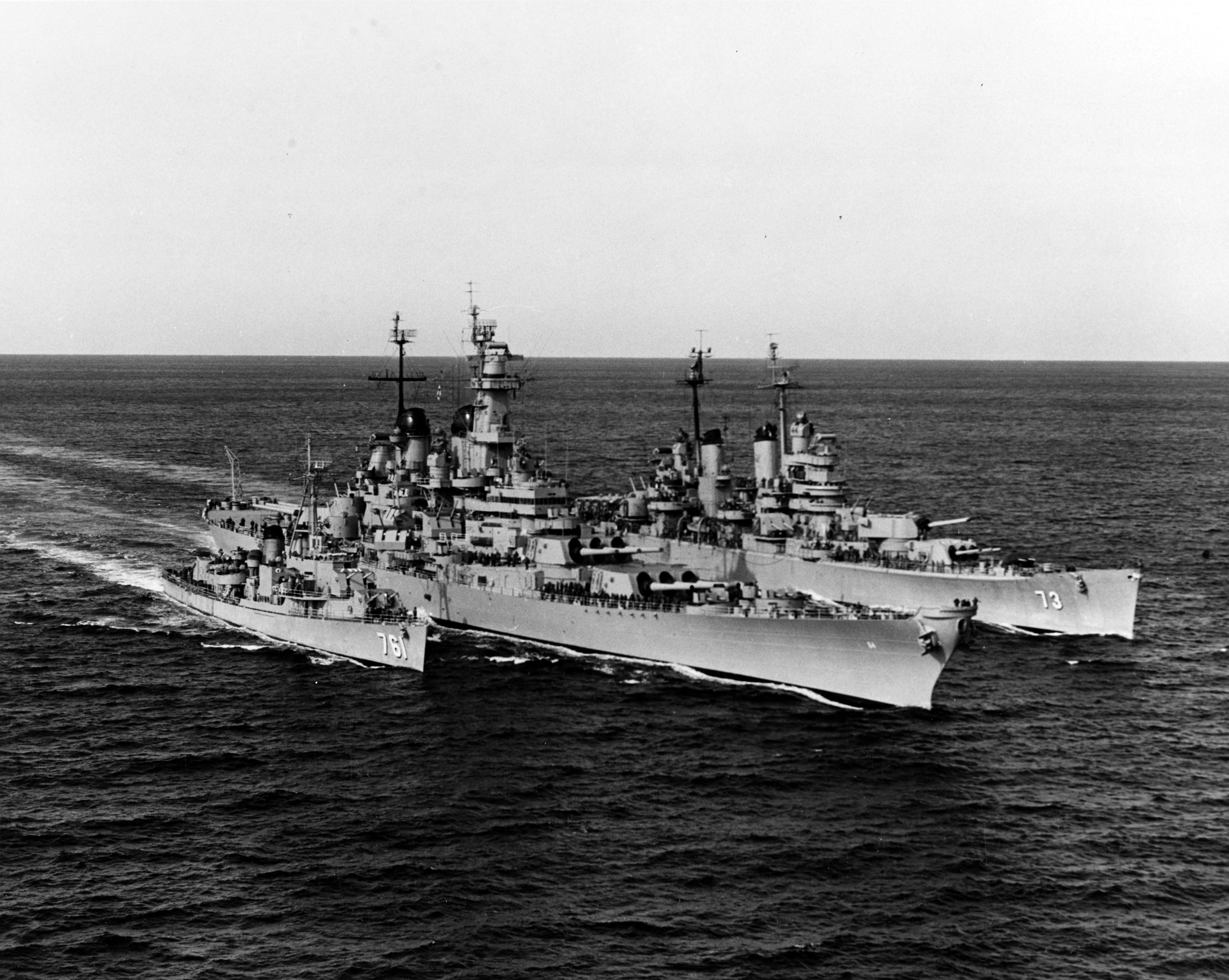
The destroyer Buck, Wisconsin, and the cruiser Saint Paul steaming in close formation during operations off the Korean coast, 1952.

Her sojourn in "mothballs" was rather brief, due to the North Korean invasion of South Korea in late June 1950. Wisconsin was recommissioned on 3 March 1951 with Captain Thomas Burrowes in command. After shakedown training, the revitalized battleship conducted two midshipmen training cruises, taking the officers-to-be to Edinburgh, Scotland; Lisbon, Portugal; Halifax, Nova Scotia; New York City and Guantánamo Bay, Cuba before she returned to Norfolk.

Wisconsin departed Norfolk on 25 October, bound for the Pacific. She transited the Panama Canal on 29 October and reached Yokosuka, Japan on 21 November. There she relieved New Jersey as flagship for Vice Admiral Harold M. Martin, Commander 7th Fleet.

On 26 November, with Martin and Rear Admiral Francis Denebrink, Commander, Service Force Pacific embarked, Wisconsin departed Yokosuka for Korean waters to support the fast carrier operations of TF 77. She left the company of the carrier force on 2 December, and screened by the destroyer Wiltsie, provided gunfire support for the Republic of Korea (ROK) Corps in the Kasong-Kosong area. After disembarking Admiral Denebrink on 3 December at Kangnung, the battleship resumed station on the Korean "bombline", providing gunfire support for the American 1st Marine Division. Wisconsin's shelling accounted for a tank, two gun emplacements, and a building. She continued her gunfire support task for the 1st Marine Division and 1st ROK Corps through 6 December, accounting for enemy bunkers, artillery positions, and troop concentrations. On one occasion during that time, the battleship received a request for call-fire support and provided three star-shells for the 1st ROK Corps, illuminating an enemy attack that was consequently repulsed with a considerable number of enemy casualties.

After being relieved on the gunline by the heavy cruiser Saint Paul on 6 December, Wisconsin briefly retired from gunfire-support duties. She resumed them in the Kasong-Kosong area on 11 December screened by the destroyer Twining. The following day, 12 December, had the helicopter embarkation on Wisconsin of Rear Admiral H. R. Thurber, Commander Battleship Division 2 (BatDiv 2), as part of his inspection trip in the Far East.

Wisconsin continued her naval gunfire-support duties on the bombline, shelling enemy bunkers, command posts, artillery positions, and trench systems through 14 December. She departed the "bombline" on that day to render special gunfire support duties in the Kojo area shelling coastal targets in support of United Nations (UN) troops ashore. That same day, Wisconsin returned to the Kasong-Kosong area. On 15 December, she disembarked Admiral Thurber by helicopter. The next day, Wisconsin departed Korean waters, heading for Sasebo to rearm.

Returning to the combat zone on 17 December, Wisconsin embarked United States Senator Homer Ferguson of Michigan on 18 December. That day, the battleship supported the 11th ROK invasion with night illumination fire that enabled the ROK troops to repulse a North Korean assault with heavy enemy casualties. Departing the "bombline" on 19 December, the battleship transferred Ferguson by helicopter to the carrier Valley Forge.

On 20 December, Wisconsin participated in a coordinated air-surface bombardment of Wonsan to neutralize selected targets in its area. The ship shifted its bombardment station to the western end of Wonsan harbor, hitting boats and small craft in the inner swept channel with her 5-inch (127 mm) guns during the afternoon and helping forestall attempts to assault the friendly-held islands nearby. Wisconsin then made an antiboat sweep to the north, firing her 5-inch batteries on suspected boat concentrations. She then provided gunfire support to UN troops operating at the bombline until 22 December, when she rejoined the carrier task force.

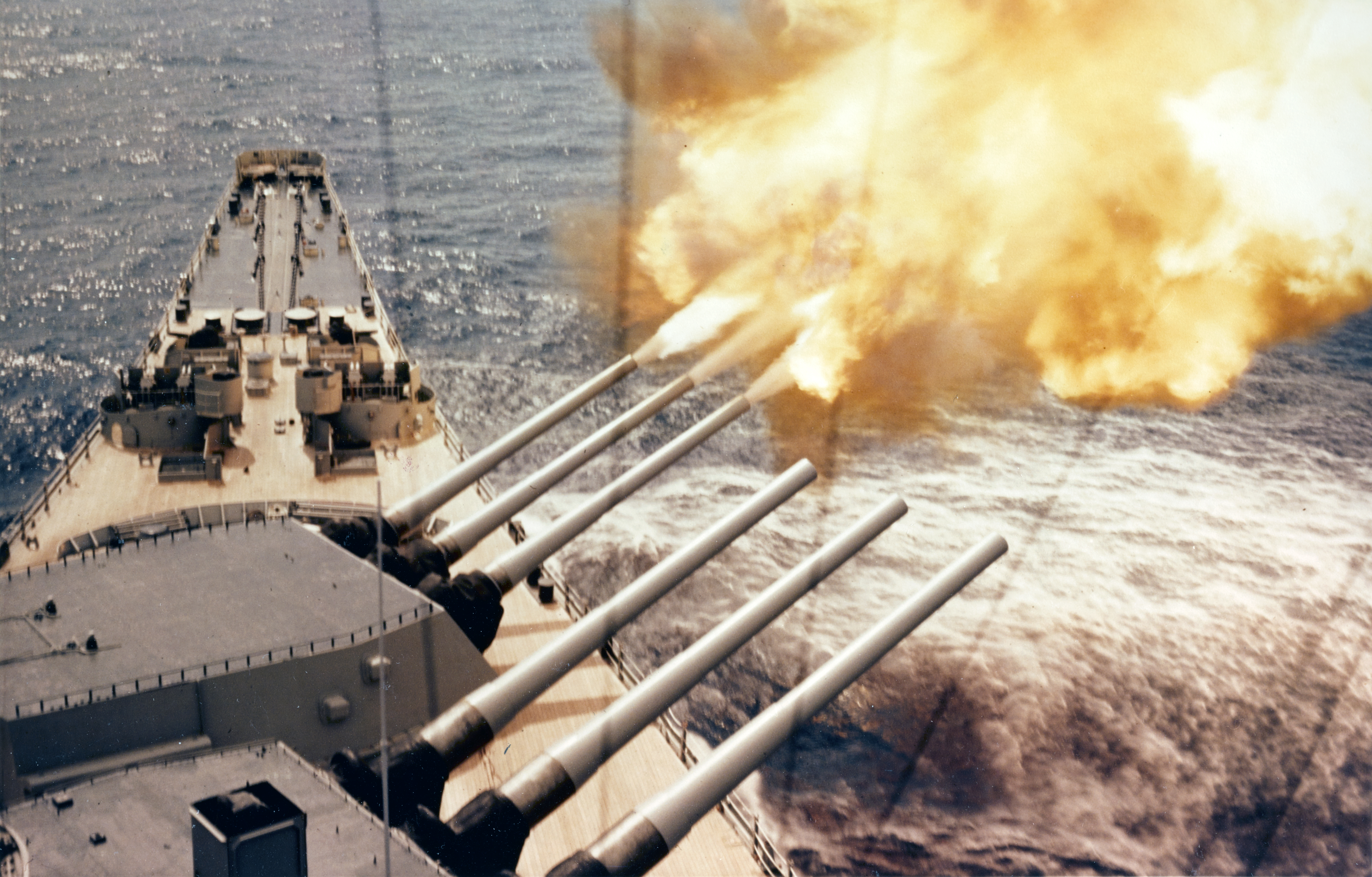
Wisconsin shelling North Korean targets during the Korean War.

On 28 December, Cardinal Francis Spellman, on a Korean tour over the Christmas holidays, helicoptered aboard the ship to celebrate Mass for Catholic crew members. He left as he came, off Pohang. On New Year's Eve day, Wisconsin put into Yokosuka.

Wisconsin departed that port on 8 January 1952 and returned to Korean waters. She reached Pusan the following day and entertained the president of South Korea, Syngman Rhee, and his wife, on 10 January. The couple received full military honors as they came aboard, which Rhee reciprocated by awarding Vice Admiral Martin the ROK Order of the Military Merit.

Wisconsin returned to the bombline on 11 January, and over the ensuing days, delivered heavy gunfire support for the 1st Marine Division and the 1st ROK Corps. As before, her primary targets were command posts, shelters, bunkers, troop concentrations, and mortar positions. As before, she stood ready to deliver call-fire support as needed, shelling enemy troops in the open on 14 January at the request of the ROK 1st Corps.

Rearming once more at Sasebo, she shortly joined TF 77 off the coast of Korea and resumed support at the bombline on 23 January. Three days later, she shifted again to the Kojo region, to participate in a coordinated air and gun strike. That same day, the battleship returned to the bombline and shelled the command post and communications center for the 15th North Korean Division during call-fire missions for the 1st Marine Division.

Returning to Wonsan at the end of January, Wisconsin bombarded enemy guns at Hodo Pando before she was rearmed at Sasebo. The battleship rejoined TF 77 on 2 February, and the next day blasted railway buildings and marshaling yards at Hodo Pando and Kojo before rejoining TF 77. After replenishment at Yokosuka a few days later, she returned to the Kosong area and resumed gunfire support. During that time, she destroyed railway bridges and a small shipyard while conducting call-fire missions on enemy command posts, bunkers, and personnel shelters, making numerous cuts on enemy trench lines in the process.

On 26 February, Wisconsin arrived at Pusan, where Vice Admiral Shon, the ROK chief of naval operations, United States Ambassador J.J. Muccio and Rear Admiral Scott-Montcrief, Royal Navy, Commander, Task Group 95.12 (TG 95.12) visited the battleship. Departing that South Korean port the following day, Wisconsin reached Yokosuka on 2 March. A week later, she shifted to Sasebo to prepare to return to Korean waters.

Wisconsin arrived off Songjin, Korea, on 15 March and concentrated her gunfire on enemy railway transport. Early that morning, she destroyed a communist troop train trapped outside a destroyed tunnel. That afternoon, she received the first direct hit in her history, when one of four shells from a North Korean 155 mm gun battery struck the shield of a starboard 40 mm mount. Although little material damage resulted, three men were injured. Wisconsin subsequently destroyed that battery with a full 16-inch (406 mm) salvo before continuing her mission, famously prompting destroyer Buck to mockingly chastise Wisconsin by signaling "Temper, temper..."

After again supporting 1st Marine Division with her heavy rifles, the battleship returned to Japan on 19 March. Relieved as flagship of the 7th Fleet on 1 April by sister ship Iowa, Wisconsin departed Yokosuka, bound for the United States. En route home, she touched briefly at Guam, where she took part in the successful test of the Navy's largest floating dry dock on 4–5 April, the first ever to accommodate an Iowa-class battleship. She continued her homeward-bound voyage via Pearl Harbor and arrived at Long Beach, California, on 19 April before continuing on for Norfolk.

=== After the Korean War (1952–1981) ===
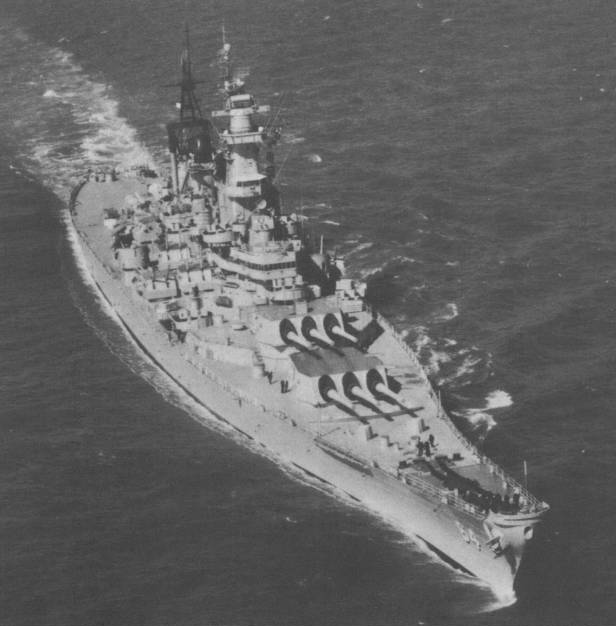
Wisconsin off Norfolk, Virginia, during the 1950s

On 9 June, Wisconsin resumed her role as a training ship, taking midshipmen to Greenock, Scotland; Brest, France; and Guantánamo Bay, before returning to Norfolk. She departed Hampton Roads on 25 August and participated in the NATO exercise Operation Mainbrace, which was held out of Greenock, Scotland. After her return to Norfolk, Wisconsin underwent an overhaul in the naval shipyard there. Wisconsin remained in the Atlantic fleet throughout 1952 and into 1953, training midshipmen and conducting exercises. After a month of routine maintenance Wisconsin departed Norfolk on 9 September 1953, bound for the Far East.

Sailing via the Panama Canal to Japan, Wisconsin relieved New Jersey as 7th Fleet flagship on 12 October. During the months that followed, Wisconsin visited the Japanese ports of Kobe, Sasebo, Yokosuka, Otaru, and Nagasaki. She spent Christmas at Hong Kong and was ultimately relieved of flagship duties on 1 April 1954 and returned to the United States soon thereafter, reaching Norfolk, via Long Beach and the Panama Canal, on 4 May.

Entering the Norfolk Naval Shipyard on 11 June, Wisconsin underwent a brief overhaul and commenced a midshipman training cruise on 12 July. After revisiting Greenock, Brest, and Guantánamo Bay, the ship returned to the Norfolk Naval Shipyard for repairs. Shortly thereafter, Wisconsin participated in Atlantic Fleet exercises as flagship for the commander, Second Fleet. Departing Norfolk in January 1955, Wisconsin took part in Operation Springboard, during which she visited Port-au-Prince, Haiti. Then, upon returning to Norfolk, the battleship conducted another midshipman's cruise that summer, visiting Edinburgh, Copenhagen, Denmark, and Guantánamo Bay before returning to the United States.

Upon completion of a major overhaul at the New York Naval Shipyard, Wisconsin headed south for refresher training in the Caribbean Sea, later taking part in another Springboard exercise. During that cruise, she again visited Port-au-Prince and added Tampico, Mexico, and Cartagena, Colombia, to her list of ports of call. She returned to Norfolk on the last day of March 1955 for local operations. On 18 October, while operating in the East River in New York Harbor, Wisconsin was accidentally grounded, but the ship was freed in about an hour without any serious damage.

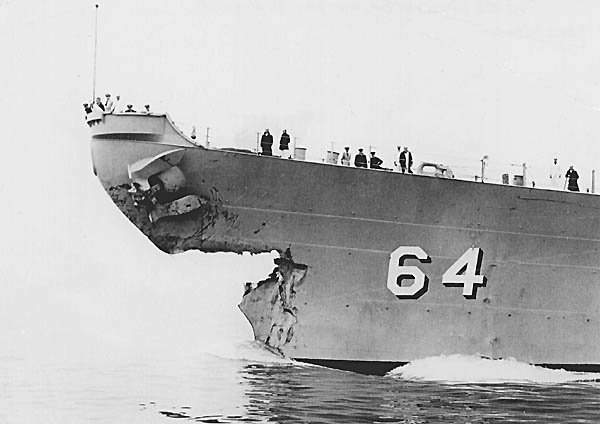
Damage to Wisconsin's bow from the collision with Eaton on 6 May, 1956

In April and the beginning of May 1956, Wisconsin operated in the Virginia Capes area. On 6 May, in heavy fog, the battleship collided with the destroyer Eaton. Wisconsin suffered extensive bow damage, and Eaton was also badly damaged. The battleship was sent to the Norfolk Naval Shipyard for repairs. A novel experiment sped her repairs and enabled the ship to carry out her scheduled midshipman training cruise that summer. A 120-ton, 68 foot (21 m) section of the bow of Wisconsin's incomplete sister ship Kentucky was transported by barge, in one section, from Newport News Shipbuilding and Drydock Corporation of Newport News, Virginia, across Hampton Roads to the Norfolk Naval Shipyard. Repair personnel completed the operation that grafted on the new bow in 16 days. On 28 June 1956, the ship was ready for sea.

Wisconsin resumed her midshipman training on 9 July 1956. That autumn, Wisconsin participated in Atlantic Fleet exercises off the coast of the Carolinas, returning to port on 8 November 1956. Entering the Norfolk Naval Shipyard a week later, the battleship underwent major repairs that were not finished until 2 January 1957.

After local operations off the Virginia capes on 3–4 January 1957 and from 9–11 January, Wisconsin departed Norfolk on 16 January, reporting to the commander, Fleet Training Group, at Naval Station Guantánamo Bay. Wisconsin served as Admiral Henry C. Crommelin's flagship during the ensuing shore bombardment practices and other exercises held off the isle of Culebra, Puerto Rico, from 2–4 February. Sailing for Norfolk upon completion of the training period, the battleship arrived on 7 February and resumed local operations off Norfolk. On 27 March, Wisconsin sailed for the Mediterranean Sea, reaching Gibraltar on 6 April, she pushed on that day to rendezvous with TF 60 in the Aegean Sea before reporting to Turkey for the NATO exercise Red Pivot.

Departing Xeros Bay on 14 April, she arrived at Naples four days later, and conducted exercises in the eastern Mediterranean. In the course of those operational training evolutions, she rescued a pilot and crewman who survived the crash of a plane from the aircraft carrier Forrestal. Wisconsin reached Valencia, Spain, on 10 May, and three days later, entertained prominent civilian and military officials of the city.

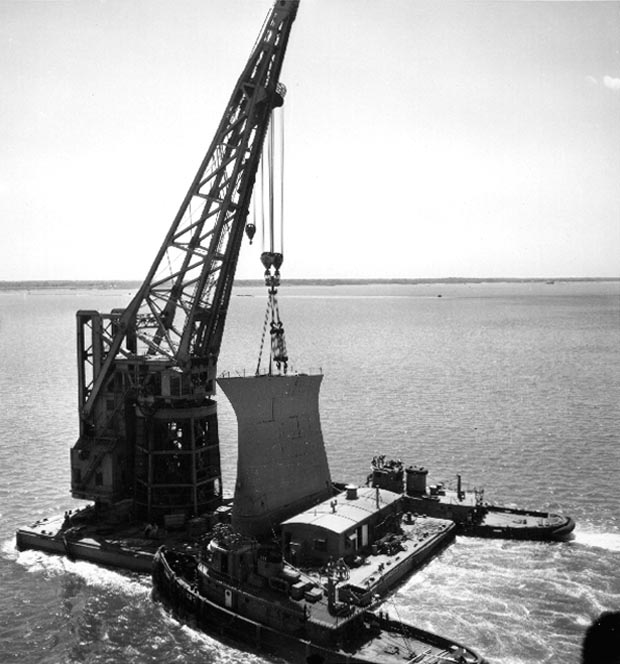
The bow of Wisconsin's sister ship Kentucky was transported in one section, by barge, to repair the damaged battleship.

Departing Valencia on 17 April, Wisconsin reached Norfolk on 27 May. En route, she was called upon to sink a Boeing KC-97F-55-BO Stratofreighter, 51-0258, which had ditched in the Atlantic on 9 May, 550 km (343.8 mi) southeast of the Azores Islands following a double engine failure, and subsequently floated for 10 days.

On 27 May, Rear Admiral Lewis S. Parks relieved Rear Admiral Crommelin as commander, BatDiv 2. Departing Norfolk on 19 June, the battleship, over the ensuing weeks, conducted a midshipman training cruise through the Panama Canal to South American waters, and reached Valparaiso on 3 July. Eight days later, the battleship headed back to the Panama Canal and the Atlantic.

After exercises at Guantánamo Bay and off Culebra, Wisconsin reached Norfolk on 5 August and conducted local operations that lasted into September. She then participated in NATO exercises, which took her across the North Atlantic to the British Isles.

Wisconsin's days as an active fleet unit were numbered, and she prepared to make her last cruise. On 4 November, she departed Norfolk with a large group of prominent guests on board. Reaching New York City on 6 November, the battleship disembarked her guests, and on 8 November, headed for Bayonne, New Jersey, to commence a preinactivation overhaul. She was placed out of commission at Bayonne on 8 March 1958, and joined the United States Navy reserve fleet (better known as the "mothball fleet") there, leaving the Navy without an active battleship for the first time since 1895. Subsequently, taken to the Philadelphia Naval Shipyard, Wisconsin remained there with her sister ship Iowa into the 1980s. While berthed in the Philadelphia Naval Yard, an electrical fire damaged the ship and left her as the Iowa-class battleship in the worst material condition prior to her 1980s reactivation.

=== Reactivation (1986–1990) ===
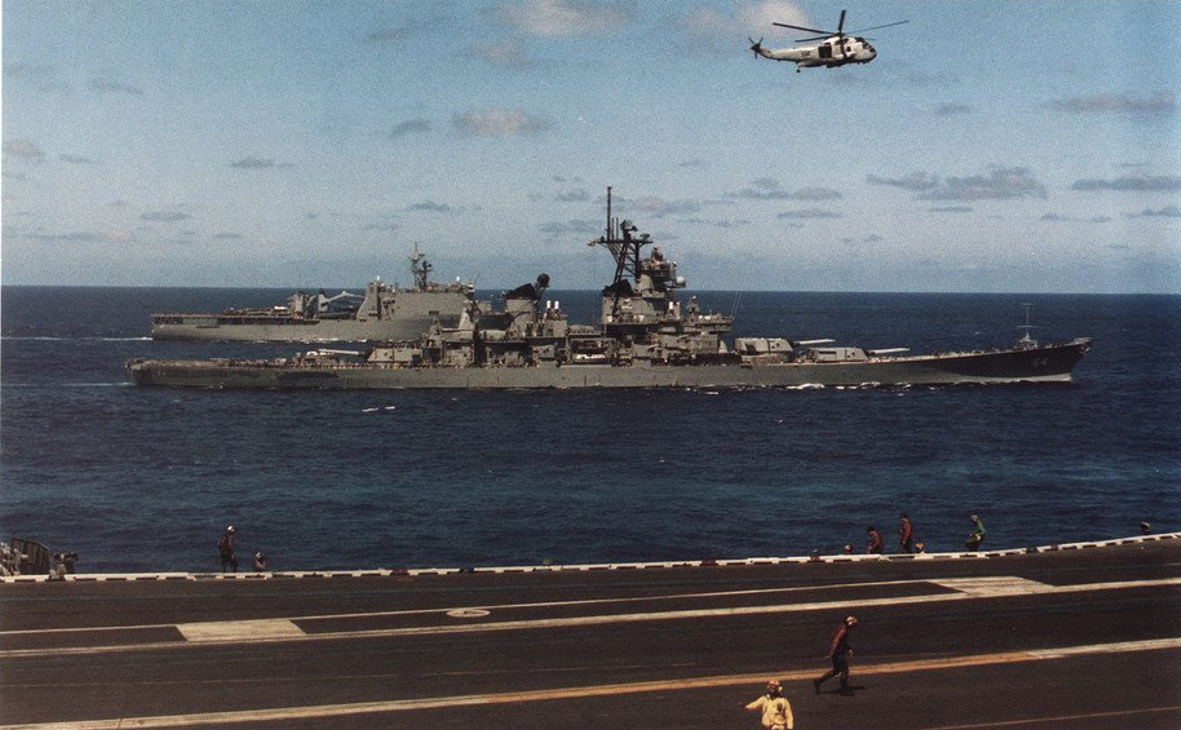
Wisconsin alongside Saratoga around 1990–1991

As part of President Ronald Reagan's Navy Secretary John F. Lehman's effort to create a "600-ship Navy," Wisconsin was reactivated 1 August 1986, a precommissioning unit (PCU) crew established, and the ship moved under tow to the Avondale Shipyard in New Orleans, Louisiana, to commence pre-recommissioning workups. The battleship was then towed from the Avondale Shipyard and arrived at Ingalls Shipbuilding in Pascagoula, Mississippi, on 2 January 1987 to receive weapons system upgrades for her modernization. During the modernization, Wisconsin had all of her remaining 20 mm Oerlikon and 40 mm Bofors antiaircraft guns removed, due to their ineffectiveness against modern jet fighters and enemy antiship missiles; additionally, the two 5 in (127 mm) gun mounts located at midship and in the aft on the port and starboard sides of the battleship were removed.

Over the next several months, the ship was upgraded with the most advanced weaponry available. Among the new weapon systems installed were four MK 141 quad cell launchers for 16 RGM-84 Harpoon antiship missiles, eight armored box launcher mounts for 32 BGM-109 Tomahawk missiles, and four of the United States Navy's Phalanx close-in weapon system 20 mm Gatling guns for defense against enemy antiship missiles and enemy aircraft. Wisconsin also received eight RQ-2 Pioneer unmanned aerial vehicles (UAV), remotely controlled drones that replaced the helicopters previously used to spot for her nine 16 in (406 mm) guns. Also included in her modernization were upgrades to radar and fire control systems for her guns and missiles, and improved electronic warfare capabilities. Armed as such, Wisconsin was formally recommissioned on 22 October 1988 in Pascagoula, under the command of Captain Jerry M. Blesch, USN. Assigned to the United States Atlantic Fleet, she was subsequently homeported at Naval Station Norfolk, Virginia, where she became the centerpiece of her own surface action group (SAG), also referred to as a battleship battle group (BBBG).

Wisconsin spent the first part of 1989 conducting training exercises in the Atlantic Ocean and off the coast of Puerto Rico before returning to the Philadelphia Naval Shipyard for a post-recommissioning shakedown that lasted the rest of the year. In mid-1990, the battleship participated in a fleet exercise.

=== Gulf War (January/February 1991) ===
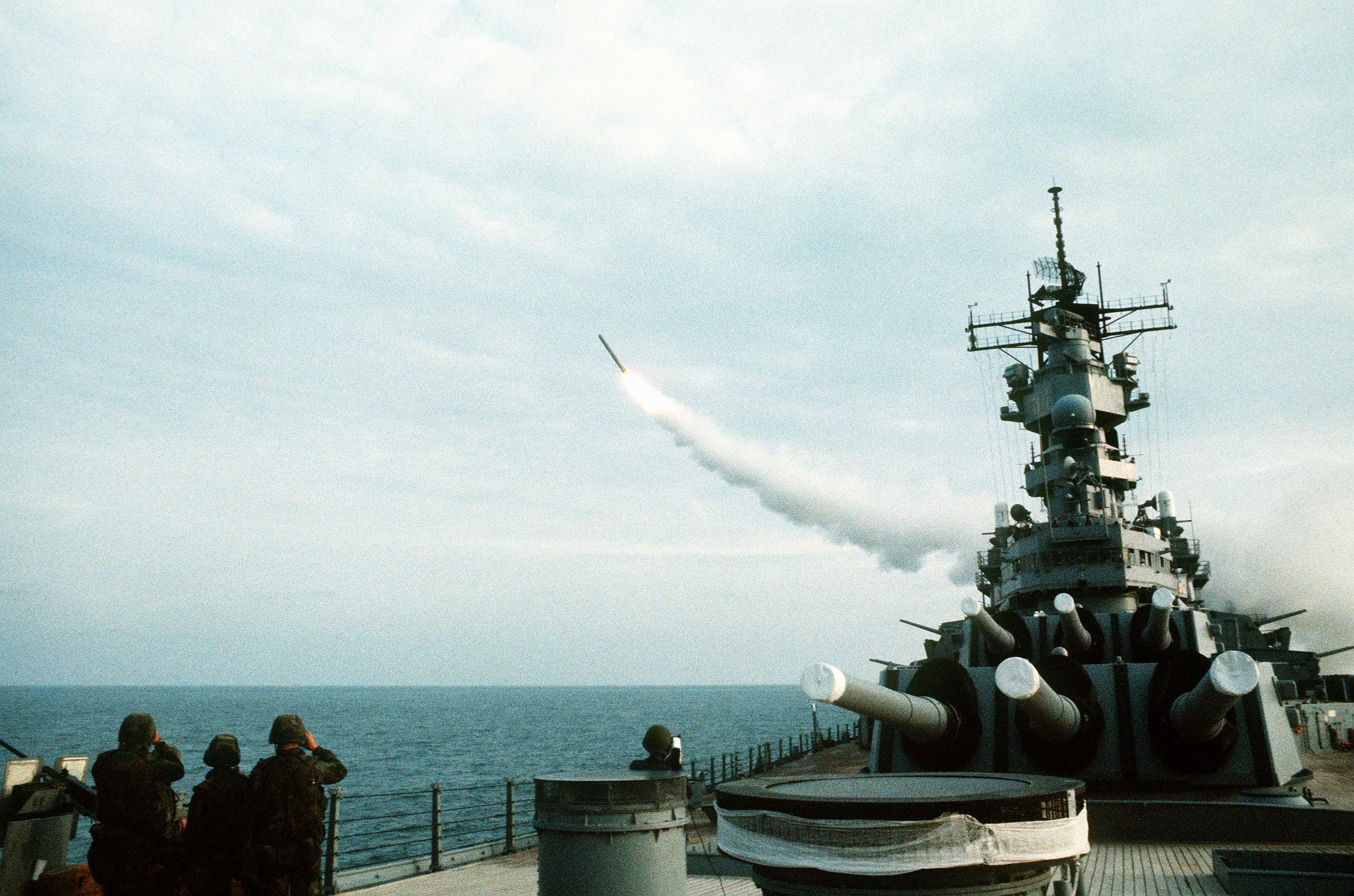
Wisconsin launching a BGM-109 Tomahawk missile during Operation Desert Storm.

On 2 August 1990, Iraq invaded Kuwait. In the middle of the month, President George H. W. Bush, in keeping with the Carter Doctrine, sent the first of several hundred thousand troops, along with a strong force of naval support, to Saudi Arabia and the Persian Gulf area to support a multinational force in a standoff with Iraqi dictator Saddam Hussein. On 7 August, Wisconsin and her battle group were ordered to deploy in defense of Kuwait for Operation Desert Shield, and they arrived in the Persian Gulf on 23 August. On 15 January 1991, Operation Desert Storm commenced operations, and Wisconsin found herself serving alongside her sister Missouri, just as she had done in Korea 40 years previously. Both Wisconsin and Missouri launched Tomahawk missile attacks against Iraq; they were among the first ships to fire cruise missiles during the 1991 Gulf War. Wisconsin served as the Tomahawk Land Attack Missile (TLAM) strike commander for the Persian Gulf, directing the sequence of launches that marked the opening of Operation Desert Storm and firing a total of 24 of her own TLAMs during the first two days of the campaign. Wisconsin also assumed the responsibility of the local antisurface warfare coordinator for the Northern Persian Gulf Surface Action Group.

Wisconsin, escorted by Nicholas, relieved Missouri on 6 February, then answered her first combat call for gunfire support since March 1952. The recently recommissioned battleship sent 11 shells 19 mi (31 km) to destroy an Iraqi artillery battery in southern Kuwait during a mission called in by USMC OV-10 Bronco aircraft. Using an RQ-2 Pioneer UAV as a spotter in combat for the first time, Wisconsin pounded an Iraqi communications compound on 7 February. Her main guns lobbed 24 shells on Iraqi artillery sites, missile facilities, and electronic-warfare sites along the coast. That evening, she targeted naval sites with her 16 in (406 mm) guns, firing 50 rounds, which severely damaged or sank 15 Iraqi boats, and destroyed several piers at the Khawr al-Mufattah marina. In response to calls for fire support from US and coalition forces, Wisconsin's main battery was used again on 9 February, blasting bunkers and artillery sites, and shelling Iraqi troop positions near Khafji after the Iraqis were ousted from the city by Saudi and Qatari armor. On 21 February, one of Wisconsin's UAVs observed several trucks resupplying an Iraqi command post; in response, Wisconsin trained her 16 in (406 mm) guns on the complex, leveling or heavily damaging 10 of the buildings. Wisconsin and Missouri alternated positions on the gun line, using their 16 in (406 mm) guns to destroy enemy targets and soften defenses along the Kuwait coastline for a possible amphibious assault.

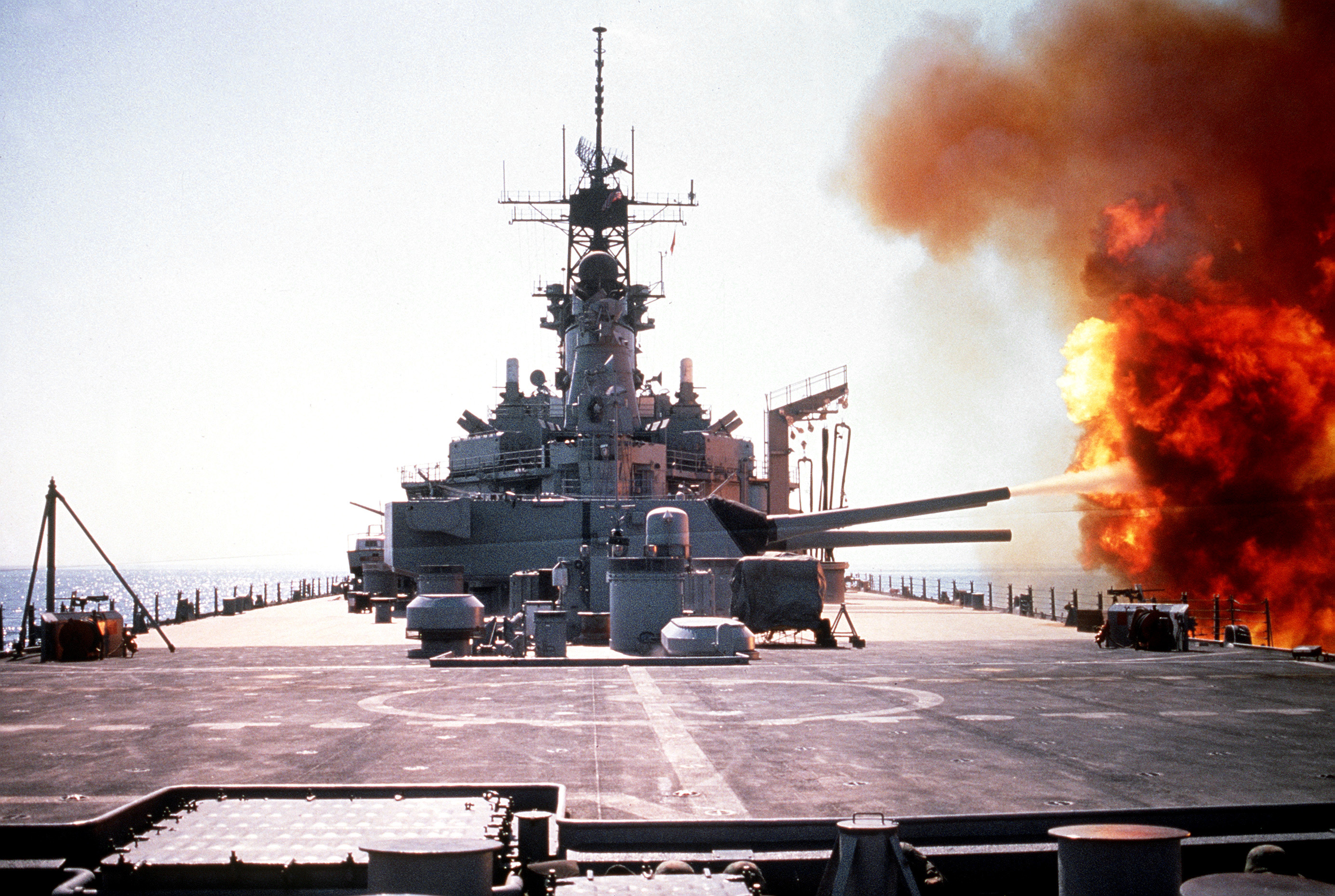
Wisconsin bombarding Iraqi positions during the 1991 Persian Gulf War.

On the night of 23 February, Missouri and Wisconsin turned their big guns on Kuwait's Faylaka Island to support the US-led coalition ground offensive to free Kuwait from the Iraqi occupation forces. The two ships were to conduct a diversionary assault aimed at convincing the Iraqi forces arrayed along the shores of Faylaka Island that coalition forces were preparing to launch an amphibious invasion. As part of this attack, Missouri and Wisconsin were directed to shell known Iraqi defensive positions on the island. Shortly after Missouri completed her shelling of Faylaka Island, Wisconsin, while still over the horizon (and thus out of visual range of the Iraqi forces) launched her RQ-2 Pioneer UAV to spot for her 16 in (406 mm) guns. As Wisconsin's drone approached Faylaka Island, the pilot of the drone was instructed to fly the vehicle low over Iraqi positions so that the soldiers would know that they were once again being targeted by a battleship. Iraqi troops on the ground heard the Pioneer's distinctive buzzing sound, and having witnessed the effects of Missouri's artillery strike on their trench line, the Iraqi troops decided to signal their willingness to surrender by waving makeshift white flags, an action dutifully noted aboard Wisconsin. Amused at this sudden development, the men assigned to the drone's aircrew called Wisconsin's commanding officer, Captain David S. Bill III, and asked, "Sir, they want to surrender, what should I do with them?" This surrender to Wisconsin's Pioneer has since become one of the most remembered moments of the Gulf War; the incident was also the first-ever surrender of enemy troops to an unmanned aircraft controlled by a ship. Wisconsin's drone also carried out a number of reconnaissance missions on occupied Kuwait before the coalition's ground offensive.

The next day, Wisconsin answered two separate call-fire support missions for coalition forces by suppressing Iraqi troops barricaded in two bunkers. After witnessing the effects of Wisconsin's strike against the Iraqi positions, an elated Saudi marine commander commented over the radio, "I wish we had a battleship in our navy."

Both Wisconsin and Missouri delivered more than 1 million pounds of ordnance on Iraqi targets by the time President George H. W. Bush ended hostilities on 28 February. With one last salvo from her big guns, Wisconsin fired the last naval gunfire-support mission of the war, and thus was the final battleship in world history to see action. Wisconsin remained in the Persian Gulf after the cease-fire took effect, and returned home on 28 March 1991. During the eight months Wisconsin spent in the Persian Gulf, she had flown 348 UAV hours, recorded 661 safe helicopter landings, steamed 46,000 nmi (53,000 mi; 85,000 km), fired 319 16 in (406 mm) rounds, 881 5-inch (127 mm) rounds, and 5,200 20 mm Phalanx CIWS rounds, and launched 24 Tomahawk cruise missiles. Since all four remaining battleships were decommissioned and stricken following the Gulf War, this was the last time that United States battleships actively participated in a war.

=== Museum ship (1992–present) ===
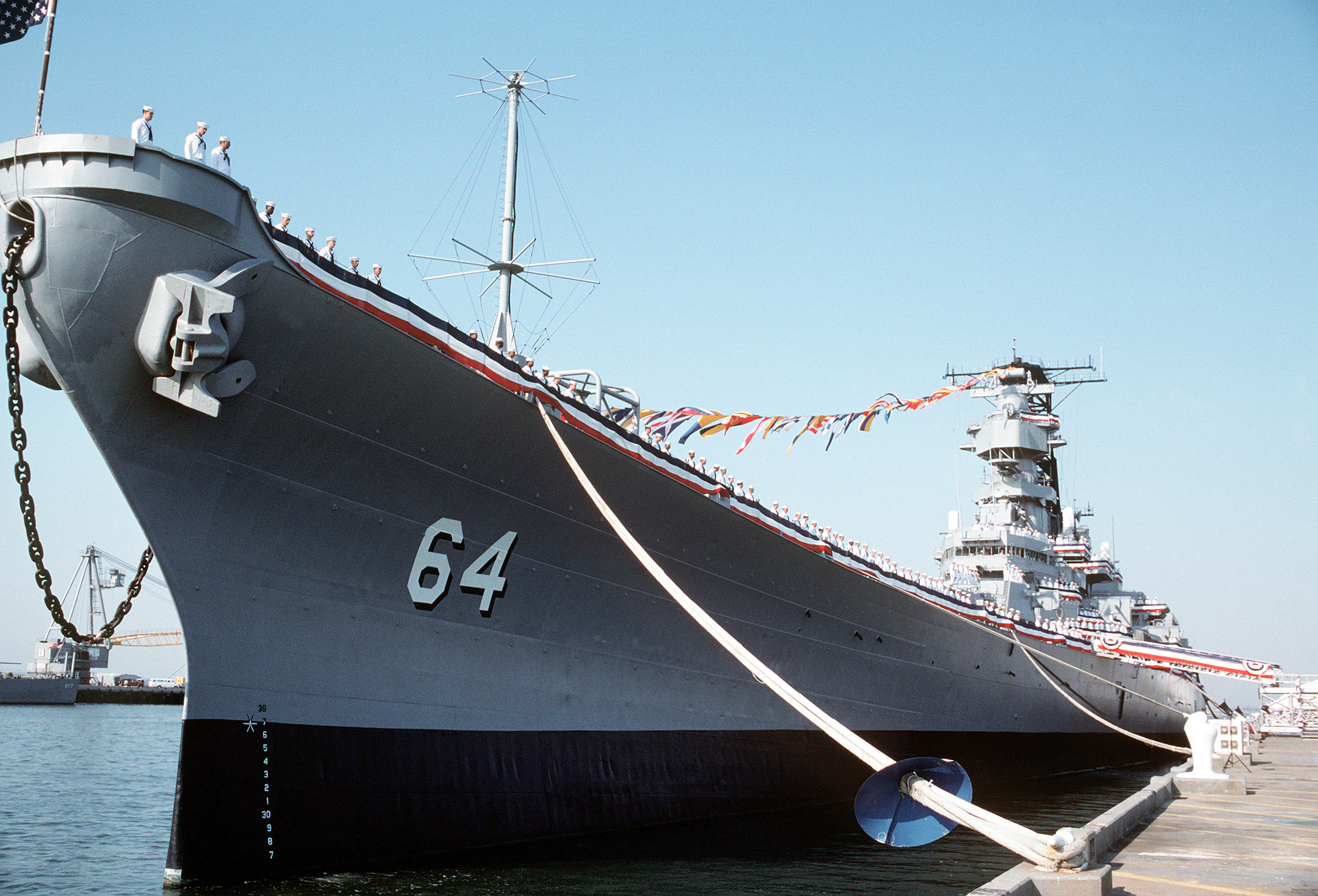
Crewmembers manning the rails aboard Wisconsin during her decommissioning ceremony.

With the collapse of the Soviet Union in the early 1990s and the absence of a perceived threat to the United States came drastic cuts in the defense budget. The high cost of maintaining and operating battleships as part of the United States Navy's active fleet became uneconomical; as a result, Wisconsin was decommissioned on 30 September 1991 after 14 total years of active service, and joined the Reserve Fleet at the Philadelphia Naval Shipyard. She was stricken from the Naval Vessel Register (NVR) on 12 January 1995, then on 15 October 1996, she was moved to the Norfolk Naval Shipyard, and on 12 February 1998, she was restored to the Naval Vessel Register. On 7 December 2000, the battleship was towed from Portsmouth, Virginia, and berthed adjacent to Nauticus, The National Maritime Center in Norfolk. On 16 April 2001 the battleship's weather decks were opened to the public by the Hampton Roads Naval Museum, a U.S. Navy museum charged with Wisconsin's interpretation and public visitation. The ship was still owned by the Navy and was considered part of the mothball fleet.

Wisconsin was named (along with Iowa) as one of two US Navy battleships to be maintained in the reserve fleet in accordance with the National Defense Authorization Act of 1996 as shore-bombardment vessels. However, Wisconsin was then over 60 years old and would have required extensive modernization to return to the fleet since most of her technology dated back to World War II, and the missile and electronic-warfare equipment added to the battleship during her 1988–89 modernization were considered obsolete. In addition, the cost of modernizing the battleships was estimated to be around $500 million for reactivation and $1.5 billion for a full modernization program.

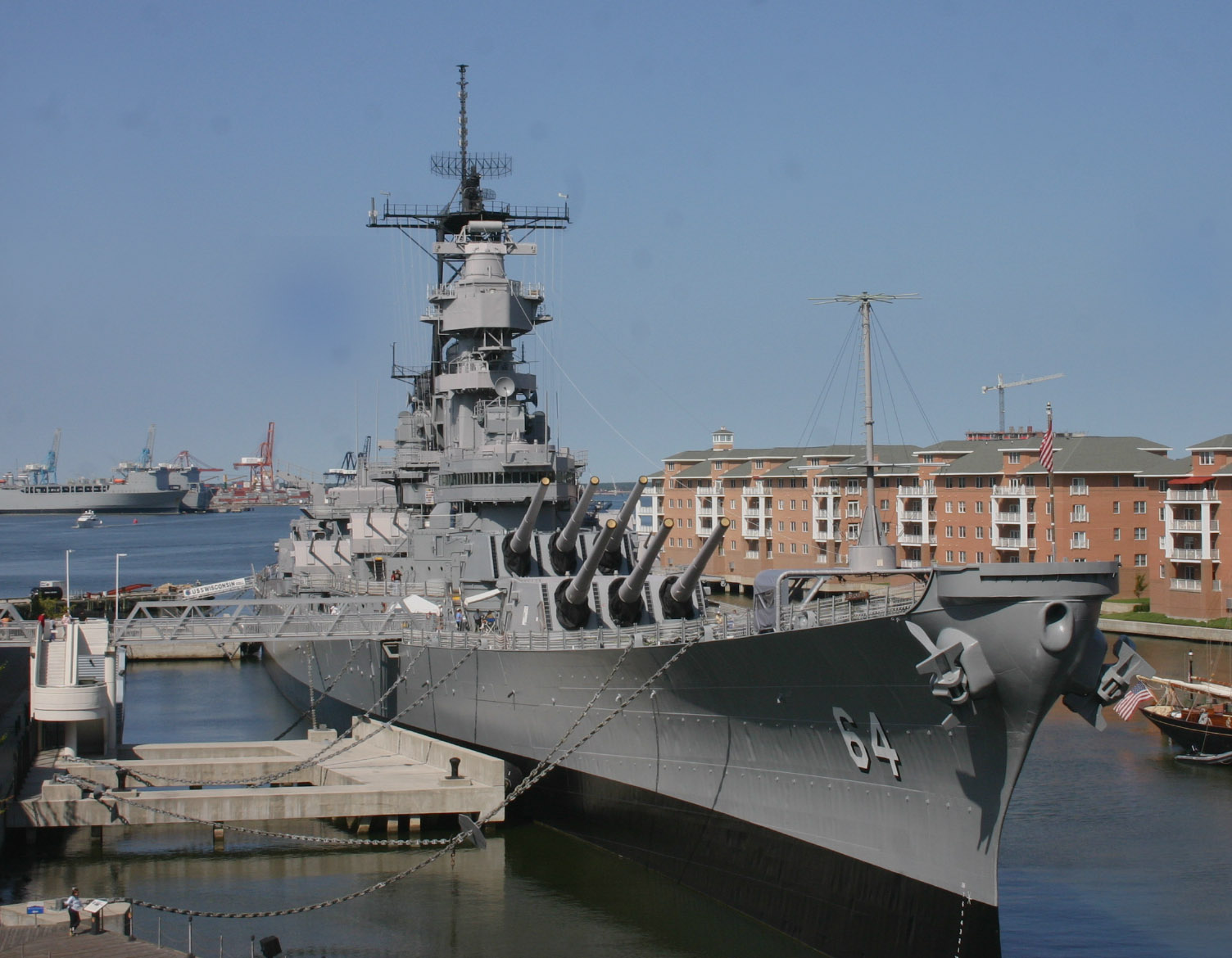
Wisconsin docked in Norfolk, Virginia.

On 17 March 2006, the Secretary of the Navy struck both Iowa and Wisconsin from the Naval Vessel Register, which cleared the way for both ships to be donated for use as museums. However, the U.S. Congress remained "deeply concerned" over the loss of naval surface-gunfire support that the battleships provided, and noted, "...navy efforts to improve upon, much less replace, this capability have been highly problematic." Partially as a consequence, Congress passed Pub. L. 109–163 (text) (PDF), the National Defense Authorization Act 2006, requiring that the battleships be kept and maintained in a state of readiness should they ever be needed again. Congress had ordered that the following measures be implemented to ensure that Wisconsin could be returned to active duty if needed:

1. She must not be altered in any way that would impair her military utility.
2. The battleship must be preserved in her present condition through the continued use of cathodic protection, dehumidification systems, and any other preservation methods as needed.
3. Spare parts and unique equipment, such as the 16 in (406 mm) gun barrels and projectiles, must be preserved in adequate numbers to support Wisconsin, if reactivated.
4. The Navy must prepare plans for the rapid reactivation of Wisconsin should she be returned to the Navy in the event of a national emergency.

These conditions closely mirrored the original three conditions that the National Defense Authorization Act of 1996 laid out for the maintenance of Wisconsin while she was in the mothball fleet.

On 14 December 2009, the US Navy officially transferred Wisconsin to the city of Norfolk, ending the requirement for the ship to be preserved for possible recall to active duty. The US Navy had paid the city of Norfolk $2.8 million between 2000 and 2009 to maintain the ship. A formal ceremony transferring the ship to the city of Norfolk took place on 16 April 2010. Wisconsin was listed on the National Register of Historic Places on 28 March 2012.

Visitors have included the crew of the Royal Navy's HMS Prince of Wales, who also volunteered to help clean and repaint Wisconsin while stationed in Norfolk during the WESTLANT 23 naval aviation trials in 2023.

== Awards ==
Wisconsin earned five battle stars for her World War II service, and one for the Korean War. The ship also received the Combat Action Ribbon and Navy Unit Commendation for actions in the Korean War and Operation Desert Storm in 1991. She also received over a dozen more awards for World War II, the Korean War, and Operations Desert Shield and Desert Storm.

Combat Action Ribbon w/ 1 award star		Navy Unit Commendation
American Campaign Medal	Asiatic-Pacific Campaign Medal w/ 5 battle stars	World War II Victory Medal
Navy Occupation Service Medal	National Defense Service Medal w/ 1 service star	Korean Service Medal w/ 1 battle star
Southwest Asia Service Medal w/ 2 service stars	Navy Sea Service Deployment Ribbon	Philippine Presidential Unit Citation
Korean Presidential Unit Citation	Philippine Liberation Medal w/ 2 service stars	United Nations Korea Medal
Kuwait Liberation Medal (Saudi Arabia)	Kuwait Liberation Medal (Kuwait)	Korean War Service Medal

== See also ==
- List of broadsides of major World War II ships
- List of museum ships
- U.S. Navy museums (and other battleship museums)

== Bibliography ==
- Cressman, Robert J. (30 October 2020). "USS Wisconsin (BB 64) History". Dictionary of American Naval Fighting Ships. United States Navy.
- Draminski, Stefan (2020). The Battleship USS Iowa. Oxford, UK: Osprey Publishing. ISBN 978-1-4728-2729-6.
- Friedman, Norman (1985). U.S. Battleships: An Illustrated Design History. Annapolis, Maryland: Naval Institute Press. ISBN 0-87021-715-1.
- Friedman, Norman (1980). "United States of America". In Chesneau, Roger (ed.). Conway's All the World's Fighting Ships 1922–1946. New York: Mayflower Books. pp. 86–166. ISBN 0-8317-0303-2.
- Garzke, William H. & Dulin, Robert O. (1976). Battleships: United States Battleships in World War II. Annapolis: Naval Institute Press. ISBN 0-87021-099-8.
- Kaplan, Philip (2004). Battleship. London: Aurum Press. ISBN 1-85410-902-2.
- Lane Herder, Brian (2020). The Naval Siege of Japan: War Plan Orange Triumphant. Campaign. Vol. 348. Oxford: Osprey Publishing. ISBN 978-1-47284-036-3.
- Lardas, Mark (2023). South China Sea 1945: Task Force 38's Bold Carrier Rampage in Formosa, Luzon, and Indochina. Air Campaign. Oxford: Osprey Publishing. ISBN 978-1-47285-311-0.
- Macdonald, Rod (2021). Task Force 58: The US Navy's Fast Carrier Strike Force that won the War in the Pacific. Annapolis, Maryland: Naval Institute Press. ISBN 978-1-68247-738-0.
- Polmar, Norman (2001). The Naval Institute Guide to the Ships and Aircraft of the U.S. Fleet. Annapolis, Maryland: Naval Institute Press. ISBN 1-55750-656-6.
- Rohwer, Jürgen (2005). Chronology of the War at Sea, 1939–1945: The Naval History of World War Two (3rd rev. ed.). Annapolis, Maryland: Naval Institute Press. ISBN 1-59114-119-2.
- Sharpe, Richard (1991). Jane's Fighting Ships 1991–92. London: Bulter & Tanner. ISBN 0-7106-0960-4.
- Stillwell, Paul (1996). Battleship Missouri: An Illustrated History. Annapolis, Maryland: Naval Institute Press. ISBN 1-55750-780-5.
- Sumrall, Robert F. (1988). Iowa Class Battleships: Their Design, Weapons, and Equipment. Annapolis, Maryland: Naval Institute Press. ISBN 0-87021-298-2.
