= Hampton Roads Naval Museum =

Naval museum in Norfolk, Virginia

Coordinates: 36°50′51.7″N 76°17′42″W

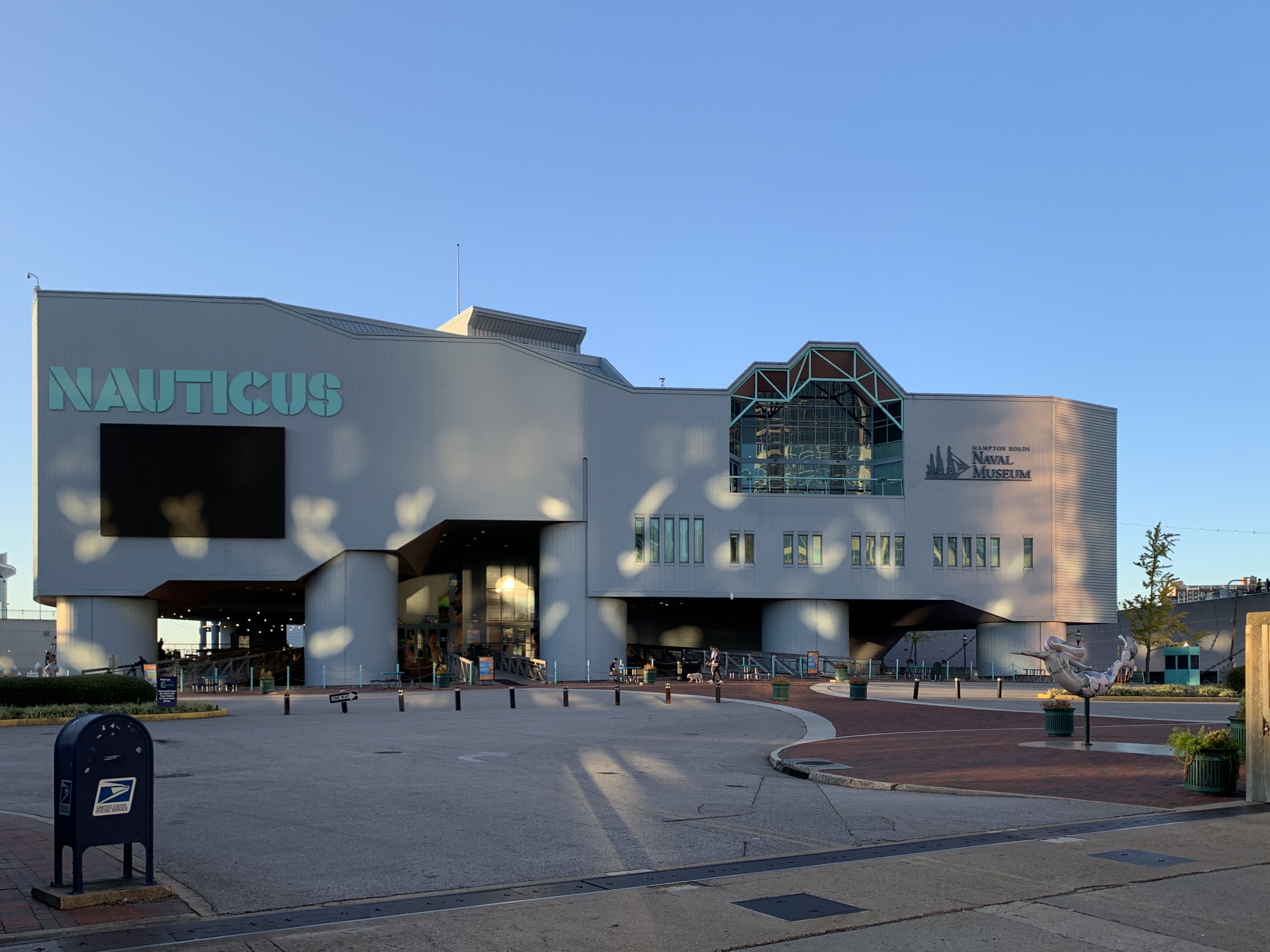
- Established: 1979
- Location: One Waterside Drive, Suite 248; Norfolk, Virginia; U.S.
- Type: U.S. Navy Naval History
- Website: Hampton Roads Naval Museum

The Hampton Roads Naval Museum is one of ten Navy museums that are operated by the Naval History & Heritage Command. It celebrates the long history of the U.S. Navy in the Hampton Roads region of Virginia and is co-located with Nauticus in downtown Norfolk, Virginia.

In December 2008, the Hampton Roads Naval Museum was accredited by the American Alliance of Museums, the gold standard for museum accreditation.

== Collections ==
The museum's permanent exhibits include material on the Battle of the Chesapeake (1781), the American Civil War in Hampton Roads, the Great White Fleet, World War II and the Cold War. Museum holdings are strong in the areas of naval prints, ship models and underwater archaeology. The Hampton Roads Naval Museum is the official repository of the remains of two Civil War shipwrecks: USS Cumberland and CSS Florida.

== History ==
The museum opened on August 31, 1979, in the historic Pennsylvania House. The building, a replica of Independence Hall, is one of the state pavilions remaining from the 1907 Jamestown Exposition, a world's fair. A major effort during the museum's tenure at Pennsylvania House was the 1984 installation of a large exhibit on the Civil War in Hampton Roads.

During the 1980s, the city of Norfolk invited the museum to relocate to a new downtown maritime center. The Navy accepted the offer, and in 1994 the Hampton Roads Naval Museum opened in the Nauticus National Maritime Center. With the move, the museum's exhibit space increased significantly, while also increasing the number of educational programs.

In 2000, the museum undertook management of the battleship USS Wisconsin, which was berthed next to Nauticus that year and opened to the public on April 16, 2001. In December 2009, the Navy donated the battleship to the city of Norfolk, ending the museum's supervision of the ship.

== Museum programs and resources ==
Special temporary exhibits in recent years have included "Animals and the US Navy", "Cuba Libre: The Spanish–American War in the Caribbean" and "Pax Americana: The US Navy in the Era of Violent Peace". The museum also offers guided tours, a lecture series, and educational programs. An active volunteer corps participates in all museum functions. A reference library, archive and photographic collection specializing in regional naval material are open to the public by appointment.

The museum maintains a weekly historical blog post on a variety of naval history topics related to the Hampton Roads, Virginia area. The blog is maintained by their staff historian, and associated content is contributed from the museum's volunteers, educators and staff members.

== See also ==
- List of maritime museums in the United States
- List of museum ships
