= Nauticus =

Maritime-themed science center and museum located in Norfolk, Virginia

Coordinates: 36°50′50.6″N 76°17′40″W

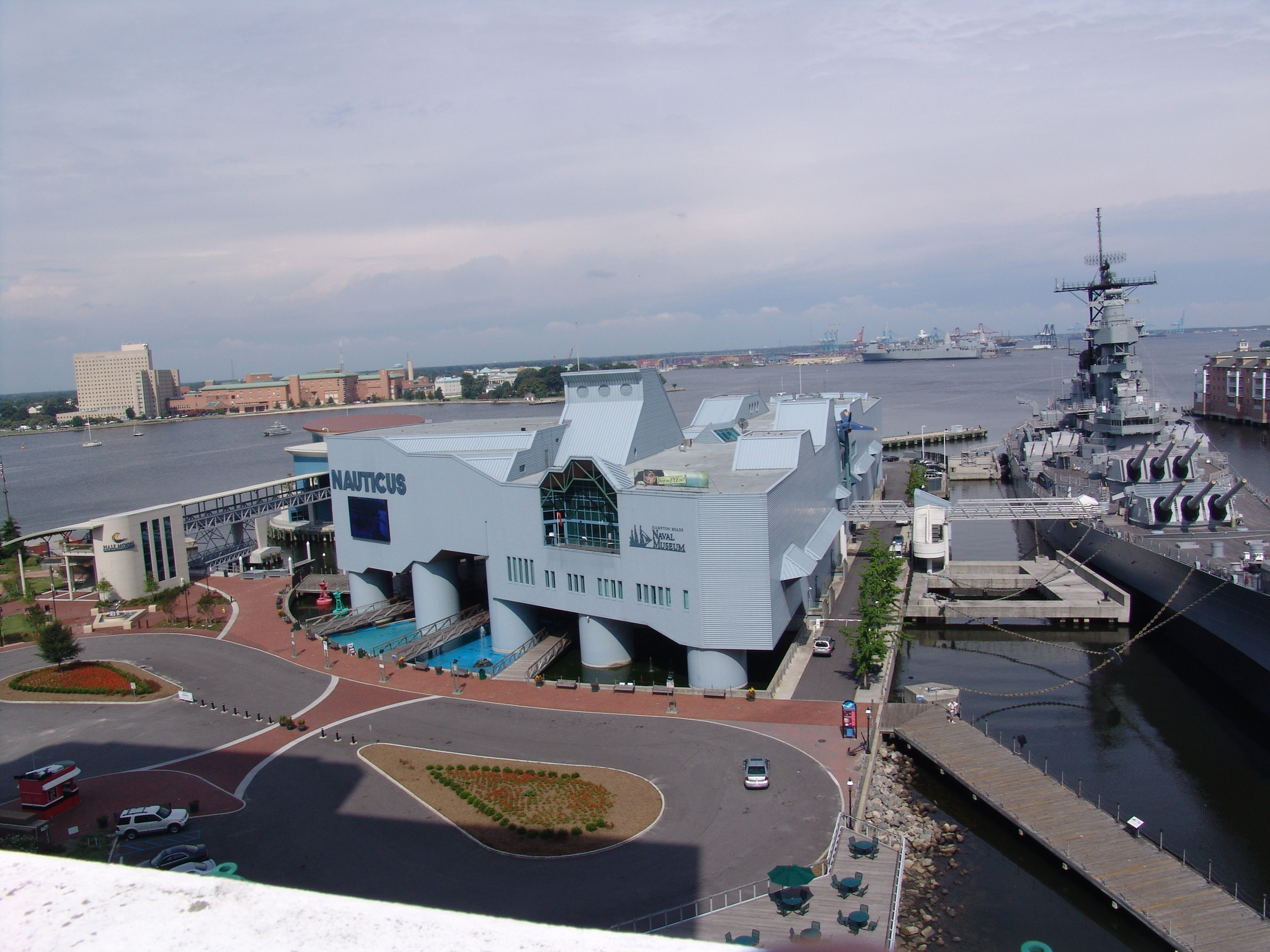
- Established: 1994
- Location: One Waterside Drive; Norfolk, Virginia; United States
- Type: Maritime
- Website: Nauticus

Nauticus is a maritime-themed science center and museum located on the downtown waterfront in Norfolk, Virginia, also known as the National Maritime Center.

== History ==
Nauticus was incorporated under the National Maritime Center Authority in February 1988. The following month, Rear Admiral Jackson Knowles Parker, retired commander of Norfolk Naval Base, became the founding executive director.

Construction began at the former site of Norfolk's Banana Pier on the downtown Norfolk waterfront in February 1992, and Nauticus opened to the public in June 1994. Other visitor attractions nearby include the Virginia Zoo, Norfolk Scope, and Harbor Park, home to the Norfolk Tides.

== Campus ==
=== Half Moone Cruise and Celebration Center ===
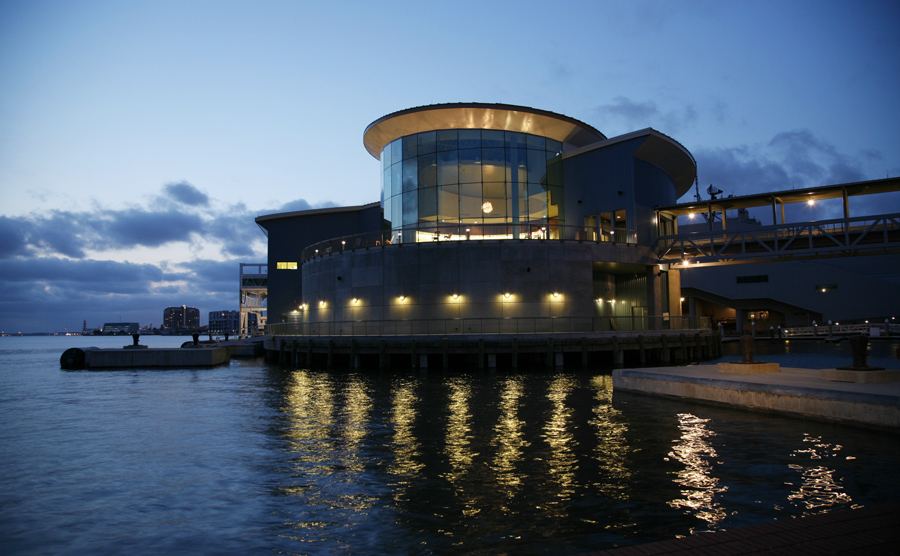
Half Moone Cruise and Celebration Center

The City of Norfolk opened the Half Moone Cruise and Celebration Center located at Nauticus on April 7, 2007.

The 80,000-square-foot (7,400 m^{2}), passenger-friendly facility features views of the Elizabeth River; an enclosed, elevated passenger gangway; a retractable bridge, floor tile in the entrance; a separate lounge and check-in area for cruise line VIP passengers; a security-focused Customs and Border Protection area and an embarkation station. Its first passenger ship, RCI's Empress of the Seas, arrived on April 28, 2007.

The Half Moone also serves as an event venue with approximately 23,000 square feet (2,100 m^{2}) of event spaces, each of which include interpretation and exhibits. Among the areas available for special event rental are the Bermuda Room, which displays artifacts and objects that tell the historic connections between Virginia and Bermuda; the Half Moone Vista, which includes some facts about the original fort; and the Lido and Promenade Decks, which address functions of those traditional decks on board cruise ships.

The name—Half Moone—is taken from the name of the fort that was built on the same site in 1673 in the form of a "half moone." The fort was built to protect Norfolk's burgeoning maritime industry.

Following the Francis Scott Key Bridge collapse in April 2024, Carnival Legend was rerouted to Norfolk, docking at Half Moone.

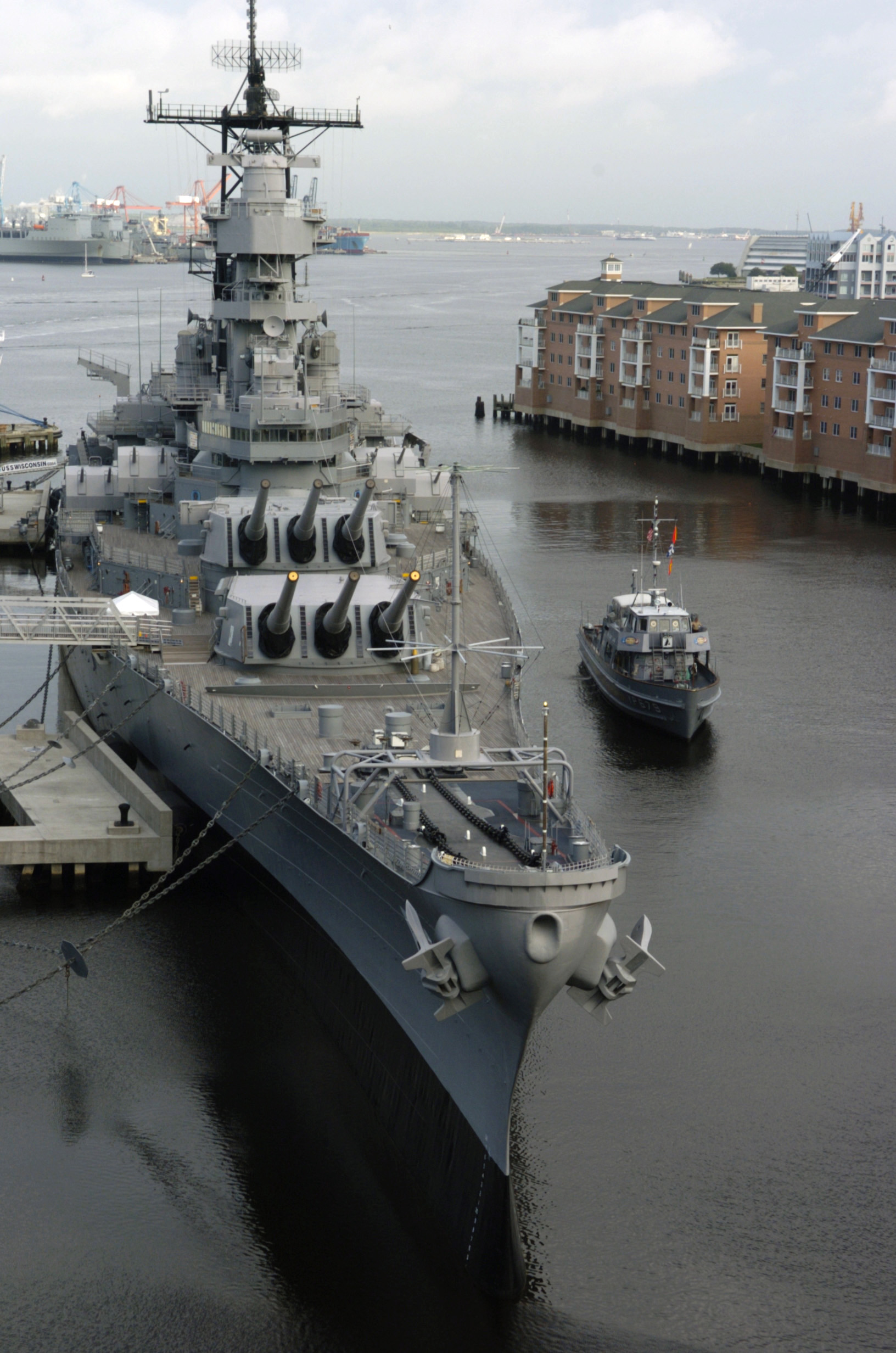
USS Wisconsin, located at Nauticus

=== USS Wisconsin ===
One of the largest battleships ever built arrived at Nauticus on the downtown Norfolk waterfront on December 7, 2000. That date was significant because it marked the 57th anniversary of USS Wisconsin's launching in 1943 – two years to the day after the attack on Pearl Harbor.

USS Wisconsin opened for main deck tours on April 16, 2001. That date marked the 57th anniversary of the ship's commissioning in 1944.

Wisconsin, one of four Iowa-class battleships constructed by the United States Navy, was built from 1941 to 1943 at the Philadelphia Navy Yard and commissioned in 1944. She played a major role in World War II, earning five battle stars for service against Japanese forces. She served during the Korean War, and led the Navy’s surface attack on Iraq during the Persian Gulf War in 1991, firing not only her first but also the campaign's first Tomahawk missile. The ship was decommissioned at Philadelphia and retired to the Naval Inactive Reserve Fleet in Portsmouth, Virginia, in October 1996.

On April 16, 2010, exactly 66 years from the day she was commissioned at Philadelphia Naval Shipyard, the United States Navy ceremoniously transferred ownership of the vessel to the city of Norfolk, Virginia. Vice Admiral David Architzel joined Mayor Paul Fraim, other city and military leaders, and former crew members on deck to conduct the ceremony. Architzel presented the long glass to Norfolk Mayor Paul Fraim signifying that the Mayor now has the watch.

By the end of November 2009, more than 2,495,296 visitors have walked the teak decks of Wisconsin. These visitors have come from all fifty U.S. states and from many other nations around the world to experience the battleship.

=== Sail Nauticus ===
Sail Nauticus is a 501(c)3 nonprofit organization created by the Nauticus Foundation in 2013. Sail Nauticus is a community sailing center using Harbor 20 sailboats, with both adult and youth programs. Its cornerstone program is the Sail Nauticus Academy, an after-school program in partnership with Norfolk Public Schools that teaches middle school students sailing and maritime sciences from a STEM perspective. It also has a Summer Camp.

=== Victory Rover ===
Nauticus offers the Victory Rover Naval Base Cruises, a small fleet of boats taking people around the water to see Naval Station Norfolk and the Port of Virginia. They also offer whale watching, dolphin watching, sailing cruises, and a bus tour of the naval base.

== Exhibits ==
The museum features hands-on exhibits, interactive theaters, aquaria, digital high-definition films and an extensive variety of educational programs. Nauticus has a high-definition large screen theater, named The Broke Theater, and shows several nature-and nautical-related films on a rotating basis.

On the third floor, Nauticus opened a new exhibit in May 2023 called Norfolk in Time. It is designed to "weaving stories of history, culture, science, technology and industry to showcase Norfolk’s unique resiliency in the face of continual challenge and change." Also on the third floor, Nauticus has an exhibit that opened in June 2023 called Aquaticus, which is aimed at younger visitors. Aquaticus includes a large play place with a slide. The Nautical Neighborhood Aquarium is also located on the third floor.

The second floor of Nauticus houses the Hampton Roads Naval Museum and the entrance to the battleship Wisconsin.

== See also ==
- Downtown Norfolk, Virginia
