= Hoosac School =

Coordinates: 42.857131°N 73.344051°W

Location
- 14 Pine Valley Road; Hoosick, New York 12089; United States

Information
- School type: Private
- Established: 1889
- Headmaster: Dean Foster (as of 2011)
- Grades: 8–12
- Enrollment: 240
- Average class size: 7 students
- Campus size: 350 acres (1.4 km^{2})
- Campus type: Rural
- Colours: Episcopal red and purple
- Sports: Hockey and others
- Mascot: Owl
- Team name: The Hoosac Owls
- Newspaper: The Owlet
- Yearbook: The Owl
- Website: www.hoosac.org

Hoosac School is a private co-educational Episcopal boarding school located in Hoosick, New York, United States.

== History ==
Hoosac school was founded in 1889 by Dr. Edward Dudley Tibbits originally for boys. Facilities are located on the Tibbits Estate, which rests on 350 acres (1.4 km^{2}) near the Vermont border. The school was the first in the United States to host a yearly Boar's Head & Yule Log pageant. One of the most prominent members of the Hoosac School was Father Sill, who left the Hoosac School in 1906 to found the Kent School.

== Academics ==
The size of the student body averages about 200 students a year. The students are taught in forms, two through six, roughly equivalent to grades 8 through 12, as well as postgraduate grade levels.

The school has one faculty member for every seven students, with class sizes ranging from three to 14 students. All dorms contain separate faculty apartments, allowing the teachers to function as dorm parents to the students in the adjoining dorm. Most teachers have roles in addition to teaching at the school (sports coach, dorm parent, etc.)

In addition to full-day classes, the school has half-day Wednesday and Saturday classes, which allow the school years to be divided into trimesters instead of semesters. The school offers Advanced Placement courses. Students from non-English speaking countries have the option to take ESL courses.

The student body is governed by a group of prefects who are elected by the administration and the previous prefects.

== Student body ==
Most of the population consists of boarding students. Day students make up a very small percentage of the overall enrollment. Normally, the male to female ratio is just less than 2:1. Hoosac continues to draw a diverse student population, with students currently from 40 countries and 15 U.S. states. Students attend from throughout North America, Europe, Africa, Asia and Australia. ESL classes are offered in all subjects as a result. Despite the school's sectarian status, students belong to a variety of faith backgrounds or are irreligious.

According to Niche.com, Hoosac School is the 2nd most diverse high school in New York.

The students are divided into two houses, the Antonians and the Graftonians.

== Campus life ==
Classes are held six days a week, Monday-Saturday. Breakfast is served in the morning of every school day, including Saturdays, after which students are required to go to a chapel service, before classes.

Students' discipline is administered by a disciplinary committee headed by the dean of students. The majority of offenses result in a student receiving, in order of severity, detention served during what would be their evening free time, being "campused" (i.e. grounded to campus), or placed on "Category", where they are both campused and required to do labor assigned by maintenance and housekeeping.

Term breaks are usually long, to allow foreign students a chance to return home. A Christmas break of three to six weeks is normal. There are smaller breaks at the midpoint of each semester, referred to as "long weekends" which last for four days.

== Facilities ==
Many buildings on campus are mixed-use. Tibbits Hall contains a dormitory, classrooms, and the administrative offices. Wood Hall houses a dorm, the school library and computer lab, and classrooms. The school had an astronomy dome in the science building. That astronomy dome is permanently decommissioned, but a new one has recently been built behind the Sports Complex. The most recent addition is the wood shop, which was built in the winter of 2009.

Every meal on campus takes place in the dining hall. Below the dining hall is the "Squeelery", a rec room with table tennis, foosball, and a small shop selling snacks. Sports facilities include a large multipurpose grassy field area, tennis courts, and the Harry Dickie Sports Complex gymnasium with a full-sized basketball court, fitness center, weight room, and indoor swimming pool. A hardwood basketball court was installed in September 2018. Near the school's entrance is a large pond which has been used in the past for kayaking and canoeing in warmer weather, and is still used for impromptu recreational hockey and ice skating in winter.

== Dormitories ==
Several dormitories are scattered across the campus. A total of ten dorms, ranging in size from housing four to housing 40 students, are in use for either boys or girls. Although the school has a house system, students are not divided by house in the dormitories.

The dormitories on campus are:

For boys: Pitt-Mason Hall (the largest), Tibbits Mansion, Lewisohn House, Lavino House, Dudley Cottage, and Whitcomb Hall.

For girls: Towne Hall, McCullough House, Cannon House, and Wood Hall.

== Sports ==
Every student is required to participate in a sports activity in the afternoons, every trimester.

Men's ice hockey at Hoosac School is the flagship sport for which the school actively recruits. This hockey program won the 2007 New England Prep School Division 2 championship. They also won back-to-back Holt Conference championships during the 2015-16 academic year and 2016-17 academic year. In deference to the steadily increasing female student population, a women's hockey team was formed at the start of the 2016-17 season. At the end of the women's inaugural season, four of five seniors went on to play college hockey. At the end of the school's second season in 2017-18, all seven seniors matriculated to college hockey programs.

The men's and women's basketball teams have also enjoyed recent success. The men's basketball team, composed mostly of underclassmen, won the NEPSAC 2011-12 Class D Championship. Hoosac now competes in AAA basketball, the highest level of competition for prep schools. On July 14, 2022 Hoosac School announced that they have hired former WNBA professional basketball player Julie McBride as women's coach.

Other sports offered include soccer, lacrosse, basketball, golf, volleyball, skiing, cross country, and flag football. During the winter trimester only, the school also has skiing, which involves daily trips to Jiminy Peak. A private ski slope with a tow rope is open to the entire student body on weekends. Lifeguard training is also available as a secondary course.

The two school houses participate in annual Olympic-style games to decide which house has bragging rights for the given year. Each team is coached by a group of randomly chosen staff members from the same house.

== Notable alumni ==
- Niven Busch, screenwriter and novelist
- Abbott Lowell Cummings, architectural historian
- Antonio Franklin, hip-hop producer and DJ
- Charles R. Howell, U.S. Representative
- Ephraim R. McLean, organizational theorist
- Rodolphe Meyer de Schauensee, ornithologist
- Burgess Meredith, actor and director
- Thomas Pelly, U.S. Representative
- Robert H. Rice, admiral and recipient of two Navy Crosses
- Horace Seely-Brown Jr., U.S. Representative
- George Verschoor, television director and producer
- Tom Whidden, yachtsman and CEO of North Sails
