= Battleship Memorial Park =

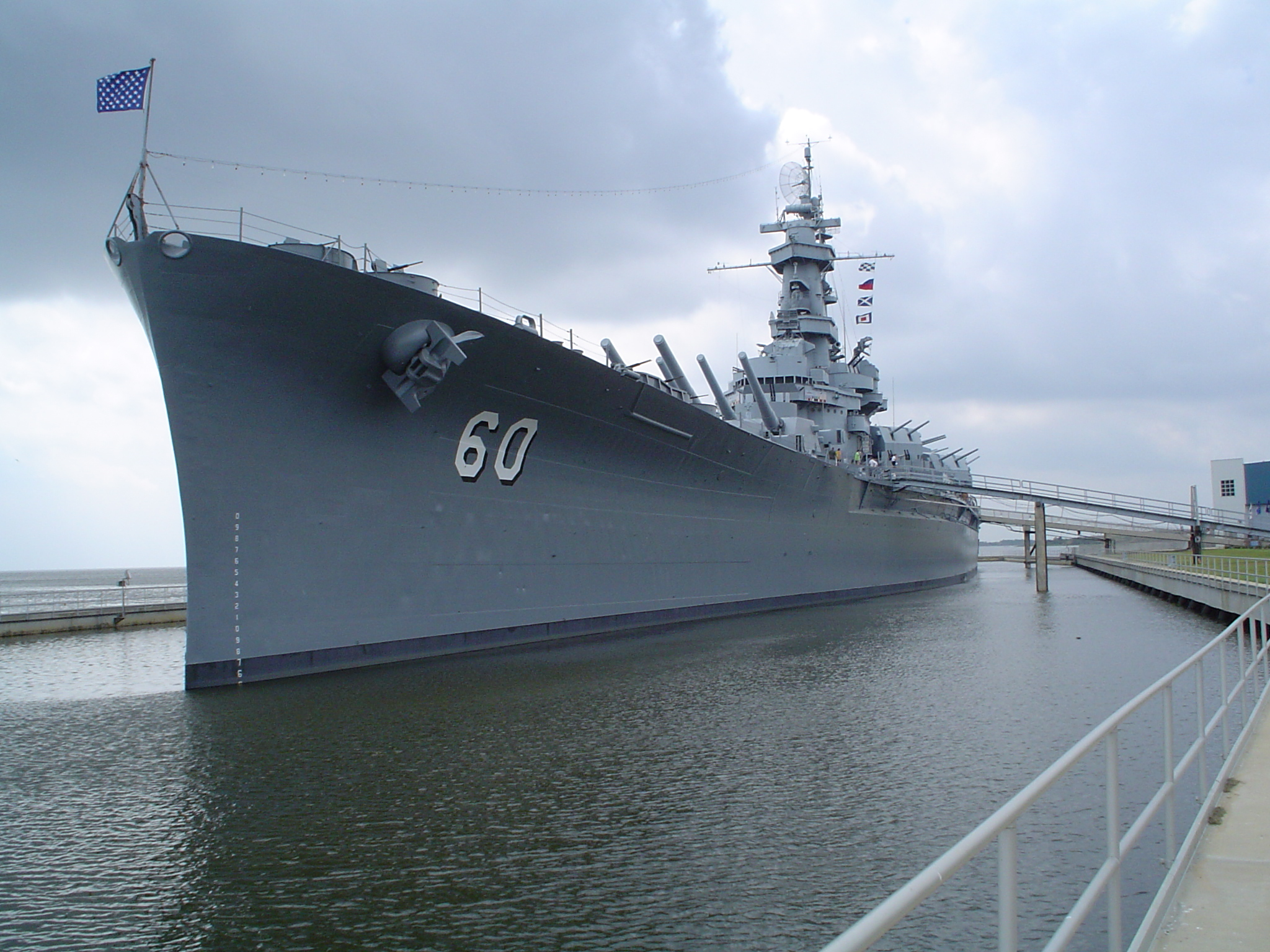
- USS Alabama in Battleship Memorial Park in 2008

- Location within Alabama Location within the United States
- 30.68178°N 88.01479°W
- Location: Mobile, Alabama, United States

History
- Founded: January 9, 1965

Alabama Register of Landmarks and Heritage
- Official name: Battleship Alabama Memorial Park
- Designated: October 28, 1977

U.S. National Historic Landmark
- Official name: USS ALABAMA (battleship)
- Designated: January 14, 1986
- Reference no.: 86000083

U.S. National Historic Landmark
- Official name: USS DRUM (submarine)
- Designated: January 14, 1986
- Reference no.: 86000086

Battleship Memorial Park is a military history park and museum on the western shore of Mobile Bay in Mobile, Alabama. Its notable aircraft and museum ships include the South Dakota-class battleship USS Alabama and Gato-class submarine USS Drum. Alabama and Drum are National Historic Landmarks; the park as a whole was listed on the Alabama Register of Landmarks and Heritage on October 28, 1977.

== History ==
In May 1962, USS Alabama had been ordered scrapped along with her South Dakota-class sister ships, USS South Dakota, USS Indiana, and USS Massachusetts. Citizens of the state of Alabama had formed the "USS Alabama Battleship Commission" to raise funds for the preservation of Alabama as a memorial to the men and women who served in World War II. Alabama's school children raised about $100,000 in nickels and dimes from lunch money and allowances to help the cause. The ship was awarded to the state on June 16, 1964, and was formally turned over on July 7, 1964 in ceremonies at Seattle, Washington. Alabama was then towed to her permanent berth at Mobile, Alabama, arriving in Mobile Bay on September 14, 1964, and opening as a museum ship on January 9, 1965.

Alabama was joined in 1969 by USS Drum, a World War II Gato-class submarine, which was moored behind her until 2001, when the submarine was moved onto land for preservation in a permanent display.

In 2003, a replica of a Confederate submarine that was built in Mobile, CSS H. L. Hunley, was moved to the park.

Hurricane Katrina caused more than $7 million in damage to Battleship Memorial Park on August 29, 2005. It almost completely destroyed the aircraft pavilion. It shifted Alabama at anchorage and gave her an eight-degree list to port. Repairs closed the park until January 9, 2006.

The museum's F-4C was removed from its location atop the entrance sign in February 2023 for restoration.

== Features ==
- The World War II-era battleship USS Alabama (BB-60).
- The World War II era submarine USS Drum (SS-228).
- Bombers and fighter planes ranging from a B-52 from the Vietnam War, a P-51 Mustang flown by the Tuskegee Airmen to an Lockheed A-12 spyplane.
- A PBR (River Patrol Boat) used in the Vietnam War.
- Military equipment ranging from items such as a M51 Skysweeper anti-aircraft gun to a M4 Sherman tank.
- A PGM-11 Redstone short range ballistic missile.
- Korean War Memorial
- Vietnam War Memorial

== Medal of Honor Aircraft Pavilion ==
Up to World War II

- Boeing-Stearman Model 75
- Douglas C-47D Skytrain 4076326
- Grumman Goose II
- North American B-25J Mitchell 20NC44310004
- North American P-51D Mustang 4474216
- Vought OS2U Kingfisher BU0951

Korean War era

- Douglas AD-4N Skyraider
- Grumman F9F-5P Panther 126275
- North America F-86L Sabre 512993
- Piasecki CH-21 515859

Vietnam War era

- Douglas A-4C Skyhawk 147787
- Grumman A-6 Intruder 151626
- McDonnell Douglas F-4C Phantom II 637487
- Mikoyan-Gurevich MiG-17A Red87
- Republic F-105B-IRE Thunderchief 540102
- Vought RF-8A Crusader 145645

Cold War

- Bell VH-1N Huey 158551
- Boeing B-52D Stratofortress 55071
- General Dynamics F-16A (GF) Fighting Falcon
- Grumman F-14A+ Tomcat
- Kaman SH-2F Seasprite
- Lockheed A-12 606938
- McDonnell Douglas F-15A Eagle 75045
- Northrop YF-17 1002 201570
- McDonnell Douglas F/A-18 Hornet 162417
- PGM-11 Redstone SRBM

Coast Guard

- Grumman HU-16E Albatross 2129
- Sikorsky HO-4S
- Sikorsky HH-52A Seaguard 1378

== Events ==
The 2001 USA Cross Country Championships were held at a cross country running course in the park.

Political events have not been allowed at the venue since 2012.

A living history crew drill is held six times a year. WWII reenactors dress in period uniforms and demonstrate life aboard the ship during wartime. Reeanctors share stories, conduct weapon briefings, and demonstrate drills.

== Administration ==
The park is owned by the state of Alabama and is run by an independent government agency, the USS Alabama Battleship Commission. The commission consists of 18 members appointed by the Alabama governor. It has oversight of all operations at the park.

== Gallery ==
Scenes within the park
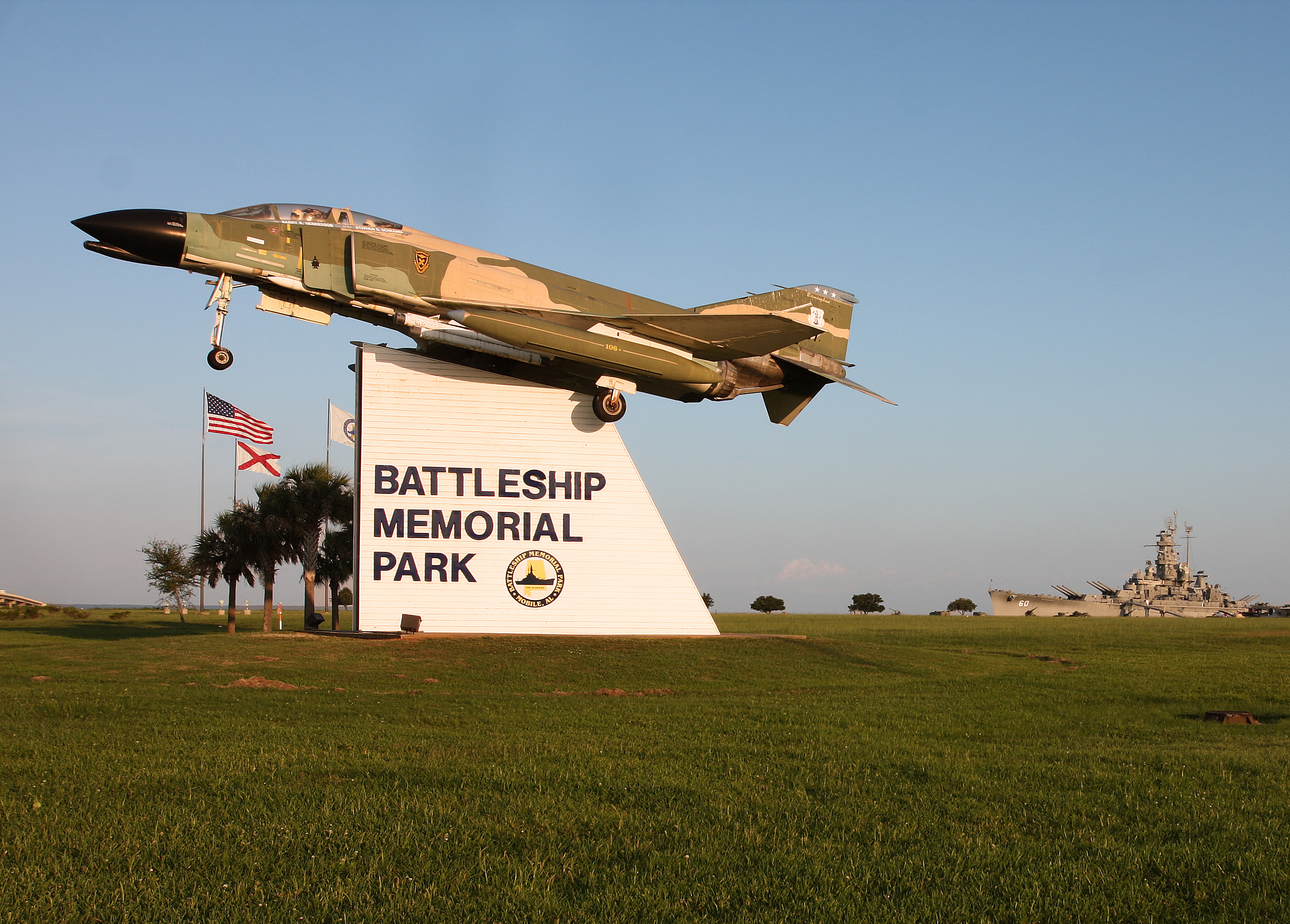
Entrance with F-4 Phantom

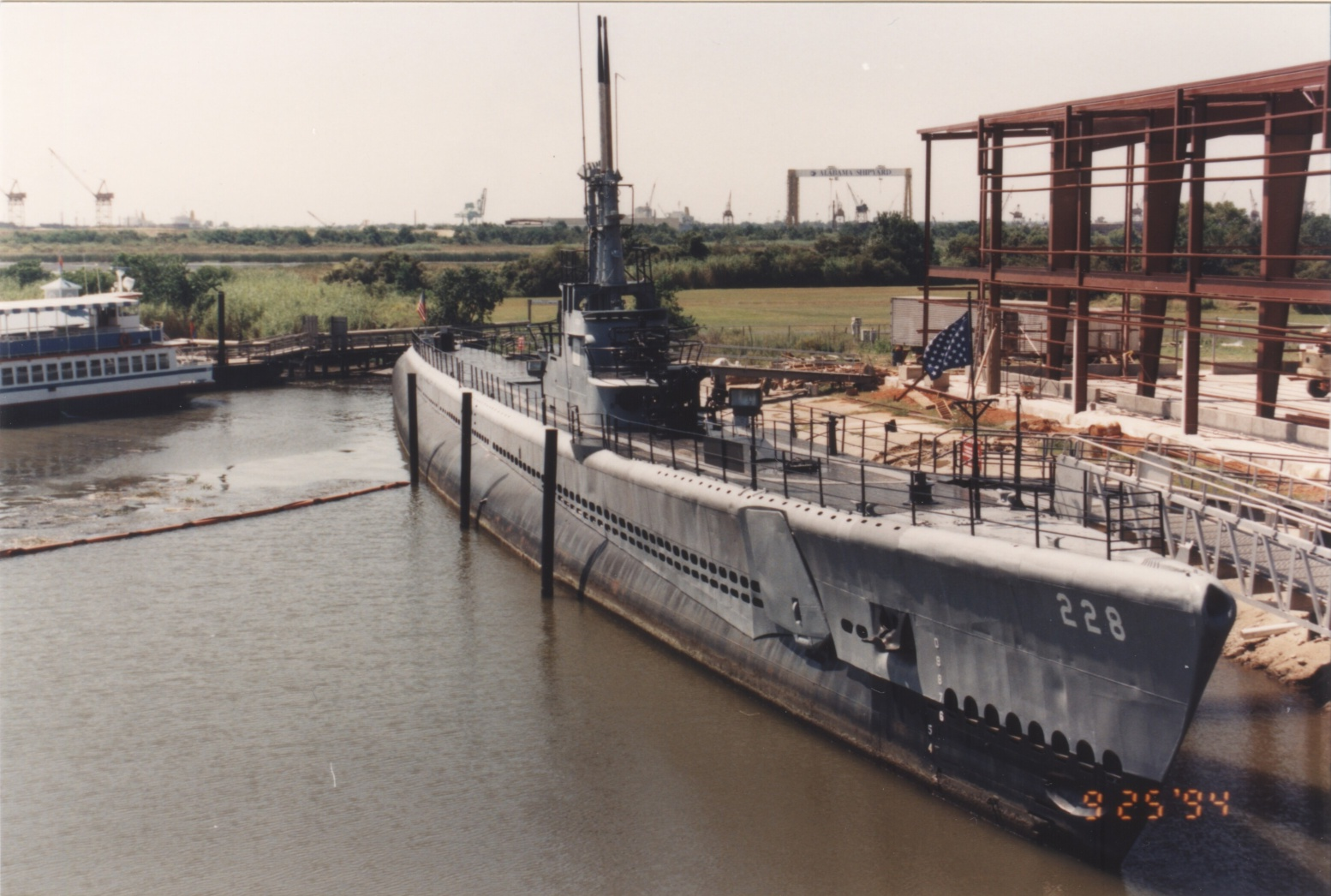
USS Drum moored behind USS Alabama in 1994

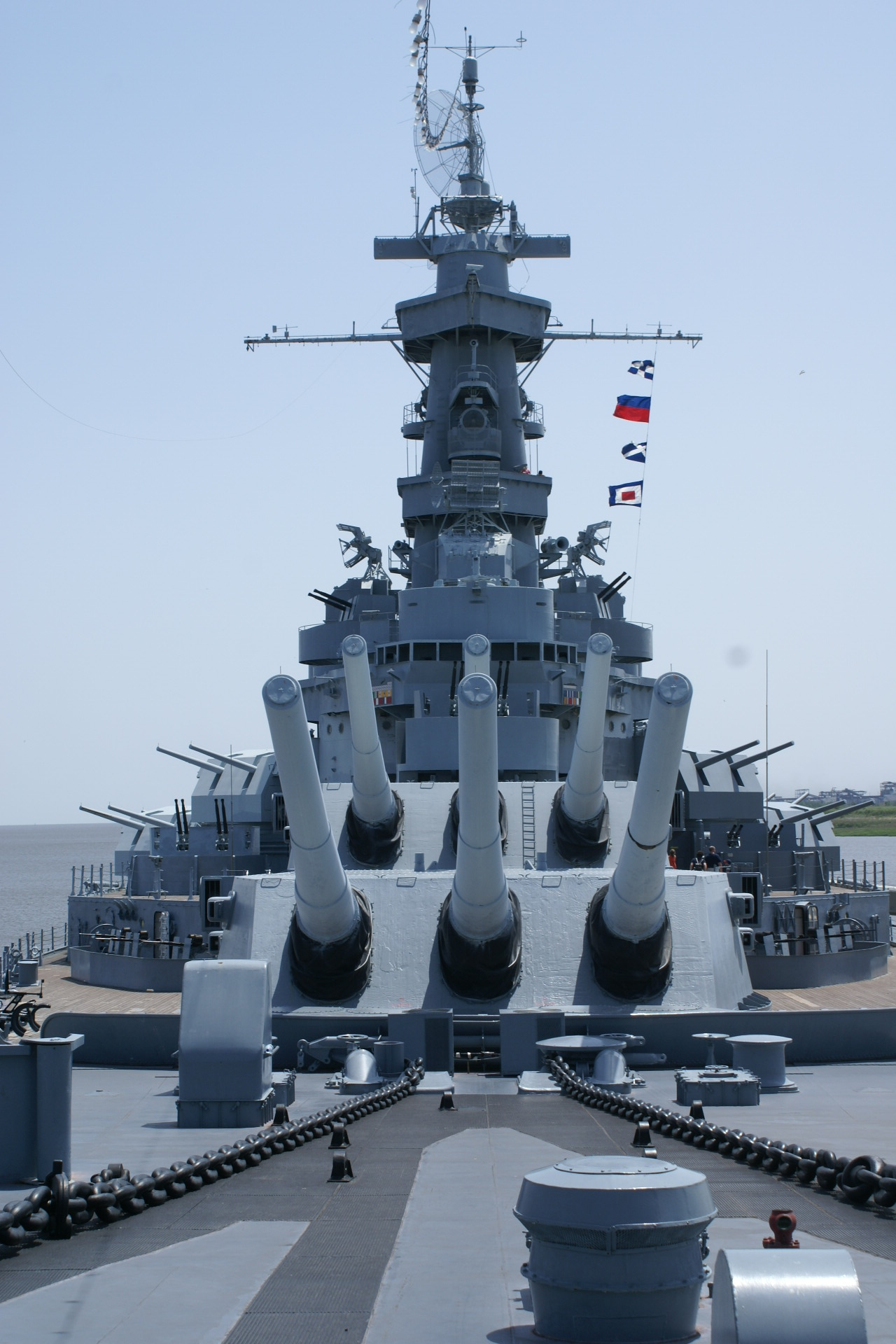
USS Alabama's forward guns and deck in 2008

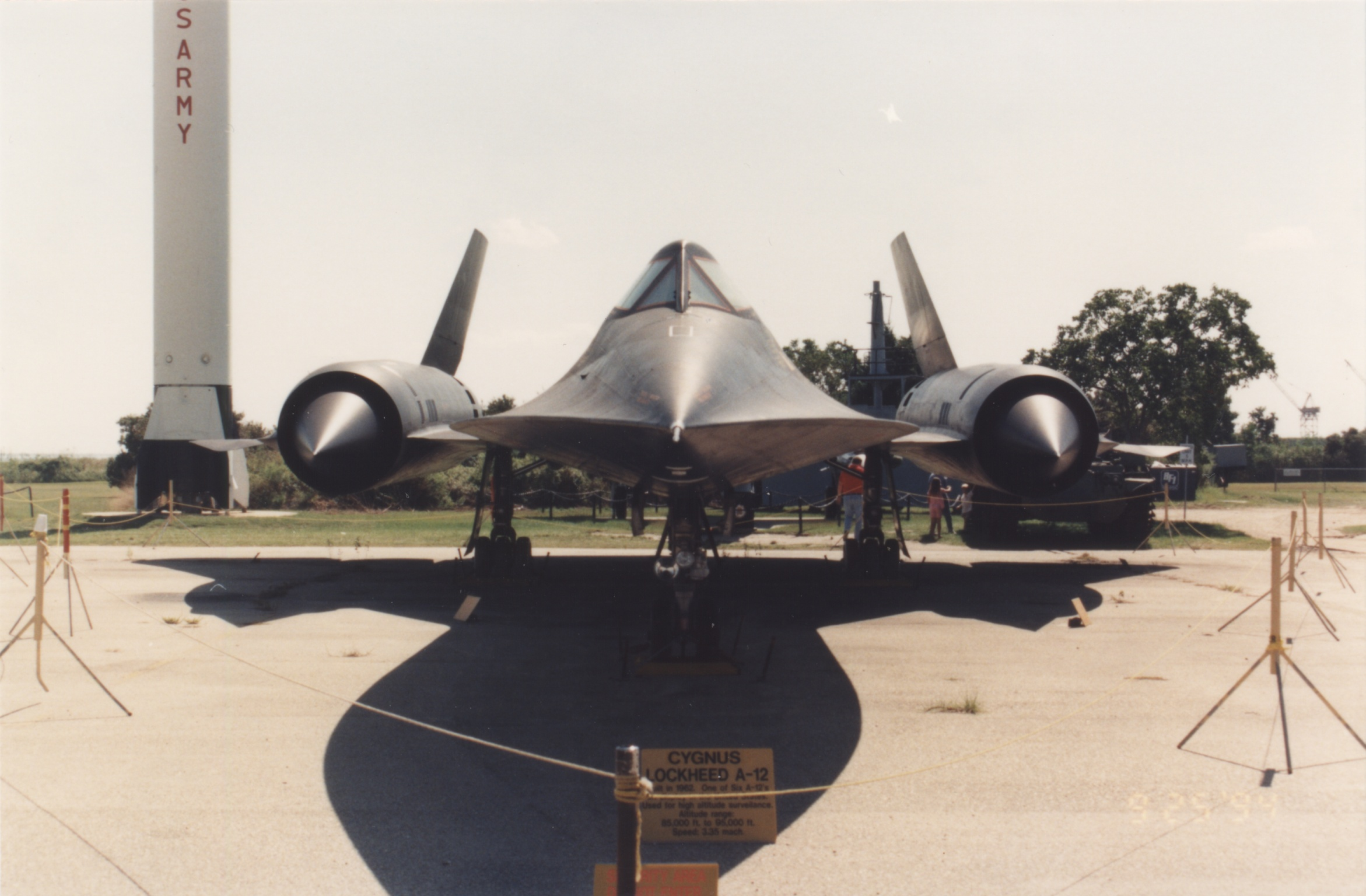
A-12 Oxcart on display in 1994, before construction of the first aircraft pavilion

Type 69-II main battle tank from Iraq

== See also ==
- List of museums in Alabama
- List of maritime museums in the United States
- List of battleships of the United States Navy
