= USS Drum (SS-228) =

Submarine of the United States

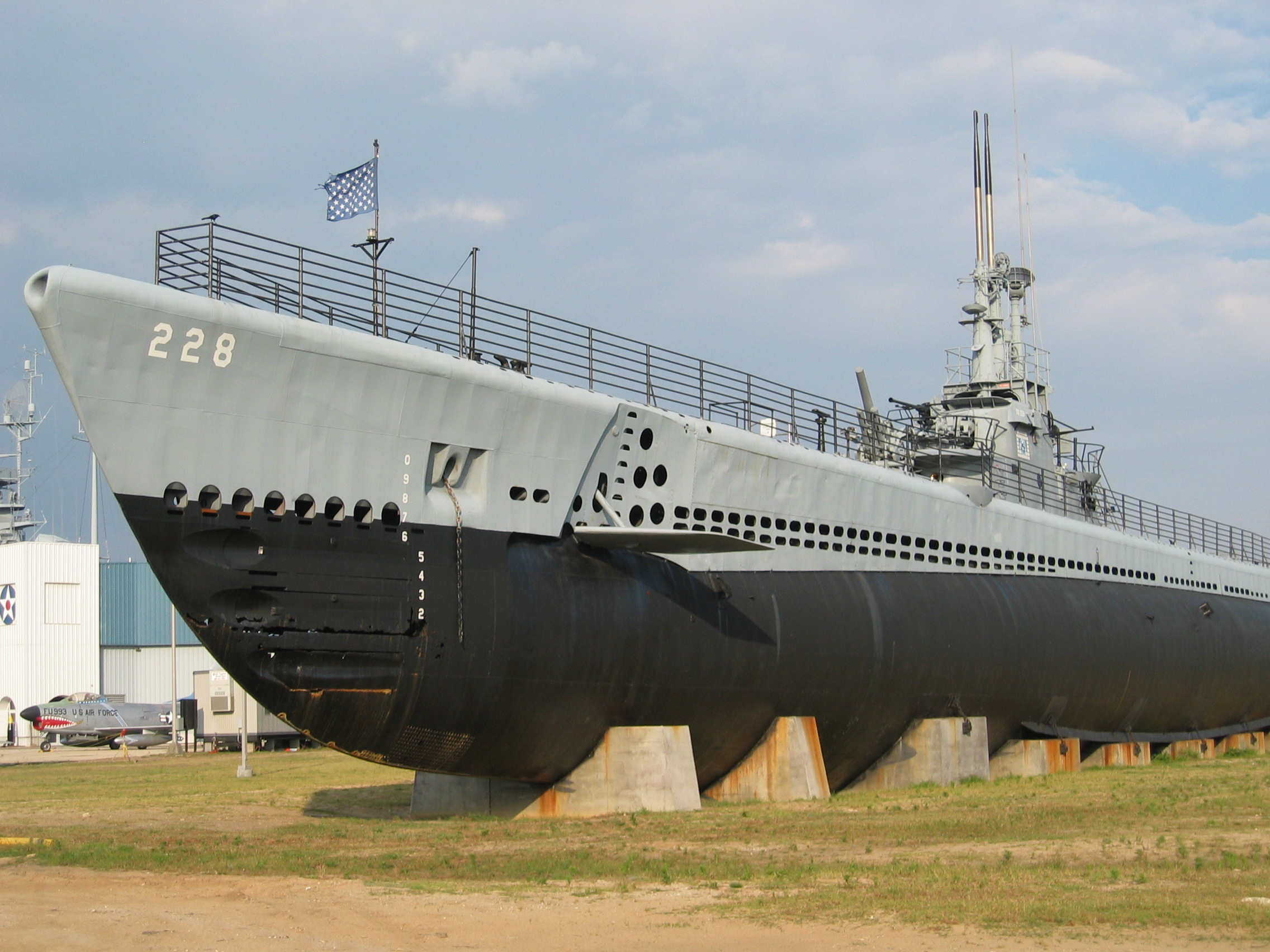
- USS Drum (SS-228) on display as a museum ship

History

United States
- Namesake: Drum, Fish
- Ordered: 12 June 1940
- Builder: Portsmouth Naval Shipyard, Kittery, Maine
- Laid down: 11 September 1940
- Launched: 12 May 1941
- Sponsored by: Mrs. Thomas Holcomb
- Commissioned: 1 November 1941
- Decommissioned: 16 February 1946
- Stricken: 30 June 1968
- Fate: Museum ship 14 April 1969
- Status: Museum ship at Mobile, Alabama
- Badge

General characteristics
- Class & type: Gato-class diesel-electric submarine
- Displacement: 1,490 long tons (1,514 t) surfaced; 2,060 long tons (2,093 t) submerged
- Length: 311 ft 9 in (95.02 m)
- Beam: 27 ft 3 in (8.31 m)
- Draft: 17 ft (5.2 m) maximum
- Propulsion: 4 × Fairbanks-Morse Model 38D8-1/8 9-cylinder opposed-piston diesel engines driving electrical generators; 2 × 126-cell Sargo batteries; 4 × high-speed Elliott electric motors with reduction gears; 2 × propellers; 5,400 shp (4.0 MW) surfaced; 2,740 shp (2.04 MW) submerged
- Speed: 21 knots (39 km/h; 24 mph) surfaced; 9 knots (17 km/h; 10 mph) submerged
- Range: 11,000 nmi (20,000 km; 13,000 mi) surfaced at 10 knots (19 km/h; 12 mph)
- Endurance: 48 hours at 2 knots (3.7 km/h; 2.3 mph) submerged, 75 days on patrol
- Test depth: 300 ft (91 m)
- Complement: 8 officers, 75 enlisted
- Armament: 10 × 21-inch (533 mm) torpedo tubes; 6 forward, 4 aft; 24 torpedoes; 1 × 3-inch (76 mm) / 50 caliber deck gun; Bofors 40 mm and Oerlikon 20 mm cannon
- USS Drum (submarine)
- U.S. National Register of Historic Places
- U.S. National Historic Landmark
- Location within Alabama
- Location: Mobile, Alabama
- Coordinates: 30°40′52″N 88°1′0″W
- Built: 1941
- Architect: Portsmouth Naval Shipyard
- NRHP reference No.: 86000086

Significant dates
- Added to NRHP: 14 January 1986
- Designated NHL: 14 January 1986

USS Drum (SS-228) is a Gato-class submarine of the United States Navy, the first Navy ship named after the drum, a type of fish. Drum is a museum ship in Mobile, Alabama, at Battleship Memorial Park.

Drum was the twelfth of the Gato class but was the first completed and the first to enter combat in World War II. She is the oldest of her class still in existence.

== Construction and commissioning ==
Drum was laid down on 11 September 1940 at Portsmouth Naval Shipyard in Kittery, Maine. She was launched on 12 May 1941, sponsored by Mrs. Beatrice M. Holcomb, wife of Major General Thomas Holcomb, Commandant of the United States Marine Corps. Drum was commissioned on 1 November 1941, with Commander Robert H. Rice in command.

== Service history ==
=== November 1941–April 1942 ===
After shakedown training, Drum set out to join the war in the Pacific, which began with the Japanese attack on Pearl Harbor on 7 December 1941. An Allied aircraft mistook her for a German U-boat and attacked her as she made the transit from the United States East Coast to the Panama Canal, probably in March 1942.

Drum arrived at Naval Station Pearl Harbor at Pearl Harbor, Hawaii, on 1 April 1942. She departed Pearl Harbor on 14 April 1942 and proceeded to Midway Atoll in the Northwestern Hawaiian Islands.

=== First war patrol ===
Drum departed Midway Atoll to begin her first war patrol. Cruising off the coast of Japan, she sank the Japanese seaplane tender Mizuho on 2 May and afterwards endured a 16-hour depth charge attack consisting of 31 depth charges. Later that month she sank three cargo ships (first unidentified, second: Shonan Maru (5000 BRT) third Kitakata Maru (2300 BRT) ) before returning to Pearl Harbor on 12 June to refit. For her efforts, the crew were awarded the Submarine Combat Patrol insignia.

=== Second war patrol ===
Drum's second war patrol, which she made in the waters between Truk and Kavieng from 10 July – 2 September, found her efforts frustrated by poor torpedo performance, but she damaged one freighter before returning to Midway to refit.

=== Third war patrol ===
The submarine sailed from Midway on 23 September on her third war patrol, bound for the eastern coast of Kyūshū. On 8 October, she contacted a convoy of four freighters, and defying the air cover guarding the ships, sank the 5652 ton cargo/passenger ship IJA Hague Maru laden with 4000 tons of wheat, machines, steel, oil, automobiles and captured paper money for the Formosa bank, before aerial bombs forced her deep. The next day, Drum underwent a severe depth charging from several escorts after she attacked and sank the 2461 ton cargo ship Hachimanzan Maru. On 20 October, she sank the 5106 ton Ryunan Maru, one of three air-escorted cargo ships, and damaged at least two more ships before completing her patrol at Pearl Harbor on 8 November.

=== Fourth war patrol ===
On her fourth patrol, 29 November 1942 – 24 January 1943, Drum carried out the demanding task of planting mines in heavily traveled Bungo Suido. On 12 December, she spotted the Japanese aircraft carrier Ryūhō, which had a full deck-load of planes. Although taking water forward due to faulty valves, Drum launched torpedoes at this choice target, scoring two hits, and causing the carrier to list so far that her flight deck became completely visible. Also visible was a destroyer bearing down, and splashes that indicated Drum's periscope was under fire. As the submarine dove, she lost depth control and her port shaft stopped turning. As she made emergency repairs, she underwent two waves of depth charging. When she surfaced several hours later to see what had become of her prey, which had escaped, an aircraft forced her down again. During this patrol, Drum also damaged a large tanker, another choice target.

=== Fifth and sixth war patrols ===
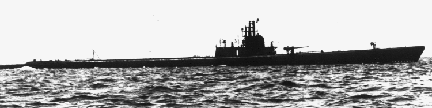
USS Drum, ca. 1943

After a thorough overhaul at Pearl Harbor, Drum made her fifth war patrol, 24 March – 13 May, searching waters south of Truk after she had completed a photographic reconnaissance of Nauru. She sank the cargo vessel Yuzan (Oyama) Maru of 3809 tons on 9 April, and on 18 April she sank the 6380 ton cargo ship Nisshun Maru, carrying a cargo of ammunition, then refitted at Brisbane, Australia. Her sixth war patrol, 7 June – 26 July, found her north of the Bismarck Archipelago, where on 17 June she found a three ship convoy consisting of two cargo ships under escort by a destroyer and sank the 5086 ton cargo-passenger ship Myoko Maru.

=== Seventh war patrol ===
She returned to Brisbane to replenish, and on 16 August sailed on her seventh war patrol. She damaged the 6439 ton cargo ship Yamagiri Maru, carrying a load of raw materials for the war effort, with two torpedoes on 28 August. Adding to her impressive list of sinkings, she sank the 1334 ton cargo ship Hakutetsu Maru 13 on 8 September, as well and patrolled off New Georgia during the landings there. She put into Tulagi from 29 September – 2 October to repair her gyrocompass, then sailed on to Brisbane.

=== Eighth war patrol ===
Drum sailed on 2 November for her eighth war patrol, coordinated with the landings at Cape Torokina. Patrolling between the Carolines and New Ireland, she sank the submarine tender Hie Maru (11,621 tons) on 17 November, and on 22 November attacked a convoy of four freighters. The convoy's escorts delivered three depth charge attacks. Drum was heavily damaged and ordered to Pearl Harbor. She arrived there on 5 December; inspection revealed that the conning tower needed to be replaced, which required that she sail to the West Coast.

=== Ninth war patrol ===
Returning to Pearl Harbor on 29 March 1944, Drum sailed 11 days later on her ninth war patrol, during which she patrolled the waters around Iwo Jima and other islands in the Bonin Islands. No worthy targets were contacted, but a reconnaissance of Chichi Jima gained valuable intelligence for bombardment of the island later by surface ships.

=== Tenth and eleventh war patrols ===
The submarine refitted at Majuro from 31 May – 24 June, then sailed on her 10th war patrol to give lifeguard service for raids on Yap and Palau. She sank a 125-ton sampan on 29 July, capturing two prisoners whom she brought back to Pearl Harbor on 14 August. For her efforts during the patrol the crew was granted the Submarine Combat Patrol insignia. She sailed for Surigao Strait on 9 September on her 11th war patrol, and after two weeks in the Strait with no contact, she was ordered north to the South China Sea. Here she patrolled during the Leyte landings and the decisive Battle for Leyte Gulf, and on 24 October sank the passenger-cargo ship Shikisan Maru (4725 tons). On 26 October Drum, made contact with a 13 ship convoy (10 merchant with three escorts) sinking two passenger-cargo ships, Taihaku Maru (6886 tons), Taisho Maru (6886 tons), and one transport ship, Tatsura Maru, (6420 tons), also damaging another passenger-cargo ship, Aoki Maru (3710 tons), bound for the Philippines with Japanese reinforcements. While sailing for Majuro for refit, Drum searched east of Luzon Strait for downed aviators.

=== Twelfth, thirteenth, and fourteenth patrols ===
Drum replenished and made repairs at Majuro from 8 November – 7 December, then sailed for the Nansei Shoto on her 12th war patrol. Only one contact was made during this patrol, and she returned to Guam on 17 January 1945. During her 13th war patrol, from 11 February – 2 April, Drum played a part in the assaults on both Iwo Jima and Okinawa, providing lifeguard service for air strikes on the Nansei Shoto and the Japanese home islands as bases were neutralized before both invasions. Returning to Pearl Harbor, Drum sailed to the U.S. West Coast for another overhaul, and after training at Pearl Harbor, cleared Midway on 9 August for her 14th war patrol. This was cut short by the Japanese surrender on 15 August. She proceeded to Saipan at the end of hostilities, and from there sailed for Pearl Harbor, the Panama Canal Zone, and Portsmouth, New Hampshire.

=== Post-World War II ===
Drum was decommissioned on 16 February 1946 and on 18 March 1947, began service at Washington, D.C., to members of the Naval Reserve in the Potomac River Naval Command, which continued through 1967. She was in the inactive Fleet at Norfolk, Virginia from 1967 to 1969.

== Awards ==
Drum received a total of 12 battle stars for her World War II service. She is credited with sinking 15 ships, a total of 80,580 tons of enemy shipping, eighth highest of all US submarines in total Japanese tonnage sunk.

== Museum ship and landmark ==
Drum was donated to the USS Alabama Battleship Commission on 14 April 1969. She was towed to Battleship Alabama Memorial Park in Mobile, Alabama arriving on 18 May 1969. Drum was dedicated and opened to the public on 4 July 1969.

The submarine was declared a National Historic Landmark in 1986.

Drum was moored in the waters behind Alabama, until she was substantially damaged by the storm surge of Hurricane Georges in 1998. As a result, she is now on display on shore. Alabama and Drum also sustained damage when Hurricane Katrina came ashore on 29 August 2005. Tours on board Drum resumed 9 January 2006. Most funding to maintain the submarine comes from a community of American Submarine Vets.

As of 2015, the Drum's restoration has progressed, including the complete rebuilding of part of the bow and stern sections and the installation of new I-beams inside the ballast tanks to support the submarine's overall weight.

Gallery

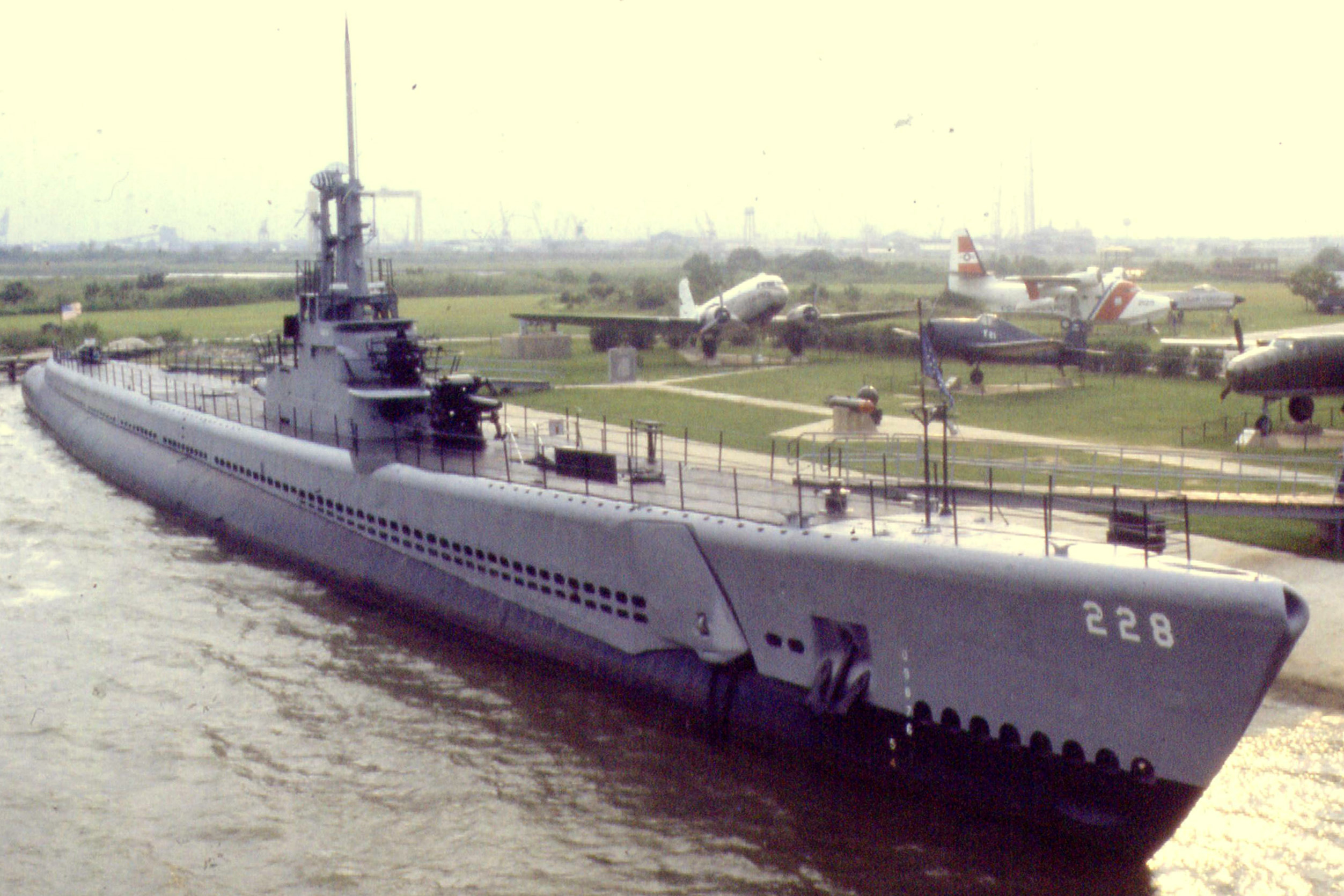
Drum in 1983, prior to her relocation

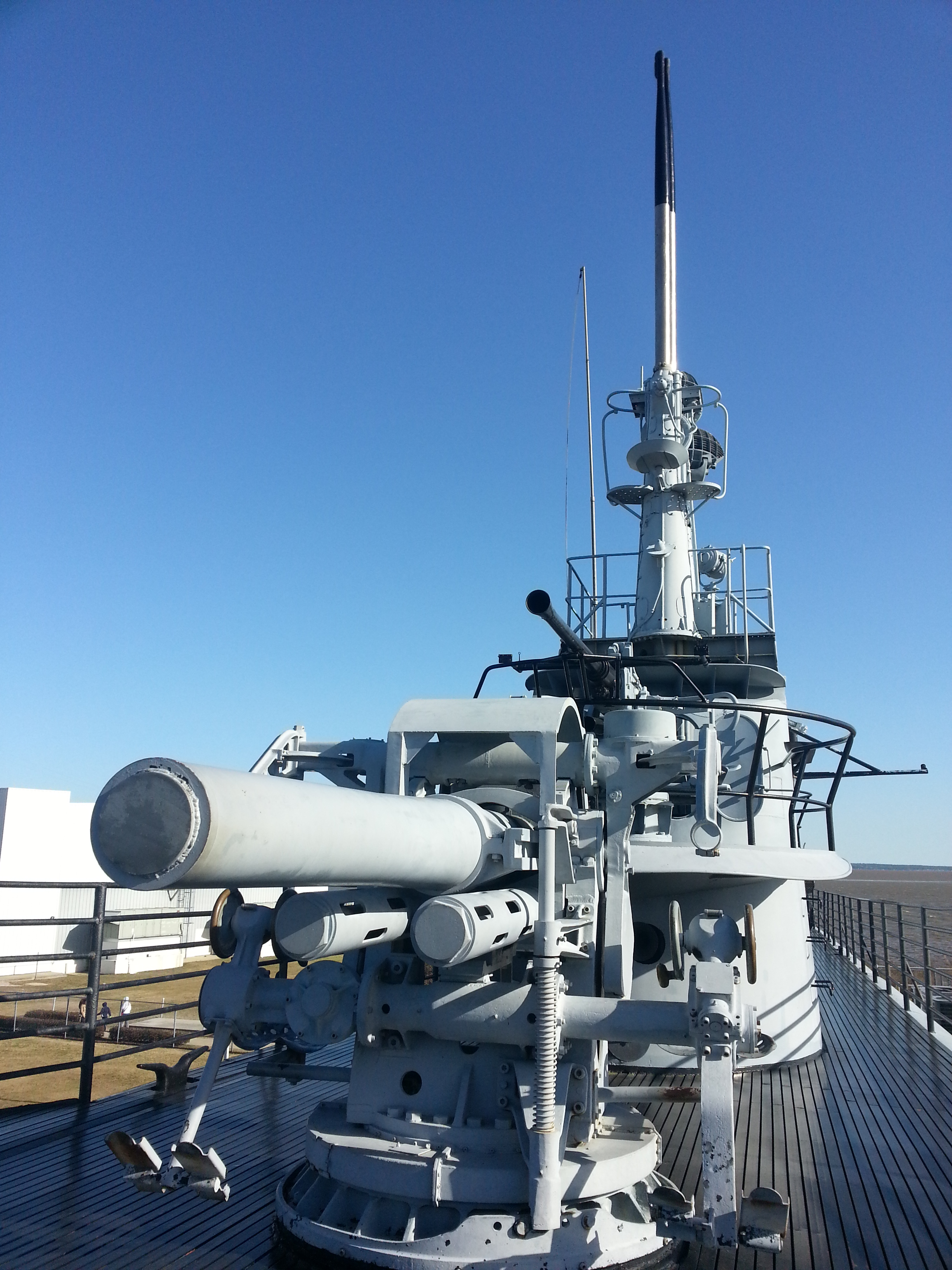
Drum Topside

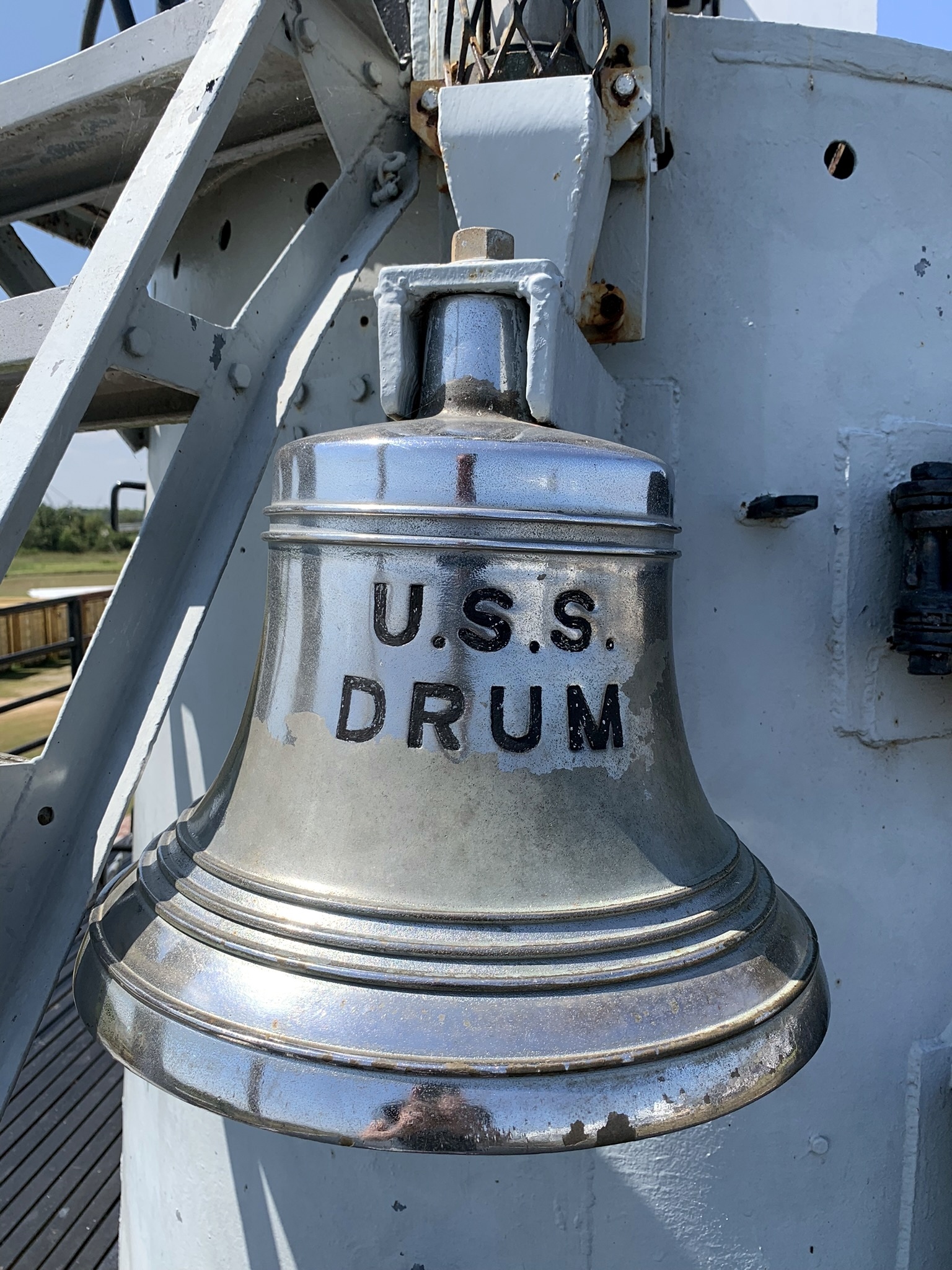
Bell

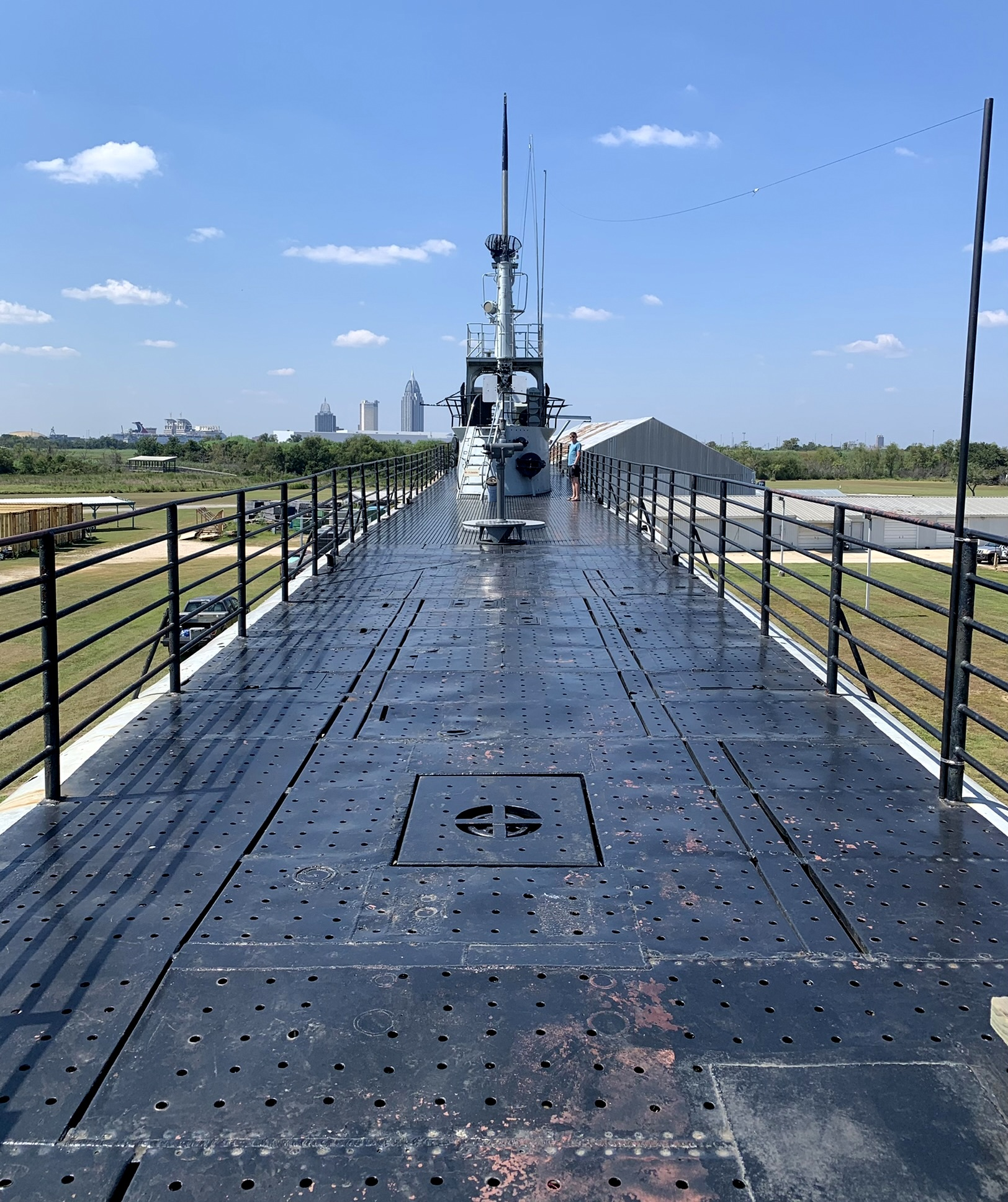
Exterior with Mobile skyline in background

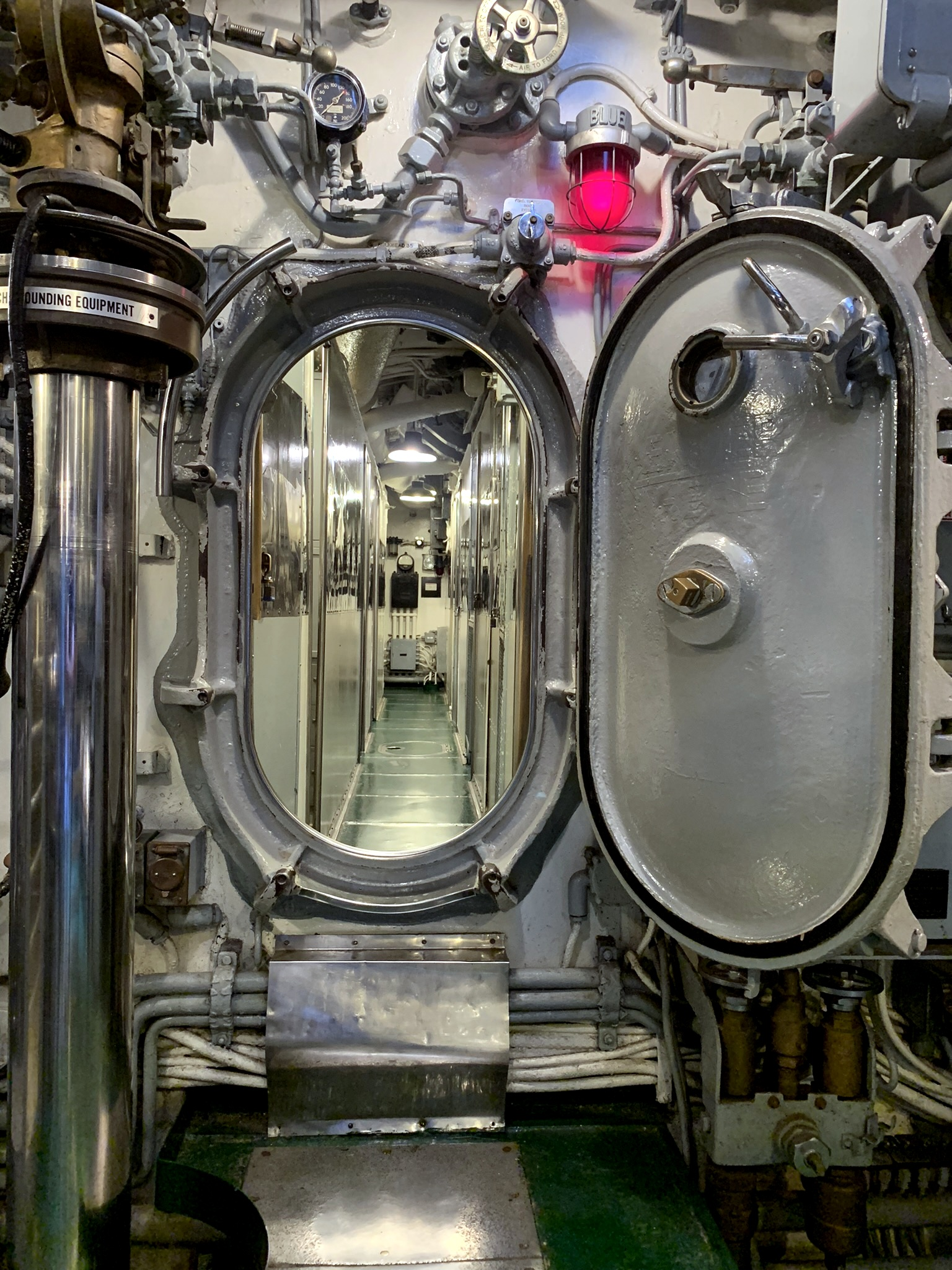
Interior

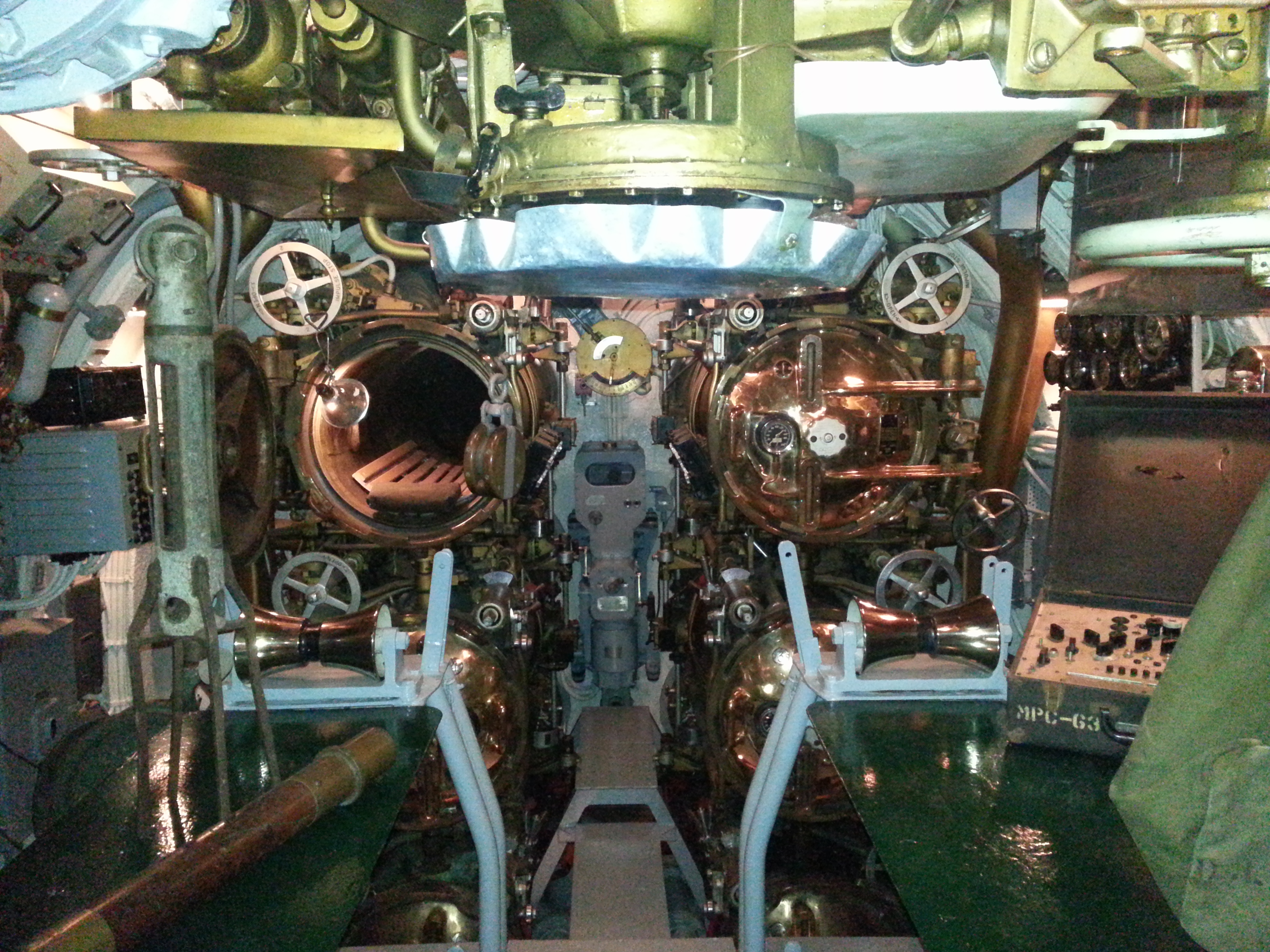
Drum Forward Torpedo room

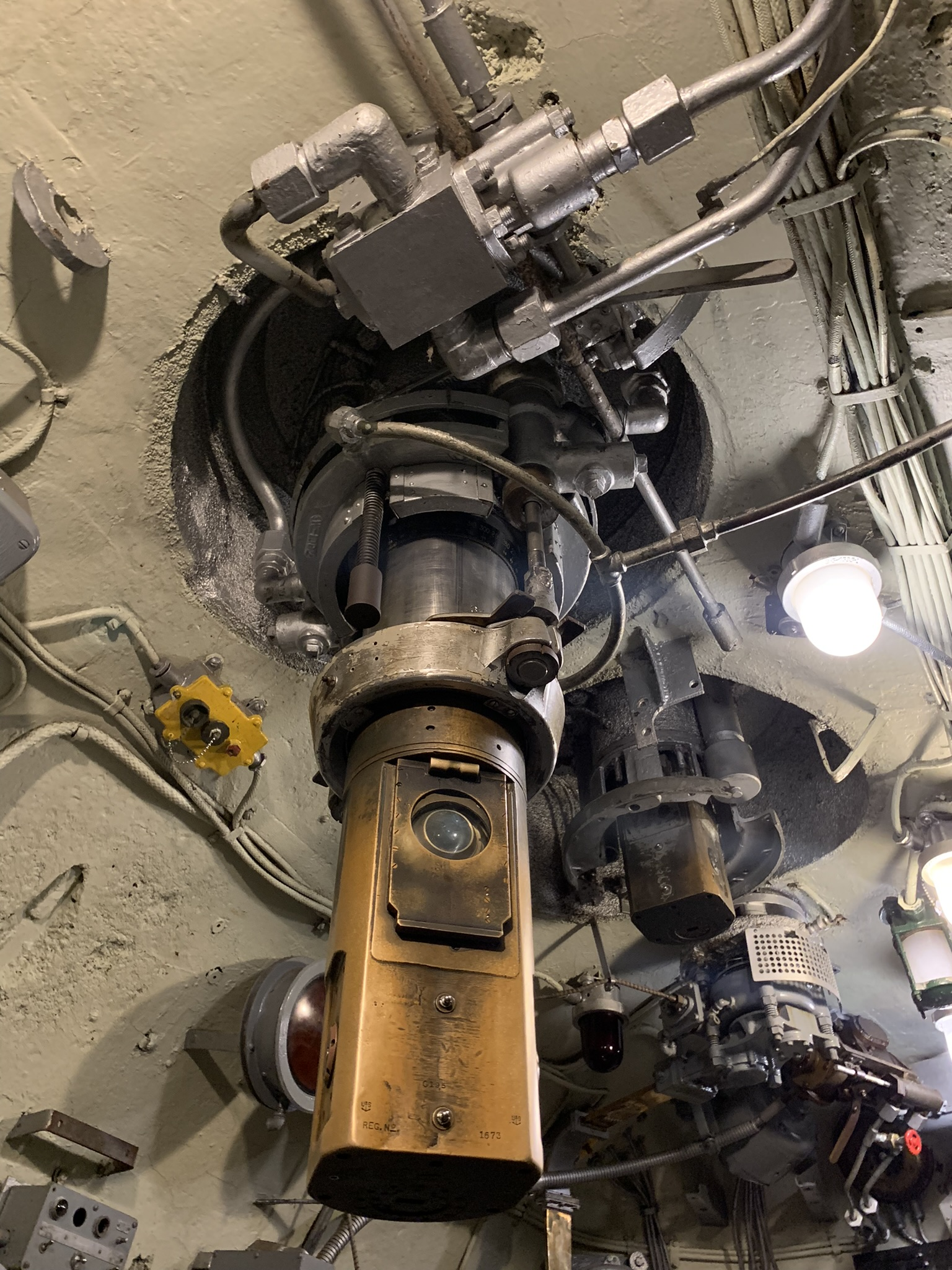
Periscope

== See also ==
- List of most successful American submarines in World War II
- List of National Historic Landmarks in Alabama
