= Robert H. Rice =

American submarine commander

Robert Henry Rice
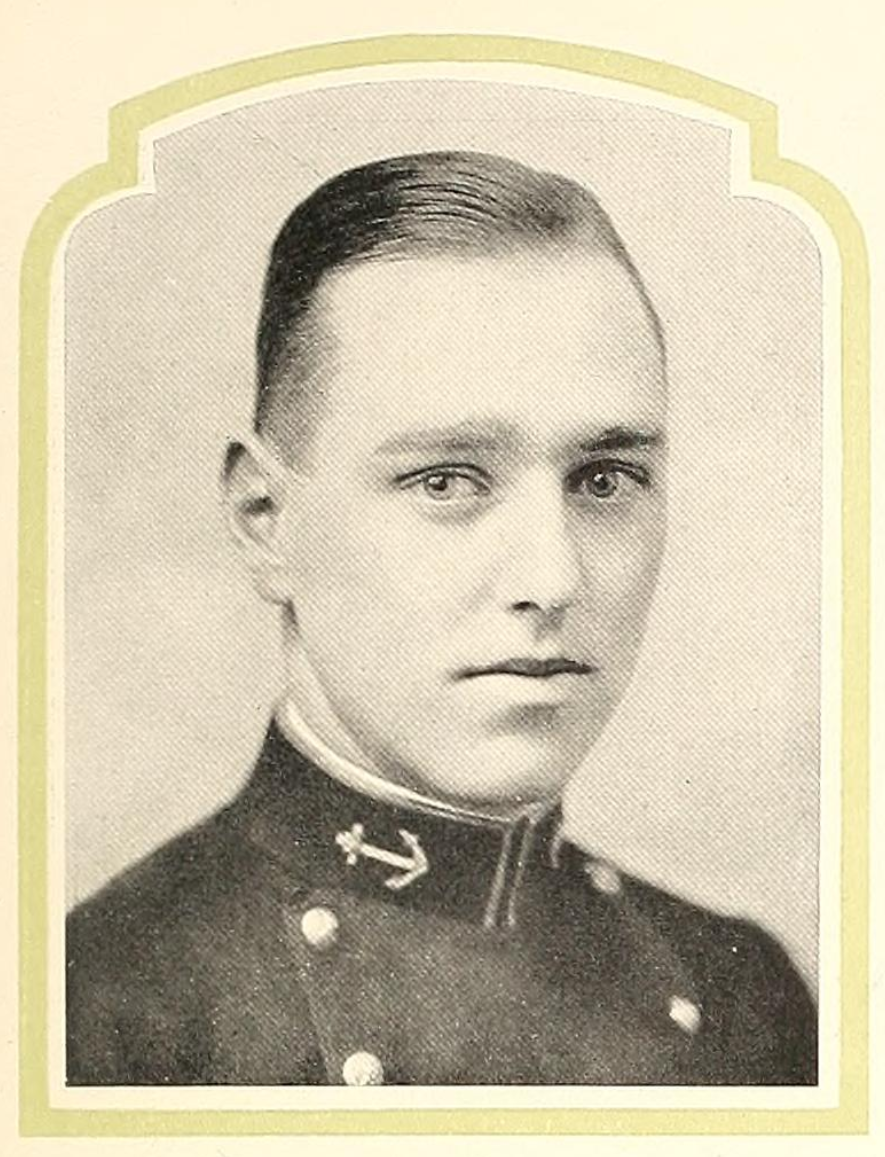
- Midshipman Robert H. Rice
- Born: November 17, 1903; Pittsfield, Massachusetts, US
- Died: May 20, 1994 (aged 90); Brattleboro, Vermont, US
- Alma mater: United States Naval Academy
- Spouse: Eunice Willson
- Relatives: CAPT Herbert P. Rice (Brother); ADM Russell Willson (father-in-law)
- Military career
- Allegiance: United States
- Branch: United States Navy
- Service years: 1927–1957
- Rank: Vice Admiral
- Commands: USS S-30 (SS-135); USS S-24 (SS-129); USS Sequoia; USS Drum (SS-228); USS Paddle; USS New Jersey (BB-62)
- Conflicts: World War II
- Awards: Navy Cross (2); Bronze Star

Robert Henry Rice (17 Sep 1903 – 20 May 1994), was an American submarine commander during World War II who was awarded the Navy Cross twice. He reached the rank of vice admiral in the United States Navy.

== Early life and education ==
Robert Henry Rice was born on September 17, 1903, in Pittsfield, Massachusetts. He spent his early years in Pittsfield, where he attended local schools. In 1922, Rice graduated from the Hoosac School in Hoosick, New York, and Rice received an appointment to the United States Naval Academy in Annapolis, Maryland. He entered the Academy in 1923 from Missouri, graduated in 1927, and earned his commission as an ensign in the United States Navy.

== Early naval career ==
Ensign Robert Henry Rice's first assignment after graduating from the Naval Academy was aboard the battleship USS Texas. In 1930, Rice was promoted to lieutenant junior grade (LTJG) and was transferred to the heavy cruiser USS Pennsylvania. The following year, LTJG Rice was transferred to the gunboat USS Luzon, where he performed patrols along the Yangtze River in China in 1931 and 1932.

In 1933, Rice was ordered to Naval Submarine Base New London, to be qualified as a submarine officer. He was subsequently assigned to USS S-12. In 1935, Rice was sent back to the United States Naval Academy for additional training to command submarines, and the following year assigned to USS S-34. In 1937, Rice was promoted to the rank of lieutenant commander and was given command of the submarine S-30. He held that command until 1940, when he was transferred to command the Secretary of the Navy's yacht, USS Sequoia.

== World War II ==
Lt. Cmdr. Robert Rice, took command of the USS Drum of November 1, 1941 at her commissioning. Rice and his crew conducted her shakedown from her commissioning until the attack on Pearl Harbor, December 7.

== Navy Cross citations ==
Throughout his career, Robert Henry Rice received several prestigious awards, including the following two Navy Cross citations:

First Navy Cross

In 1942, Lieutenant Commander Robert Henry Rice (NSN: 0-61242), United States Navy, earned a Navy Cross for "extraordinary heroism" as a Commanding Officer of the U.S.S. DRUM (SS-228). This came as a result of the first War Patrol of that submarine during the time period April 17, 1942 – June 12, 1942 in which Lieutenant Commander Rice directed his submarine through enemy controlled waters just off the coast of the enemy's homeland. It is stated by the Military Times' Hall of Valor website, that Lieutenant Commander Rice "coolly and resolutely pressed home every favorable attack opportunity", leading him to succeed in penetrating a screen to sink one enemy seaplane carrier of 9,000 tons and three merchant ships (totaling 15,000 tons). The Military Times' Hall of Valor website goes on to claim that after three of these attacks, Lieutenant Commander Rice's submarine was targeted by the enemy for prolonged attacks, which ultimately resulted in his ship and personnel being "unscathed", assumedly due to Lieutenant Commander Rice's leadership. It is stated (once again, by the Military Times' Hall of Valor website) that the Lieutenant Commander's conduct in this expedition was an "inspiration" to his officers and men in keeping with the highest traditions of the United States Naval Service.

Second Navy Cross

The President of the United States of America presented a Gold Star in lieu of a Second Award of the Navy Cross to Lieutenant Commander Robert Henry Rice (NSN: 0-61242), United States Navy, for extraordinary heroism in the line of his profession as Commanding Officer of the U.S.S. DRUM (SS-228), on the third War Patrol of that submarine during the period 23 September 1942 to 8 November 1942, in enemy controlled waters of the Pacific War Area. Lieutenant Commander Rice distinguished himself in his military operations against armed enemy forces and succeeded in sinking 19,539 tons and inflicting damage upon one freighter of 6,700 tons. Despite the activity of numerous patrol craft engaged in anti-submarine measures in his area, he maneuvered his ship in such a manner that he brought it through without damage and his crew home without loss or injury. His conduct throughout was an inspiration to his officers and men and in keeping with the highest traditions of the United States Naval Service.
