= USS Alabama (BB-60) =

Fast battleship of the United States Navy

Coordinates: 30.68178°N 88.01448°W

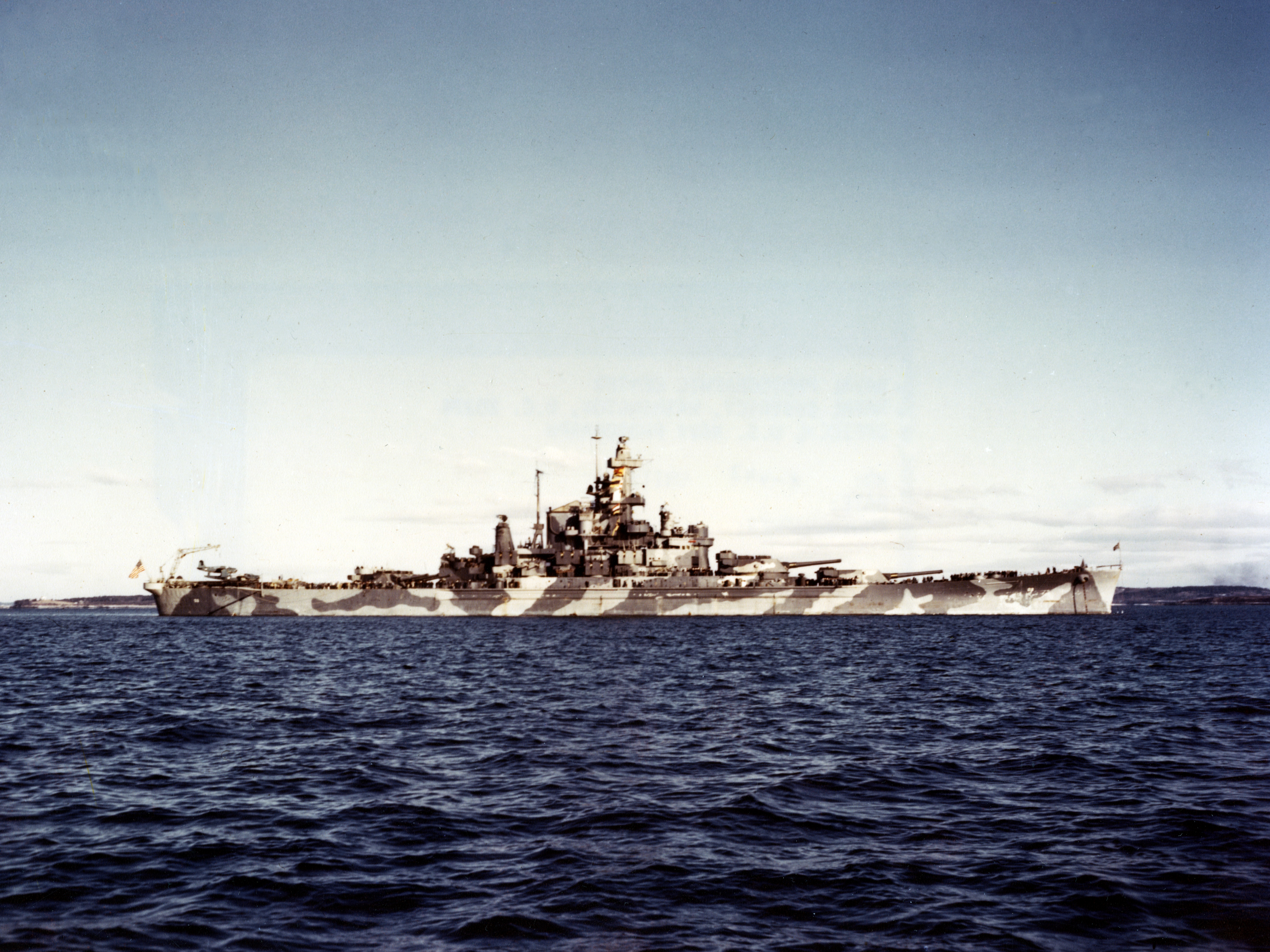
- USS Alabama in Casco Bay in 1942

History

United States
- Name: Alabama
- Namesake: Alabama
- Ordered: 1 April 1939
- Builder: Norfolk Navy Yard
- Laid down: 1 February 1940
- Launched: 16 February 1942
- Commissioned: 16 August 1942
- Decommissioned: 9 January 1947
- Stricken: 1 June 1962
- Identification: Hull number: BB-60
- Status: Museum ship since 11 June 1964 at the Battleship Memorial Park

General characteristics
- Class & type: South Dakota-class battleship
- Displacement: Standard: 37,970 long tons (38,580 t); Full load: 44,519 long tons (45,233 t)
- Length: 680 ft (210 m) o/a
- Beam: 108 ft 2 in (32.97 m)
- Draft: 35 ft 1 in (10.69 m)
- Installed power: 130,000 shp (97,000 kW); 8 × Babcock & Wilcox boilers
- Propulsion: 4 × General Electric steam turbines; 4 × screw propellers
- Speed: 27.5 knots (50.9 km/h; 31.6 mph)
- Range: 15,000 nmi (28,000 km; 17,000 mi) at 15 knots (28 km/h; 17 mph)
- Crew: 1,793 officers and enlisted men (peace); 2,500 officers and enlisted men (war)
- Armament: 9 × 16 in (406 mm) guns; 20 × 5 in (127 mm) DP guns; 6 × quadruple 40 mm (1.6 in) AA guns; 35 × single 20 mm (0.8 in) AA guns
- Armor: Belt: 12.2 in (310 mm); Deck: 6 in (152 mm); Turrets: 18 in (457 mm); Barbettes: 17.3 in (440 mm); Conning tower: 16 in
- Aircraft carried: 3 × "Kingfisher" floatplanes
- Aviation facilities: 2 × catapults

USS Alabama, hull number BB-60, is a retired battleship. She was the fourth and final member of the South Dakota class of fast battleships built for the United States Navy in the 1940s during World War II. The first American battleships designed after the Washington Treaty system began to break down in the mid-1930s, they took advantage of an escalator clause that allowed increasing the main battery to 16-inch (406 mm) guns, but Congressional refusal to authorize larger battleships kept their displacement close to the Washington limit of 35,000 long tons (36,000 t). A requirement to be armored against the same caliber of guns as they carried, combined with the displacement restriction, resulted in cramped ships. Overcrowding was exacerbated by wartime modifications that considerably strengthened their anti-aircraft batteries and significantly increased their crews.

After entering service, Alabama was briefly deployed to strengthen the British Home Fleet, tasked with protecting convoys to the Soviet Union. In 1943, she was transferred to the Pacific for operations against Japan; the first of these was the Gilbert and Marshall Islands campaign that began in November that year. While operating in the Pacific, she served primarily as an escort for the fast carrier task force to protect the aircraft carriers from surface and air attacks. She also frequently bombarded Japanese positions in support of amphibious assaults. She took part in the Mariana and Palau Islands campaign in June–September and the Philippines campaign in October–December. After a refit in early 1945, she returned to the fleet for operations during the Battle of Okinawa and the series of attacks on the Japanese mainland in July and August, including several bombardments of coastal industrial targets.

Alabama assisted in Operation Magic Carpet after the war, carrying some 700 men home from the former war zone. She was decommissioned in 1947 and assigned to the Pacific Reserve Fleet, where she remained until 1962 when she was stricken from the Naval Vessel Register. A campaign to save the ship from the breakers' yard succeeded in raising the necessary funds, and Alabama was preserved as a museum ship in Mobile Bay, Alabama at Battleship Memorial Park.

== Design ==
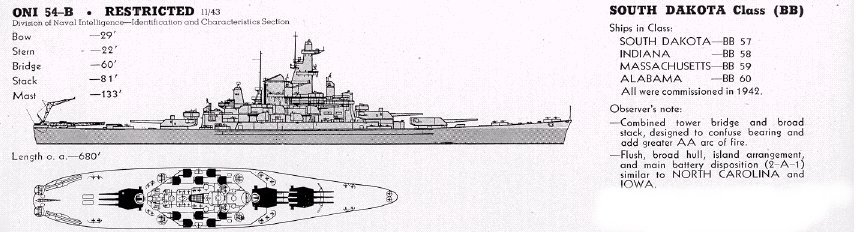
Recognition drawing of the South Dakota class

The South Dakota class was ordered in the context of global naval rearmament during the breakdown of the Washington treaty system that had controlled battleships construction during the 1920s and early 1930s. Under the Washington and London treaties, so-called treaty battleships were limited to a standard displacement of 35,000 long tons (36,000 t) and a main battery of 14-inch (356 mm) guns. In 1936, following Japan's decision to abandon the treaty system, the United States Navy decided to invoke the "escalator clause" in the Second London treaty that allowed displacements to rise to 45,000 long tons (46,000 t) and armament to increase to 16 in (406 mm) guns. Congressional objections to increasing the size of the new ships forced the design staff to keep displacement as close to 35,000 LT as possible while incorporating the larger guns and armor sufficient to defeat guns of the same caliber.

Alabama is 680 feet (210 m) long overall and has a beam of 108 ft 2 in (32.97 m) and a draft of 35 ft 1 in (10.69 m). She displaced 37,970 long tons (38,580 t) as designed and up to 44,519 long tons (45,233 t) at full combat load. The ship was powered by four General Electric steam turbines, each driving one propeller shaft, using steam provided by eight oil-fired Babcock & Wilcox boilers. Rated at 130,000 shaft horsepower (97,000 kW), the turbines were intended to give a top speed of 27.5 knots (50.9 km/h; 31.6 mph). The ship had a cruising range of 15,000 nautical miles (28,000 km; 17,000 mi) at a speed of 15 knots (28 km/h; 17 mph). She carried three Vought OS2U Kingfisher floatplanes for aerial reconnaissance, which were launched by a pair of aircraft catapults on her fantail. Her peacetime crew numbered 1,793 officers and enlisted men, but during the war the crew swelled to 2,500.

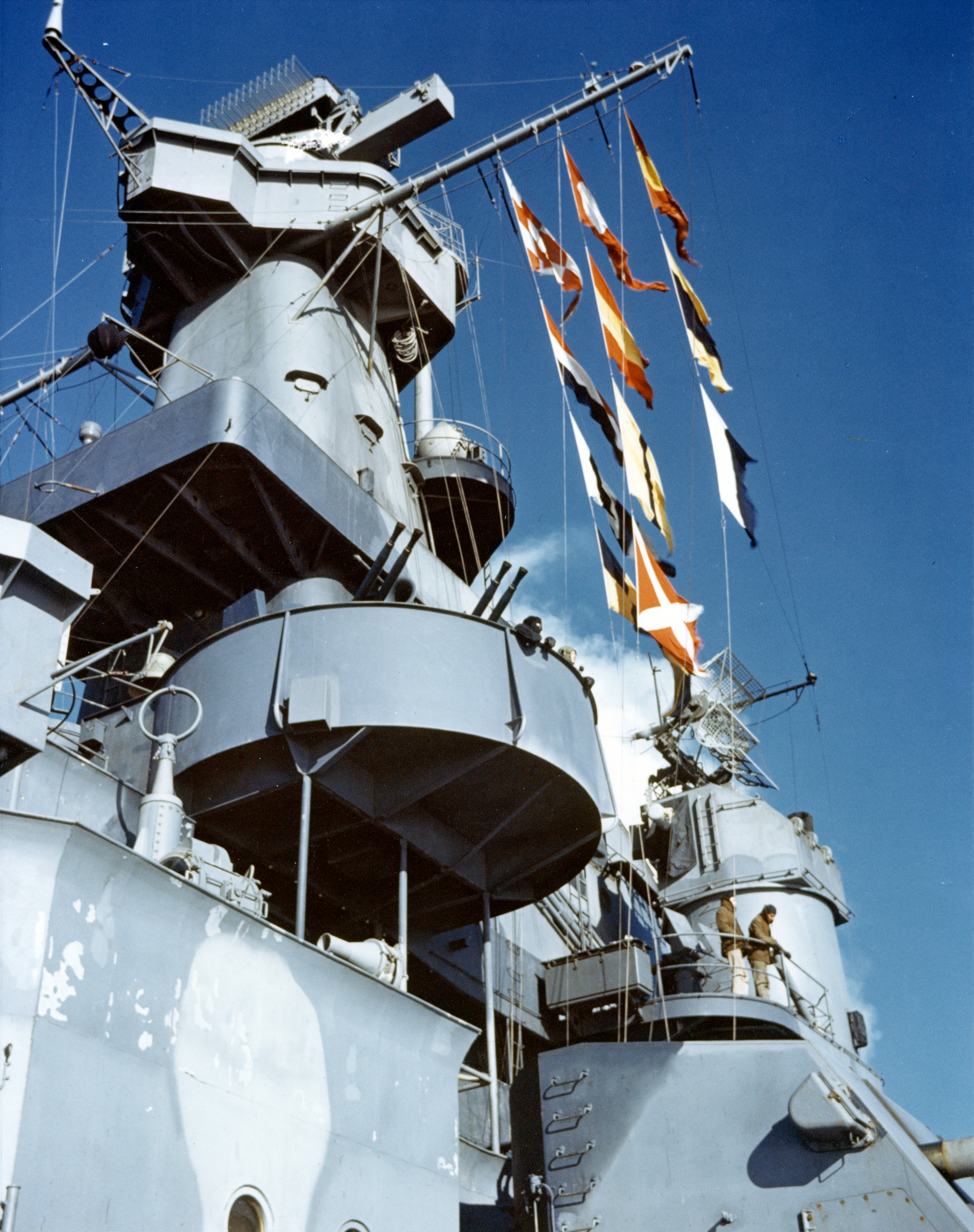
Alabama's foremast, showing the Mk 8 radar atop the Mk 38 main battery director; note the Mk 4 radar (right) for the secondary battery

The ship was armed with a main battery of nine 16"/45 caliber Mark 6 guns (Note: /45 refers to the length of the gun in terms of calibers. A /45 gun is 45 times long as its bore diameter.) in three triple-gun turrets on the centerline, two of which were placed in a superfiring pair forward, with the third aft. The secondary battery consisted of twenty 5-inch /38 caliber dual-purpose guns mounted in twin turrets clustered amidships, five turrets on either side. As designed, the ship was equipped with an anti-aircraft battery of twelve 1.1 in (28 mm) guns and twelve .50-caliber (12.7 mm) M2 Browning machine guns, (Note: In the context of small arms, caliber refers to the bore diameter; in this case, a .50-caliber machine gun is a half-inch in diameter.) but she was completed with a battery of six quadruple 40 mm (1.6 in) Bofors guns in place of the 1.1 in guns and thirty-five 20 mm (0.79 in) Oerlikon autocannon in single mounts instead of the .50-cal. guns.

The main armored belt is 12.2 in (310 mm) thick, while the main armored deck is up to 6 in (152 mm) thick. The main battery gun turrets have 18 in (457 mm) thick faces, and they are mounted atop barbettes that are 17.3 in (440 mm) thick. The conning tower has 16 in (406 mm) thick sides.

=== Modifications ===
Alabama received a series of modifications through her wartime career, consisting primarily of additions to the anti-aircraft battery and various types of radar sets. The first addition was the installation of SC air search radar in 1941, fitted in the foremast, which was later replaced with an SK type set. At the same time, an SG surface search radar was installed on the forward superstructure; a second SG set was added to the main mast after experiences during the Guadalcanal campaign in 1942. In 1943, she received a Mark 3 fire-control radar, mounted on her conning tower to assist in the direction of her main battery guns. The Mark 3 was quickly replaced with more modern Mark 8 fire-control radar, and Mark 4 radars for the secondary battery guns. She later received Mark 12/22 sets in place of the Mark 4s. Alabama also received a TDY jammer. In 1945, her traditional spotting scopes were replaced with Mark 27 microwave radar sets.

The ship's light anti-aircraft battery was gradually expanded. Four more 40 mm quadruple mounts were allocated to the ship in late 1942, but by the time she underwent her refit in November 1943, the allotted armament had been increased to twelve quadruple mounts. Two more were to be added to the forecastle in 1945, but experience with other ships demonstrated these to be excessively wet in most sea conditions and thus unusable, so they were never installed aboard Alabama. In May 1943, she had another eight 20 mm guns installed, bringing the total to fifty-three of the guns. By 1945, the ship's 20 mm battery had grown to fifty-six guns, all in single mounts. She was slated to have these exchanged for forty twin mounts, but the work was not done before the war ended and she was removed from service.

== Service history ==
=== Construction and Atlantic operations ===
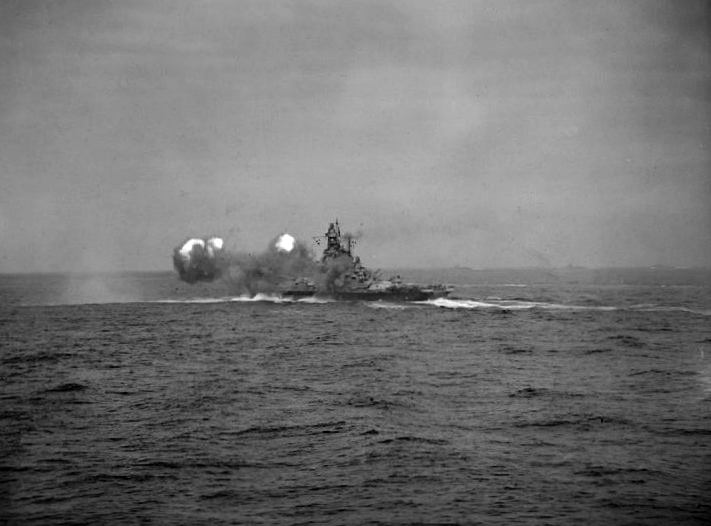
Alabama fires a salvo during exercises with the British Home Fleet in 1943

The keel for Alabama was laid down on 1 February 1940 at the Norfolk Navy Yard. She was launched on 16 February 1942; Crane Ship No. 1 (ex-Kearsarge) assisted with the installation of the ship's heavy armor and armament. She was commissioned just six months later on 16 August. Fitting-out work then commenced, and on 11 November she began her shakedown cruise in the Chesapeake Bay. She then began initial training to prepare the ship's crew for wartime service, first out of Casco Bay, Maine. On 11 January 1943, Alabama returned to Chesapeake Bay for further training before moving to Norfolk. She was then assigned to Task Group (TG) 22.2 and sent back to Casco Bay on 13 February for tactical training.

Alabama's first deployment came in April with the temporary assignment to the British Home Fleet to reinforce the Allied naval forces available to escort the Arctic convoys to the Soviet Union. At the time, the British had sent several capital ships to the Mediterranean Sea to support the Allied invasion of Sicily, stripping away forces necessary to counter German naval strength in Norway, most significantly the battleship Tirpitz. Accordingly, Alabama and her sister ship South Dakota got underway on 2 April as part of Task Force (TF) 22. Screened by five destroyers, the two battleships steamed to the Orkney Islands by way of Little Placentia Sound and Naval Station Argentia, Newfoundland, arriving in the main British naval base at Scapa Flow on 19 May. There, they were organized as TF 61, Home Fleet, and the ships began thorough training to familiarize the American ships with their British counterparts for joint operations. TF 61 was commanded by Rear Admiral Olaf M. Hustvedt; over the course of the next three months, they frequently operated with the battleships HMS Anson and Duke of York.

Alabama, South Dakota, and several British units covered an operation to reinforce the island of Spitzbergen in the Arctic Ocean in early June. The following month, Alabama took part in Operation Governor, a demonstration to distract German attention during the Sicily invasion. The Allies also hoped to lure out Tirpitz to sink her, but the Germans took no notice of the ships and remained in port. On 1 August, Alabama and South Dakota were detached to return to the United States; they departed immediately and arrived in Norfolk on 9 August, where Alabama underwent an overhaul in preparation for operations against Japanese forces in the Pacific Theater. Alabama emerged from the shipyard on 20 August and began the voyage to the Pacific by way of the Panama Canal, which she transited on 25 August. She reached Efate in the New Hebrides on 14 September.

=== Pacific operations ===
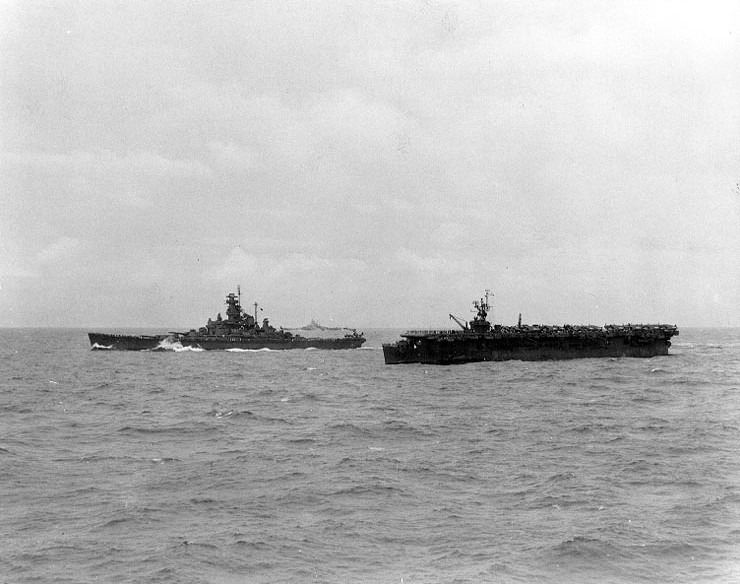
Alabama escorting the aircraft carrier USS Monterey en route to the Marshall Islands

==== Gilbert and Marshall Islands campaign ====
On arriving in the south Pacific, Alabama embarked on an extensive training program that lasted for a month and a half to prepare the battleship to operate with the fast carrier task force. She then steamed to Fiji on 7 November before departing four days later to support the Gilbert and Marshall Islands campaign, which began with the invasion of Tarawa on 20 November. Alabama escorted the aircraft carriers while they struck Japanese airfields on nearby islands in the Marshalls to neutralize their ability to interfere with the landing. She then supported the landing on Betio in the Tarawa Atoll on 20 November, followed by the landing at Makin. Alabama twice engaged Japanese aircraft that approached the fleet on the night of 26 November.

Alabama and five other fast battleships bombarded Nauru on 8 December, which the Japanese used as a source of phosphate. The destroyer Boyd, which had been hit by Japanese artillery fire, came alongside Alabama and transferred three wounded men to the battleship. The ships then escorted the carriers Bunker Hill and Monterey back to Efate, which they reached on 12 December. Alabama got underway on 5 January 1944 for Pearl Harbor, arriving on 12 January for maintenance that included replacing one of her propellers. She arrived in Funafuti in the Ellice Islands on 21 January, where she joined the fleet for the next operation in the campaign. She was assigned to Task Group (TG) 58.2, which sortied on 25 January to begin Operation Flintlock, the invasion of Kwajalein. Alabama, South Dakota, and the battleship North Carolina shelled the island of Roi-Namur over the course of 29 and 30 January, targeting defensive positions, airfields, and other facilities. For the remainder of the campaign, she patrolled to the north of Kwajalein to guard against a possible Japanese counterattack that did not materialize.

Over the next two months, the fast carrier task force embarked on a series of raids on Japanese-held islands in the central Pacific to prepare for the next major offensive. The ships of TG 58.2 sortied on 12 February to participate in Operation Hailstone, a major raid on the island of Truk, which had been the primary staging area for the Japanese fleet in the central Pacific. Alabama escorted the carriers that struck the island over the course of 16–17 February, inflicting heavy damage to the Japanese forces and infrastructure there. The fleet then continued on to raid Japanese bases on Saipan, Tinian, and Guam. During a Japanese air attack on the fleet on 21 February, Alabama's No. 9 5-inch turret accidentally fired into the No. 5 mount, killing five and wounding eleven men. That day, Alabama took part in a sweep to the southeast of Saipan to search for Japanese vessels that might be in the area. Having found none, the fleet steamed to Majuro to replenish fuel and ammunition. While there, she served as the flagship of Vice Admiral Marc Mitscher, the commander of the fast carrier task force, from 3 to 8 March.

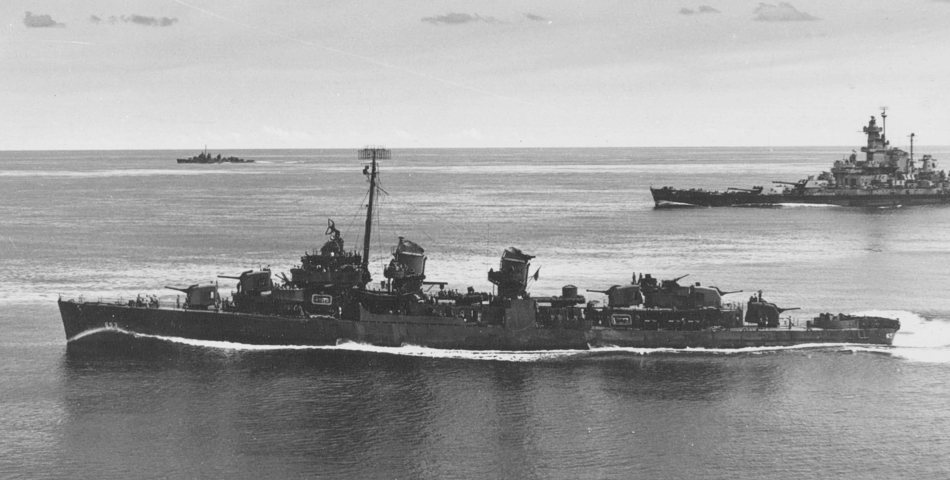
Alabama cruising with her screen of escorting destroyers in April 1944; Knapp is in the foreground

Alabama and the rest of the fleet departed Majuro on 22 March to attack the next set of targets: Palau, Yap, Ulithi, and Woleai in the Caroline Islands. By this time, Alabama had been transferred to TG 58.3 as part of the screen for the carrier Yorktown. While en route to the Carolines, the ships came under attack from a group of Japanese aircraft on the night of 29 March and Alabama shot one of them down and assisted with another. The next day, the carriers began their raids and Alabama stood by, engaging Japanese aircraft as they attacked the fleet. She helped to drive off a lone Japanese aircraft late that day before it could close to attack. The fleet then returned to Majuro for replenishment before departing on 13 April; Alabama now escorted the veteran carrier Enterprise for a series of strikes along the coast of western New Guinea in support of Army operations in the New Guinea campaign. The final action in the series of raids saw the fleet return to the Carolines to strike Pohnpei, which Alabama and five other battleships bombarded on 1 May. The group then returned once again to Eniwetok on 4 May to begin preparations for the invasion of the Marianas.

==== Mariana and Palau Islands campaign ====
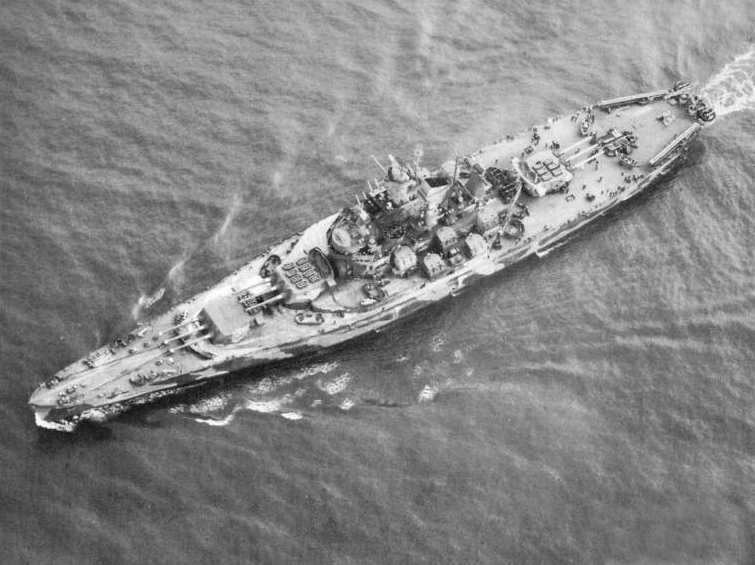
Aerial recognition photo of Alabama, c. 1942

Alabama sortied with the rest of TF 58 in early June, now as part of TG 58.7; the fleet had arrived off the initial target, Saipan, by 12 June. The next day, Alabama took part in a preparatory bombardment of the island intended to weaken Japanese defenses so that minesweepers could begin to clear approaches to the landing beach. Alabama's gunners were not as experienced with shore bombardment as other dedicated bombardment ships, and her shooting was not particularly effective. She thereafter screened the carriers as they struck Japanese positions around the island, and ground troops landed on the island on 15 June. The landing was a breach of Japan's inner defensive perimeter that triggered the Japanese fleet to launch a major counter-thrust with the 1st Mobile Fleet, the main carrier strike force.

The Japanese fleet arrived on 19 June, leading to the Battle of the Philippine Sea. Alabama was the first vessel to pick up the incoming Japanese aircraft on her radar, 141 nautical miles (261 km; 162 mi) away, at 10:06. The battleship Iowa quickly corroborated the report, and 40 minutes later the Japanese aircraft arrived over the fleet. A total of seven waves hit the American fleet, though only three of them hit TG 58.7. Of those, Alabama was able to engage Japanese aircraft in two of the attacks. During one of the attacks, a pair of aircraft penetrated the Combat Air Patrols and attacked South Dakota, and Alabama was among the vessels that fired on them. About an hour after that attack, two torpedo bombers attempted to attack South Dakota again, but Alabama helped to drive them off with a barrage of anti-aircraft fire. During this latter attack, a single dive bomber was able to use the gunners' distraction with the torpedo bombers to approach Alabama, but the pilot nevertheless missed with his bombs and caused no damage. Vice Admiral Willis A. Lee, the TG 58.7 commander, commended Alabama's radar operators for their prompt detection of the Japanese aircraft, which allowed the American carriers to launch their fighters with enough time to intercept the attackers away from the fleet.

Alabama remained on station, escorting the carriers while they raided Saipan, Guam, Tinian, and Rota throughout the campaign. She was then detached from the fleet to Eniwetok in the Marshalls for periodic maintenance. The ship then became the flagship of Rear Admiral Edward Hanson, the commander of Battleship Division (BatDiv) 9, and left the island on 14 July in company with Bunker Hill. The next stage in the campaign, the invasion of Guam, began on 21 July and Alabama performed her role of carrier escort during operations there for the next three weeks. On 11 August, she left to return to Eniwetok before embarking on the next assault on 30 August, code-named Operation Stalemate II; this consisted of a series of landings on Pelelieu, Ulithi, and Yap. By this time, the fast carrier task force had been transferred from Fifth Fleet to Third Fleet and accordingly renumbered as TF 38, so Alabama was now part of TG 38.3. She escorted the carriers while they launched a series of strikes on the islands from 6 to 8 September to prepare for the amphibious assaults.

==== Philippines campaign ====
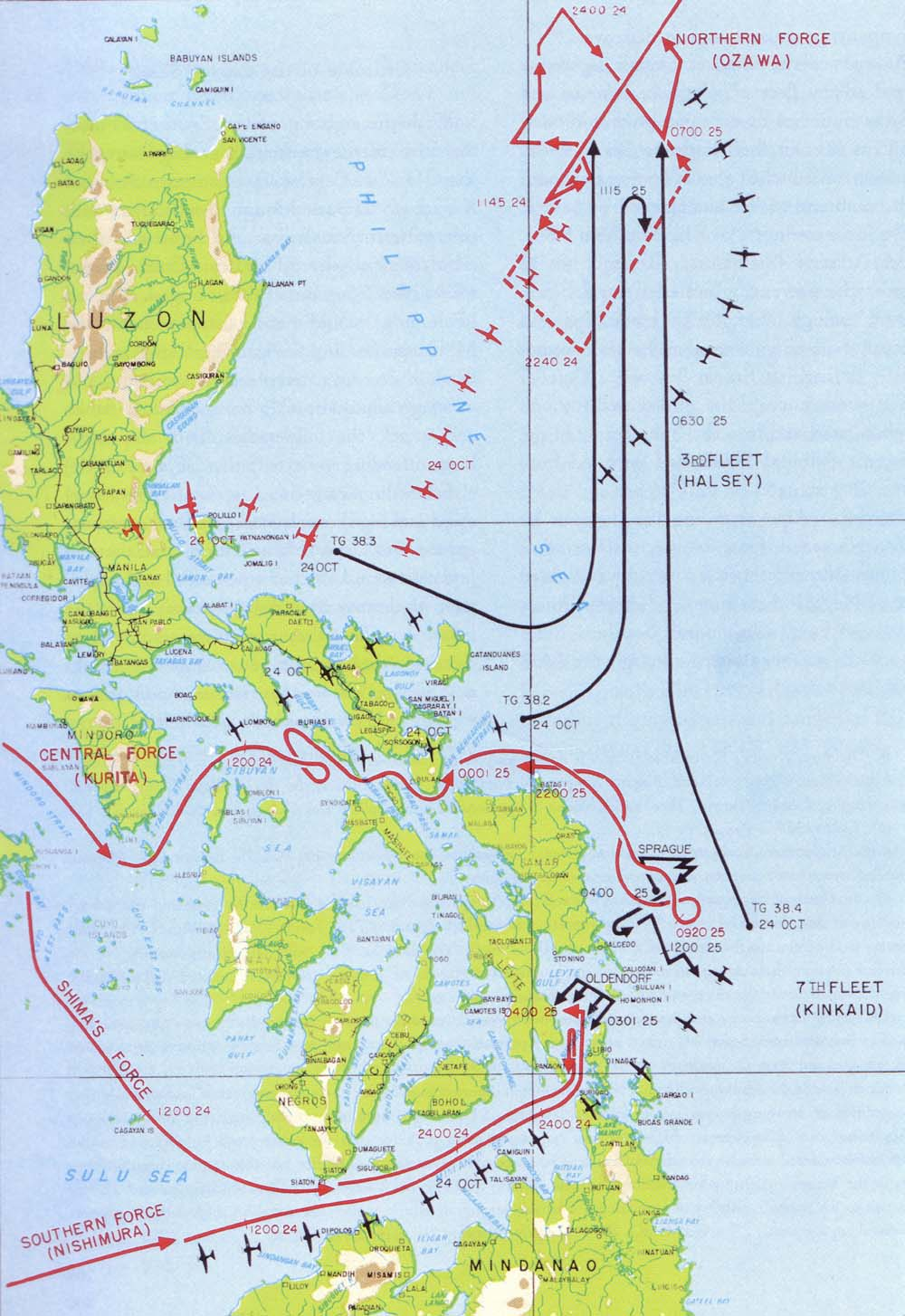
Movements of American forces (in black) and Japanese forces (in red) during the Battle of Leyte Gulf

After the strikes in the Carolines, the fast carrier task force left the area to begin initial raids in the Philippines, with the first strikes occurring from 12 to 14 September. Aircraft from the carriers hit Japanese bases on the islands of Cebu, Leyte, Bohol, and Negros. Another series of strikes, concentrated around the capital of Manila, followed on 21 and 22 September, and in the central Philippines on the 24th. Alabama returned to Saipan on 28 September before proceeding to Ulithi, which was by now a major staging area for the US fleet, on 1 October. Five days later, the fast carrier task force sortied to begin a major raid on the island of Formosa (Taiwan) and other islands to neutralize the airfields there in advance of the invasion of the Philippines. Alabama continued to escort the carriers as part of TG 38.3, providing heavy anti-aircraft support. On 14 October, the fleet turned south to begin raids on Luzon in the Philippines and Alabama engaged aircraft that attempted to attack the fleet. The ship's gunners claimed to have destroyed three Japanese aircraft and damaged another.

===== Battle of Leyte Gulf =====
Alabama supported the landing at Leyte on 15 October before returning to the carrier screen to escort them for another series of air strikes on islands throughout the Philippines on 21 October, by now having been transferred to TG 38.4. The landings on Leyte led to the activation of Operation Shō-Gō 1, the Japanese navy's planned riposte to an Allied landing in the Philippines. The plan was a complicated operation with three separate fleets: the 1st Mobile Fleet, now labeled the Northern Force under Vice Admiral Jisaburō Ozawa, the Center Force under Vice Admiral Takeo Kurita, and the Southern Force under Vice Admiral Shōji Nishimura. Ozawa's carriers, by now depleted of most of their aircraft, were to serve as a decoy for Kurita's and Nishimura's battleships, which were to use the distraction to attack the invasion fleet directly.

Kurita's ships were detected in the San Bernardino Strait on 24 October, and in the ensuing Battle of the Sibuyan Sea, American carrier aircraft sank the powerful battleship Musashi, causing Kurita to temporarily reverse course. This convinced Admiral William F. Halsey, the commander of Third Fleet, to send the fast carrier task force to destroy the 1st Mobile Fleet, which had by then been detected. Alabama steamed north with the carriers, and on the way Halsey established TF 34, consisting of Alabama and five other fast battleships, seven cruisers, and eighteen destroyers, commanded by Vice Admiral Willis Lee. TF 34 was arrayed ahead of the carriers, serving as their screen. On the morning of 25 October, Mitscher began his first attack on the Northern Force, initiating the Battle off Cape Engaño; over the course of six strikes on the Japanese fleet, the Americans sank all four carriers and damaged two old battleships that had been converted into hybrid carriers. Unknown to Halsey and Mitscher, Kurita had resumed his approach through the San Bernardino Strait late on 24 October and passed into Leyte Gulf the next morning. While Mitscher was occupied with the decoy Northern Force, Kurita moved in to attack the invasion fleet; in the Battle off Samar, he was held off by a group of escort carriers, destroyers, and destroyer escorts, TU 77.4.3, known as Taffy 3. Frantic calls for help later that morning led Halsey to detach Lee's battleships to head south and intervene.

However, Halsey waited more than an hour after receiving orders from Admiral Chester W. Nimitz, the Commander, U.S. Pacific Fleet, to detach TF 34; still steaming north during this interval, the delay added two hours to the battleships' voyage south. A need to refuel destroyers further slowed TF 34's progress south. Heavy resistance from Taffy 3 threw Kurita's battleships and cruisers into disarray and led him to break off the attack before Alabama and the rest of TF 34 could arrive. Halsey detached Iowa and New Jersey as TG 34.5 to pursue Kurita through the San Bernardino Strait while Lee took the rest of his ships further southwest to try to cut off his escape, but both groups arrived too late. The historian H. P. Wilmott speculated that had Halsey detached TF 34 promptly and not delayed the battleships by refueling the destroyers, the ships could have easily arrived in the strait ahead of Center Force and, owing to the marked superiority of their radar-directed main guns, destroyed Kurita's ships.

===== Later operations =====
Having failed to intercept the retiring Japanese fleet, Alabama and the rest of TF 34 returned to their positions screening the carriers. On 30 October, the fleet withdrew to Ulithi to replenish ammunition and fuel. On 3 November, the fleet departed for another series of raids on Japanese airfields and other facilities on Luzon as the amphibious force prepared for its next landing on the island of Mindoro in the western Philippines. Over the next few weeks, Alabama cruised with the carriers, protecting them from Japanese aircraft, while the carriers struck targets on Luzon and the Visayas in the central Philippines. The fleet returned to Ulithi once again on 24 November and through early December Alabama was occupied with routine maintenance and training exercises with other vessels in the fleet. During this period, the fleet was reorganized and Alabama was assigned to TG 38.1. The fleet sortied again on 10 December for more strikes on Luzon that lasted from 14 to 16 December; the carriers massed so many aircraft that they could keep Japanese airfields constantly suppressed to prevent them from interfering with the passage of the Mindoro invasion fleet.

On 17 December, the fleet withdrew to refuel at sea, but late in the day, Typhoon Cobra swept through the area, battering the fleet. The storm conditions—Alabama recorded wind gusts as high as 83 knots (154 km/h; 96 mph) and heavy seas that caused her to roll up to thirty degrees—sank three destroyers and inflicted serious damage to several other vessels, though Alabama emerged with only minor damage to her superstructure, and both of her Kingfishers were wrecked. The fleet returned to Ulithi on 24 December and Alabama was detached for an overhaul at the Puget Sound Naval Shipyard. She entered the dry-dock there on 18 January 1945 for work that lasted until 25 February, at which point she was floated out of the dry-dock for further repairs, which were completed on 17 March. The ship then began a series of sea trials and training exercises along the coast of California before departing on 4 April for Pearl Harbor. She arrived there on 10 April, spent a week on additional training exercises, and then proceeded on to Ulithi, arriving there on 28 April.

==== Operations off Japan and the end of the war ====
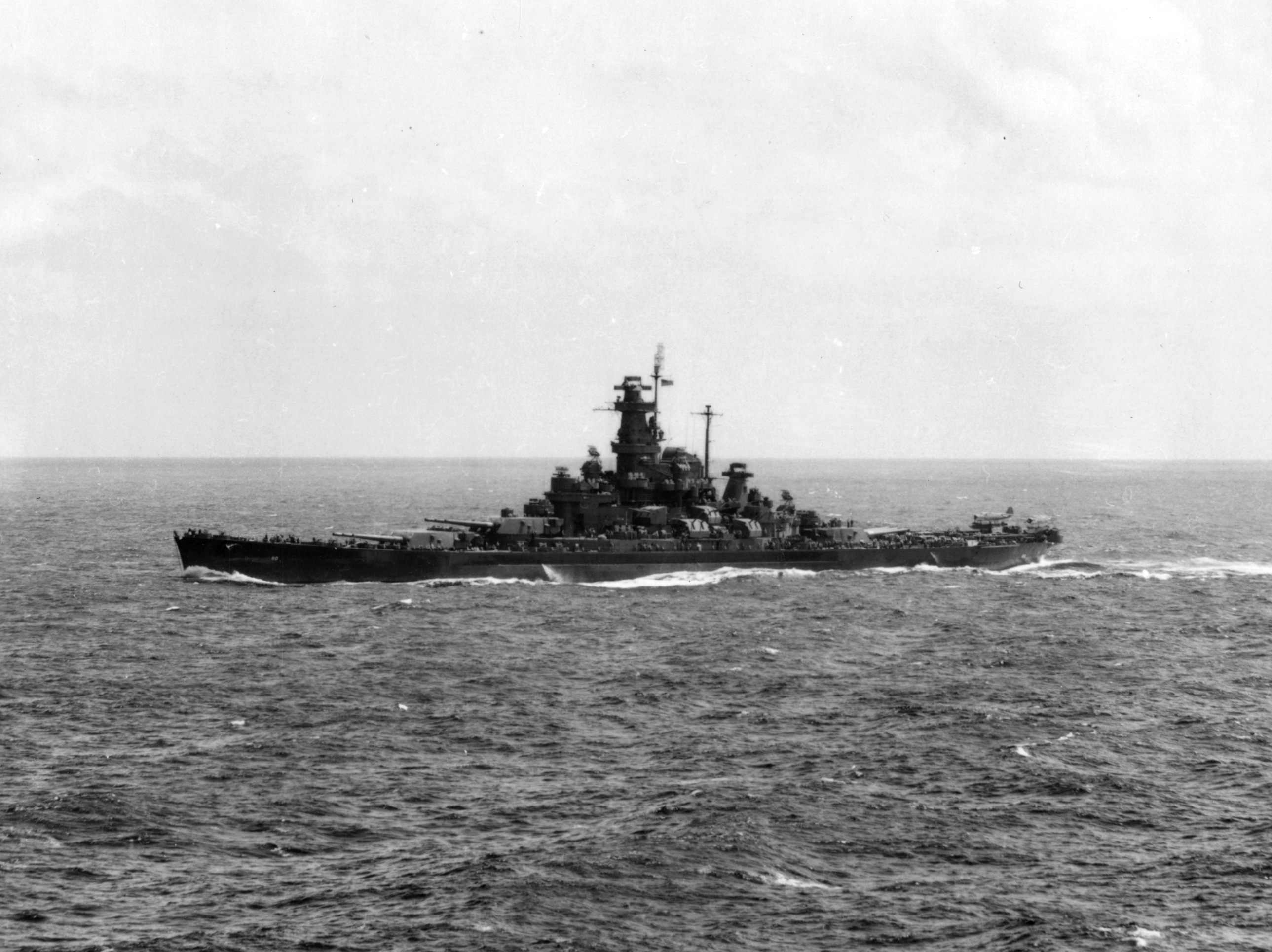
Alabama underway, c. 1944

At Ulithi, Alabama re-joined the fast carrier task force, which had by this point reverted to Fifth Fleet. The fast carrier task force got underway on 9 May to support the forces fighting in the Battle of Okinawa, who had gone ashore on 1 April. The Japanese had massed significant reserves of aircraft for kamikaze strikes against the invasion fleet. During one such attack on 14 May, while approximately 120 miles southeast of the Japanese home island of Kyushu, Alabama shot down two Japanese aircraft and helped to destroy two others, but one kamikaze nevertheless penetrated the fleet's anti-aircraft defenses and struck Enterprise. The operations off Okinawa continued for the next two weeks and on 4–5 June, the fleet was hit by another typhoon and Alabama—part of TG 38.1 at this time—again suffered only superficial damage, though many other vessels in the group were badly damaged. The fleet resumed its normal operations in support of the Okinawa fight on 7 June, including air strikes on Japanese airfields on Kyushu the next day that Alabama supported. With an escort of five destroyers on 9 June, Alabama, Indiana, and Massachusetts steamed to shell Japanese facilities on the island of Minami Daito Jima; they repeated the attack the next day. The fleet thereafter returned to Leyte Gulf to begin preparations for a series of attacks on the Japanese Home Islands.

Third Fleet resumed control of the carrier fleet for these operations, which began on 1 July when the fleet sortied from Leyte Gulf. The carriers conducted wide-ranging attacks on various military and industrial targets throughout Japan, particularly concentrating on the area around Tokyo. On the night of 17–18 July, Alabama, four other American battleships, the British battleship HMS King George V, and a pair of cruisers bombarded six industrial facilities northeast of Tokyo. On 9 August, Alabama shelled targets at Kamaishi in company with two battleships and six American and British cruisers. The same day, Alabama transferred a medical party to the destroyer Ault, which took them to the destroyer Borie, which had been hit by a kamikaze and needed medical assistance. When she received word of the Japanese surrender on 15 August, Alabama was still at sea off the coast of Japan. She contributed sailors and marines to the initial occupation force, and she cruised with the carriers while they used their aircraft to search for prisoner of war camps.

On 5 September, Alabama steamed into Tokyo Bay, where she re-embarked crew-members who had gone ashore. She remained there until 20 September, when she got underway for Okinawa, where she took on 700 men, most of whom were Seabees, to carry them back to the United States as part of Operation Magic Carpet. The ship arrived in San Francisco on 15 October and remained there for the Navy Day celebrations held there on 27 October, where she hosted some 9,000 visitors. Two days later, she steamed to San Pedro, California, where she lay until 27 February 1946, when she got underway for an overhaul at Puget Sound to prepare her for deactivation.

=== Reserve and museum ship ===
- USS Alabama (battleship)
- U.S. National Register of Historic Places
- U.S. National Historic Landmark
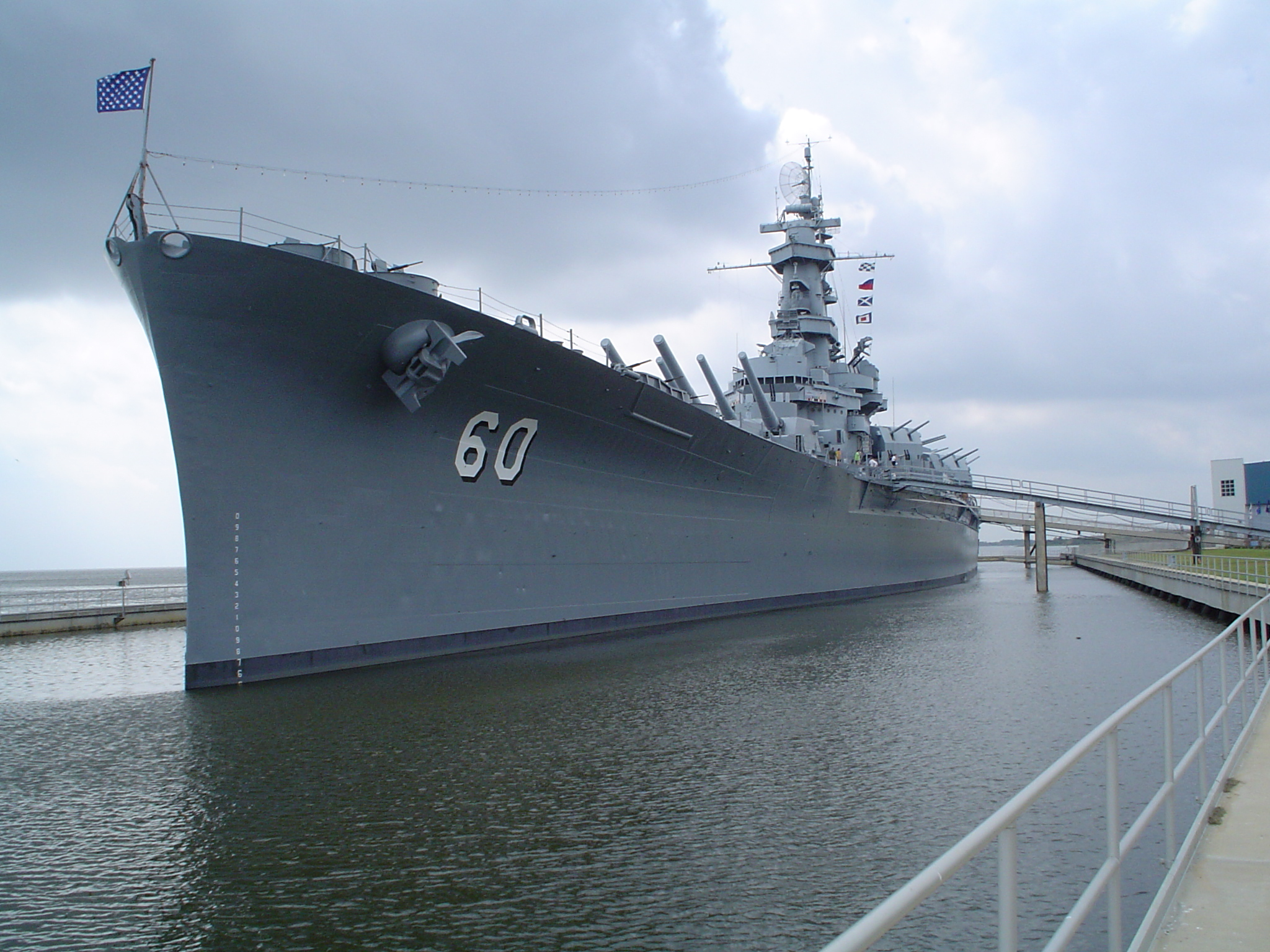
- USS Alabama at permanent berth.
- Built: 1964 for museum
- NRHP reference No.: 86000083

Significant dates
- Added to NRHP: 14 January 1986
- Designated NHL: 14 January 1986

She was decommissioned on 9 January 1947 at the Naval Station in Seattle and assigned to the Pacific Reserve Fleet, stationed in Bremerton, Washington. Plans were drawn up during the period she was in reserve to modernize Alabama and the other ships of her class should they be needed for future active service. In March 1954, a program to equip the four ships with secondary batteries consisting of ten twin 3-inch (76 mm) guns were proposed, but the plan came to nothing. Another plan to convert the ship into a guided missile battleship arose in 1956–1957, but the cost of the conversion proved to be prohibitive. She would have had all three main battery turrets removed and replaced with a twin RIM-8 Talos missile launcher forward, two RIM-24 Tartar launchers aft, anti-submarine weapons, and equipment to handle helicopters. The cost of the project amounted to $120 million.

On 1 June 1962, Alabama was stricken from the Naval Vessel Register for disposal; with the ship slated to be broken up, the state of Alabama passed a bill to establish the "USS Alabama Battleship Commission" with a view toward preserving the battleship as a museum ship. Governor George Wallace signed the law on 12 September 1963, and the commission set about raising funds to acquire the ship; ultimately around $800,000 was raised, of which an eighth came from children in the state, the rest coming primarily from corporate donations.

On 16 June 1964, the Navy awarded the ship to her namesake state, with a provision that the Navy would retain the ability to recall the ship to service in the event of an emergency. Alabama was formally handed over on 7 July during a ceremony in Seattle, and she was then towed to Mobile, Alabama to be restored as a museum, by way of the Panama Canal. On the way to the canal, one of the tugboats accidentally sank. The ship's screws were removed for the voyage to avoid any damage. The carrier Lexington, a veteran of the fast carrier task force and still in service, escorted the ship while she was towed through the Gulf of Mexico. Alabama arrived in Mobile on 14 September having traveled some 5,600 nautical miles (10,400 km; 6,400 mi), the longest tow of a vessel that was not an active warship. The channel in Mobile Bay to her permanent berth had not yet been completed, and she had to wait until the end of the month before dredging work was finished. Once the ship was moored in her berth, work began to prepare the ship for visitors, including sandblasting painted surfaces, applying primer, and then re-painting the entire ship. The museum was opened on 9 January 1965.

In the early 1980s, when the Navy reactivated the four Iowa-class battleships, parts were cannibalized from Alabama and the other preserved battleships, including Massachusetts and North Carolina, to restore the Iowas to service. Engine room components that were no longer available in the Navy's inventory accounted for most of the material removed from the ships. The ship was declared a National Historic Landmark in 1986. During her career as a museum ship, Alabama has been used as a set for several movies including Under Siege in 1992 and USS Indianapolis: Men of Courage in 2016.

In the early 2000s, the museum raised funds to complete major repairs to Alabama, including removing 2.7 million gallons of water contaminated with fuel oil from the ship. This involved erecting a cofferdam around the ship and pumping it dry, which also allowed workers to repair the ship's hull. At the same time, the submarine USS Drum, another component of the museum, was moved from the water to a display on land so her hull could be repaired. Alabama was damaged by Hurricane Katrina in September 2005, taking on water and a list to port; repairs were effected by Volkert, Inc.

Gallery
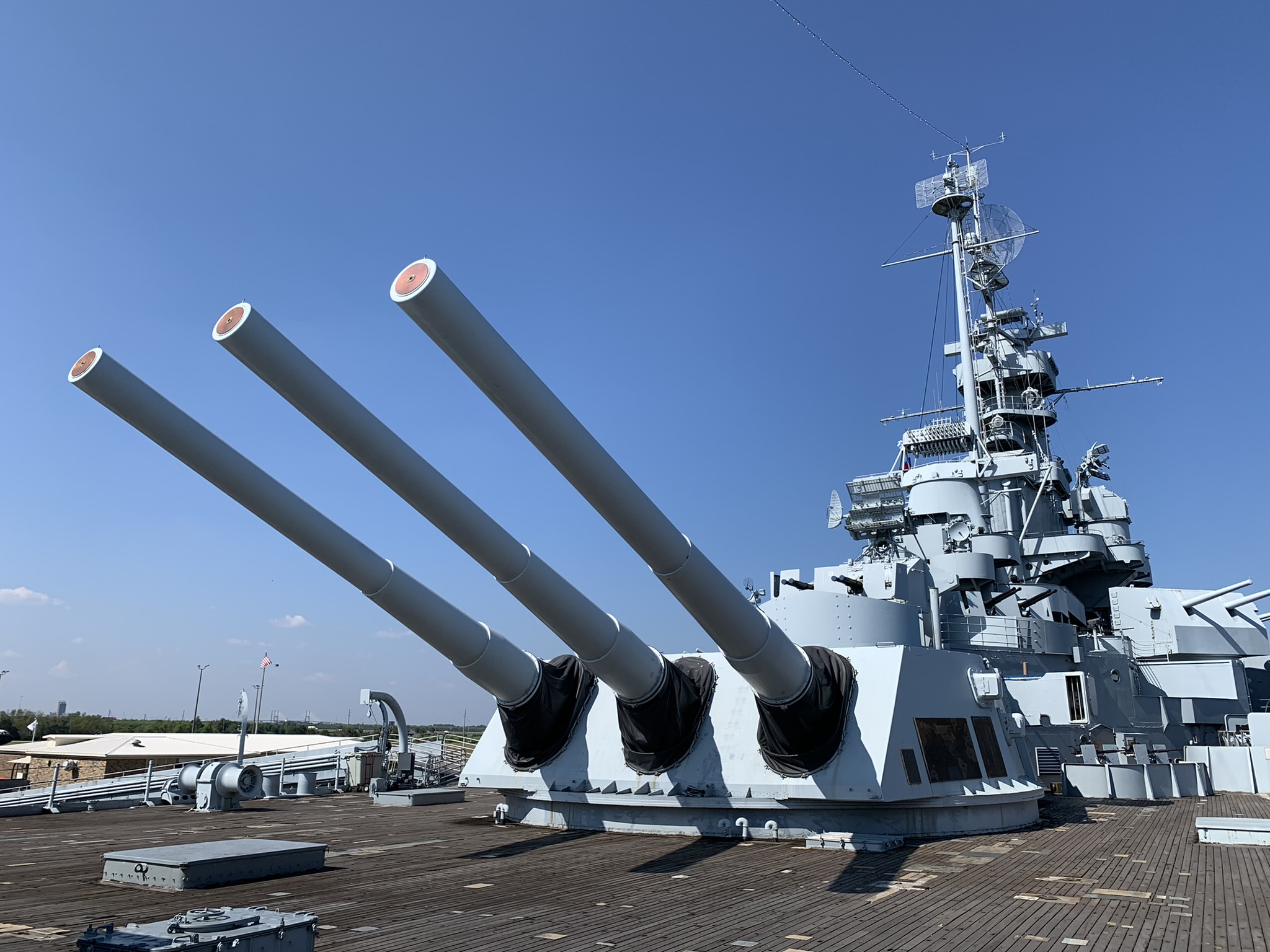
16 inch rear gun turret

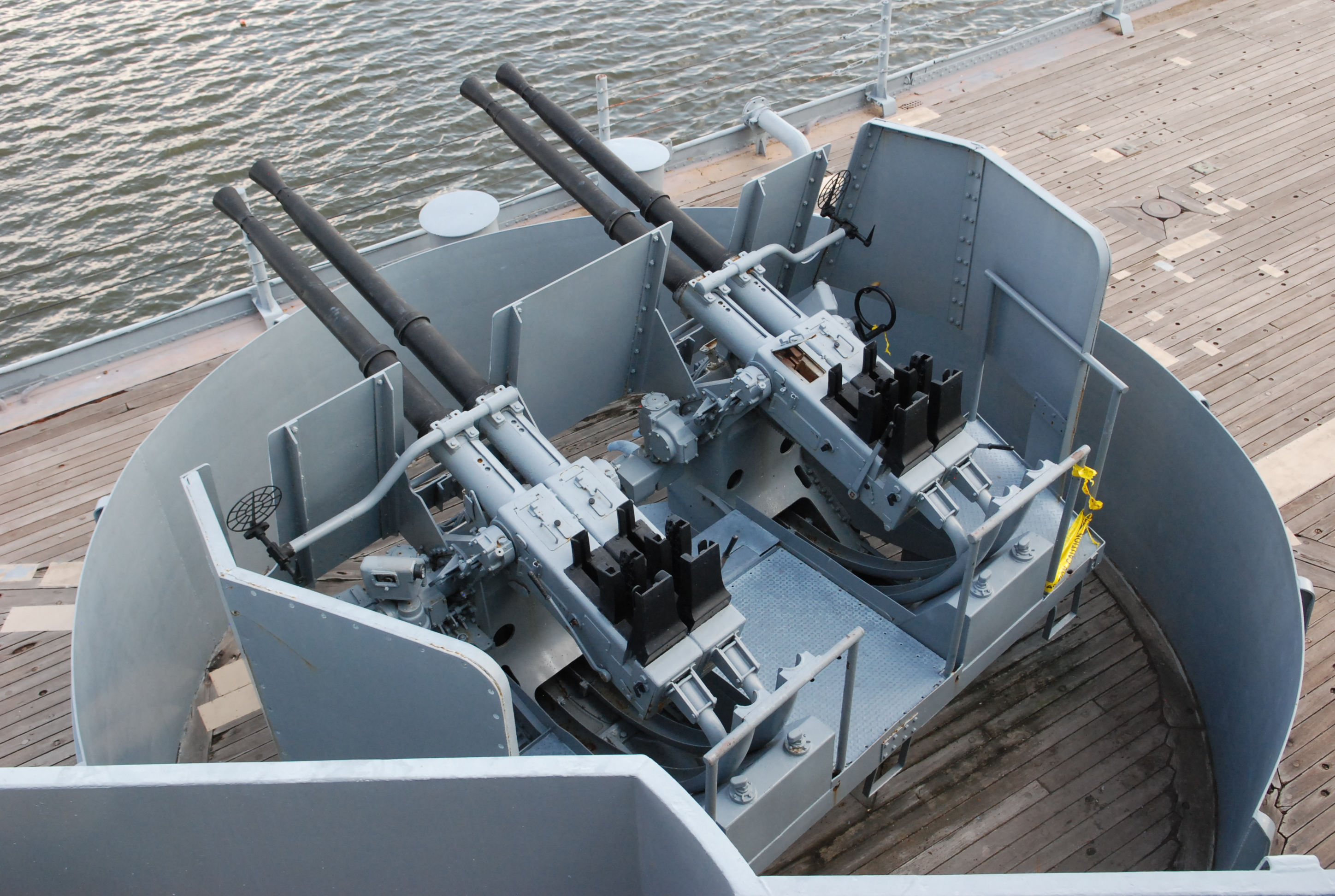
40mm Quadruple AA guns

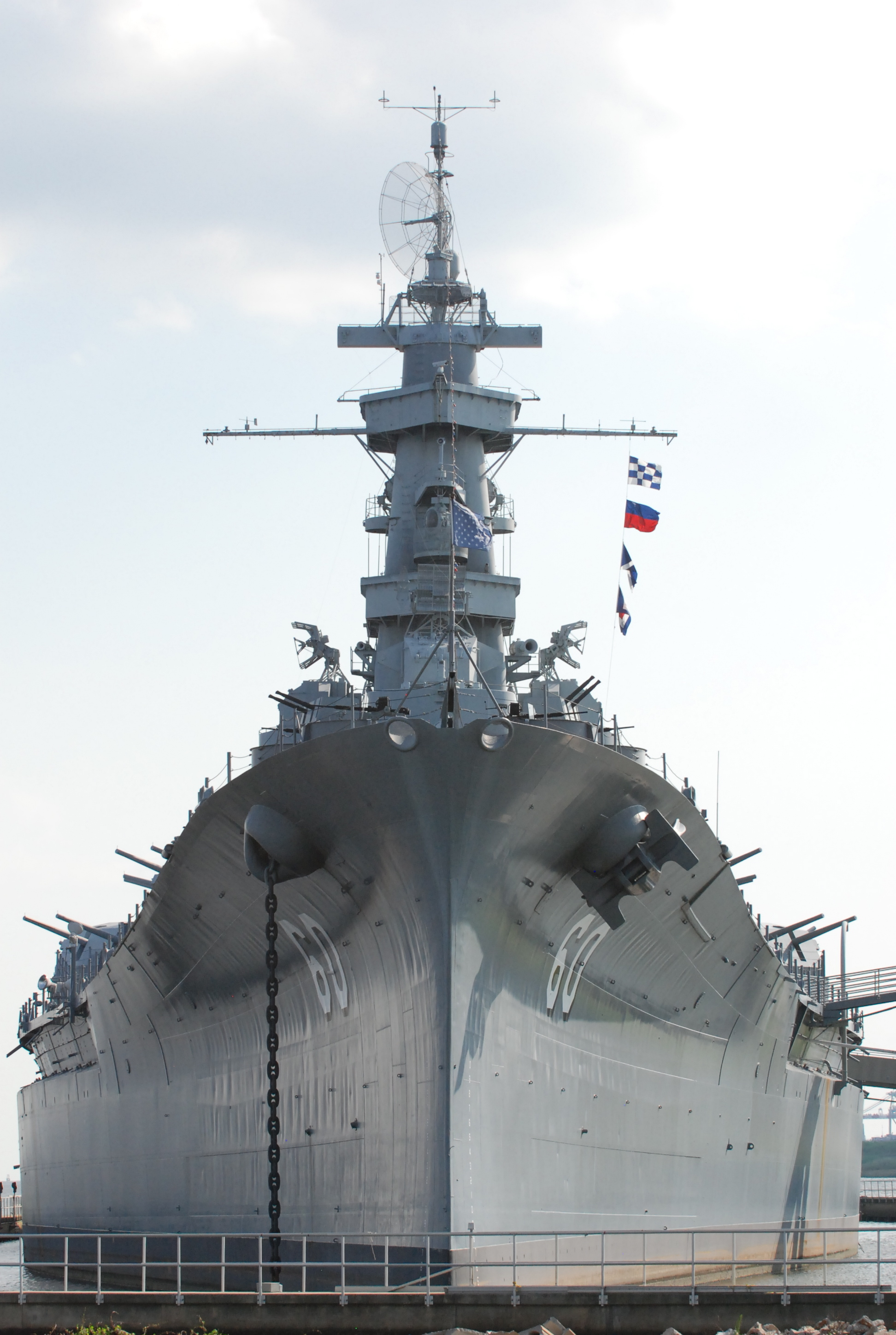
Alabama front

== See also ==
- List of National Historic Landmarks in Alabama
- List of museum ships
