= Riverview =

Riverview may refer to:

== Places ==
=== Australia ===
- Riverview, New South Wales, a suburb of Sydney
- Riverview, Queensland, a suburb of Ipswich

=== Canada ===
- Riverview, Alberta
- Riverview, Edmonton, Alberta
- Riverview, New Brunswick
  - Riverview (electoral district), New Brunswick
- Riverview, Ottawa, Ontario
- Riverview, St. Catharines, Ontario
- Riverview Hospital (Coquitlam), Coquitlam, British Columbia

=== United States ===
- Riverview, Alabama, a community
- Riverview, Arkansas, a place in Arkansas
- Riverview Lake, Mesa, Arizona
- Riverview, Colorado, a place in Colorado
- Riverview, Delaware
- Riverview, Florida
- Riverview, Indiana
- Riverview, Kentucky (disambiguation)
- Riverview, Maryland (disambiguation)
- Riverview, Newaygo County, Michigan
- Riverview, Michigan, in Wayne County
- Riverview, Mississippi
- Riverview, Missouri (disambiguation)
- Riverview Colony, Montana, a Hutterite community
- Riverview, Nebraska
- Riverview, New York, a place in New York
- Riverview, North Carolina
- Riverview, Ohio
- Riverview, Oregon (disambiguation)
- Riverview, South Carolina
- Riverview (Clarksville, Tennessee), listed on the NRHP in Montgomery County
- Riverview, Virginia (disambiguation)
- Fort Riverview, Virginia, originally a Confederate redoubt, now a historic archaeological site
- Riverview, Wisconsin, a town
- Riverview (community), Wisconsin, an unincorporated community in the town of Superior
- Riverview, Wyoming

== Buildings ==
=== Houses ===
- Riverview House, West Ryde, New South Wales, Australia
- Riverview (Gatineau), a manor house in Quebec, Canada
- Riverview at Hobson Grove, a historic home in Kentucky, U.S.
- Riverview House (Vassalboro, Maine), U.S., a historic home
- Riverview, another name for Charles McLaran House, a mansion in Mississippi, U.S.
- Riverview (Port Royal, Virginia), a historic home in the U.S.
- Riverview (Williamsburg, Virginia), a historic home in the U.S.

=== Towers ===
- Riverview, a former name of the Tower on the Maumee, a skyscraper in Toledo, Ohio, U.S.
- Affinity Living Riverview, a residential tower in Manchester, United Kingdom
- Riverview Plaza, a skyscraper in Wuhan, China

=== Other buildings ===
- Riverview (St. Cloud State University), Minnesota, U.S.

== Other uses ==
- Riverview Airport, Michigan, U.S.
- Riverview Branch Library, Saint Paul, Minnesota, U.S.
- Riverview Church, a megachurch in Perth, Australia
- Riverview Correctional Facility, New York State, U.S.
- Riverview Corridor, a transit corridor in the Minneapolis–Saint Paul metropolitan area, U.S.
- Riverview Covered Bridge, Ohio, U.S.
- Riverview Dam, on the Chattahoochee River between Alberta and Georgia, U.S.
- Riverview High School (disambiguation)
- Riverview Hotel (disambiguation)
- Riverview League, a baseball league in Minnesota, U.S.
- Riverview Park & Zoo, Peterborough, Canada
- Riverview Park (Chicago), an amusement park in Chicago, Illinois, 1904 to 1967
- Riverview Speedway, a former name of the Murray Bridge Speedway in South Australia
- Riverview Stadium, a former name of the NelsonCorp Field baseball stadium in Iowa, U.S.
- Riverview Theater, a cinema in Minneapolis, U.S.
- RiverView Theater (Shreveport, Louisiana), a performing arts centre in the U.S.
- Mesa Riverview, a shopping centre in Phoenix, Arizona, U.S.
- Riverview, a downloadable world for The Sims 3 video game

== See also ==
- Riverview Apartments (disambiguation)
- Riverview Cemetery (disambiguation)
- Riverview Historic District (disambiguation)
- Riverview Hospital (disambiguation)
- Riverview Mounds Archaeological Site, Tennessee, U.S.
- Riverview Park (disambiguation)
