= Riverview House =

Riverview House is the name of the following houses:

- Riverview House, West Ryde, New South Wales, Australia, on the New South Wales State Heritage Register
- Riverview House (Vassalboro, Maine), United States, on the National Register of Historic Places

== See also ==
- Riverview (Gatineau), a manor house in Quebec, Canada
- Riverview at Hobson Grove, Kentucky, United States, a home on the National Register of Historic Places
- Riverview, another name for Charles McLaran House, Mississippi, United States, a mansion on the National Register of Historic Places
- Riverview (Port Royal, Virginia), United States, a home on the National Register of Historic Places
- Riverview (Williamsburg, Virginia), United States, a home on the National Register of Historic Places
