= Riverview Historic District =

Riverview Historic District may refer to:

in the United States

(by state)

- Riverview Historic District (Selma, Alabama), listed on the NRHP in Alabama
- Riverview Historic District (Valley, Alabama), listed on the NRHP in Alabama and Georgia
- Old Riverview Historic District, Capitola, CA, listed on the NRHP in California
- Riverview Historic District (Kankakee, Illinois), listed on the NRHP in Illinois
- Riverview Historic District (Tulsa, Oklahoma), listed on the NRHP in Oklahoma
- Riverview Historic District (Norfolk, Virginia), listed on the NRHP in Virginia
- Riverview Historic District (Miami, Florida), designated by the city of Miami, Florida.

== See also ==
- Riverview (disambiguation)
- Riverview Apartments (disambiguation)
- Riverview Park Plat Historic District, Des Moines, IA, listed on the NRHP in Iowa
- Riverview Terrace Historic District, Davenport, IA, listed on the NRHP in Iowa
