= Riverview, Virginia =

Riverview, Virginia may refer to:

- Riverview, Wise County, Virginia
- Riverview, Norfolk, Virginia, a neighborhood of Norfolk
- Riverview (Norfolk, Virginia), listed on the NRHP in Virginia
- Riverview (Port Royal, Virginia), listed on the NRHP in Virginia
- Riverview (Williamsburg, Virginia), listed on the NRHP in Virginia

== See also ==
- Riverview Landing, Virginia, an unincorporated community in King William County, Virginia
- Riverview Farm Park, a municipal park located in Newport News, Virginia
