= Riverside Park =

Riverside Park may refer to:

== Inhabited places ==
- Riverside Park, Alberta, Canada
- Riverside Park, Ottawa, Canada
- Riverside Park, California, United States

== Parks ==
=== Canada ===
- Riverside Park (Kamloops), British Columbia
- Riverside Park (Guelph), Ontario
- Riverside Park, Montreal, Quebec

=== United Kingdom ===
- Riverside Park, Guildford, Surrey, England
- Riverside Country Park, Kent, England
- Riverside Park, Glenrothes, Fife, Scotland
- Riverside Park, Southampton. Southampton, England

=== United States ===
- Riverside Park (Jacksonville), Florida
- Riverside Park, Vero Beach, Florida
- Riverside Park (Indianapolis), Indiana
- Riverside Park, Oswego, Kansas, a National Register of Historic Places listing in Labette County, Kansas
- Riverside Park, Wichita, Kansas
- Riverside Park (Baltimore), Maryland
- Riverside Park, Cumberland, Maryland, current site of the oldest Headquarters of George Washington
- Riverside Park, site of the Riverside Park Dance Pavilion in Merrick county, Nebraska
- Riverside Park (Red Bank, New Jersey)
- Riverside Park (Buffalo, New York)
- Riverside Park (Manhattan), New York City, New York
- Riverside State Park, Nine Mile Falls, Washington
- Riverside Park (La Crosse), Wisconsin
- Riverside Park, Milwaukee, Wisconsin
- Riverside Park (Pittsville, Wisconsin)

== Amusement parks ==
- Riverside Motorsports Park, a proposed motorsports-themed entertainment park in Merced County, California, US
- Riverside Park (Massachusetts), former name of the amusement park Six Flags New England, US

== Sports venues ==
=== Jamaica ===
- Riverside Park, Clarendon, home ground of Sporting Central Academy F.C.

=== United Kingdom ===
- Riverside Park, Jedburgh, Scotland, home ground of Jed-Forest RFC

=== United States ===
- Riverside Park (Arizona), a baseball park in Phoenix
- Riverside Park, Dawson Springs, Kentucky, a baseball park
- Riverside Park (stadium), a former baseball park in Buffalo, New York
- Riverside Park (Greenbush), a former baseball park in Greenbush (now Rensselaer), New York
- Riverside Park (Austin), a former baseball park in Texas
- Riverside Park (Dallas), a former baseball park in Texas

== See also ==
- Riverfront Park (disambiguation)
- Riverside Amusement Park (disambiguation)
- Riverside Stadium, a football stadium in Middlesbrough, England
- Riverview Park (disambiguation)
