= List of neighborhoods in Norfolk, Virginia =

The following is a list of neighborhoods located in the city of Norfolk, Virginia, United States.

== Neighborhoods ==
- Ballentine
- Barraud Park
- Bayview
- Berkley
- Broad Creek/Bowling Green/Roberts Village
- Calvert Square
- Chesterfield Heights
- Colonial Place
- Coleman Place
- Cottage Road Park
- Crown Point
- Diggs Park
- Downtown Norfolk
- East Ocean View
- Elizabeth Park
- Estabrook
- Fairmount Park Neighborhood
- Fort Norfolk
- Freemason District
- Ghent
- Greenhill Farms
- Highland Park
- Huntersville, also called Hunters Village or Olde Huntersville
- Ingleside
- Kensington
- Larchmont-Edgewater
- Lafayette / Winona
- Lafayette Shores
- Lakewood
- Lamberts Point
- Larrymore Lawns
- Lindenwood
- Lochhaven
- Meadowbrook
- North Ghent
- Northside
- Norview
- Ocean View
- Park Place
- Pinewell
- Poplar Halls
- Riverpoint
- Riverview
- Sewell's Point
- Sewell's Garden
- Shoop Park
- South Bayview
- Talbot Park
- Tidewater Park
- Titustown
- Villa Heights
- Wards Corner
- West Freemason
- West Ocean View
- Willoughby Spit
- Young Terrace

== Historic Districts in Norfolk ==
Many of Norfolk's neighborhoods, buildings, and landmarks have notable national and local historic significance. The city has four locally designated historic districts: Ghent, Downtown, West Freemason, East Freemason, and Hodges House (consisting of a single structure). Norfolk also has fifteen districts recognized on the National Register of Historic Places.
