= Riverview Middle School =

See also Riverview (disambiguation).

Riverview Middle School may refer to several different schools:

== Canada ==
- Riverview Middle School in Devon, Alberta
- Riverview Middle School - in Riverview, New Brunswick

== United States ==
- Riverview Middle School in Bay Point, California
- Riverview Middle School In Rio Vista, California
- Riverview Middle School in Dawsonville, Georgia
- Riverview Middle School in Plymouth, Wisconsin
