= Riverview, Kentucky =

Riverview, Kentucky, may refer to:

- Russell, Kentucky, in Greenup Co., formerly known as Riverview
- Riverview, McCracken County, Kentucky
- Riverview (Bowling Green, Kentucky), listed on the NRHP in Kentucky

== See also ==
- Riverview (disambiguation)
