= Riverfront Park =

Riverfront Park may refer to:

- Newark Riverfront Park, a park in Newark, New Jersey
- Riverfront Park (Salem, Oregon)
- Riverfront Park (Harrisburg), a park in Harrisburg, Pennsylvania
- Allegheny Riverfront Park, a park in Pittsburgh, Pennsylvania
- North Shore Riverfront Park, a park in Pittsburgh, Pennsylvania
- Riverfront Park, in North Charleston, South Carolina
- Riverfront Park (Spokane, Washington)

== See also ==
- Riverfront Stadium
- Riverside Amusement Park (disambiguation)
- Riverside Park (disambiguation)
