= Riverside Amusement Park =

Riverside Amusement Park may refer to:

- Riverside Amusement Park (Massachusetts), former name (1840–2000) of Six Flags New England in Agawam, Massachusetts
- Riverside Amusement Park (Austin), Texas
- Riverside Amusement Park (Binghamton), New York
- Riverside Amusement Park (Chicago), Illinois
- Riverside Amusement Park (Estes Park), Colorado (1923–1970)
- Riverside Amusement Park (Hutchinson), Kansas (1908–early 1930s)
- Riverside Amusement Park (Indianapolis), Indiana (1903–1970)
- Riverside Amusement Park (Joplin), Missouri
- Riverside Amusement Park (La Crosse), Wisconsin (1990–present)
- Riverside Amusement Park (Louisville), Kentucky
- Riverside Amusement Park (Medicine Hat), Alberta
- Riverside Amusement Park (Phoenix), Arizona
- Riverside Amusement Park (Stourport-on-Severn), Worcestershire (2000–present)

== See also ==
- Riverside Park (disambiguation)
- Riverview Park (disambiguation)
