= Riverview Park =

Riverview Park may refer to:

== Parks ==
- Riverview Park (Eau Claire, Wisconsin), public park
- Riverview Park (Hannibal, Missouri), public park
- Riverview Park (Pittsburgh), Pennsylvania, public park
- Riverview Park (San Jose), California, public park

== Amusement parks ==
- Riverview Park (Baltimore), a former Maryland amusement park
- Riverview Park (Chicago), a former Illinois amusement park
- Riverview Park (Detroit), Michigan, an alternative name for Electric Park, a former amusement park
- Riverview Park & Zoo, in Peterborough, Ontario, Canada
- Riverview Park (Iowa), a former amusement park in Des Moines, Iowa

== Neighborhoods and places ==
- Riverview Park, Pennsylvania, census-designated place in Berks County
- Riverview Park Plat Historic District, Des Moines, Iowa
- Riverview, Ottawa, Canada, a neighborhood also known as Riverview Park

== See also ==
- Riverview (disambiguation)
