= Red River Zoo =

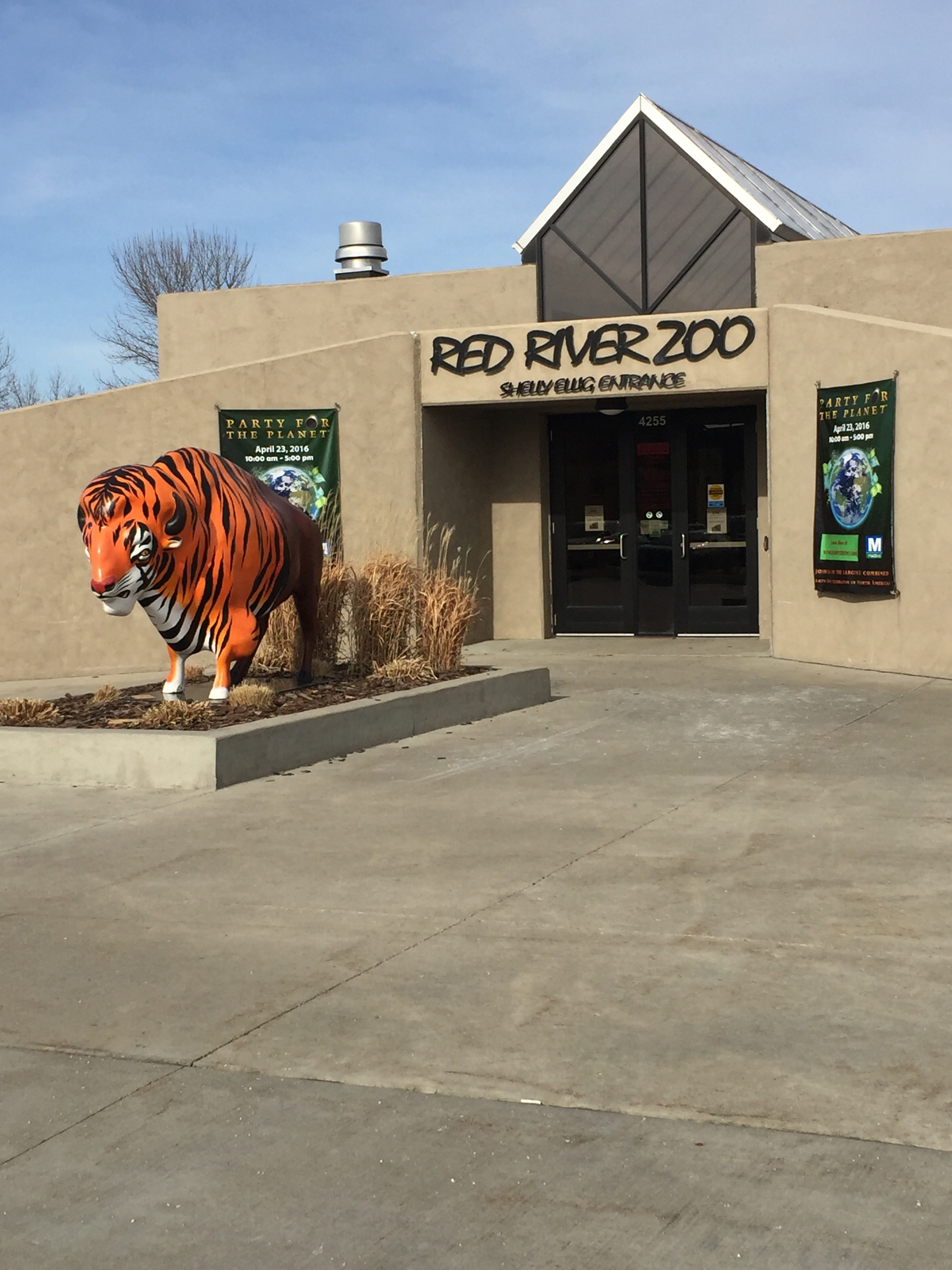
- Interactive map of Red River Zoo
- 46.8462°N 96.8531°W
- Date opened: 1999
- Location: Fargo, North Dakota, United States
- Land area: 33 acres (13 ha)
- No. of species: 85
- Memberships: AZA
- Public transit: MATBUS
- Website: www.redriverzoo.org

The Red River Zoo is a zoo in Fargo, North Dakota. The zoo's first 8 acres (3.2 ha) opened in the spring of 1999. It gained accreditation from the Association of Zoos and Aquariums (AZA) in 2006.

== History ==
The zoo currently sits on 33 acres (13 ha) that was once a farm owned by the George Anderson family, also known as Red River Ranch. Some of the farm buildings were renovated and are used today by the zoo, while others were removed because they were unsafe. Although the original property was flat and had only seven trees, hundreds of additional trees and shrubs were planted and a series of five ponds created to landscape the area.

== Animals ==
The award-winning Red River Zoo is home to over 600 animals representing 89 species, including red pandas. It also includes a 1928 carousel that was fully restored in 1995 and donated to the zoo by the Diederich family. The zoo features a gray wolf exhibit featuring a family of six wolves. They can be viewed from outside or inside a "trapper's cabin" that has two large viewing windows to observe the wolf family. In 2013, the North American River Otter exhibit opened, featuring an indoor and underwater viewing area.

The zoo specializes in breeding and exhibiting some of the world's rarest cold climate species, having successfully bred red pandas (11 births as of 2012, including two sets of triplets), Sichuan takin, Pallas's cats, and Russian Red Tree Squirrels.

== The Red River Zoological Society ==
The Red River Zoo receives no public funds and depends on memberships, admissions, donations, and grants to the Red River Zoological Society and by its members. The Society was formed in 1993.
