= Peoria Zoo =

- Peoria Zoo logo

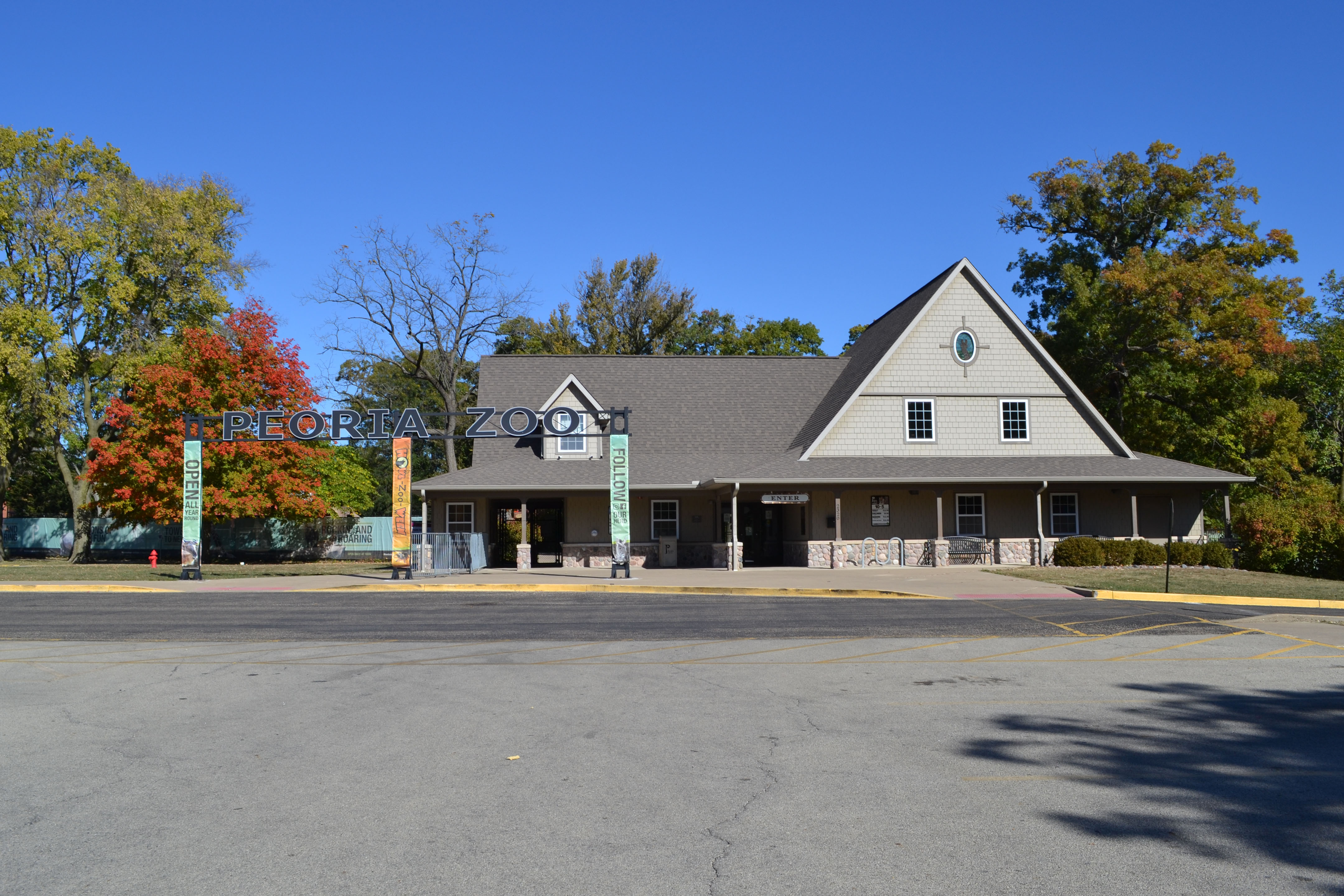
- Peoria Zoo entrance, 2024
- Interactive map of Peoria Zoo
- 40.715477°N 89.574194°W
- Date opened: 1955
- Location: Peoria, Illinois
- Land area: 14 acres (5.7 ha)
- No. of animals: 232
- No. of species: >100
- Memberships: AZA
- Public transit: CityLink
- Website: www.peoriazoo.org

The Peoria Zoo (formerly Glen Oak Zoo) is a zoo located in Peoria, Illinois, in the United States. The zoo is owned and operated by the Peoria Park District and is open daily except Thanksgiving, Christmas Eve, Christmas Day, New Year's Eve, and New Year's Day.

The Peoria Zoo has been accredited by the Association of Zoos and Aquariums since 1976.

== History ==
Glen Oak Zoo was founded in the late 1800s. A herd of elk was donated to the Peoria Park District. Glen Oak Zoo's dedication took place in 1897.

In 1955, the zoo sought to expand its offerings. Marlin Perkins, Director of the St. Louis Zoo and star of Mutual of Omaha's Wild Kingdom gave advice. The Tropics building was constructed in 1955.

Friends of Glen Oak Zoo was formed in 1970.

In 1997, the Peoria Zoological Society was formed.

In 2009, the zoo opened the new Africa exhibit, nearly doubling its size. At the same time it changed its name to "Peoria Zoo."

June 2024 marked the retirement of director Yvonne Strode, who served as the zoo's director since 2005. Max Lakes is the current director.

== Exhibits ==
=== Africa ===
The Africa exhibit opened in 2009 after more than a decade of planning and two and a half years of construction. In this exhibit, the visitors walk around the main area on a boardwalk, and can see across the entire expanse of the enclosure. The main area is divided into two sections, the northern section containing giraffes and gazelles, and the southern section being home to zebras and rhinos. Lions have their own enclosure, as do the mandrills. red river hogs and colobus monkeys share a home, and the African crested porcupines and Aldabra giant tortoise also live together.

The zoo's adult female Amur (Siberian) tiger, Kyra, mother of four cubs (two males—whose conservation plan called for them to eventually be relocated to other zoos—and two females), died suddenly on the evening of Sunday, August 18, 2013, of what preliminary was believed to be a serious acute infection that turned septic. Kyra's mate Vaska, the male tiger, died in December 2016 at age 16. Their two female cubs, Nikita and Sasha, still live at Peoria Zoo. Their two male cubs, Maxim and Luka, moved to the Indianapolis Zoo.

On November 3, 2023, the zoo announced its 18-year-old male lion Arthur had been humanely euthanized due to lymphoma. Arthur was born on September 9, 2005, and moved to Peoria Zoo on November 16, 2008, where he lived with his mate Lizzy. Arthur and Lizzy were the original lions at the Africa exhibit. The pair had four cubs in December 2015, who were moved to other zoos as part of the Species Survival Plan. Female offpsring Nia, Zuri, and Kali moved to Audubon Zoo in New Orleans in March 2019.

On May 1, 2024, the zoo's male giraffe, Taji, was humanely euthanized after a broken foot. The male giraffe was one of the original animals at the Africa exhibit in July 2007. He weighed over 2,300 pounds and lived to be almost 17 years old, surpassing the median life expectancy in captivity of 13.4 years. Taji and his mate Vivian had two offspring, Finley in 2016 who lives at Lincoln Park Zoo, and Zara in 2018 who was transferred to Detroit Zoo. In May 2025, a one-year-old giraffe named Fitzniklas (Fitz for short) was transferred from Memphis Zoo.

On March 3, 2025, the zoo acquired a juvenile Grevy’s zebra (born July 3, 2020) from White Oak Conservation Center in Florida.

A small animal building houses smaller animals such as the zebra mouse, Zambian mole-rats, pancake tortoises, dung beetles, Madagascar hissing cockroaches, African rock pythons, Madagascar tree boas, and Taveta golden weavers.

=== Australia Walkabout ===
An exhibit that opened in 2012, home to a walkthrough exhibit for Bennett's wallabies and Parma wallabies, black swans and Emus and an aviary for Budgerigars.

=== Asian Trail ===
The smallest exhibit in the zoo, with three exhibits for Siberian tigers, Sichuan takins, and Reeves's Muntjacs.

=== Tropics Building ===
Due to feedback from the Association of Zoo and Aquariums, the zoo is planning an estimated $5 million renovation of this facility. More animals would have outdoor enclosures, such as Butch, the zoo's 50 year-old spider monkey. The Tropics building used to house lions, tigers and jaguars, but they have moved to outdoor enclosures.

The Tropics Building houses many species, including: greater spear-nosed bat, western hognose snake, Dumeril's ground boa, Mexican beaded lizard, desert blond tarantula, green tree python, New Caledonian giant gecko, Burmese python, red-footed tortoise, Standing's day gecko, cotton-top tamarin, Hoffman's two-toed sloth, mongoose lemur, northern tree shrew, ring-tailed lemur, cardinal tetra, firehead tetra, southern three-banded armadillo, and black-handed spider monkey.

=== Conservation Center ===
The Conservation Center is a building for endangered species, mostly reptiles and amphibians such as: alligator snapping turtle, Colorado River toad, green and black poison dart frog, prehensile-tailed skink, Panamanian golden frog, Chinese alligator, and spotted turtle.

=== Contact Barn ===
The Contact Barn is home to domestic donkeys, Nigerian dwarf goats, and koi.

== Other facilities ==
=== Glen Oak Pavilion ===
The Glen Oak Pavilion building was designed by local architects William Reeves and John Baille. Construction was completed in 1896 for a total cost of about $25,000. The Victorian-style structure formerly served as a public shelter, an ice cream parlor and a dance hall. The Pavilion served as the Park District's first multipurpose building. Since 2015 it has been the home of the Peoria PlayHouse Children's Museum.

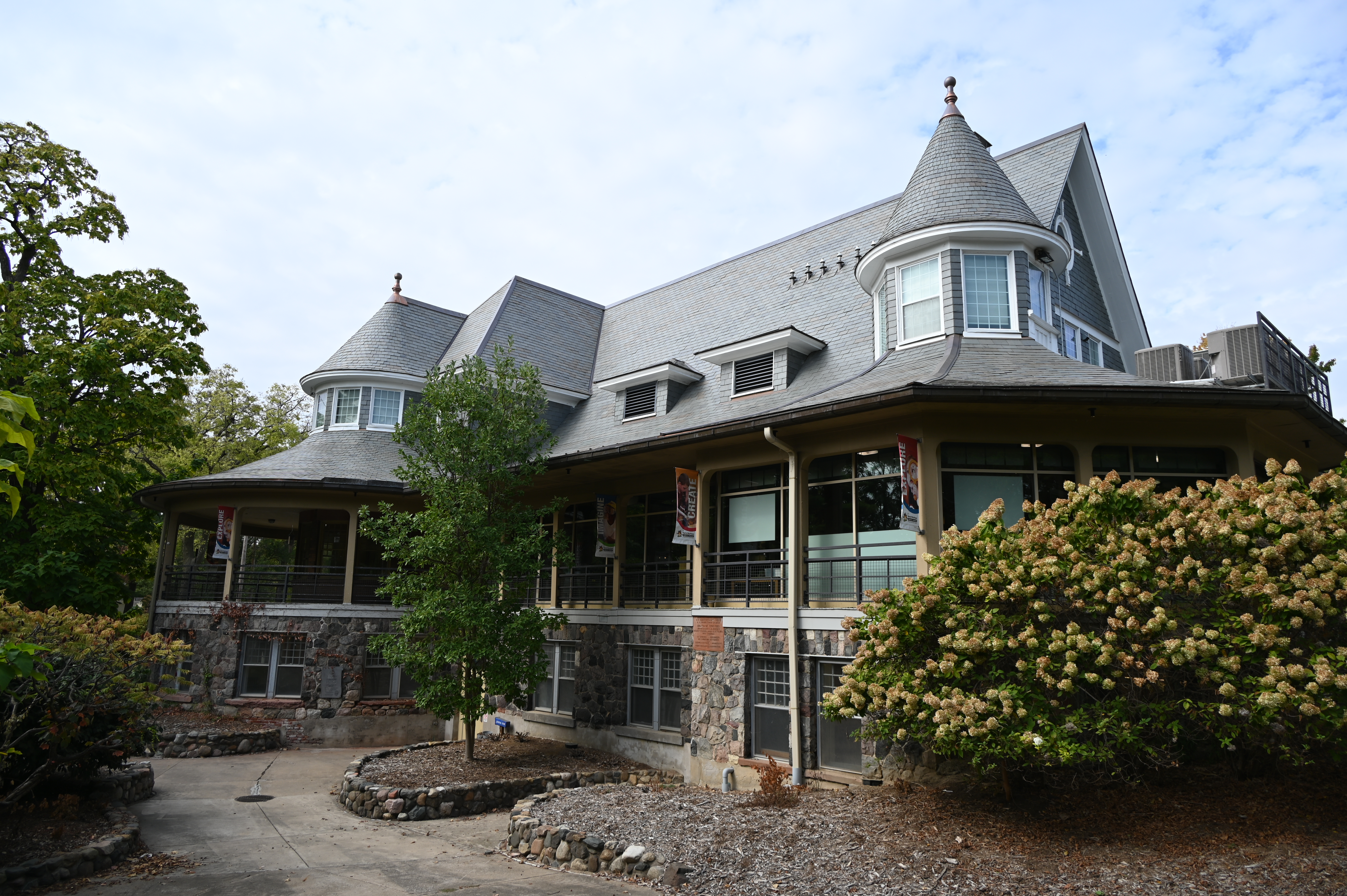
The Peoria PlayHouse Children's Museum, 2024

=== Zambezi River Lodge ===
The Zambezi River Lodge overlooks the Africa exhibit. The facility provides concessions and is also available for receptions and conferences.
