= Riverview Hospital =

Riverview Hospital may refer to:

- Riverview Hospital (Coquitlam), a mental health facility in Coquitlam, British Columbia
- Riverview Hospital (Red Bank), a hospital in Monmouth County, New Jersey
- Riverview Hospital (Noblesville), in Noblesville, Indiana
- Riverview Psychiatric Center, in Augusta, Maine

== See also ==
- Riverview (disambiguation)
