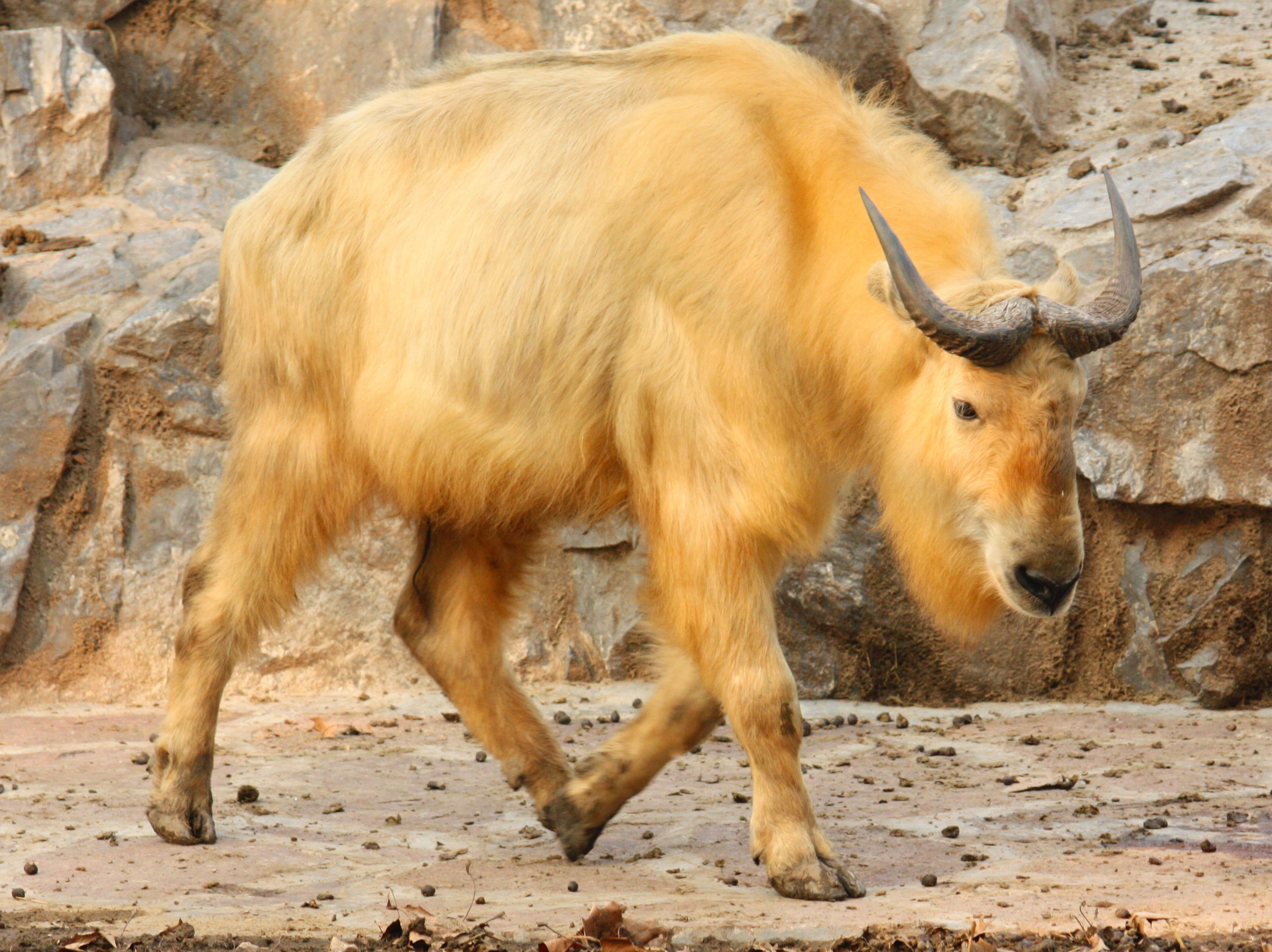
- Takin (Budorcas taxicolor)

Scientific classification
- Kingdom: Animalia
- Phylum: Chordata
- Class: Mammalia
- Order: Artiodactyla
- Family: Bovidae
- Subfamily: Caprinae
- Tribe: Caprini
- Genus: Budorcas; Hodgson, 1850

Type species
- Budorcas taxicolor Hodgson, 1850

Species
- Budorcas taxicolor; Budorcas tibetana; †Budorcas churcheri; †Budorcas teilhardi

= Budorcas =

Budorcas Temporal range: Pliocene - Recent

Genus of mammals

Budorcas is a genus of bovid that contains two living species. Two extinct species are known from the Pliocene, B. teilhardi from China and B. churcheri from Ethiopia. The presence of the genus in Africa indicates that it was far more widespread in the past.

== Etymology ==
Budorcas comes from Ancient Greek: βοῦς, romanized: bous, lit. 'ox, cow' and δορκάς, dorkas, 'gazelle'.
