= Budorcas churcheri =

Budorcas churcheri Temporal range: Pliocene

Scientific classification
- Domain: Eukaryota
- Kingdom: Animalia
- Phylum: Chordata
- Class: Mammalia
- Order: Artiodactyla
- Family: Bovidae
- Subfamily: Caprinae
- Tribe: Caprini
- Genus: Budorcas
- Species: †B. churcheri

Binomial name
- †Budorcas churcheri Gentry, 1996

Species of mammal

Budorcas churcheri is an extinct species of takin that lived in the Pliocene of Ethiopia. Its remains were found in the Hadar Formation.

While the living takin is endemic to the region of Tibet, the presence of B. churcheri in the African continent confirms that genus was far more widespread in the past.

The species was named in honor of the distinguished Canadian palaeontologist, C.S. "Rufus" Churcher, by Alan Gentry.
