= Winona Historic District =

Historic house in Virginia, United States

- Winona
- U.S. National Register of Historic Places
- U.S. Historic district
- Virginia Landmarks Register
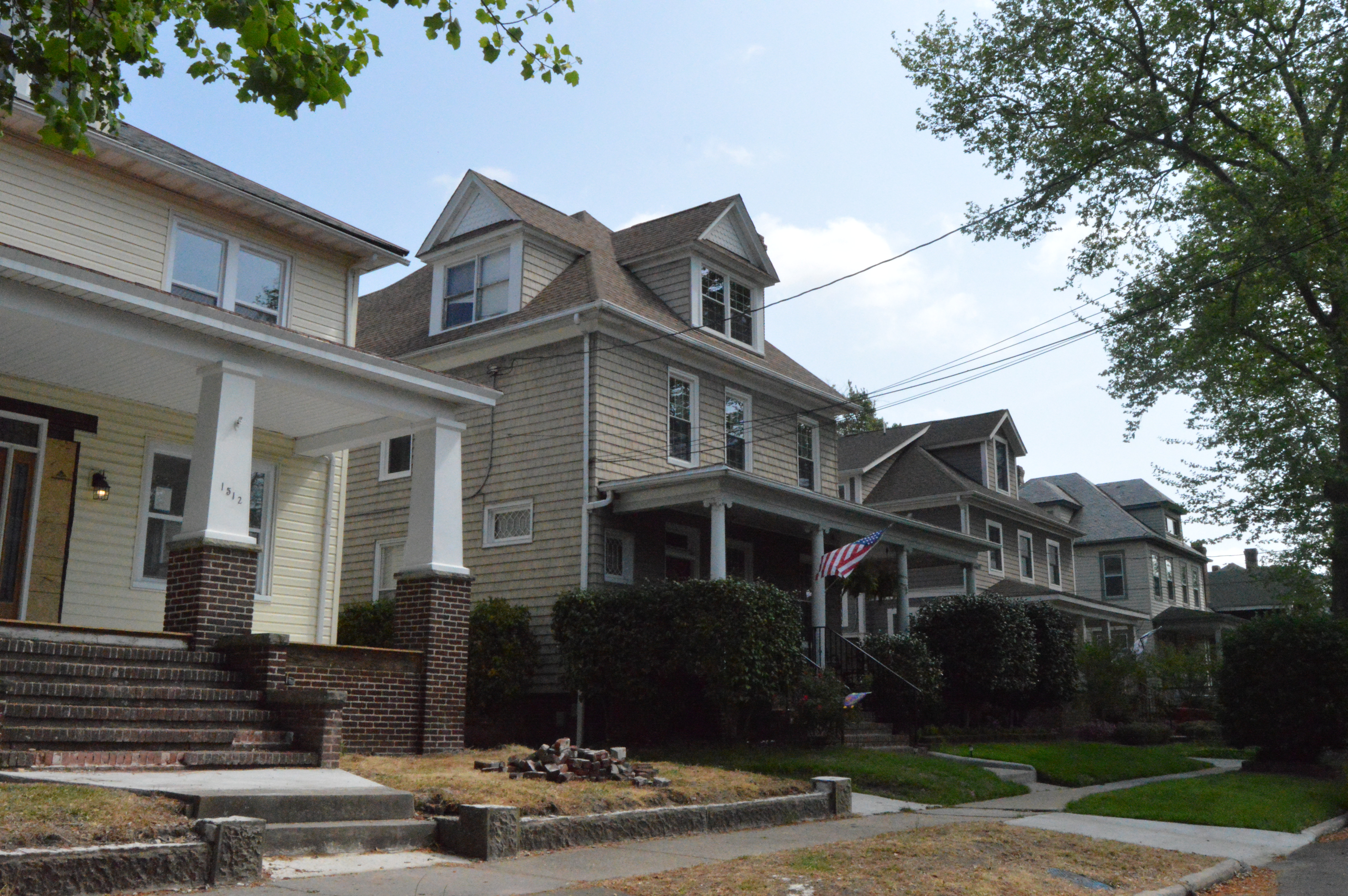
- Holland Avenue

- Location within Virginia Location within the United States
- Location: Roughly bounded by Ashland Circle, Ashland Ave., Elmere Place, Huntington Crescent, Holland Ave., and the Lafayette River in Norfolk, Virginia
- Coordinates: 36°52′51″N 76°16′10″W
- Area: 31 acres (13 ha)
- Built: 1909
- Architect: Jacob Leicht
- Architectural style: Queen Anne, Colonial Revival, et al.
- NRHP reference No.: 01000702
- VLR No.: 122-0828

Significant dates
- Added to NRHP: July 5, 2001
- Designated VLR: March 14, 2001

Winona is a national historic district located at Norfolk, Virginia. It encompasses 203 contributing buildings in a small, cohesive residential neighborhood just north of Lafayette Residence Park in Norfolk. It was platted in 1909, and largely developed between 1916 and 1941. There are notable examples of Queen Anne and Colonial Revival style residential architecture.

It was listed on the National Register of Historic Places in 2001.
