= Potawatomi Zoo =

Zoo in South Bend, Indiana, U.S.

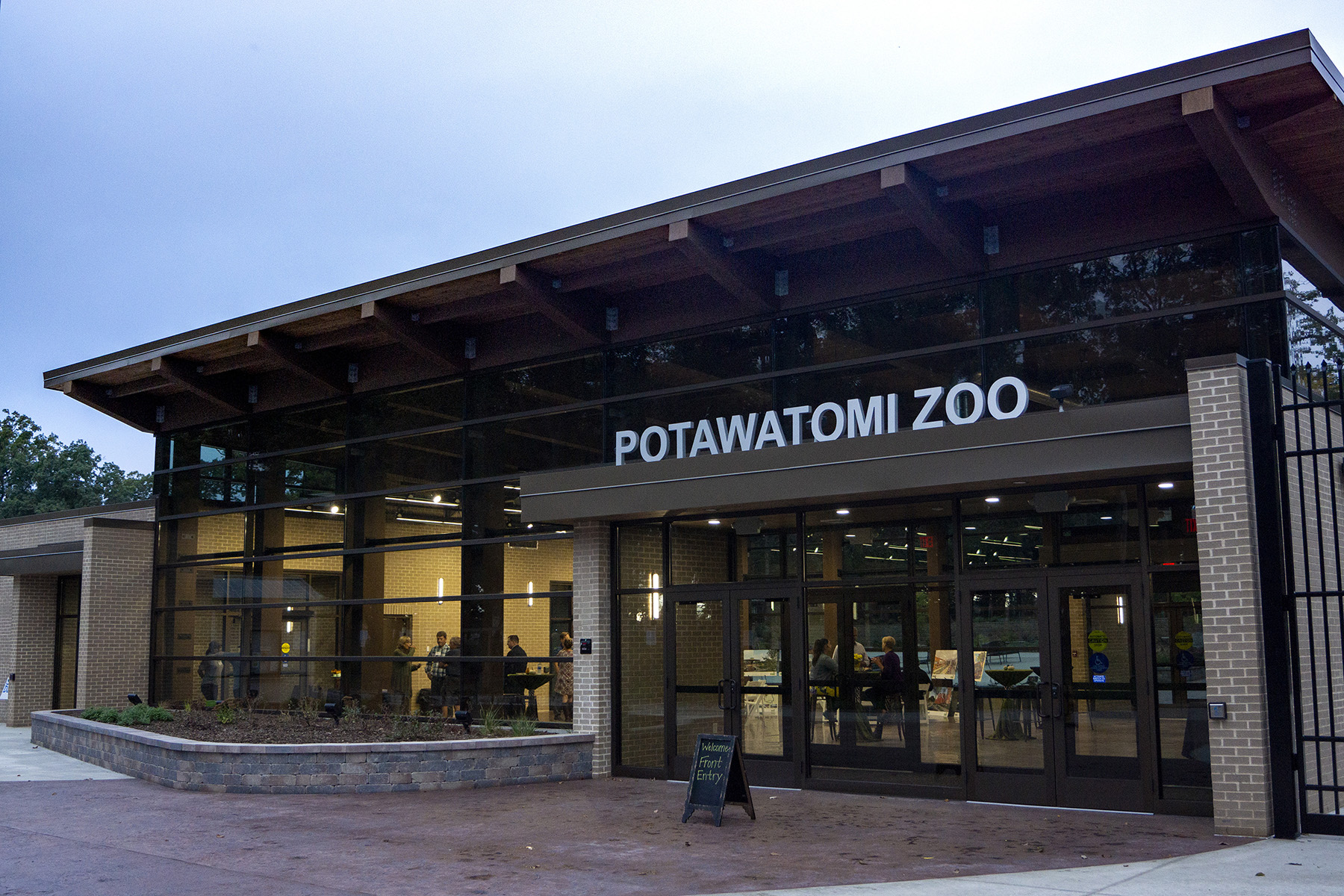
- Entrance
- Interactive map of Potawatomi Zoo
- 41°40′09.59″N 86°13′04.52″W
- Date opened: 1921
- Location: South Bend, Indiana, United States
- Land area: 23 acres (9.3 ha)
- No. of animals: 400
- No. of species: 135
- Memberships: AZA
- Director: Josh Sisk
- Public transit: Transpo
- Website: www.potawatomizoo.org

The Potawatomi Zoo is a 23-acre (9.3 ha) zoological park located in South Bend, Indiana, United States. The zoo is nestled in Potawatomi Park between the St. Joseph River and the Grand Trunk railroad in the east side neighborhood of River Park. Founded in 1921, it is one of Indiana's oldest zoos. It features over 400 animals and is accredited by the Association of Zoos and Aquariums. The zoo has over 300,000 visitors each year.

== History ==
In 1921, the Potawatomi Zoo was established in Potawatomi Park when a single deer was donated to the park board by Albert Russell Erskine, president back then, of the Studebaker Corporation. It is the oldest zoo in Indiana.

At the end of the Great Depression in 1940, the Works Progress Administration constructed the zoo's Cat House, its first permanent structure. The building still stands, serving as home to Amur leopards and snow leopards, and is the oldest zoo building still standing.

The list of species housed at the zoo in 1947 included a polar bear, African lions, dwarf zebu, rhesus monkeys, peacocks and the less exotic raccoon.

In 1971, the St. Joseph Zoological Society, now called Potawatomi Zoological Society, was formed, with Craig D. McCowan as its first director. In 1981, the zoo began charging admission, to provide an accurate attendance count as well as revenue.

The zoo was formerly operated and maintained by the South Bend Parks and Recreation Department. Since January 1, 2014, it has been operated and maintained by the Potawatomi Zoological Society, while still remaining city owned. The zoo installed a new front entrance in 2020.

== Exhibits ==
The Potawatomi Zoo is home to over 400 animals and the zoo participates in over 56 Species Survival Plans.

=== Africa ===
The Africa section spans much of the eastern third of the zoo. The Africa section begins with the Old World Monkeys exhibit which is home to black-and-white colobus monkeys and fennec fox (seasonal). This section also contains other African fauna such as southern ground hornbills, lions, plains zebra, Diana monkeys, African wild dogs, Red river hogs, greater kudu, and ostrich. In 2017, Potawatomi Zoo became the first accredited zoo in the state of Indiana to exhibit okapi, an endangered forest-dwelling relative of the giraffe. The zoo is home to two male okapis, which are viewable in an outdoor exhibit as well as in their Okapi Conservation Center indoor habitat. In 2019, the zoo announced the arrival of a male southern white rhinoceros, Masamba, now permanently on exhibit next to the okapi. A new lion exhibit will begin construction in 2021–2022, in the area where chimpanzees were formerly exhibited; the zoo's remaining two chimps moved to Rolling Hills Zoo to live with a larger troop. Four male Masai giraffes were added to the zoo's collection in 2022. Southern white rhinoceros, Okapi, Black-and-white colobus, Fennec fox, Trumpeter hornbill, Serval, Southern ground hornbill, Diana monkey, Greater kudu, Saddle-billed stork, Grey-crowned crane, American flamingo, African wild dog, African lion, Red river hog, Masai giraffe, Plains zebra, Common ostrich, Marabou stork

=== Asia ===
The Potawatomi Zoo is home to numerous species that are native to parts of Asia but these exhibits are spread throughout the zoo rather than being in one section. Near the front gate on the east side of the zoo is the Amur tiger exhibit and the Sichuan takins. In 2014, a red panda and muntjac exhibit was added near the front gate on the western side. Amur tiger, Sichuan takin, Snow leopard, Amur leopard, Red panda, Reeve's muntjac

=== Australian Outback ===
Until 2020, the zoo had an Australian Outback exhibit in the center of the zoo that allowed zoogoers to walk among emus, red kangaroos, eastern and western grey kangaroos, and Bennett's wallabies. This exhibit also included a yellow-crested cockatoo, a brush-tailed bettong, honeyeaters, laughing kookaburras, and black swans. The Australian Outback was replaced by a giraffe's African savannah exhibit opening in Spring 2022. Kangaroos and emus have relocated to a new exhibit in the southwest corner of the zoo across from the alligator habitat. The laughing kookaburras and blue-faced honeyeaters are housed in nearby aviaries. The lesser sulfur-crested cockatoo is now an ambassador animal. The wallbies and swans moved to other zoos. Red kangaroo, Western grey kangaroo, Emu, Yellow-crested cockatoo

=== Cat House ===
The zoo's Cat House was its first permanent structure built during the Great Depression as part of the Works Progress Administration. The Cat House includes outdoor exhibits for a snow leopard and Amur leopards. The birth of rare Amur leopard cubs in the summer of 2016 was a big Zoo. Nowadays it is also known as the "Leopard House", or the "Leopard Path" Amur leopard, Snow leopard

=== Learning Center ===
The Learning Center is located at the front of the zoo. It is home to many smaller animals and the Zoo's Admissions & Membership Department. Species on exhibit include genet, sand cat, two-toed sloth, golden lion tamarin, cotton-top tamarin, white-faced saki monkey, red-rumped agouti, squirrel monkey, green iguana, banded mongoose, treeshrew, Madagascar hissing cockroach, Texas brown tarantula, Goliath bird eating tarantula, Chilean tarantula, Emperor scorpion, Malaysian scorpion, vinegaroon, as well as various turtles, snakes, geckos, frogs, skinks and other reptiles and amphibians.

=== The Americas ===
The western half of the zoo is home to exhibits representing North and South America. A key feature of the Americas section includes the bison yard which is home to three American bison. In 2011, the zoo added a North American river otter exhibit in the Americas section. The otter exhibit utilizes a green roof, the first of its kind to be used on a municipal building in South Bend. The Americas also includes Chacoan peccaries, bobcats, red fox, Eastern screech owl, red-tailed hawks, prairie dogs, American alligators, capybaras, giant anteaters, crested screamers, blue-and-yellow macaw, and green-winged macaw, and soon will include Spectacled bear.

=== Zoo Farm ===
Pet and feed the animals in the Zoo Farm. Animals at the Zoo Farm include alpacas, goats, sheep, Jersey cow, donkeys, turkeys, chickens, and a pot-bellied pig.

== Conservation ==
The zoo breeds endangered animals and participates in over 56 Species Survival Plan programs. The zoo has had a number of successes including the breeding Chacoan peccaries, Southern three-banded armadillos, and Amur leopards. Since 2007, Pearl (female amur leopard) has had nine cubs with the most recent two being born in 2016. In 2019, the zoo announced the birth of two Sichuan takins, a vulnerable species native to Tibet and parts of China.

== Other Attractions ==
Carousel: The Endangered Species Carousel opened in 2016. The ride features 18 hand-crafted animals, like zebras, lions, and leopards.

Zoo Train: In 2004 the zoo trained opened to the public. Take a ride on a historic 1/3- scale replica CP Huntington Locomotive. The electric train winds around the western half of the zoo for approx. 1/2 miles. The Train has become a major attraction for ZOO BOO as during those nights it turns into a Haunted Train Ride.

== Gallery ==
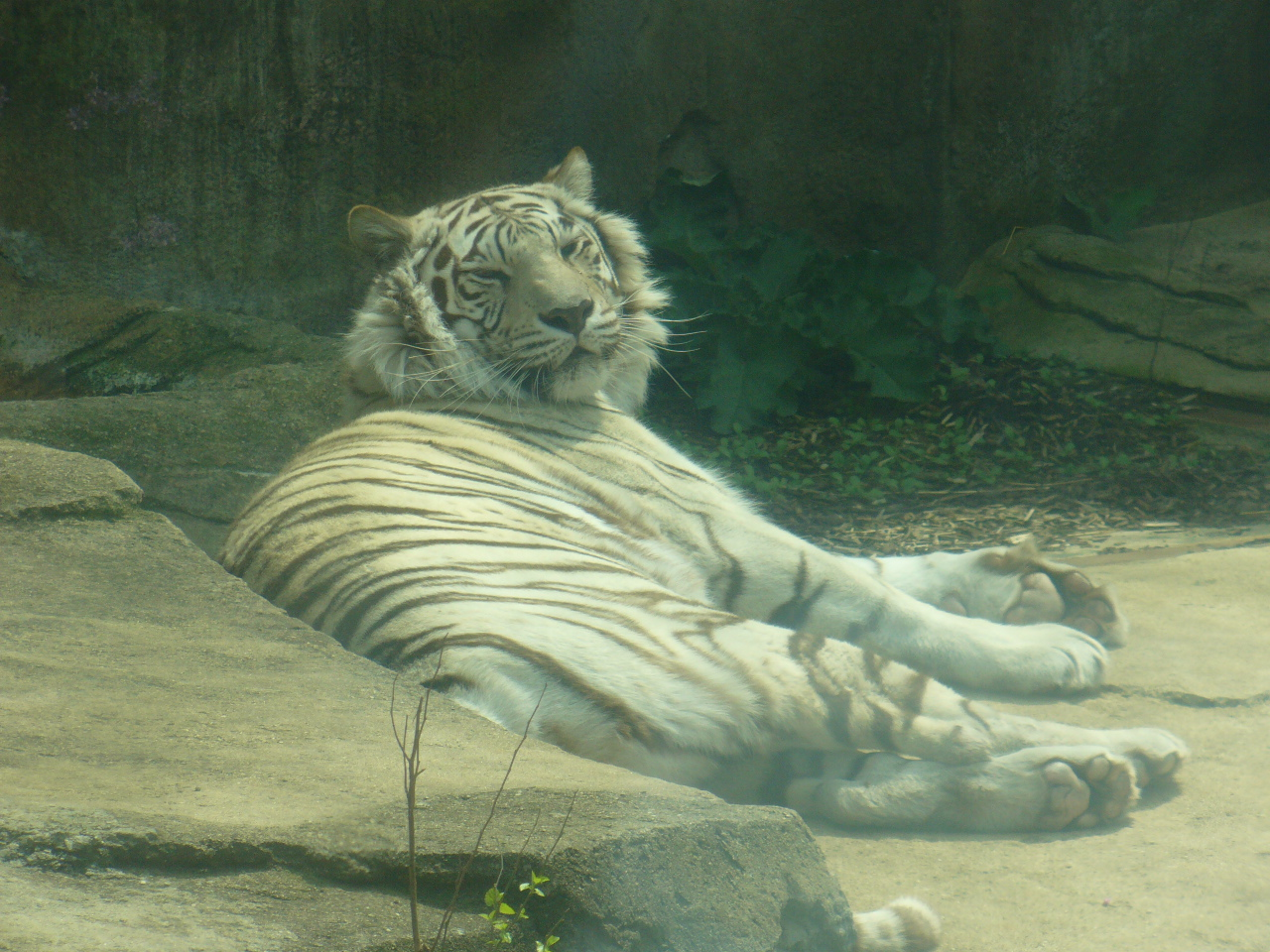
A Bengal tiger (died 2015) at Potawatomi Zoo, May 2007

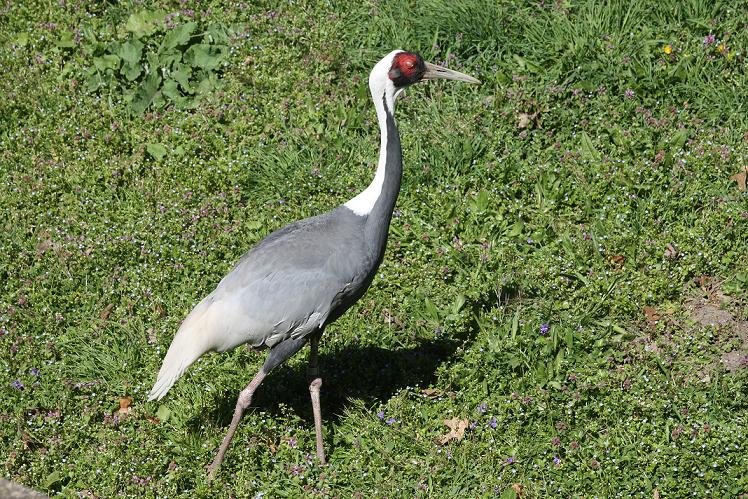
A white-naped crane at Potawatomi Zoo, April 2012

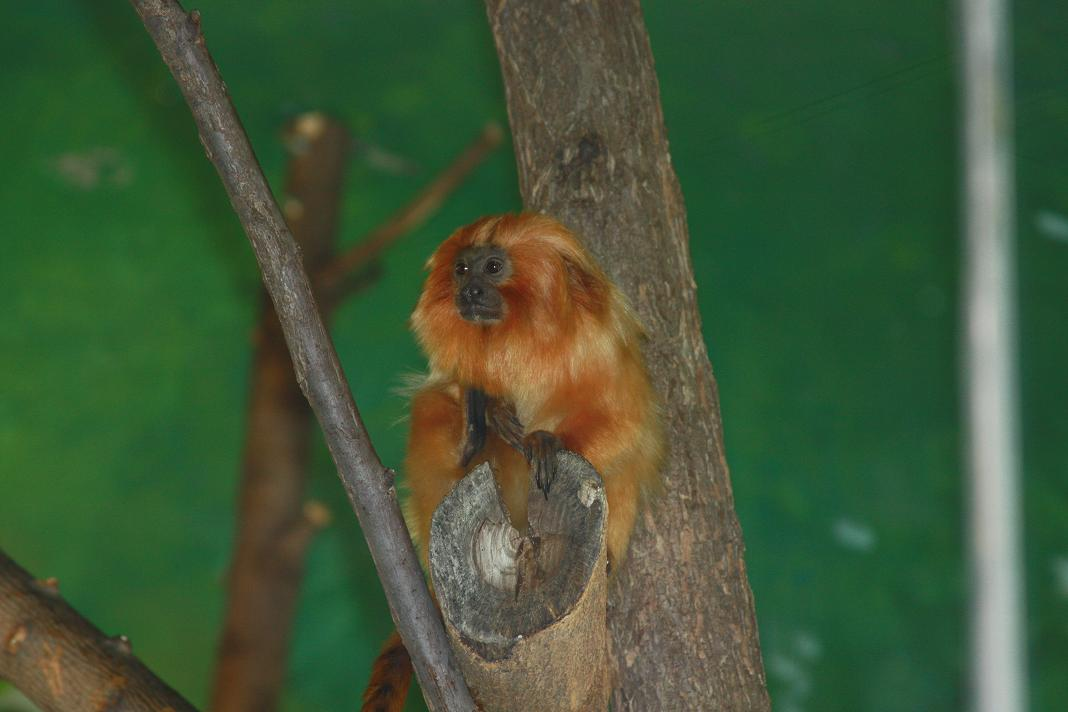
An endangered golden lion tamarin at Potawatomi Zoo, April 2012

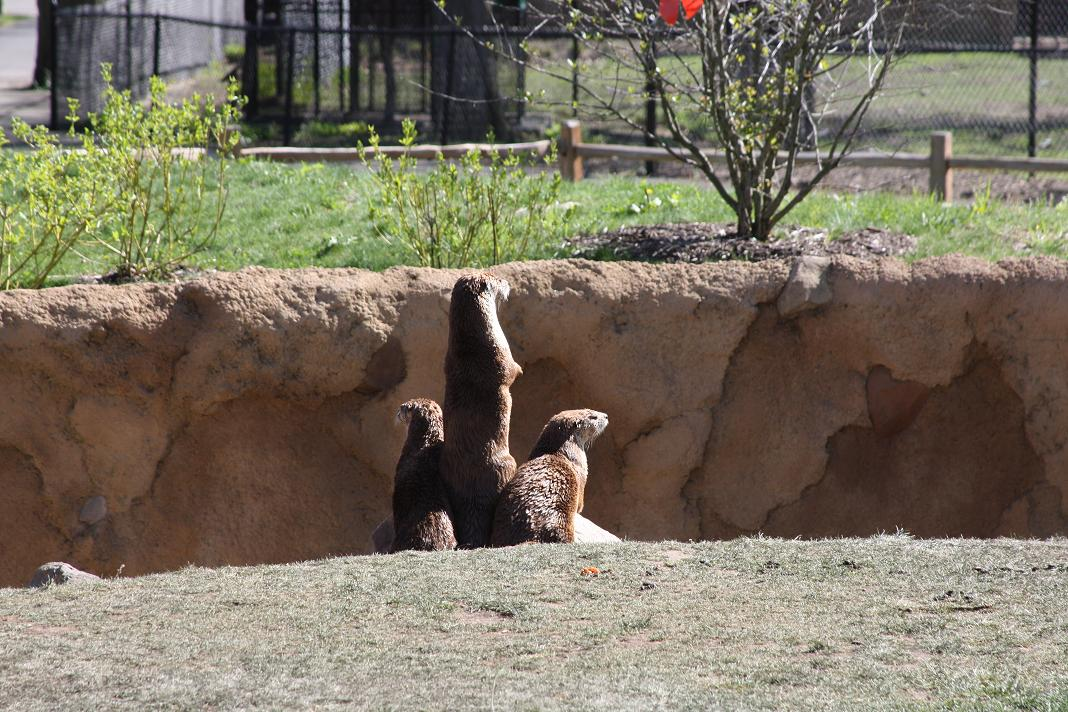
A North American river otter display opened in 2011.

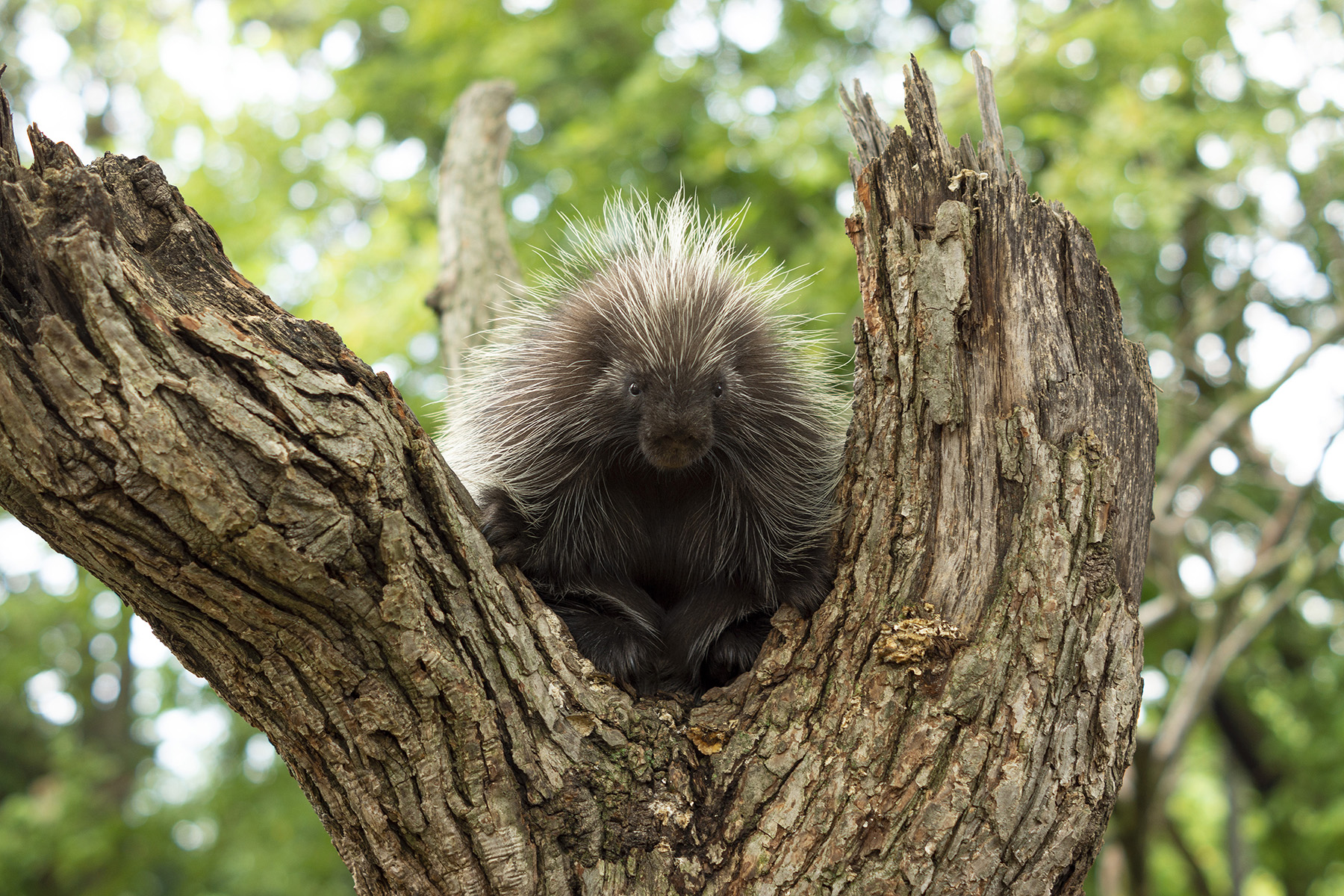
A North American porcupine at Potawatomi Zoo, September 2019
