= Riverview High School =

Riverview High School or River View High School may refer to:

== Canada ==
- Riverview High School (New Brunswick), Riverview, New Brunswick
- Riverview Rural High School, Coxheath, Nova Scotia

== United States ==
- Riverview High School (Arizona), Mesa, Arizona
- Riverview High School (Arkansas), Searcy, Arkansas
- Riverview High School (Riverview, Florida), Riverview, Florida
- Riverview High School (Sarasota, Florida), Sarasota, Florida
- Riverview School, East Sandwich, Massachusetts
- Riverview Community High School, Riverview, Michigan
- River View High School (Ohio), Warsaw, Ohio
- Riverview High School (Pennsylvania), Oakmont, Pennsylvania
- River View High School (Washington), Kennewick, Washington
- River View High School (West Virginia), Bradshaw, West Virginia
