= Riverview, Missouri =

Riverview is the name of three places in the State of Missouri in the United States of America:

- Riverview, Morgan County, Missouri, an unincorporated community
- Riverview, St. Louis County, Missouri, a village
- Riverview, St. Louis, a neighborhood of the City of St. Louis
