= Riverside Park (Pittsville, Wisconsin) =

Park in Wood County, Wisconsin, United States

Coordinates: 44°26′30″N 90°07′59″W

Riverside Park is an urban park located in and administered by the city of Pittsville, Wisconsin. The park was named for its location on the Yellow River.

Amenities include a disc golf course.
