= Riverview Hotel =

Riverview Hotel may refer to:

- Riverview Hotel, Balmain, a hotel in Balmain, New South Wales
- Riverview Hotel, now The Jane in Manhattan, New York
- Riverview Hotel (Irvine, Kentucky)
