= Riverview, Maryland =

Riverview, Maryland may refer to:

- Riverview, Baltimore County, Maryland
- Riverview, Prince George's County, Maryland
- Riverview, Queen Anne's County, Maryland
