= Lafayette Residence Park =

- U.S. National Register of Historic Places
- U.S. Historic district
- Virginia Landmarks Register
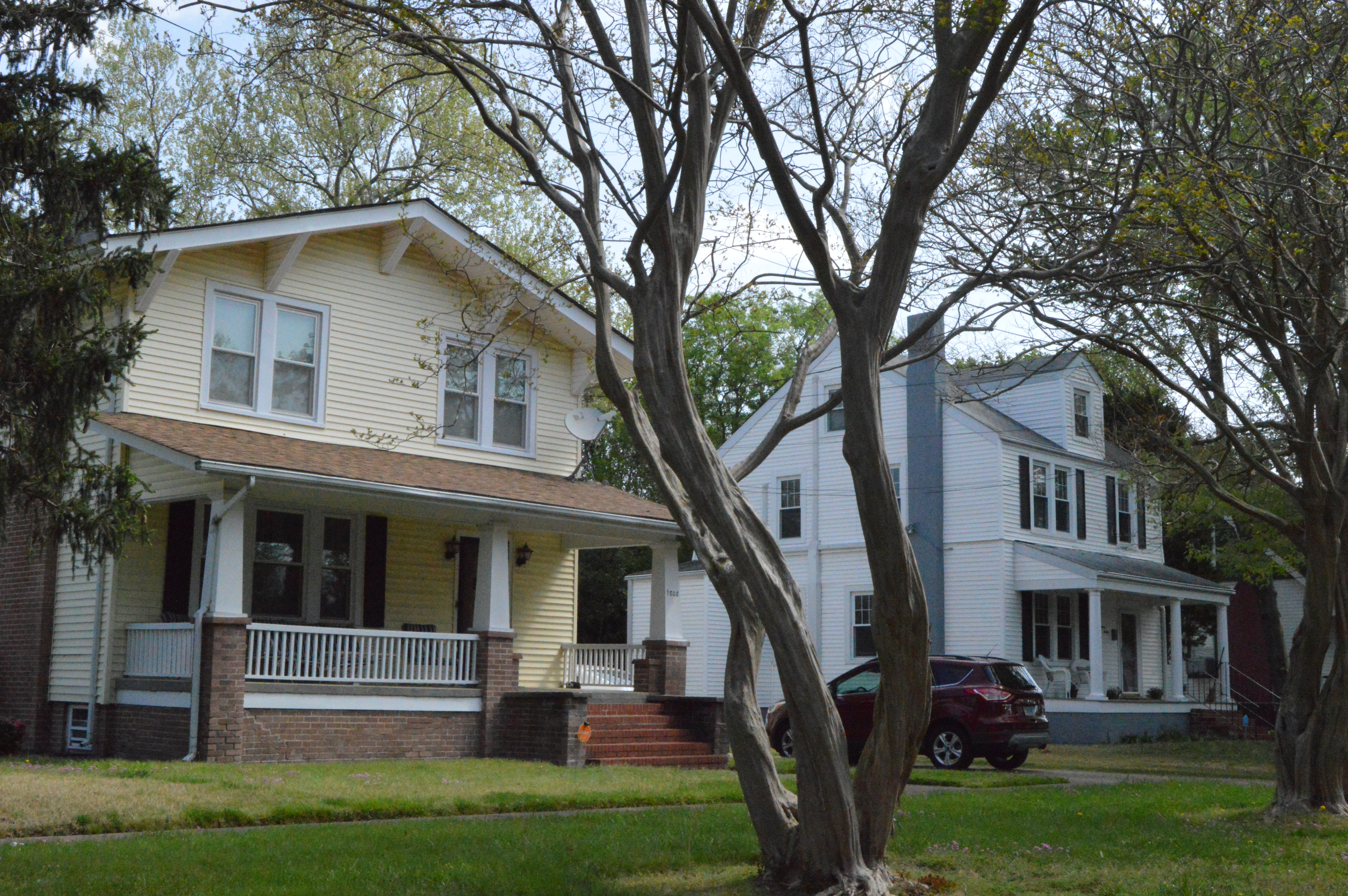
- Houses on Bellevue Avenue

- Location within Virginia Location within the United States
- Location: Roughly bounded by Tidewater Dr., Dupont Creek, Fontainbleau Crescent, La Salle Ave., Orleans C., and the Lafayette River in Norfolk, Virginia
- Coordinates: 36°52′33″N 76°16′10″W
- Area: 112 acres (45 ha)
- Built: 1902
- Architect: Benjamin F. Mitchell, et al.
- Architectural style: Gothic Revival, Queen Anne
- NRHP reference No.: 99000071
- VLR No.: 122-0826

Significant dates
- Added to NRHP: January 27, 1999
- Designated VLR: December 10, 1998

The Lafayette Residence Park is a national historic district located at Norfolk, Virginia. It encompasses 284 contributing buildings in a primarily residential section and suburban community north of the downtown area of Norfolk. It developed during the first quarter of the 20th century and includes notable examples of the Gothic Revival and Queen Anne styles. Notable non-residential buildings include the Lafayette Grammar School (1908-1910), Church of the Epiphany (1920), and the First United Methodist Church (1922).

It was listed on the National Register of Historic Places in 1999.
