= Riverview House, West Ryde =

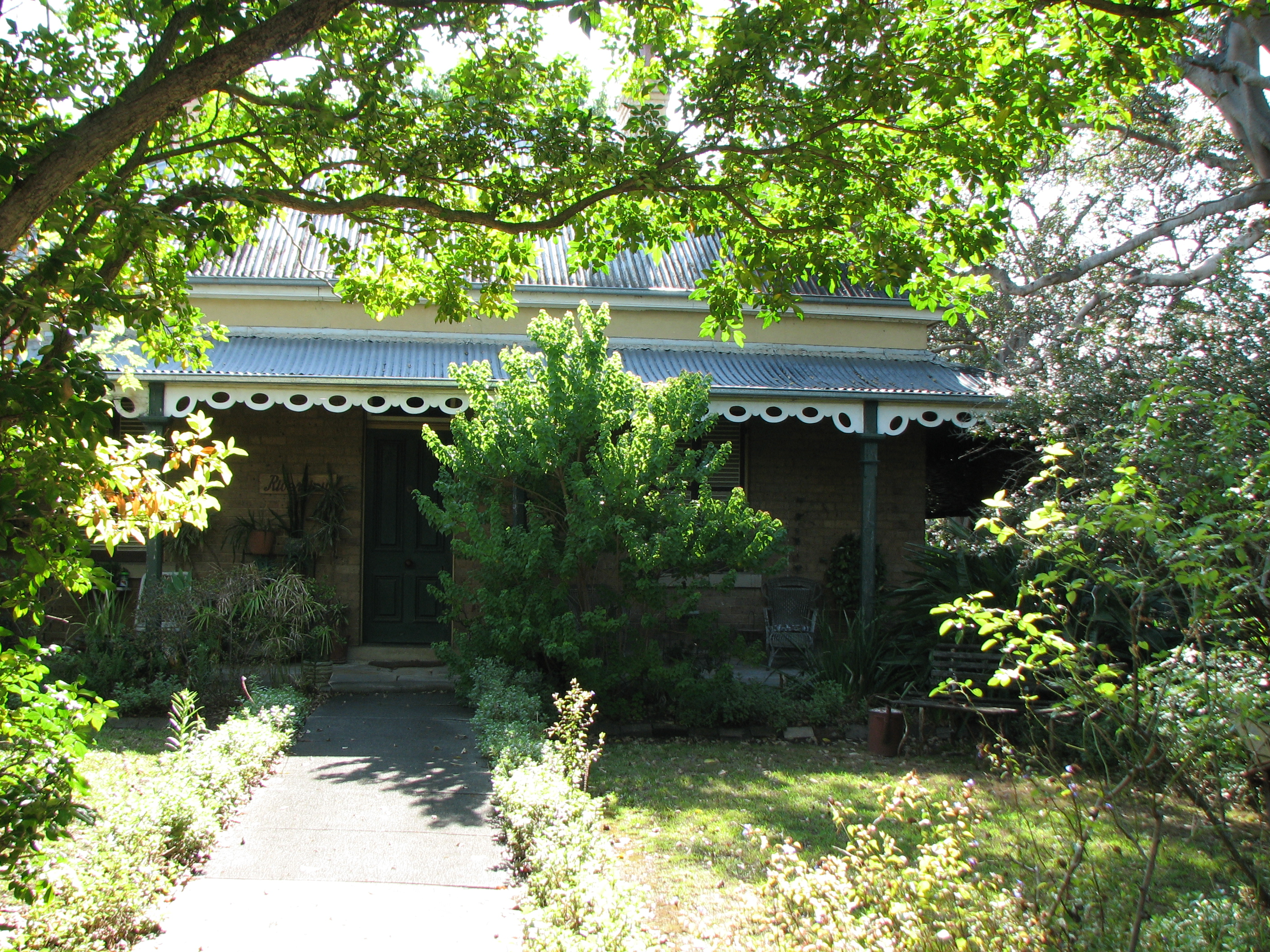
- Riverview House, 135 Marsden Road, West Ryde, New South Wales

- Location within Sydney Location within Australia
- 33°47′48″S 151°03′57″E
- Location: 135 Marsden Road, West Ryde, City of Ryde, New South Wales, Australia

History
- Built: 1860–1878

New South Wales Heritage Register
- Official name: Riverview House, Outbuildings etc.
- Type: State heritage (complex / group)
- Designated: 2 April 1999
- Reference no.: 775
- Type: Homestead Complex
- Category: Farming and Grazing
- Builders: George Spurway

Riverview House is a heritage-listed former orchard and now residence at 135 Marsden Road, West Ryde in the City of Ryde local government area of New South Wales, Australia. It was built from 1860 to 1878 by George Spurway. The property is privately owned. It was added to the New South Wales State Heritage Register on 2 April 1999.

== History ==
The Ryde area was highly suitable for farming and orchards, and early grants to marines were given to encourage agriculture. In 1792 land in the area was granted to eight marines; two of the grants were in the modern area of Ryde. Isaac Archer and John Colethread each received 32 hectares (80 acres) of land on the site of the present Ryde-Parramatta Golf Links, now in West Ryde. Later in 1792, in the Eastern Farms area, twelve grants, most of them about 12 hectares (30 acres), were made to convicts. Much later these farms were bought by John Macarthur, Gregory Blaxland and the Reverend Samuel Marsden. The district remained an important orchard area throughout the 19th century.

=== The Marsden family ===
The land on which Riverview was built is part of Samuel Marsden's 136 hectares (335 acres), in the Parishes of Hunters Hill and Field of Mars, County of Cumberland. Part of this land was 40 hectares (100 acres) which Marsden received as a grant in October 1794. (Present day Marsden Road runs through this grant). To this Marsden added land he had purchased – the grants of marines Cottrell and Tynan, and those of Captain Campbell and George Barrington. These lands were consolidated into one grant of 136 hectares (335 acres), issued in August 1803 and known as Kingston Farm. Winbourne Street marks its eastern boundary.

In his will Marsden left Kingston to his daughter Anne for her life time, thereafter to pass to her daughter Catherine Elizabeth. Marsden died in May 1838. In 1873 Anne Hassall, née Marsden, and her daughter, now Catherine Elizabeth Hope (one of Catherine Elizabeth Hope's descendants was the historian, C. M. H. Clark (H. Hope)), decided to sell the land. It was subdivided into twenty-two lots and offered for sale as the One Tree Hill estate, to be auctioned on 20 June 1873 by J. Y. Mills.

George Spurway of Pennant Hills, farmer, purchased the two north-eastern sections, lots 13 and 14 of three acres, 21 perches, for A£68 17s 9p in November 1873.

Whilst there is evidence that Marsden had farmed his grant in the early years of the colony, there is, at present, no indication of the uses made of this land from c.1810 through to its sale in 1873. It was probably leased for farming. There is a road alignment plan of the area, dated April 1862. It does not show any structures. The subdivision plan does not indicate any structures.

=== The Spurway family ===
George Spurway senior (1806–1885) was a farmer in Devon, England who was transported to New South Wales in 1829 at the age of 22 with a life sentence for house-breaking and stealing from his employer. On arrival in the colony, he was immediately assigned to work at the Brush Farm estate of Gregory Blaxland, probably because of his previous experience in orchard farming in Devonshire. By 1835 Spurway had become overseer of the convicts working on the Brush Farm estate. His masters were Gregory Blaxland and then Blaxland's son-in law, Thomas Foster, who purchased the estate in 1831.

Spurway received his ticket of leave in 1838 and leased a farm from Foster adjoining Brush Farm where he established his own orchard. By 1842 Spurway was winning agricultural prizes for his fruit and whilst still holding a ticket of leave, was appointed to the committee of the Floral and Horticultural Society. He purchased his first land in 1842 on the hillside near Brush Farm. (His home was on the site of Lottie Stewart Hospital). He received a conditional pardon in 1846.

Spurway married an emancipist woman, Frances Johnson née Pratt in 1835 at St Anne's Church, Ryde. They had six children; their youngest, George Spurway, was born at Dundas in 1843.

George Spurway the younger (1843-1913) grew up on the family orchard on the southern side of present-day Stewart Street, Dundas. He married in 1862 and with his wife and children continued to live at Dundas in a house provided by his father in present Spurway Street. About 1869 George the younger moved to Bathurst with his family where he established a fruit shop. He remained in Bathurst until about 1877 but his links with Dundas remained essential for his business interests, as the fruit he sold west of the mountains came from his orchards in Sydney.

While George Spurway the younger was in Bathurst, he purchased three acres of Marsden's Kingston Farm estate in 1873. The land was opposite his family's properties in Stewart Street - and opposite the Brush Farm estate, located near the present intersection of Marsden Road, Stewart Street and Rutledge Street. The transfer indenture is made out to George Spurway of Pennant Hills, rather than of Bathurst, so it is possible that his father George senior attended the auction on the ground and bid for the land for his son. On this land was built Riverview.

By 1877–78 (and certainly by July 1878) George the younger had returned to Dundas. In 1878 George and his brother James received a gift of 22 hectares (55 acres) of orchards on Stewart Street from their father. This gift possibly influenced the timing of George's return from Bathurst to Dundas. James in 1895 transferred his interest in this land to his brother George.

George, wife Ann and their surviving daughters Annie (1864–1936) and Eveline (1869–1945) made their home at Riverview on their return from Bathurst.

==== Construction of Riverview ====
The brick house was built in three sections. The first section was a two-room cottage which faced the river, hence its name, Riverview. It had no windows in the northern side which faces Brush Farm House. This section now forms the rear wing of the house. It is possible that this small cottage was built while George Spurway the younger was still in Bathurst. The second section of the house was a four-room brick cottage to the west of, and adjoining the original two rooms, forming two sides of a courtyard. It seems likely that this larger cottage was built c. 1878–1880 to accommodate the family that moved back to Dundas in 1878. A large rear kitchen, with cellar below, was added to the eastern side of the original two room section. The third and eastern side of the courtyard was completed with a two-storey stable and coach house and a single storey brick dairy.

The outline of the Spurway house, with kitchen wing and coachhouse, is shown most clearly on the subdivision plan for Brush Farm Estate by Gibbs Shallard and Co in 1880. It is also visible, in less detail in the plans for the sale of Dr West's land at Brush Farm in 1886.

The house now faced Marsden Road, had only one window on the northern side which faced Brush Farm, while the southern side of the interior courtyard was open to the garden, the river view, and the prevailing winds. The house remains as configured by c. 1880s with interior fittings from this time such as the fitted sideboard and cupboards in the dining room and a Lassetter's kitchen range.

George prospered as an orchardist, ultimately owning 246 acres by inheritance and purchase in the area of Dundas and Brush Farm. He acquired further land from the Marsden estate, including the adjoining Lot 15, which he purchased from J. F. Ducker in 1896. He was elected as an alderman in the first Dundas Council in 1889 and continued to serve in that capacity for 19 years.

The Spurway family, together with the Mobbs and Midson families among whom various generations had intermarried, was one of the earliest and most successful pioneering orchardists in the Ryde/Parramatta district and was responsible for the development of the major agricultural activity in the region in the nineteenth century.

The family remembered its convict origins. In front of Riverview until the 1890s was a large stone that George Spurway the elder had once lifted to prove his strength to the convicts under his control.

George Spurway the younger died at Riverview in May 1913, survived by his wife Anne and daughters Eveline and Annie and 18 grandchildren. His will divided his extensive properties among his daughters and sons-in-law. Lots 13 and 14 of Marsden's estate, together with Lot 15, and forming an estate of seven acres were left to his wife for her life time and then to his daughter Eveline Cook for her life time, without power of sale, and then to her children as tenants in common.

This will ensured that the house and the surrounding land remained unaltered for two generations.

Ann Spurway died in 1915. Her daughter Eveline Cook died in 1945. Her eight children - Guy Evelyn Dundas Cook of Hunters Hill, company director (b.1891); Albert Clyde Cook of Ourimbah, orchardist (b.1901); Merle Matilda Trist of Villawood (1899); Eileen Ann Lukins of Parramatta North (b.1903); Edna Dorothy Patison of Longueville (b.1895); Margery Victoria Lukins of Strathfield (b.1897); Helen Edith Farley of Killara (b.1905); Una Mary Dundas Henniker of Melbourne (b.1893) – as beneficiaries of the will inherited Riverview and its adjoining two point eight hectares (seven acres) of land. In 1947 the two sons sold their shares to their six sisters for A£287.10s.

One of the daughters, Merle Matilda Trist and her husband moved into Riverview and lived there as weekly tenants. The six sisters were the owners of Riverview when they applied to have it converted to Torrens Title in 1957. While this was being processed, the six sisters took out a mortgage of A£6,000 with Kenneth Charles Beveridge Davies, company director. The conditions noted that the sisters were to expedite the Primary Application, that they were to spend up to A£3,000 on preparation of plans and the construction of a road through the site to enable council approval of a subdivision.

After conversion to Torrens Title, the two point eight hectares (seven acres) was divided into two portions, along a line opposite Emu Street. The northern portion was further subdivided in 1963, creating 14 suburban blocks. An area to the north of the house on the Rutledge Street frontage was resumed for road widening. The lots on Rutledge and Winbourne Streets were purchased in 1963 by A. V. Jennings who built seven houses, the first model exhibition homes in Ryde Municipality. These houses are now recognised on Ryde's local heritage list.

The house Riverview, with its outbuildings was on Lot 1, an area of 1r 2.75p. The portion adjoining it to the south, Lot 14, was 30.35p. Though two legally distinct portions of land from 1963, these two lots remained together in one ownership without a dividing fence for the next thirty years.

Mrs Merle Trist lived in the house with the existing garden forming the adjoining lot. It seems probable that she acquired the house and grounds as her one-sixth division of the property when it was subdivided, but documentary evidence of this has not yet been cited. Mrs Merle Trist lived in the house until c. 1982 when due to ill-health she moved to a nursing home where she died in 1988. She had lived in the house since c. 1948 and her departure after 34 years of occupation, ended almost 110 years of Spurway family association with Riverview and its grounds.

Riverview was included in an Historic Buildings list for Ryde in 1973. It was listed as a recorded building in the National Trust Register published in 1976. It was more formally recognised as a heritage item by Ryde Council in a schedule attached to its Planning Scheme of 1979. Riverview was classified by the National Trust of Australia in 1981 following a detailed assessment by Clive Lucas who noted the house, its remnant Victorian garden and mature fig trees. Though the address is given as 135 Marsden Road in the listing, the property at this time was 133-135 Marsden Road. Riverview was identified as an item of state significance in the Heritage Study of Ryde Municipality from 1985 to 1988. It was listed as an item of state significance in the Ryde Heritage Conservation Strategy – Heritage Inventory, adopted by Ryde City Council in March 1995. It was listed by the Australian Heritage Commission as an item for the (now defunct) Register of the National Estate (with the suburban address cited as Dundas).

Each of these heritage assessments notes the relationship of the house to its garden curtilage. Two mature Port Jackson fig trees (Ficus rubiginosa) dominate the garden closest to the house. A mature Canary Island date palm tree (Phoenix canariensis) is on the adjacent garden lot where there is evidence of an earlier Victorian cottage garden. There was concern that a recent development proposal on the then vacant garden lot would damage the root systems of the substantial Port Jackson fig trees. This house has since been approved by Ryde City Council and built. A programme of remedial care has ensured the survival of the figs and improvement in their condition, with time.

There are no surviving houses in the district belonging to the other important early orchardist family, the Mobbs family.

Riverview with its adjoining garden was sold in 1982 and the new owners, Mr and Mrs William Taylor, purchased both lots and renovated the house and its garden. To all exterior appearances, the house and its garden remained the same as they had for the past century. In 1995 Mr and Mrs Taylor put the house and garden up for sale. The house lot was purchased by V. Sirivivatnanon and J. Noble. The garden lot remained unsold. No fence was erected and the new owners continued to maintain the garden. In 1997 the garden lot was sold by the Taylors and Ryde Council approved an application to build a two-storey dwelling on the then vacant garden lot.

== Description ==
=== Site ===
The house now faces Marsden Road, having only one window on the northern side which faced Brush Farm, while the southern side of the interior courtyard was open to the garden, the river view and the prevailing winds.

The garden has two notable mature Port Jackson fig trees (Ficus rubiginosa) to its south - these dominate the garden (south of and) closest to the house.

A mature Canary Island date palm tree (Phoenix canariensis) is on the (formerly part of Riverview, now subdivided, 133 Marsden Road) garden lot where there is evidence of an earlier Victorian cottage garden. There is concern that the building development on the vacant garden lot will damage the root systems of the substantial Port Jackson fig trees.

A cocks-comb coral tree (Erythrina crista-galli) is northeast of the house near the entry gate. Mature cypress trees grace the front (south-western) garden.

A Cape honeysuckle/tecoma (Tecomaria capensis) hedge faces Marsden Road. Within this hedge is a single plant of the Osage orange (Maclura pomifera), a spiny, deciduous American hedge plant once popular especially on rural properties, but now rare east of the Great Dividing Range.

Dense plantings of shade loving species are underneath the two large fig trees, while more sun-loving flowers are in the more formal front garden either side of the central path to the front door.

=== House and outbuildings (coach house and dairy) ===
Riverview is a single storey house in the colonial Georgian tradition, two rooms deep and three bays wide. It is built of face brick with stone dressings, corrugated iron roof and a bell cast verandah to three sides with a decorative fretwork valance. There is a long service wing integral with the house and a cellar under the kitchen. At the rear is a detached two storey coach house and dairy. There is an iron palisade front fence on stone base, with elaborate stone gate posts (recently moved and re-erected after road widening).

Riverview is a single storeyed house in the colonial Georgian tradition. It is a double pile house, 3 bays wide with a hipped roof and an encircling verandah.

The brick house was built in three sections. The first section was a two-room cottage which faced the river, hence its name, Riverview. It had no windows in the northern side which faces Brush Farm House. This section now forms the rear wing of the house. It is possible that this small cottage was built while George Spurway the younger was still in Bathurst. The second section of the house was a four-room brick cottage to the west of, and adjoining the original two rooms, forming two sides of a courtyard. It seems likely that this larger cottage was built c. 1878 - 1880 to accommodate the family that moved back to Dundas in 1878. A large rear kitchen, with cellar below, was added to the eastern side of the original two room section. The third and eastern side of the courtyard was completed with a two-storey stable and coach house and a single storey brick dairy.

The house now faces Marsden Road, had only one window on the northern side which faced Brush Farm, while the southern side of the interior courtyard was open to the garden, the river view, and the prevailing winds. The house remains as configured by c. 1880s with interior fittings from this time such as the fitted sideboard and cupboards in the dining room and a Lassetter's kitchen range.

Riverview is a single storey house in the colonial Georgian tradition, two rooms deep and three bays wide. It is built of face brick with stone dressings, corrugated iron roof and a bell cast verandah to three sides with a decorative fretwork valance. There is a long service wing integral with the house and a cellar under the kitchen. At the rear is a detached two storey coach house and dairy, of face brick with stone lintels, gabled roof and decorative timber finials and bargeboards. The rear kitchen has a large original Lasseter's kitchen range. All ceilings were replaced c. 1930 and a bathroom has been enclosed on the rear verandah. The rear verandah was enclosed in 1984. There is an iron palisade front fence on stone base, with elaborate stone gate posts (recently moved and re-erected after road widening). There are notable fig trees. A palm tree and evidence of an earlier Victorian cottage garden are reported to exist on the south side of the property on adjacent land which was once part of Riverview's original allotment.

=== Modifications and dates ===
Subdivision of lot to south and construction of a new house (around the Canary Island palm tree from Riverview's time of occupation).

== Heritage listing ==
Riverview House was listed on the New South Wales State Heritage Register on 2 April 1999 having satisfied the following criteria.

The place is important in demonstrating the course, or pattern, of cultural or natural history in New South Wales.

Riverview has been associated for more than a century with a significant local family, the Spurway family who were one of the early pioneers of orcharding in Sydney's north-western region.

It is the home of the son of a convict and is built within sight of the estate on which both parents served their sentences as convict servants. It is therefore unique in its potential to demonstrate the evolution of Australian identity from penal colony to democracy. Comparative significance – rare.

The place is important in demonstrating aesthetic characteristics and/or a high degree of creative or technical achievement in New South Wales.

Riverview is a mid Victorian farmhouse cottage of modest proportions set in its original landscape with associated outbuildings. The house has retained its curtilage with no visual impediment from 1873 until the present, thus demonstrating the character of the district prior to suburbanisation. The building is rare at the local level, and possibly rare at state level.

The place has a strong or special association with a particular community or cultural group in New South Wales for social, cultural or spiritual reasons.

The historical value of Riverview to its local community was recognised by its early inclusion (c. 1973) on lists of historical buildings for the area. The changes in ownership since 1982 have prompted concern about the fate of the house among local historical groups. Comparative Significance – representative.

The place has potential to yield information that will contribute to an understanding of the cultural or natural history of New South Wales.

Riverview has educational and research potential to contribute to our understanding of Australian cultural history through comparison of the surviving Blaxland family houses (homes of the masters of convict servants) – Brush Farm, Newington, the Hermitage – and the surviving Spurway family houses (homes of the convict servants, emancipist settlers and their families) – Riverview (135 Marsden Rd), the Vinery (69 Marsden Road) and possibly Grandview (300 Marsden Rd, Carlingford). Comparative Significance - rare.

The place possesses uncommon, rare or endangered aspects of the cultural or natural history of New South Wales.

See above.

The place is important in demonstrating the principal characteristics of a class of cultural or natural places/environments in New South Wales.

See above.

== See also ==
- Australian residential architectural styles
