= Riverview Park Plat Historic District =

Historic district in Iowa, US

- U.S. National Register of Historic Places
- U.S. Historic district
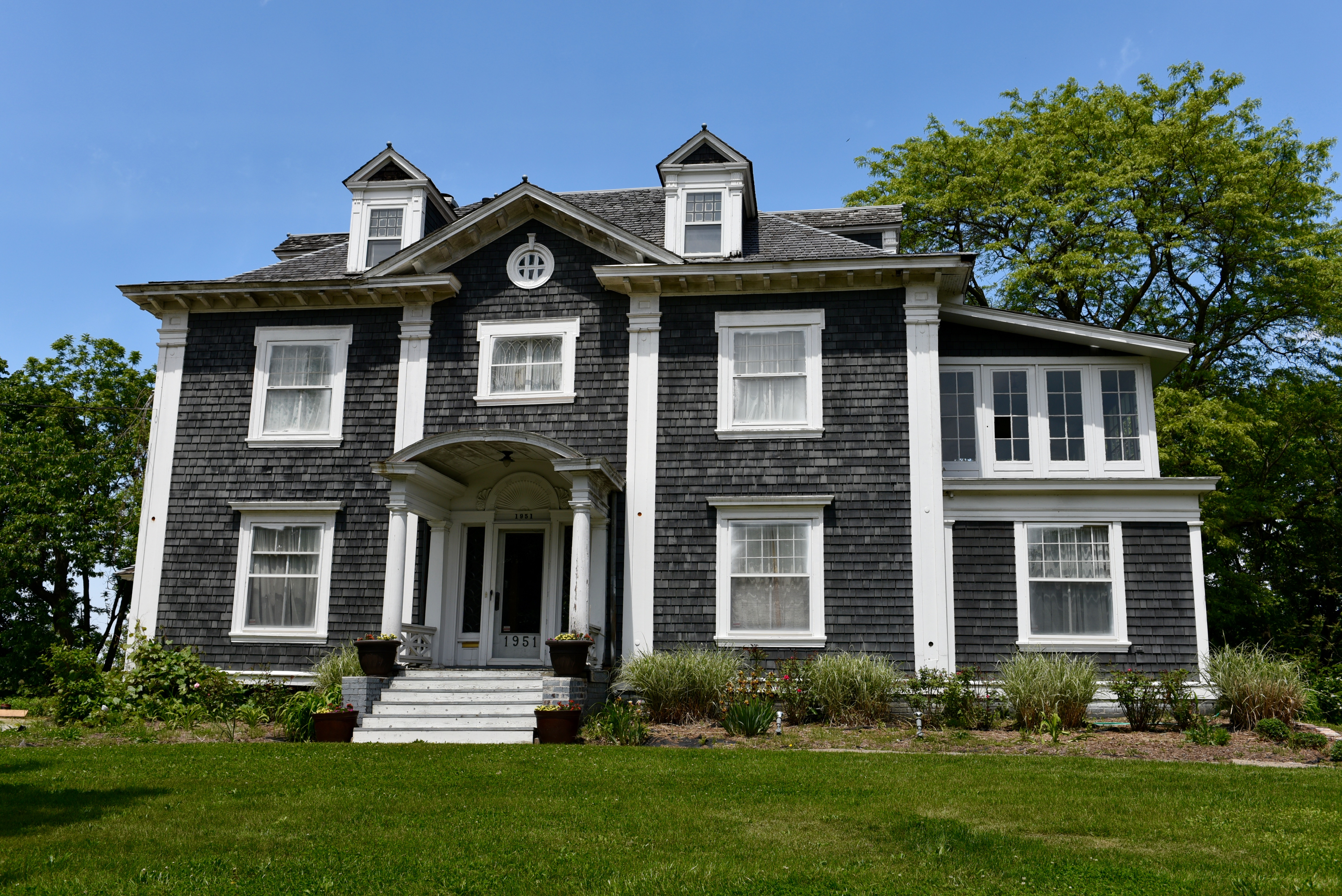
- 1951 Arlington Avenue

- Location within Iowa Location within the United States
- Location: Arlington Ave. between Franklin and 6th Aves. Des Moines, Iowa
- Coordinates: 41°36′43″N 93°37′24″W
- Area: 11 acres (4.5 ha)
- Architectural style: Queen Anne; Tudor Revival; Colonial Revival
- MPS: Towards a Greater Des Moines MPS
- NRHP reference No.: 96001157
- Added to NRHP: October 25, 1996

The Riverview Park Plat Historic District is located in the north-central section of Des Moines, Iowa, United States. It has been listed on the National Register of Historic Places since 1996.

== History ==
In 1886, the Riverview Park Company bought two tracts of land from Wesley and Anne Redhead, who had owned the property for a number of years as an investment. The purchase price was $12,500. There was a great deal of real estate development in Des Moines at this time. However, their expectations were greater than the market. While the lots were expensive, the eight lots on the north side with their panoramic vistas of the Des Moines River sold quickly. The lots south of Arlington Avenue sold more slowly. In 1891, lot 13 was further divided into three lots and was named Jackson's Subdivision. Two years later lots 9 and 10 were subdivided into 13 lots and renamed Arlington Place.

Riverview Park Plat was intended to be an upscale development. Lot owners who wanted to sell their property were required to offer the lots, or their shares of stock in the company, to those who had already invested in the development. If no one made an offer then the lot owner could place the property on the open market. Riverview Park is the earliest known example of a restrictive residential covenant in Des Moines.

Large houses were in fact built in the upper and upper-middle-class neighborhood. Until the 1960s, only a few of the houses had been converted from single family to multi-family dwellings. As the homes continued to age they also deteriorated and more were converted into multi-family housing. In the 1980s, the neighborhood was classified as slum-blight by the United States Department of Housing and Urban Development.

== Architecture ==
The Riverview Park Plat Historic District includes some of the largest architecturally ambitious houses in Des Moines at that time. The Queen Anne and Colonial Revival were the predominant architectural styles employed. There were also examples of eclectic architecture that combined the Colonial Revival, American Four Square, Tudor Revival and American Craftsman styles. Several of Des Moines' architectural firms Liebbe, Nourse & Rasmussen, Wetherell and Gage, C. C. Cross & Company and Hallett and Rawson, had their designs built in Riverview

Riverview Park Plat was one of several naturalistic suburban subdivisions that were developed in Des Moines during the 1880s. Frank Pelton, civil engineer of Des Moines, laid out the plat. Its focus is the curve of the Des Moines River. Arlington Avenue follows a curvilinear course that parallels the river. It also contained an island park, which no longer exists. The street's width also adds to the park-like nature of the area. It is 75 feet (23 m) wide while most of Des Moines' streets at the time were 50 feet (15 m) wide.
