= Riverview House (Vassalboro, Maine) =

Historic house in Maine, United States

- U.S. National Register of Historic Places
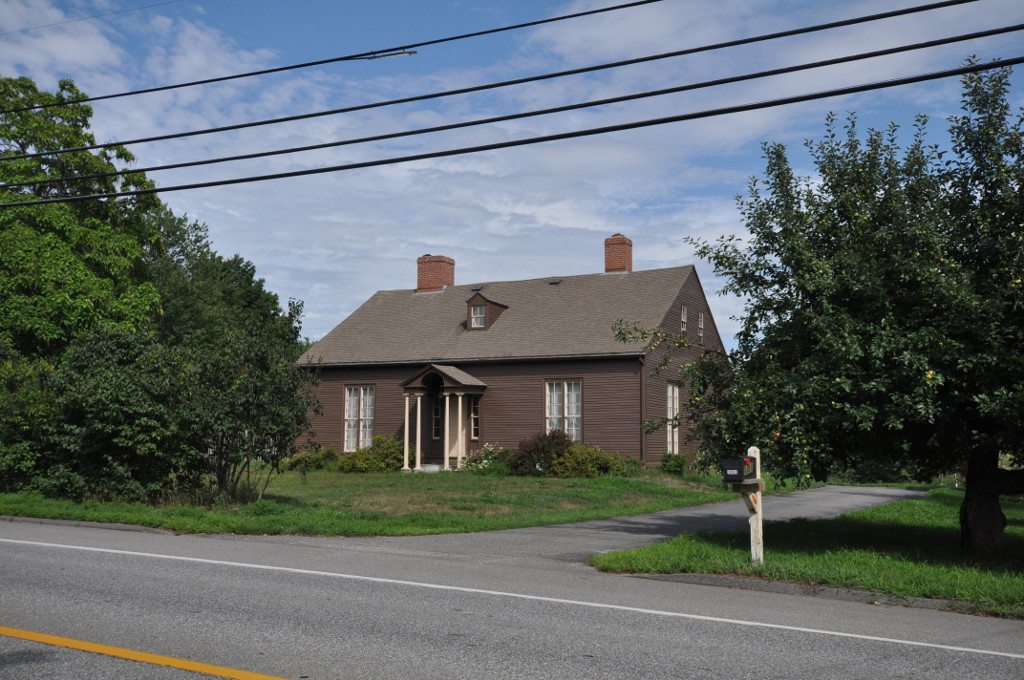

- Location within Maine Location within the United States
- Location: US 201, 0.15 mi S. of Cushnoc St., Vassalboro, Maine
- Coordinates: 44°22′54″N 69°43′7″W
- Area: 9.1 acres (3.7 ha)
- Built: 1796
- Architectural style: Federal, Greek Revival
- NRHP reference No.: 01000369
- Added to NRHP: April 12, 2001

The Riverview House is a historic house on United States Route 201 in southern Vassalboro, Maine. Built in 1796, this modest 1 1/2-story Cape house is believed to be one of the oldest surviving buildings in the town. It has additionally been home to several prominent local politicians. It was listed on the National Register of Historic Places in 2001.

== Description and history ==
The Riverview House stands on the east side of US 201, a short way south of its junction with Cushnoc Street, a former alignment of the main road paralleling the Kennebec River to the north. The house is a single-story wood frame Cape, set on a granite foundation, with a side gable roof and clapboarded exterior. An ell extending to the rear appears to be an original part of the house. The front facade is three bays wide, with windows in the outer bays and the entrance in the center, with flanking sidelight windows and a semi-oval transom window above. The door is sheltered by a Greek Revival porch, which is supported by paired columns and has a cutout gabled pediment that shows the transom window. The interior has evidence of two large chimneys, each with a cooking fireplace.

The house was probably built about 1796, when it is mentioned in town tax records, and was certainly standing by 1821. Its modest features contrast it with a much more elaborate Greek Revival house that stands nearby, but is still possessed of unusually high ceilings and a comparatively elaborate interior, the result of 1830s renovations. The house was owned for many years by the Brown family, which sent three of its members to the state legislature.

== See also ==
- National Register of Historic Places listings in Kennebec County, Maine
