= Riverview (Gatineau) =

Coordinates: 45.4218°N 75.7488°W

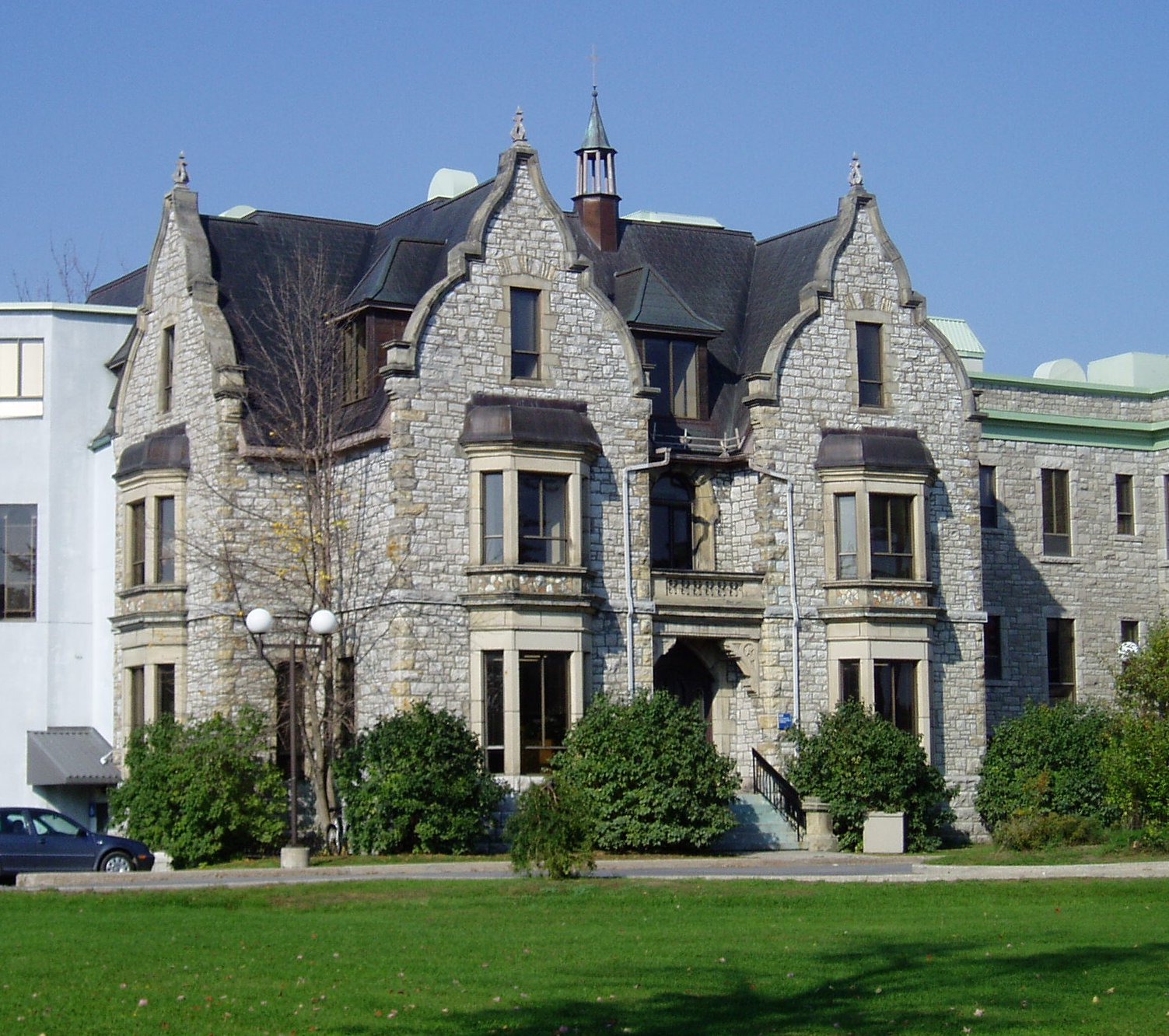
Riverview, Gatineau

Riverview is an historic manor at 432, boulevard Alexandre-Taché in the Hull sector of Gatineau, Quebec, Canada. It was originally built by the lumber baron David Moore in 1865. The sprawling Jacobean structure is a noted landmark. The house later became home to Edward S. Skead and his family, who were also in the lumber business.

The city slowly encroached on the manor and it lost its exclusive status. After the First World War, it was sold and became a popular nightclub known as the Homestead Inn. In 1939, it changed roles again becoming the Ville-Joie-Ste-Thérèse orphanage. As orphanages were phased out in the 1960s, the facility became a nursery, but this closed in 1972. Today the building is the home of the Gatineau campus of the Conservatoire de musique et d'art dramatique du Québec.
