= Riverview Apartments =

Riverview Apartments may refer to:

- Riverview Apartments (Wichita, Kansas), listed on the NRHP in Kansas
- Riverview Apartments (Toledo, Ohio), listed on the NRHP in Ohio
