= Riverview Park & Zoo =

Coordinates: 44°20′34.7″N 78°18′34.3″W

- Interactive map of Riverview Park & Zoo
- Location: 1300 Water Street; Peterborough, Ontario; K9J 7G4
- Land area: 55.5 acres (22.5 ha)
- No. of species: >40
- Memberships: CAZA
- Website: https://www.riverviewparkandzoo.ca/

The Riverview Park & Zoo is a park and zoo located in Peterborough, Ontario, Canada. It was founded in 1933 by Ross Dobbin, general manager of the Peterborough Utilities Commission. In 1968, the commission took over its operations. The zoo was accredited in 1985 and remains the only free admission accredited zoo in Canada. Parking is also free. It is funded through Peterborough Utilities Commission revenue and public donations. In addition to its animal exhibits, the zoo features a miniature train ride, playgrounds, picnic areas, disc golf course, and a CL-13 Sabre Mk V fighter aircraft on display.

== Animals at the zoo ==
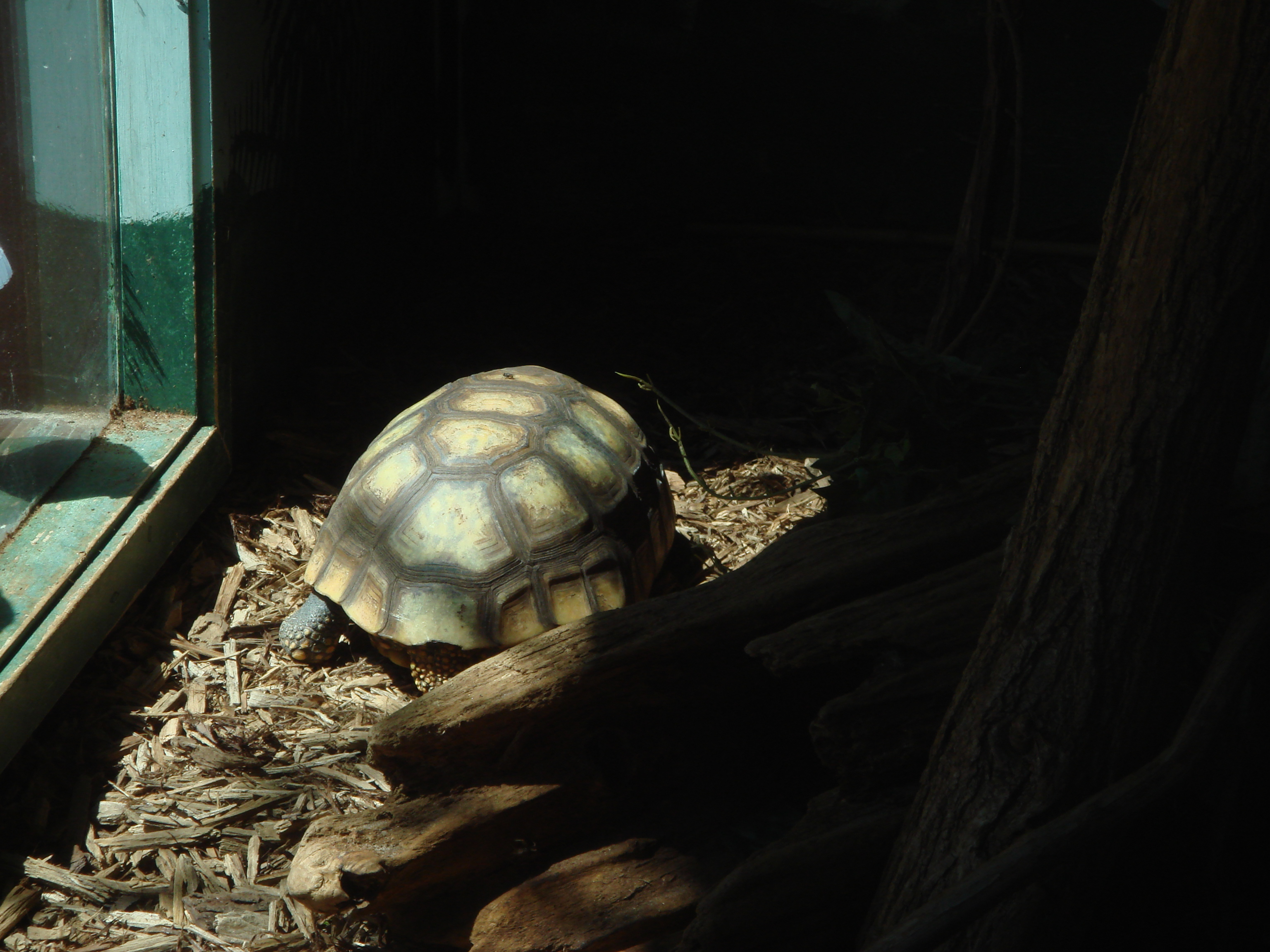
A turtle in its habitat at Riverview Park & Zoo

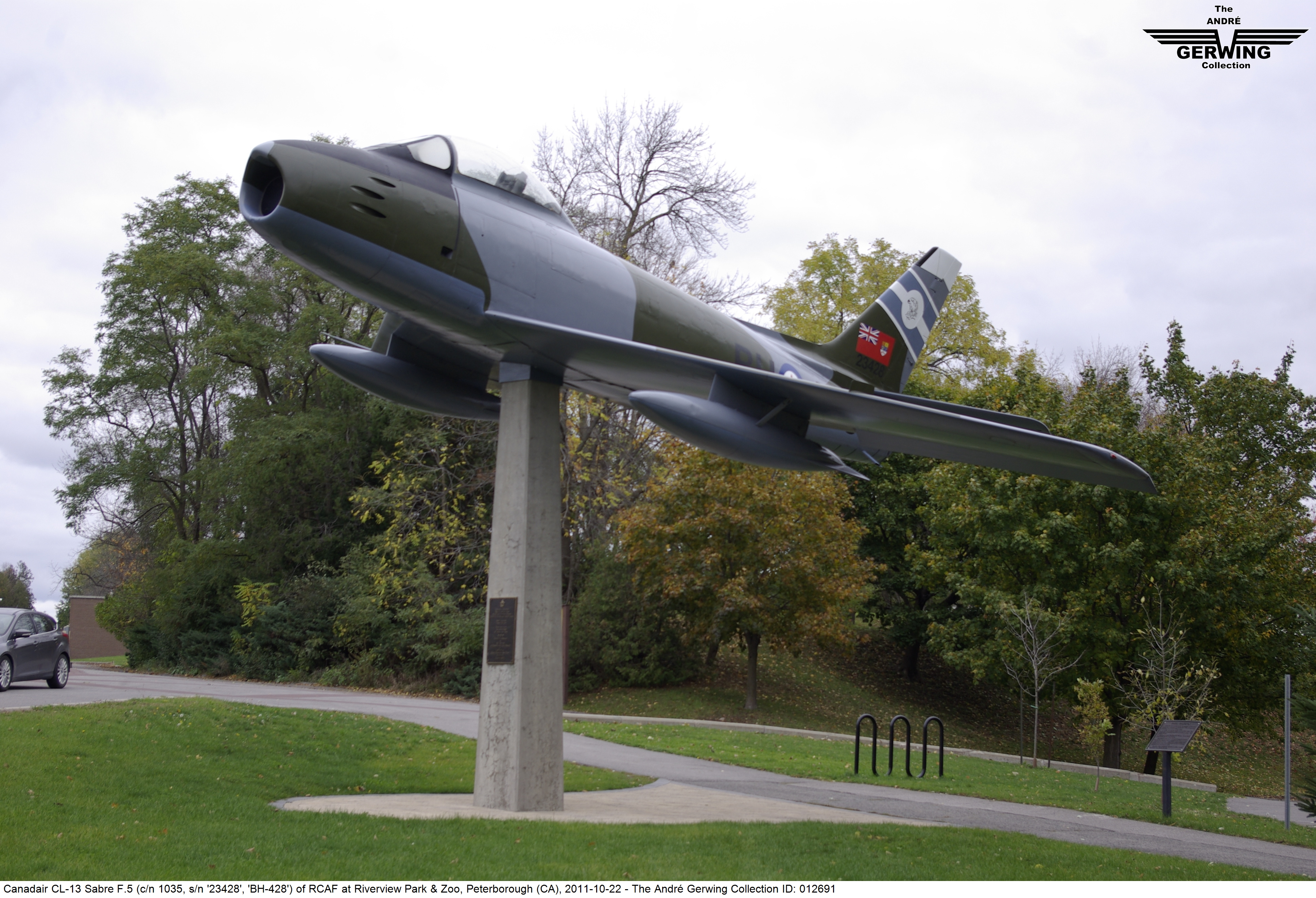
A memorialized Canadair CL-13 Sabre standing on a pedestal at the Riverview Park & Zoo

The first animals to be displayed at the zoo were two alligators, gifted to Ross Dobbin at a conference.

The animals currently housed at the zoo include:

- Reptiles
  - African dwarf crocodile
  - African plated lizard
  - African spurred tortoise
  - Ball python
  - Box turtle
  - Burmese python
  - Boa constrictor
  - Sulawesi forest turtle
  - Yellow-footed tortoise
- Mammals
  - Bactrian camel
  - Barbary sheep
  - Caribou
  - Domestic yak
  - Eurasian lynx
  - Pot-bellied pig
  - Red-necked wallaby
  - Red-rumped agouti
  - River otter
  - Serval
  - Sichuan takin
  - Slender-tailed meerkat
  - Squirrel monkey
- Birds
  - Chestnut-fronted macaw
  - Common peafowl
  - Emu
  - Helmeted guineafowl
  - Wild turkey

== Attractions ==
- Disc golf course
- Picnic areas
- Playground
- Ridable miniature railway
- Splash pad
