= Riverview Historic District (Norfolk, Virginia) =

- Riverview
- U.S. National Register of Historic Places
- U.S. Historic district
- Virginia Landmarks Register
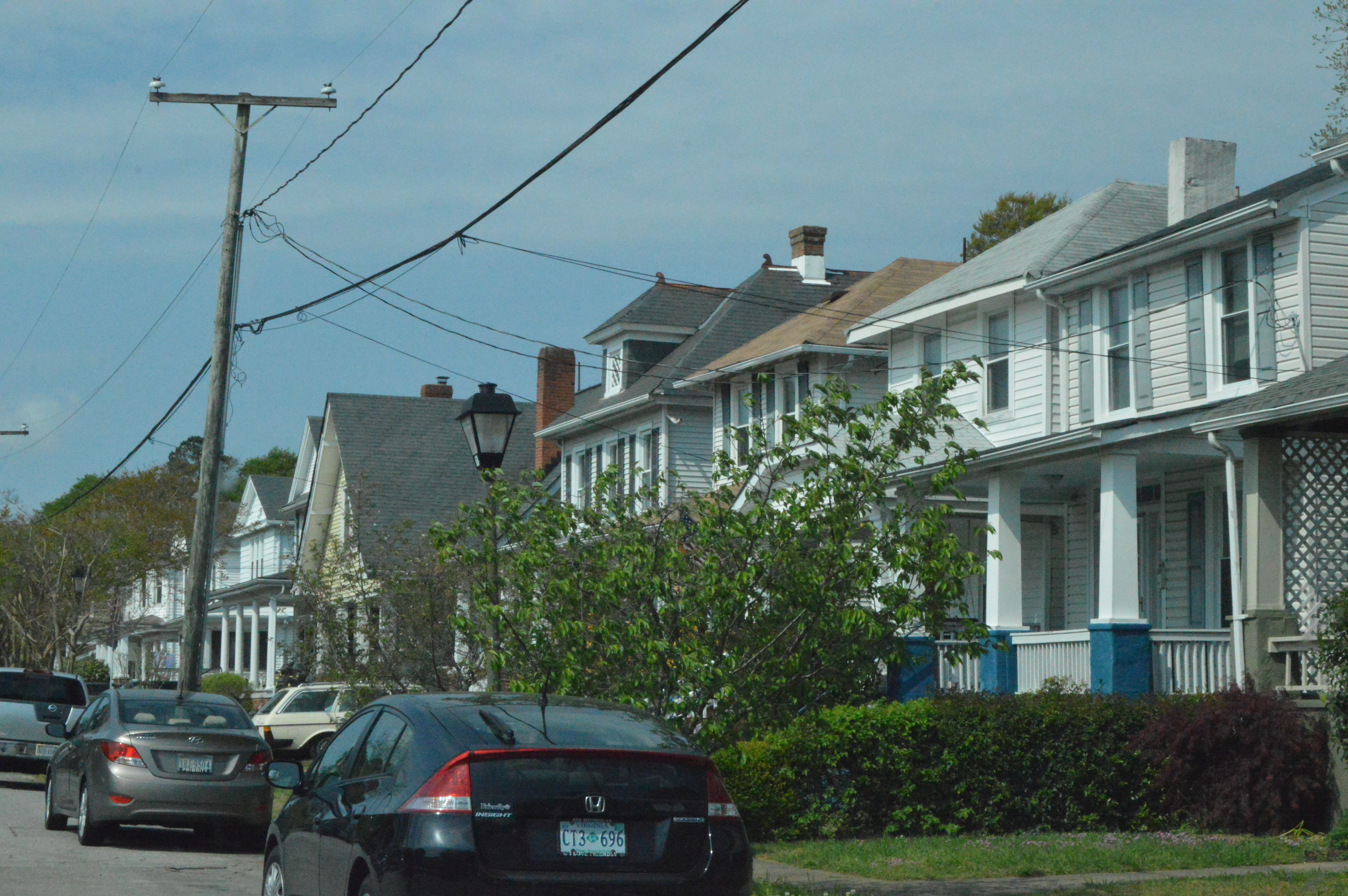
- Houses on Lucile Avenue

- Location within Virginia Location within the United States
- Location: Roughly bounded by LaVallette Ave., Beach Ave. on the Lafayette River, and Columbus Ave., Norfolk, Virginia
- Coordinates: 36°52′58″N 76°16′58″W
- Area: 97 acres (39 ha)
- Built: 1895
- Architect: Charles J. Calrow
- Architectural style: Late Victorian, Late 19th And 20th Century Revivals
- NRHP reference No.: 99001198
- VLR No.: 122-0823

Significant dates
- Added to NRHP: September 24, 1999
- Designated VLR: June 16, 1999

The Riverview Historic District is a national historic district located at Norfolk, Virginia. It encompasses 200 contributing buildings in a primarily residential section of Norfolk. It developed primarily during the first quarter of the 20th century, as a suburban community north of the growing downtown area of Norfolk. The neighborhood includes notable examples of a variety of Late Victorian and Late 19th And 20th Century Revival styles.

Itlisted on the National Register of Historic Places in 1999.
