= Riverview at Hobson Grove =

Historic house in Kentucky, United States

- Riverview
- U.S. National Register of Historic Places
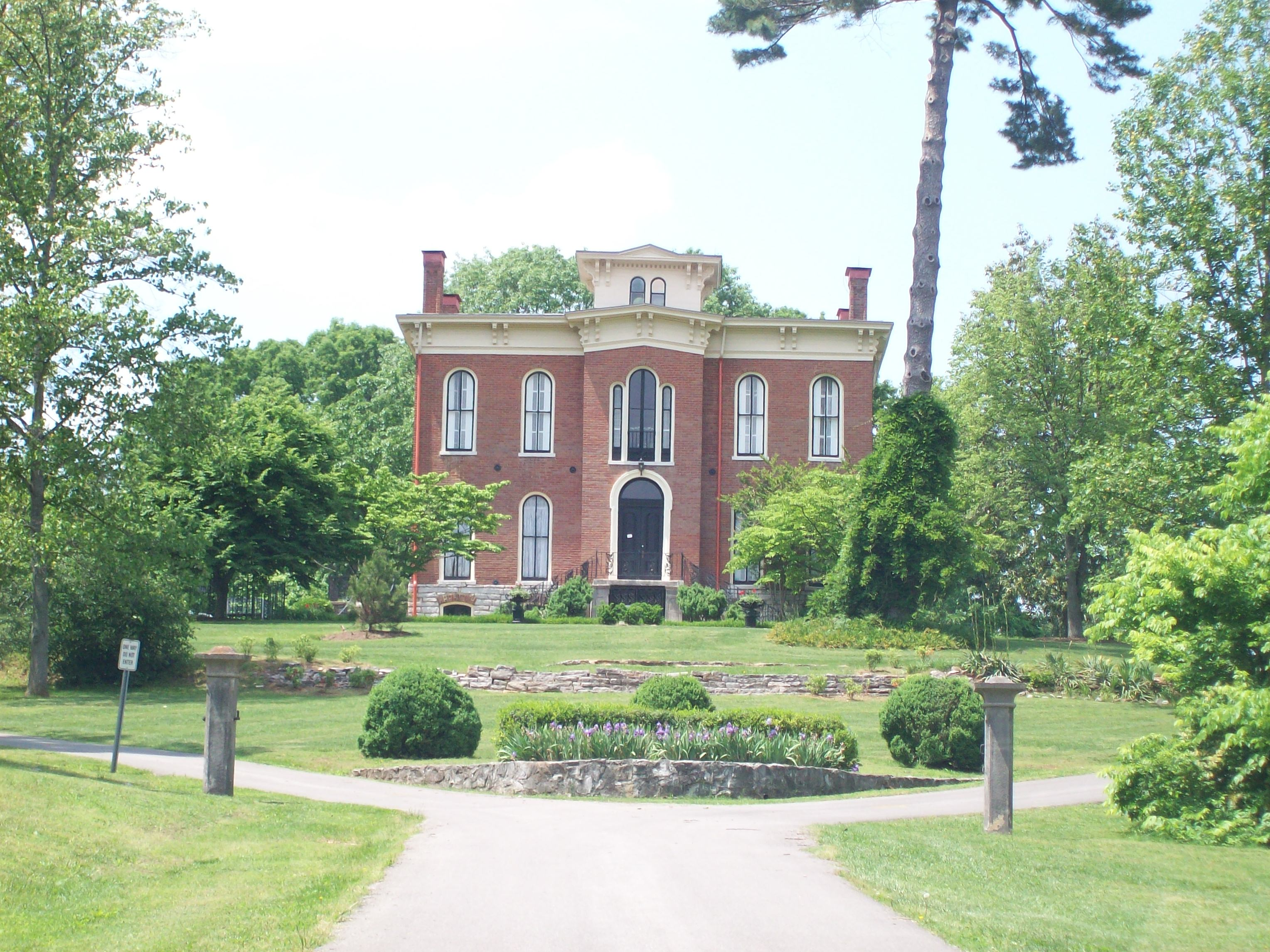

- Location within Kentucky Location within the United States
- Location: Hobson Grove Park at 1100 West Main Avenue, Bowling Green, Kentucky
- Coordinates: 37°0′44″N 86°27′35″W
- Built: Late 1850s–1872
- Architectural style: Italianate
- MPS: Warren County MRA
- NRHP reference No.: 72000546
- Added to NRHP: February 23, 1972

Riverview at Hobson Grove, also known as Riverview or as Hobson House, is an historic home with classic Italianate architecture located in western Bowling Green, Kentucky. Its construction started in the 1850s but was interrupted by the Civil War. The house played a part in Civil War activities in the area. It was completed in 1872. Restored as representative of the Victorian period, it is the centerpiece of Hobson Grove Park in the city. It was listed on the National Register of Historic Places in 1972.

== History ==
Riverview at Hobson Grove was built as the home of Atwood Gaines Hobson and his wife Juliet "Julia" (van Meter) Hobson on a small promontory. It was named because of its proximity to and overview of the Barren River. Construction on the house started in the 1850s, but was halted due to the outbreak of the Civil War.

Because Atwood Hobson was a staunch Union supporter, and his eldest son, William, was commissioned as a colonel in the Union Army, the family was concerned about protecting this property. The commanding officer of the Confederate troops, Simon Bolivar Buckner, who had fought with Atwood's brother, Edward, in the Mexican–American War, agreed to spare the partially built house. His troops built a temporary roof over the basement to use it as a munitions magazine during the winter of 1861–1862, when Bowling Green was the Confederate capital of Kentucky.

Riverview was finally completed in 1872. It is a classic example of Italianate architecture with arched windows, deep eaves with ornamental brackets, and a cupola. The two parlors have painted ceilings. Atwood and Juliet Hobson incorporated some unique ideas for their era into this home. A copper-lined wooden collection tank in the attic, which was connected to the outside guttering, provided running water for the water closet on the second floor. Another innovation beneath the cupola is a hole in the ceiling, sometimes called an oculus, which is part of the ventilation system of the house. When the eight windows in the observatory are open and the windows and doors are open on the floors below, a vacuum is created, pulling the hot air up and out of the house, keeping the air continuously circulating. It works much as an attic fan would work in a home today.

The Hobson family and their descendants lived in the house until 1952. After having a string of various successive tenants and being damaged by fire, the structure was abandoned and condemned in 1965. The city of Bowling Green purchased the property with the intent of demolishing the house and building a golf course. The house was saved when a non-profit organization, the Hobson House Association, was formed the next year. It raised funds to restore the dwelling to its Victorian style and ensure its preservation. The proposed golf course was built nearby and can be viewed from the hill upon which Riverview sits.

== Modern use ==
Riverview, including the house, grounds and a museum, opened to the public for tours in 1972. It is owned and maintained by the City of Bowling Green as part of Hobson Grove Park. The non-profit organization of volunteers, the Friends of Riverview, is dedicated to preserving Riverview's historical and architectural heritage. Riverview hosts various events throughout the year including teas, luncheons, an Easter Egg Hunt, Victorian Garden and Antique Festival, Tea with Mrs. Claus, Candlelight Tours, and other themed presentations and events.

Riverview is listed on numerous Civil War driving tours and Heritage Trails in Kentucky.
