= Riverview (Williamsburg, Virginia) =

Historic house in Virginia, United States

- Riverview Plantation
- U.S. National Register of Historic Places
- Virginia Landmarks Register
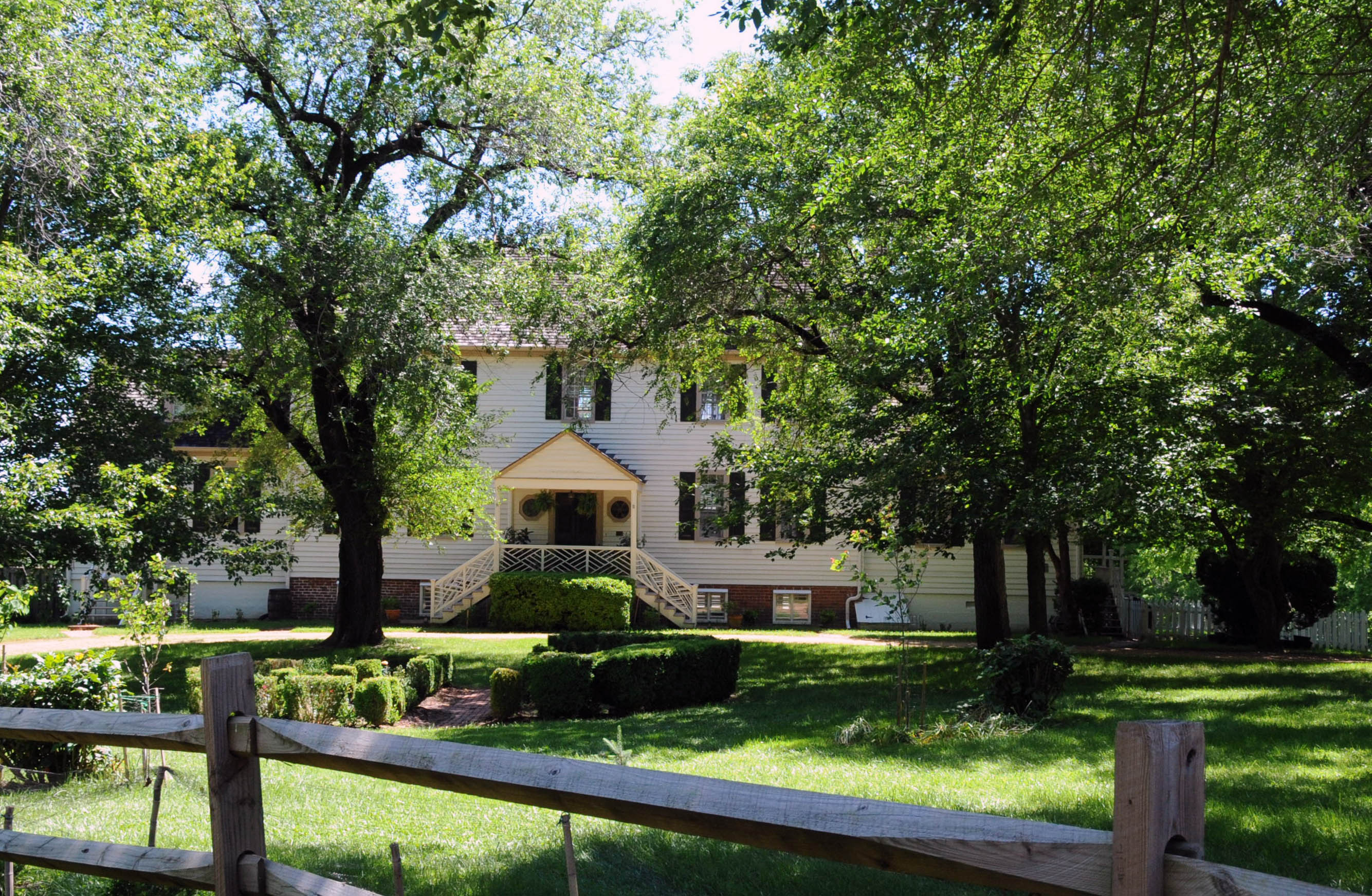
- Location: 124 Riverview Plantation Dr., near Williamsburg, Virginia
- Area: 5 acres (2.0 ha)
- Built: c. 1850, c. 1913-1914
- Architectural style: Federal, Greek Revival
- NRHP reference No.: 96001446
- VLR No.: 047-0025

Significant dates
- Added to NRHP: December 6, 1996
- Designated VLR: June 19, 1996

Riverview Plantation is a historic home located near Williamsburg, James City County, Virginia. The house dates to the 1850s, and consists of a three-story, five-bay, center section flanked by 1 1/2-story end additions of 1913–1914. It has a gable roof with dormers. The interior of the frame dwelling features Federal and Greek Revival design details. Also on the property are a contributing smokehouse (c. 1942), tenant house (c. 1942), and the site of 1850s orchard terraces.

It was listed on the National Register of Historic Places in 1996.

The upper rooms of the home, with their view of the York River, feature drawings on the walls of various sea life, including a whale. Traditionally, after snowfall, the orchard terraces are now utilized as sled runs by neighbors.
