= Chesterfield =

Chesterfield may refer to:

== Places ==
=== Canada ===
- Rural Municipality of Chesterfield No. 261, Saskatchewan
- Chesterfield Inlet, Nunavut

=== United Kingdom ===
- Chesterfield, Derbyshire, a market town in England
  - Chesterfield (UK Parliament constituency)
  - Borough of Chesterfield, a district of Derbyshire formed in 1974
  - Municipal Borough of Chesterfield, a district of Derbyshire until 1974
- Chesterfield, Staffordshire, a hamlet in England
- Chesterfield House, Westminster, London

=== United States ===
- Chesterfield, Connecticut
- Chesterfield, Idaho
  - Chesterfield Historic District listed on the National Register of Historic Places (NRHP)
- Chesterfield, Illinois
- 91st Street/Chesterfield station, a rail station in Chicago, Illinois
- Chesterfield Township, Macoupin County, Illinois
- Chesterfield, Indiana
- Chesterfield, Massachusetts, and two districts listed on the NRHP:
  - Chesterfield Center Historic District
  - West Chesterfield Historic District
- Chesterfield, Michigan
- Chesterfield Township, Michigan
- Chesterfield, Missouri
- Chesterfield, New Hampshire
- Chesterfield Township, New Jersey
  - Chesterfield, New Jersey
- Chesterfield, New York
- Chesterfield Township, Ohio
- Chesterfield County, South Carolina, and its county seat:
  - Chesterfield, South Carolina
- Chesterfield, Tennessee
- Chesterfield (Mascot, Tennessee), listed on the NRHP in Tennessee
- Chesterfield, Utah, a neighborhood in West Valley City
- Chesterfield County, Virginia, and its county seat:
  - Chesterfield Court House, Virginia, a census-designated place
  - Chesterfield State Forest
- Chesterfield Heights Historic District, Norfolk, Virginia, listed on the NRHP

=== Elsewhere ===
- Chesterfield Islands, a French archipelago in South Pacific
- Chesterfield Trough, a trough in the Coral Sea

== People ==
- Chesterfield Smith
- Linda Chesterfield
- Nerissa Chesterfield
- Earl of Chesterfield, head of an aristocratic family from Derbyshire, England

== Other uses ==
- Chesterfield (cigarette), a brand of cigarette
- Chesterfield (typeface)
- Chesterfield coat, a long, tailored overcoat
- Chesterfield College, Chesterfield, England
- Chesterfield F.C., the football team of Chesterfield, Derbyshire, England
- Chesterfield Inn, Myrtle Beach, South Carolina, listed on the NRHP, now demolished
- Chesterfield Pictures, a film company active from 1925 to 1936 until it was merged into Republic Pictures
- Chesterfield sofa, upholstered furniture suitable for seating multiple people
- The Chesterfields, an English indie pop band
- HMS Chesterfield, three ships of the Royal Navy
  - Chesterfield (1791 ship)

== See also ==
- Fort Chesterfield (disambiguation), the name of several places and ships
- The Bing Crosby – Chesterfield Show, a 1949–1952 radio show
