= Chester Field =

Chester Field may refer to:

- Perryville Municipal Airport, formerly Chester Army Airfield, Perryville, Missouri, United States
- Chester Field (Laurel Bay, South Carolina), prehistoric shell ring

== See also ==
- Chesterfield (disambiguation)
