= West Chesterfield =

West Chesterfield could refer to:

- the West Chesterfield Historic District in Chesterfield, Massachusetts
- West Chesterfield, New Hampshire
- a neighborhood in Chatham, Chicago
