= Fort Chesterfield =

Fort Chesterfield is a name given to several establishments or ships. Things named Fort Chesterfield include:

- Fort Chesterfield, a North West Company trading post built in 1791 on the South Saskatchewan River in Saskatchewan, Canada, about twelve miles from the modern village of Empress, Alberta
- Fort Chesterfield, an early 19th-century military fort near the town of Marigot, in the French quarter of Saint Martin
- Fort Chesterfield, a rebel fort on the north bank of the Appomattox River during the American Civil War
- Fort Chesterfield, a British warship built in 1943 (later renamed Hawk, then Cabahawk under owners from Panama and the Bahamas)
- Fort Chesterfield (schooner), a Hudson's Bay Company's motor schooner which served communities along Hudson Bay during the 1920s

== See also ==
- Chesterfield (disambiguation)
