= Chesterfield Heights Historic District =

Historic district in Virginia, United States

- U.S. National Register of Historic Places
- U.S. Historic district
- Virginia Landmarks Register
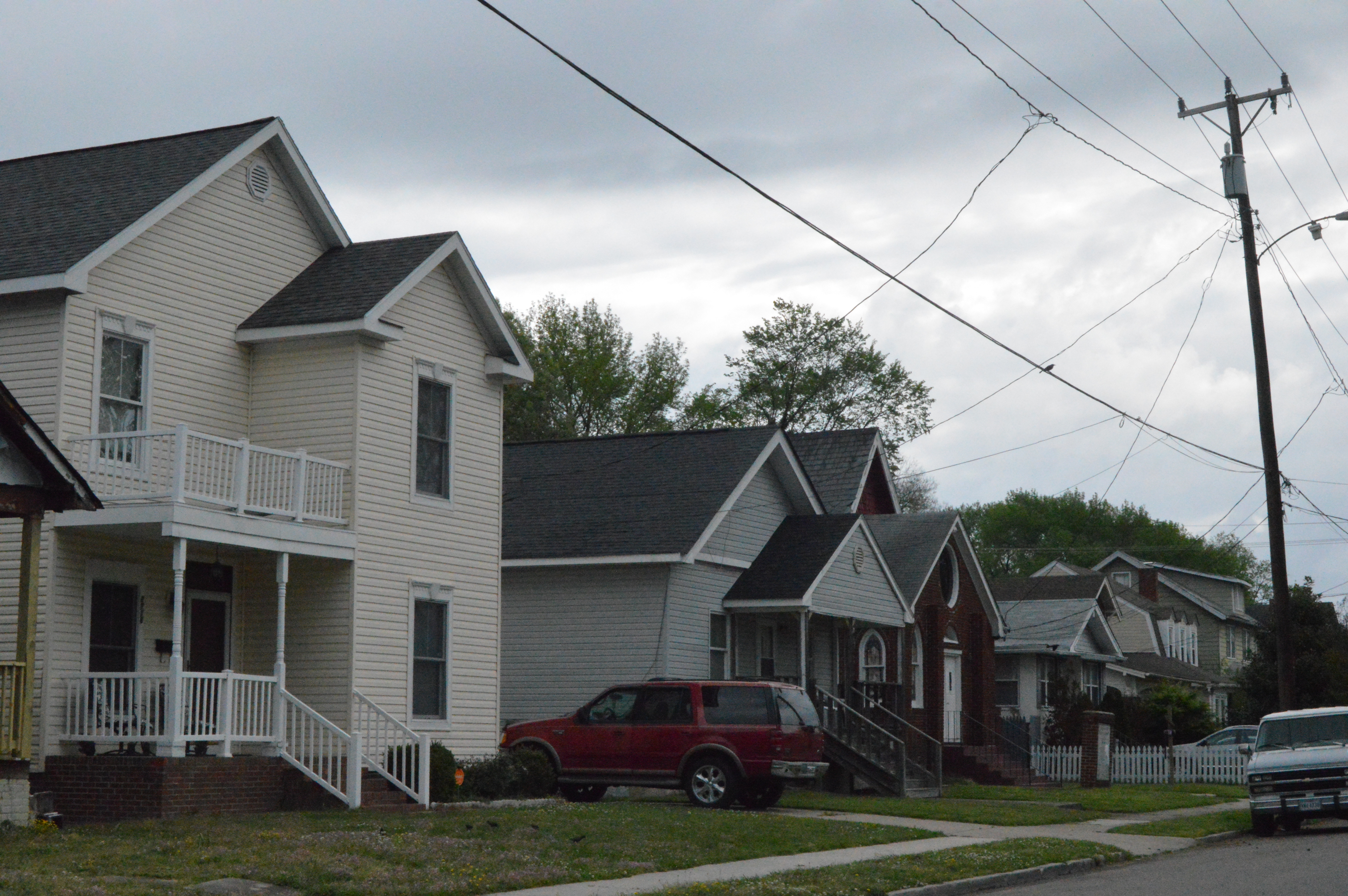
- Houses on Kimball Terrace

- Location within Virginia Location within the United States
- Location: Roughly bounded by the East Branch Elizabeth River, Ballentine Boulevard, Sedgewick Street, and I-264, Norfolk, Virginia
- Coordinates: 36°50′34″N 76°15′28″W
- Area: 85 acres (34 ha)
- Built: 1898
- Architectural style: Queen Anne, Italianate, et al.
- NRHP reference No.: 03000443
- VLR No.: 122-1201

Significant dates
- Added to NRHP: June 10, 2003
- Designated VLR: December 4, 2002

The Chesterfield Heights Historic District is a national historic district located at Norfolk, Virginia. It encompasses 402 contributing buildings, 1 contributing site, and 1 contributing structure in a cohesive residential neighborhood located just to the northeast of downtown Norfolk. It was platted in 1904, and largely developed between 1915 and 1950. There are notable examples of Queen Anne and Italianate style residential architecture. Notable non-residential buildings include the St. Luke's Holiness Church of Christ's Disciples (c. 1950), Monticello Baptist Church (1925), and the Garrett Community Church (1940).

It was listed on the National Register of Historic Places in 2003.
