= Cato Trough =

Oceanic trough in the South Pacific Ocean

Coordinates: 23°10′S 155°0′E

The Cato Trough or Chesterfield Trough is an oceanic trough in the Coral Sea of the South Pacific Ocean. It separates the continental crust of Australia and Zealandia to within 25 km (16 mi) and has a depth of 3,600 m (11,800 ft). The trough is underlain by oceanic crust, having formed as a result of seafloor spreading from about 63 to 50 million years ago.
