= Chesterfield Center Historic District =

Historic district in Massachusetts, United States

- U.S. National Register of Historic Places
- U.S. Historic district
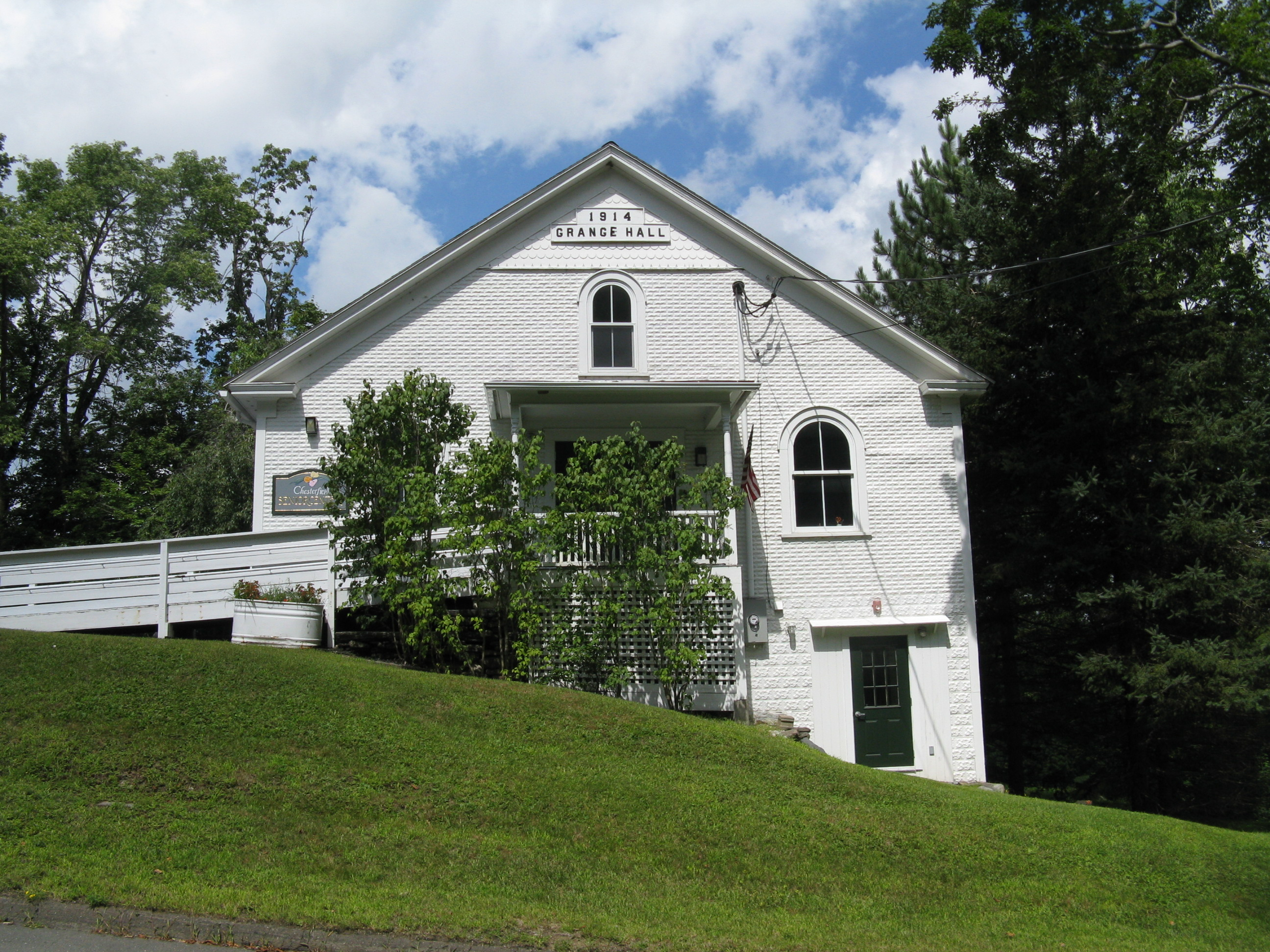
- The former grange hall, now a senior center

- Location within Massachusetts Location within the United States
- Location: Main Rd., South St., North Rd., Bagg Rd., Bryant St., Chesterfield, Massachusetts
- Coordinates: 42°23′30″N 72°50′27″W
- Area: 273.6 acres (110.7 ha)
- NRHP reference No.: 08001177
- Added to NRHP: December 11, 2008

The Chesterfield Center Historic District is a historic district that encompasses the traditional village center of the town of Chesterfield, Massachusetts. The village is reflective of the town's 18th and 19th-century development as an agrarian hill community, with architectural styles before about 1850 predominating. The district was listed on the National Register of Historic Places in 2000.

== Description and history ==
The town of Chesterfield, located in the eastern foothills of The Berkshires, was first permanently settled in 1760, and was incorporated two years later. Its main village was located near its geographic center, and is basically a rural crossroads village, centered on the junction of the east-west Main Road (Massachusetts Route 143) with North Road and South Road, main roads leading to neighboring communities. Its development pattern differed from earlier-settled communities to the east, in that the settlers tended to be dispersed, with their houses on the larger agricultural parcels they owned, instead of being near a village center. The oldest houses of the village date to the 1770s, although one house incorporates in part a structure dating to c. 1768. The village continued to be a center of civic activity through the 19th century, even though economic and industrial activity was focused in other parts of the town, particularly West Chesterfield.

The historic district encompassing the village is very roughly T-shaped, extending mainly along Main Road east and west of the junction, and south along South Road. Also included in the district are properties on Bagg and Bryant Roads, which form a rough square with Main and South Roads southwest of the main junction. The district includes a cluster of civic buildings (town hall, library, grange hall, and Congregational Church), one commercial building (a general store), and a number of houses. These buildings are built in a variety of architectural styles, ranging from traditional Georgian to late Victorian Queen Anne. Most of the houses are vernacular versions of some style, and are 1-1/2 to 2-1/2 stories in height, of wood frame construction.

== See also ==
- National Register of Historic Places listings in Hampshire County, Massachusetts
