= Chesterfield State Forest =

Forest in Chesterfield County, Virginia, U.S.

Coordinates: 37°18′25″N 77°32′27″W

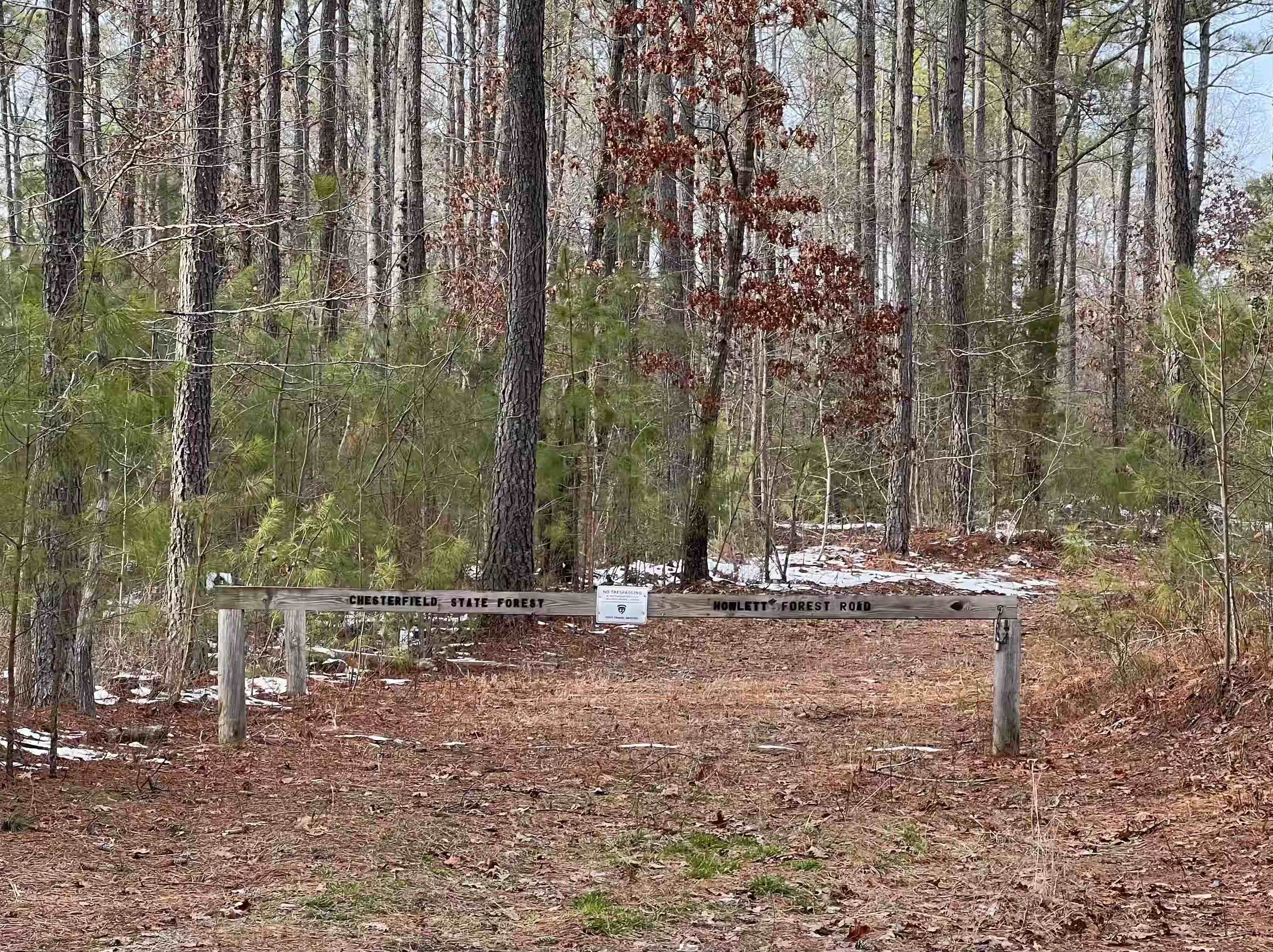
Chesterfield State Forest gate.

The Chesterfield State Forest is a forest located in Chesterfield County in the U.S. state of Virginia. It consists of around 440 acres (0.7 sq mi) of mostly loblolly pine trees.
