= Chesterfield Inn =

- Formerly listed on the U.S. National Register of Historic Places
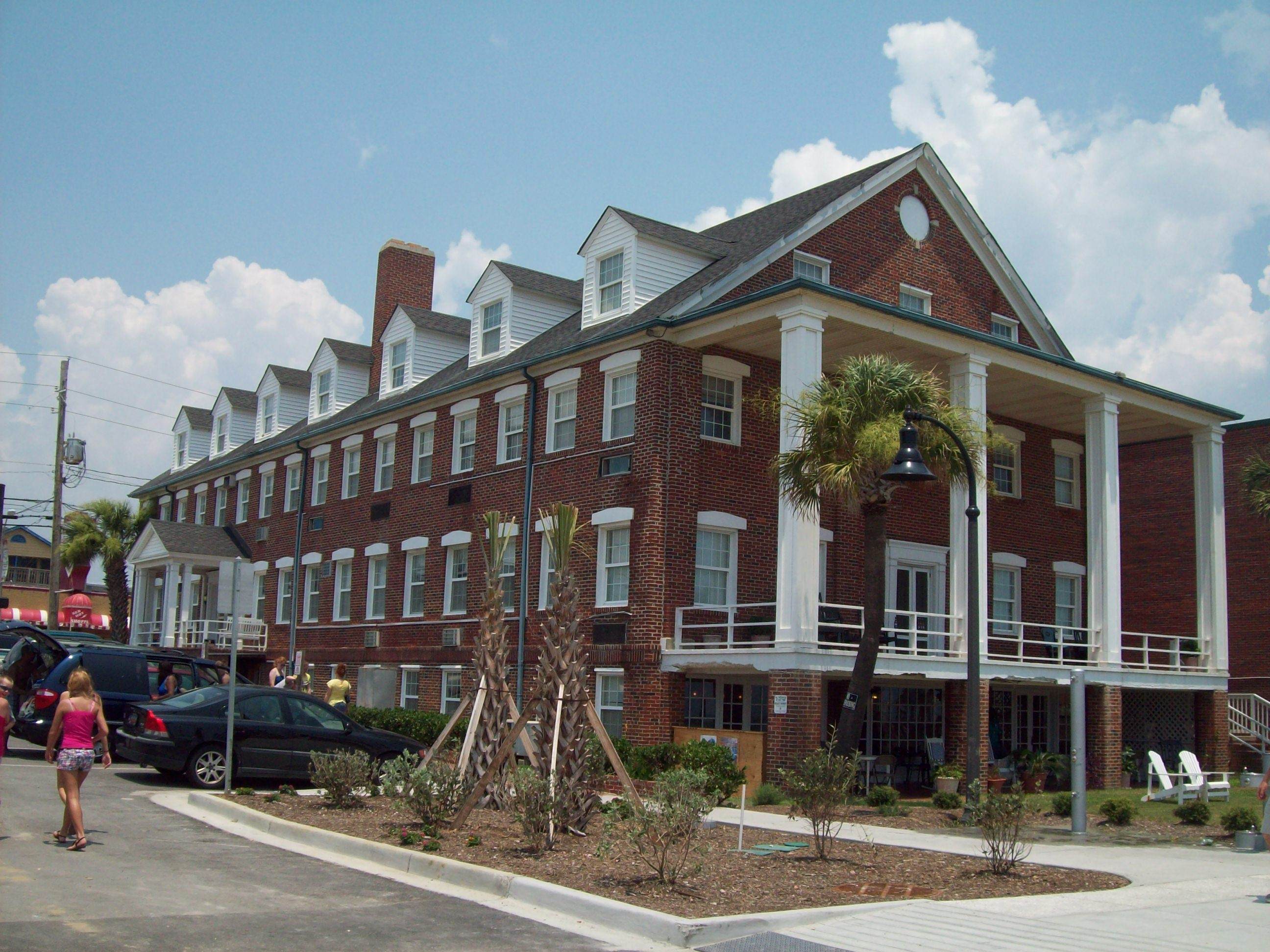
- Chesterfield Inn, Beachside View, June 2010

- Location within South Carolina Location within the United States
- Location: 700 N. Ocean Blvd., Myrtle Beach, South Carolina
- Coordinates: 33°41′23″N 78°52′54″W
- Area: less than one acre
- Built: 1946
- Architectural style: Colonial Revival
- MPS: Myrtle Beach MPS
- NRHP reference No.: 96001218

Significant dates
- Added to NRHP: November 7, 1996
- Removed from NRHP: October 23, 2013

Chesterfield Inn, also known as Chesterfield Inn and Motor Lodge, was a historic hotel located at Myrtle Beach in Horry County, South Carolina. The Chesterfield Inn consisted of two three-story, rectangular buildings constructed in 1946 and 1965. The 1946 building was of frame construction with a brick veneer exterior, with an end to front gable roof, and a raised basement foundation. It was an unusual example of Colonial Revival style architecture in the Myrtle Beach area.

It was listed on the National Register of Historic Places in 1996. It was removed from the list on October 23, 2013 after being demolished to make way for a miniature golf course in 2012.

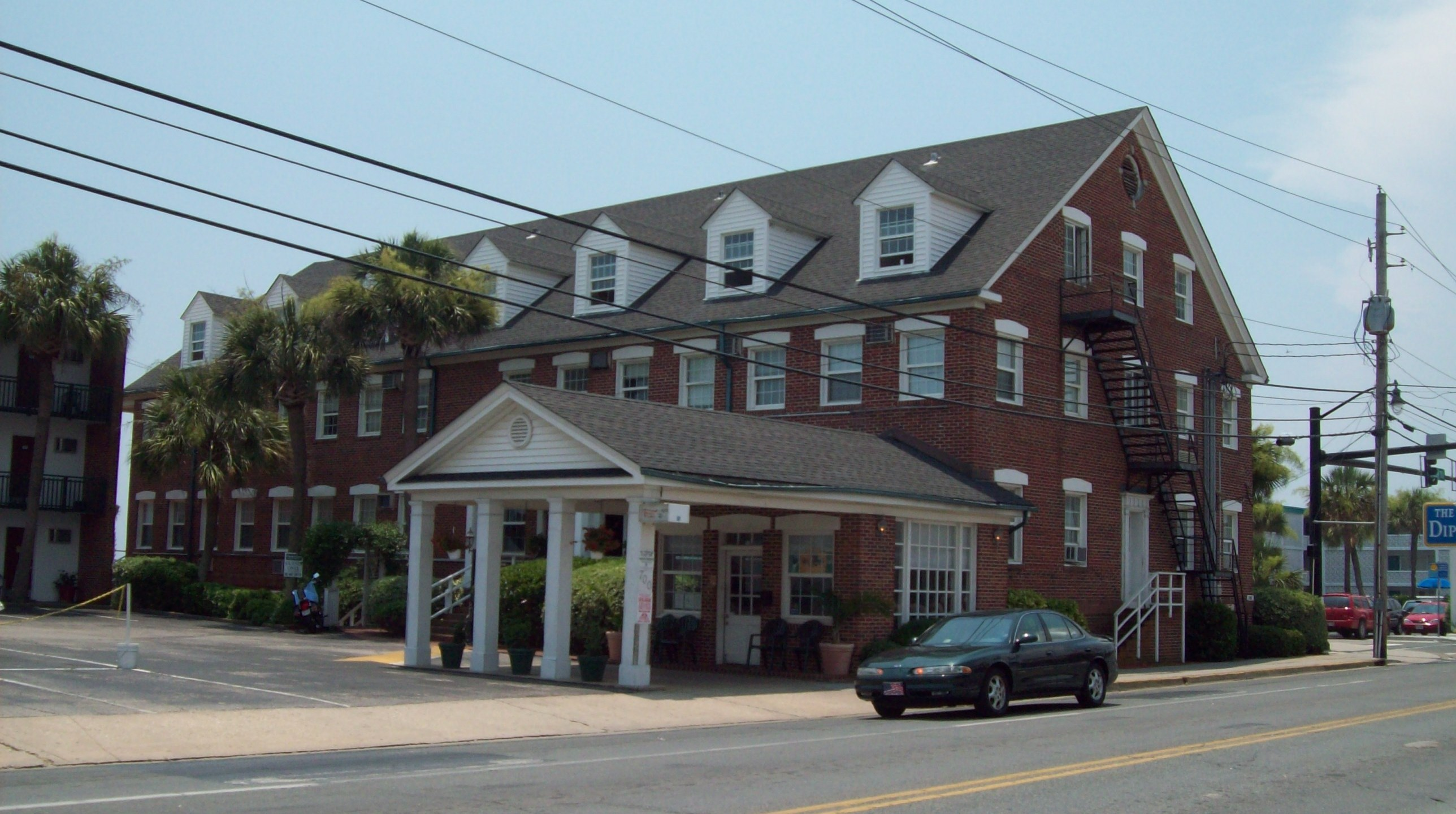
Streetside view

The original Chesterfield was a five-room house built in 1936 by Steven Chapman of Chesterfield, South Carolina. That house burned and was replaced in 1946. Clay Brittain, whose uncle built the brick building, worked there as a teenager and became an owner in 1965, running the hotel until 1991. In April 2002, Parkside Inn & Suites of Anaheim, California bought the inn and improved it after Centura Bank foreclosed.

By 2004, Karon Mitchell and her family owned the Chesterfield. In 2009, Mitchell announced plans to tear down the inn for a mini golf course to accompany the new Myrtle Beach Boardwalk.

The plan was delayed by the economic downturn, but by the end of June 2012 demolition was scheduled. People who wanted artifacts were able to collect them on June 19, 2012. The mini golf course was scheduled to open the following March.

On August 22, 2012, the Chesterfield Inn was demolished by construction crews. Shark Attack Adventure Golf opened on the site in Spring 2013, with bricks from the old inn painted with the green and white "Chesterfield" sign, both as part of the development and for sale. Part of the mini-golf course used the inn's basement. Hammerhead Grill followed in June, with tables made from the inn's floors, and inn-related items on display. On March 1, 2017, Joshua Laniado, who bought the property in February after the miniature golf course closed, announced a mixed-use development might be built on the site. Ocean Escape Boardwalk Oceanfront had its grand opening February 1, 2026. It included condos for short-term stays, and work was still planned on retail and commercial spaces.

== See also ==
- List of hotels
