= .pg =

Internet country code top-level domain for Papua New Guinea

- Introduced: 26 September 1991
- TLD type: Country code top-level domain
- Status: Active
- Registry: Papua New Guinea University of Technology
- Sponsor: Papua New Guinea University of Technology
- Intended use: Entities connected with Papua New Guinea
- Actual use: Gets some use in Papua New Guinea
- Registration restrictions: Must have local presence or interests in Papua New Guinea
- Structure: Registrations are made at the third level beneath some second-level labels
- Documents: Policy
- Dispute policies: Similar to pre-2000 Network Solutions dispute policy
- Registry website: Unitech DNS

.pg is the Internet country code top-level domain (ccTLD) for Papua New Guinea.

Registrations are made beneath the second-level names .com.pg, .net.pg, .ac.pg, .gov.pg, .mil.pg, and .org.pg.

The dispute resolution policy is similar to that of Network Solutions prior to the institution of the UDRP in 2000; a trademark owner can object to a domain registration and this will result in the domain being placed on hold unless the registrant can also demonstrate trademark rights (and post bond to indemnify the registry), or else get a court ruling in their favor.
