= West Chesterfield Historic District =

Historic district in Massachusetts, United States

- U.S. National Register of Historic Places
- U.S. Historic district
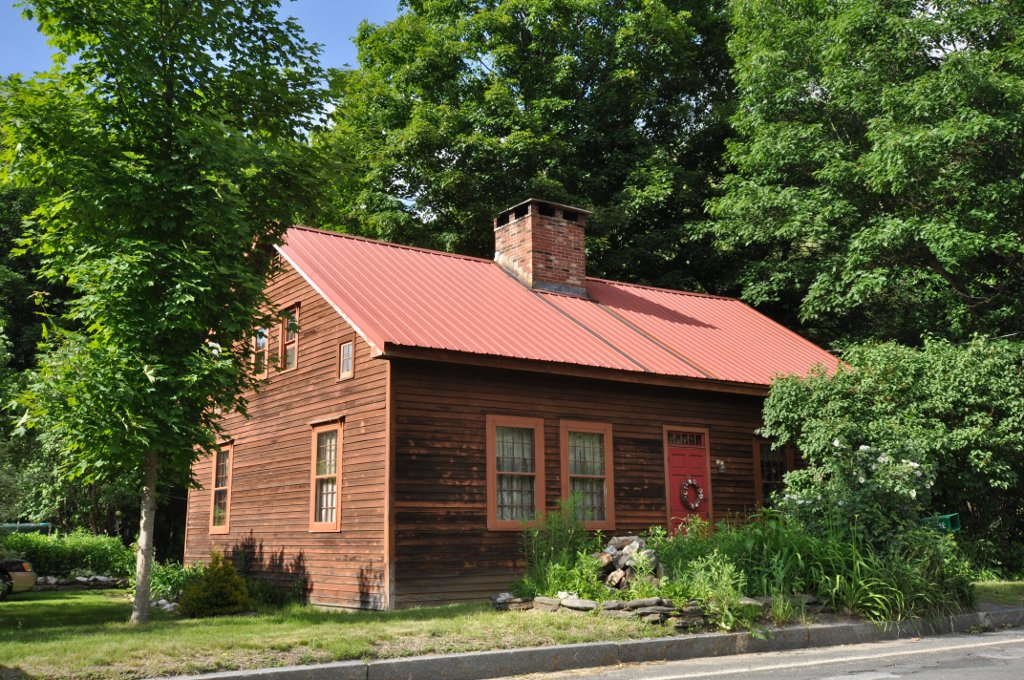
- 632 Main Street

- Location within Massachusetts Location within the United States
- Location: 1-70 Ireland St. and unnumbered lots, 620-669 Main Rd., section of Cummington Rd., Chesterfield, Massachusetts
- Coordinates: 42°24′12″N 72°52′37″W
- NRHP reference No.: 08000950
- Added to NRHP: September 25, 2008

The West Chesterfield Historic District is a historic district that encompasses the 19th century industrial and residential heritage of the village of West Chesterfield in the town of Chesterfield, Massachusetts. Centered at the junction of Main Road and Ireland Street, it was one of the town's main industrial sites for many years. The district was listed on the National Register of Historic Places in 2008.

== Description and history ==
West Chesterfield was one of the first parts of Chesterfield to be settled in the 1760s. The east-west Main Road (Massachusetts Route 143) was laid out on the route of a Native American trail in 1760, and Ireland Street was laid out in 1762, continuing north from its junction with Main Road toward Cummington as Cummington Road. The industrial history of the area begins in the 1770s with Elisha Bisbee's grist mill (not surviving). Further mills and small industry were built on both sides of the East Branch Westfield River, mainly south of Main Road, during the 19th century. Fire and flood prompted rebuilding of various businesses, one of which, the Healy Company, operated well into the 20th century.

The historic district is centered at the junction of Main Road and Ireland Street in the central western part of Chesterfield. Ireland Street runs along the Westfield River, which provided the water power used by the industrial facilities in the district. Most of the contributing elements of the district date to the 19th century, although some (most notably the 1948 West Chesterfield Bridge) fall outside that time. There are many industrial archeological remnants of mills that were established in the early years of the 19th century, as well as visible remnants of the waterworks (canals, raceways, and dams) that were used to bring power into the mill buildings. None of the 19th century mill buildings have survived, although foundations and other archeological remains are visible. The only major civic structure in the district is the Colonial Revival Herbert Franklin Dunham Library, built 1921. Residential architecture in the area is dominated by the Greek Revival, and is predominantly wood-frame in construction.

== See also ==
- Chesterfield Center Historic District
- National Register of Historic Places listings in Hampshire County, Massachusetts
