= National Register of Historic Places listings in Norfolk, Virginia =

423 w York st 23510 cairo building

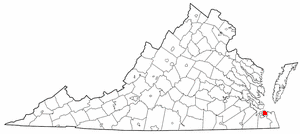
Location of Norfolk in Virginia

This is intended to be a complete list of the properties and districts on the National Register of Historic Places in the independent city of Norfolk, Virginia, United States. The locations of National Register properties and districts for which the latitude and longitude coordinates are included below may be seen in an online map.

There are 66 properties and districts listed on the National Register in the city. Another 3 properties were once listed but have been removed.

This National Park Service list is complete through NPS recent listings posted January 9, 2026.

== Current listings ==
| | Name on the Register | Image | Date listed | Location | Description |
|---|---|---|---|---|---|
| 1 | Allmand-Archer House | Allmand-Archer House | September 22, 1971 (#71001056) | 327 Duke St. 36°51′06″N 76°17′34″W | |
| 2 | American Cigar Company | American Cigar Company | September 3, 2009 (#09000690) | 1148 E. Princess Anne Rd. 36°51′21″N 76°16′14″W | Demolished in 2017 |
| 3 | Attucks Theatre | Attucks Theatre | September 16, 1982 (#82004575) | 1008-1012 Church St. 36°51′24″N 76°16′44″W | |
| 4 | Ballentine Place Historic District | Ballentine Place Historic District | May 22, 2003 (#03000459) | Roughly bounded by Cromwell Ave., Cape Henry Ave., McKann Ave., and Lafayette Boulevard; 36°52′01″N 76°15′11″W | |
| 5 | Berkley North Historic District | Berkley North Historic District | November 22, 2000 (#00001440) | Roughly bounded by Bellamy Ave., Pescara Creek, Berkley Ave., and Interstate 464; also Bellamy Avenue, Hough Avenue, E Indian River Road, Hardy Avenue, Poplar Avenue, Patrick Street, State Street, S Main Street, Dinwiddie Street, Stafford Street, Fauquier Street; 36°50′05″N 76°16′55″W | Second set of addresses represent a boundary decrease approved April 15, 2025. |
| 6 | Boush-Tazewell House | Boush-Tazewell House | July 18, 1974 (#74002238) | 6225 Powhatan Ave. 36°54′01″N 76°18′50″W | |
| 7 | Chesterfield Heights Historic District | Chesterfield Heights Historic District | June 10, 2003 (#03000443) | Roughly bounded by the East Branch Elizabeth River, Ballentine Boulevard, Sedgewick St., and Interstate 264; 36°50′34″N 76°15′28″W | |
| 8 | Christ and St. Luke's Church | Christ and St. Luke's Church | June 18, 1979 (#79003286) | 560 W. Olney Rd. 36°51′36″N 76°17′52″W | |
| 9 | Colonial Place | Colonial Place | May 22, 2002 (#02000532) | Roughly bounded by the Lafayette River, Knitting Mill Creek, East Haven Creek, and 38th St. 36°53′05″N 76°17′20″W | |
| 10 | Cruser Place Historic District | Cruser Place Historic District | May 13, 2021 (#100006501) | Granby, Llewellyn, 39th and 38th Sts., Delaware, Pennsylvania, Maryland, and LaValette Aves. 36°53′01″N 76°17′21″W | |
| 11 | J. Eugene Diggs House | J. Eugene Diggs House | December 9, 2020 (#100005897) | 2509 E. Virginia Beach Boulevard; 36°51′07″N 76°15′38″W | |
| 12 | Downtown Norfolk Financial Historic District | | June 26, 2023 (#100009071) | Bounded by East Main, East Plume, Bank, and Atlantic Sts., Commercial Pl., St. Paul's Blvd., Waterside Dr. and the Elizabeth R. 36°50′46″N 76°17′30″W | |
| 13 | Downtown Norfolk Historic District | Downtown Norfolk Historic District | March 20, 1987 (#87000475) | Granby, Main, and Plume Sts., City Hall Ave., and Bank St.; also Granby, Freemason, Charlotte, Bute, and York Sts., College Pl., and Monticello Ave. 36°50′58″N 76°17′28″W | Second set of boundaries represents a boundary increase of May 30, 2001 |
| 14 | Elmwood Cemetery | Elmwood Cemetery | August 27, 2013 (#13000643) | 238 E. Princess Anne Rd. 36°51′42″N 76°16′57″W | |
| 15 | Epworth United Methodist Church | Epworth United Methodist Church | August 21, 1997 (#97000955) | 124 W. Freemason St. 36°51′06″N 76°17′27″W | |
| 16 | First Baptist Church | First Baptist Church | July 21, 1983 (#83003297) | 418 E. Bute St. 36°51′10″N 76°17′03″W | |
| 17 | First Calvary Baptist Church | First Calvary Baptist Church | October 15, 1987 (#87001853) | 1036-1040 Wide St. 36°51′24″N 76°16′39″W | |
| 18 | Fort Norfolk | Fort Norfolk | October 29, 1976 (#76002225) | 803 Front St. 36°51′25″N 76°18′22″W | |
| 19 | Freemason Street Baptist Church | Freemason Street Baptist Church | September 22, 1971 (#71001057) | Northeastern corner of Freemason and Bank Sts. 36°51′02″N 76°17′13″W | |
| 20 | Ghent Historic District | Ghent Historic District | July 4, 1980 (#80004455) | Roughly bounded by Olney Rd., Virginia Beach Boulevard, Smith's Creek, and Brambleton Ave. 36°51′24″N 76°17′50″W | |
| 21 | Granby Street Suburban Institutional Corridor | | February 12, 2024 (#100009735) | Granby Street, Newport Avenue, Seekel Street, Thole Street; 36°54′23″N 76°16′34″W | |
| 22 | James Blair Junior High School | James Blair Junior High School | February 4, 2000 (#00000068) | 730 Spotswood Ave. 36°52′07″N 76°17′47″W | |
| 23 | Jamestown Exposition Site Buildings | Jamestown Exposition Site Buildings | October 20, 1975 (#75002114) | Bounded by Bacon, Powhatan, Farragut, Gilbert, Bainbridge, and the harbor 36°57′02″N 76°18′49″W | |
| 24 | Kenmure | Kenmure | June 1, 1988 (#88000601) | 420 W. Bute St. 36°51′10″N 76°17′49″W | |
| 25 | Lafayette Grammar and High School | Lafayette Grammar and High School | February 10, 1983 (#83003298) | 3109 Tidewater Dr. 36°52′37″N 76°15′52″W | |
| 26 | Lafayette Residence Park | Lafayette Residence Park | January 27, 1999 (#99000071) | Roughly bounded by Tidewater Dr., Dupont Creek, Fontainbleau Crescent, La Salle Ave., Orleans Creek, and the Lafayette River; 36°52′37″N 76°16′00″W | |
| 27 | Lambert's Point Knitting Mill (122-0934) | Lambert's Point Knitting Mill (122-0934) | February 1, 2006 (#05001585) | 808 W. 44th St. 36°53′05″N 76°17′44″W | |
| 28 | Monticello Arcade | Monticello Arcade | May 21, 1975 (#75002115) | In the 200 block of E. City Hall Ave., between City Hall Ave. and Plume St. 36°50′50″N 76°17′27″W | |
| 29 | Moses Myers House | Moses Myers House | February 16, 1970 (#70000874) | Southwestern corner of E. Freemason and N. Bank Sts. 36°51′01″N 76°17′15″W | |
| 30 | Norfolk Academy | Norfolk Academy | November 12, 1969 (#69000343) | 420 Bank St. 36°51′04″N 76°17′09″W | |
| 31 | Norfolk and Western Railroad Historic District | Norfolk and Western Railroad Historic District | May 18, 2015 (#15000253) | Parts of 21st through 27th Sts., Bowden's Ferry Rd., and Colley, Colonial, Debree, Llewellyn, Monticello Aves. 36°52′19″N 76°17′32″W | |
| 32 | Norfolk Auto Row Historic District | Norfolk Auto Row Historic District | August 25, 2014 (#14000529) | Roughly bounded by E. 14th, Boush, and Granby Sts., and Monticello and W. Brambleton Aves. 36°51′22″N 76°17′18″W | Boundary increase approved March 8, 2019 |
| 33 | Norfolk Botanical Garden | Norfolk Botanical Garden | August 17, 2005 (#05000895) | 6700 Azalea Garden Rd. 36°54′12″N 76°12′12″W | |
| 34 | Norfolk City Hall | Norfolk City Hall | March 16, 1972 (#72001511) | 421 E. City Hall Ave. 36°50′51″N 76°17′19″W | Current home of the General Douglas MacArthur Memorial |
| 35 | Norfolk Cultural and Convention Center | | January 15, 2026 (#100012543) | 201 E. Brambleton Ave; 36°51′14″N 76°17′12″W | |
| 36 | Norfolk Fire Department Station No. 12 | Norfolk Fire Department Station No. 12 | June 11, 2020 (#100005281) | 1650 W. Little Creek Rd. 36°54′59″N 76°18′25″W | |
| 37 | North Ghent | North Ghent | July 11, 2001 (#01000693) | Bounded by Princess Anne Rd., Olney Rd., Colonial Ave., and Colley Ave. 36°51′45″N 76°17′53″W | |
| 38 | Old Norfolk City Hall | Old Norfolk City Hall | October 29, 1981 (#81000674) | 235 E. Plume St. 36°50′48″N 76°17′25″W | Also known as the Seaboard building and a former U.S. Post Office. Today this is part of the Slover branch of the Norfolk Public Library. A glass atrium was built to adjoin it to the neighboring Selden Arcade. |
| 39 | Park Place Historic District | Park Place Historic District | February 10, 2006 (#06000029) | Roughly bounded by Hampton Boulevard, 23rd St., Granby St., and 38th St. 36°52′29″N 76°17′28″W | Boundary increase approved June 5, 2017 |
| 40 | Poplar Hall | Poplar Hall | November 7, 1997 (#97001402) | 400 Stuart Cir. 36°50′45″N 76°13′19″W | |
| 41 | Queen Street Baptist Church | Queen Street Baptist Church | March 15, 2006 (#06000141) | 413 Brambleton Ave. 36°51′12″N 76°17′02″W | |
| 42 | Riverview | Riverview | September 24, 1999 (#99001198) | Roughly bounded by LaVallette Ave., Beach Ave. on the Lafayette River, and Columbus Ave. 36°52′58″N 76°16′45″W | |
| 43 | St. John's African Methodist Episcopal Church | St. John's African Methodist Episcopal Church | December 4, 1986 (#86003441) | 539-545 E. Bute St. 36°51′08″N 76°16′56″W | |
| 44 | Saint Mary's Catholic Cemetery | Saint Mary's Catholic Cemetery | July 13, 2001 (#01000694) | 3000 Church St. 36°52′28″N 76°16′49″W | |
| 45 | St. Mary's Church | St. Mary's Church | May 25, 1979 (#79003287) | 232 Chapel St. 36°50′50″N 76°16′57″W | |
| 46 | St. Paul's Church | St. Paul's Church | July 2, 1971 (#71001058) | 201 St. Paul's Boulevard; 36°50′52″N 76°17′07″W | |
| 47 | St. Peter's Episcopal Church | St. Peter's Episcopal Church | July 8, 2010 (#10000445) | 1625 Brown Ave. 36°50′37″N 76°16′24″W | |
| 48 | Seaboard Air Line Railway Building | Seaboard Air Line Railway Building | February 5, 2013 (#12001271) | 221-229 W. Bute St. 36°51′10″N 76°17′30″W | Also known as the Wainwright Building or Wainwright Downtown, a luxury apartment building. |
| 49 | Security Storage and Safe Deposit Company Warehouse | Security Storage and Safe Deposit Company Warehouse | November 19, 2014 (#14000948) | 517-523 Front St. 36°51′15″N 76°18′01″W | |
| 50 | Southern Bagging Company | Southern Bagging Company | August 8, 2007 (#07000804) | 1900 Monticello Ave. 36°51′56″N 76°17′01″W | |
| 51 | Talbot Hall | Talbot Hall | February 2, 2016 (#15001041) | 600 Talbot Hall Rd., 6601 Caroline St., and 6651 Talbot Hall Ct. 36°54′12″N 76°17′14″W | |
| 52 | Talbot Park Apartments | | May 5, 2025 (#100011772) | 118 Warren Street; 36°54′34″N 76°16′39″W | |
| 53 | Taylor-Whittle House | Taylor-Whittle House | September 22, 1971 (#71001059) | 225 W. Freemason St. 36°51′07″N 76°17′32″W | |
| 54 | U.S. Customhouse | U.S. Customhouse | April 17, 1970 (#70000901) | 101 E. Main St. 36°50′46″N 76°17′32″W | |
| 55 | US Post Office and Courthouse | US Post Office and Courthouse | October 10, 1984 (#84000098) | 600 Granby St. 36°51′13″N 76°17′18″W | |
| 56 | USS WISCONSIN (BB-64) battleship | USS WISCONSIN (BB-64) battleship | March 28, 2012 (#12000178) | 1 Waterside Dr. 36°50′54″N 76°17′44″W | |
| 57 | Virginia Bank and Trust Building | Virginia Bank and Trust Building | February 23, 1984 (#84003553) | 101 Granby St. 36°50′48″N 76°17′33″W | |
| 58 | Virginia Ice & Freezing Corporation Cold Storage Warehouse | Virginia Ice & Freezing Corporation Cold Storage Warehouse | November 13, 2009 (#09000922) | 835 Southampton Ave. 36°51′30″N 76°18′23″W | |
| 59 | Virginia National Bank Headquarters Historic District | Virginia National Bank Headquarters Historic District | August 15, 2016 (#16000535) | Bounded by Commercial Place, Waterside Dr., and E. Plume and Atlantic Sts. 36°50′44″N 76°17′23″W | Also known as Bank of America Center (Norfolk, Virginia) and as of 2017, Icon Norfolk (luxury apartments) |
| 60 | Wells Theatre | Wells Theatre | May 19, 1980 (#80004312) | Tazewell St. and Monticello Ave. 36°50′57″N 76°17′25″W | |
| 61 | West Freemason Street Area Historic District | West Freemason Street Area Historic District | November 7, 1972 (#72001512) | Both sides of Bute and Freemason Sts. between the Elizabeth River and York and Duke Sts. 36°51′08″N 76°17′40″W | |
| 62 | West Point Cemetery | West Point Cemetery | May 3, 2007 (#07000393) | 238 E. Princess Anne Rd. 36°51′40″N 76°17′06″W | |
| 63 | Williamston-Woodland Historic District | Williamston-Woodland Historic District | August 25, 2014 (#14000530) | Roughly bounded by the Norfolk Southern railroad line and Church, 18th, and Omohundro Sts. 36°51′58″N 76°16′59″W | |
| 64 | Willoughby-Baylor House | Willoughby-Baylor House | September 22, 1971 (#71001060) | 601 Freemason St. 36°50′59″N 76°17′08″W | |
| 65 | Winona | Winona | July 5, 2001 (#01000702) | Roughly bounded by Ashland Circle, Ashland Ave., Elmere Place, Huntington Crescent, Holland Ave., and the Lafayette River; 36°52′51″N 76°16′10″W | |
| 66 | Zion Methodist Church | Zion Methodist Church | April 4, 2007 (#07000274) | 2729 Bowden's Ferry Rd. 36°52′42″N 76°18′14″W | |

== Former listings ==
| | Name on the Register | Image | Date listed | Date removed | Location | City or town | Description |
|---|---|---|---|---|---|---|---|
| 1 | Christ Church | | August 19, 1971 (#71001064) | May 22, 1973 | 421 East Freemason Street | Norfolk | Demolished in January 1973 |
| 2 | Walter Herron Taylor Elementary School | | August 13, 1998 (#98001067) | March 19, 2001 | 1410 Claremont Avenue | Norfolk | Demolished in June 1999 |
| 3 | Huntington (Tugboat) | Huntington (Tugboat) | August 5, 1999 (#99000958) | February 7, 2017 | 1 Waterside Dr. – Nauticus Pier | Norfolk | Scrapped, except for the museum-held pilot house |
| 4 | John T. West School | | March 31, 2000 (#00000315) | September 27, 2006 | 1435 Bolton Street | Norfolk | Demolished in August, 2006. |

== See also ==
- List of National Historic Landmarks in Virginia
- National Register of Historic Places listings in Virginia
