= Highland Park, Norfolk, Virginia =

Coordinates: 36.885542°N 76.298184°W

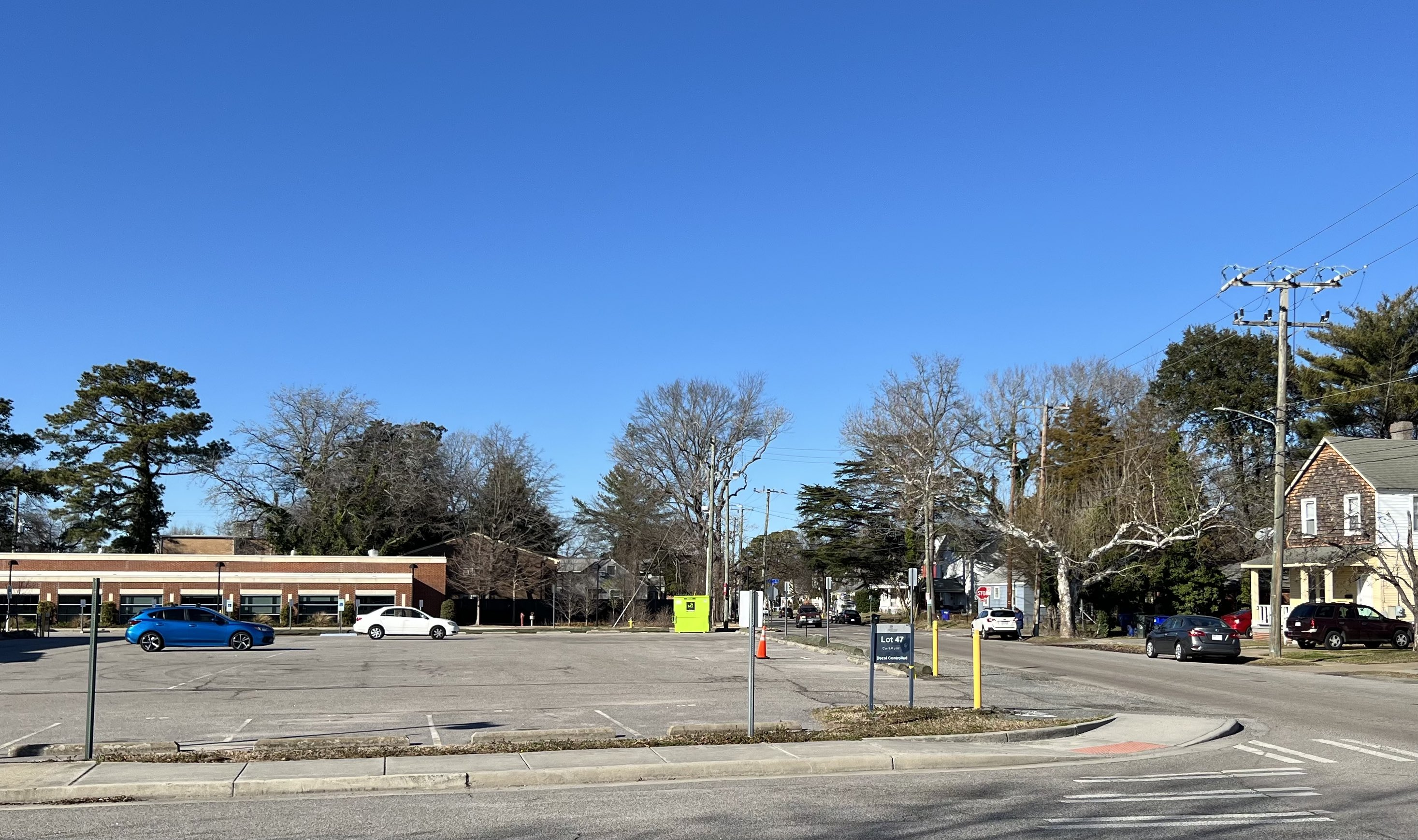
Highland Park.

Highland Park is an area home to both residents and businesses in Norfolk, Virginia.

== Location ==
Highland Park's northern border of Larchmont-Edgewater runs from the corner of Hampton Boulevard and 49th Street to where Colley Avenue crosses 52nd Street and the Lafayette River. Old Dominion University borders Highland Park to the west, while 38th Street creates a border for Park Place, Norfolk, Virginia. The eastern border is created by the Lafayette River, which separates the area from Colonial Place. Both Hampton Boulevard and Colley Avenue run parallel to each other, allowing those traveling from Highland Park direct routes to other notable parts of the city including Ghent via Colley Avenue, and Naval Station Norfolk located at Sewell's Point, via Hampton Boulevard.

== Relationship with Old Dominion University ==
Due to Highland Park's close proximity to Old Dominion University, the university and its students affect the area in various ways. Many students choose to rent in the area, and students in Highland Park are able to take a shuttle bus directly to and from the Old Dominion University's campus. Beginning in 2009, Highland Park has also had to adjust to gatherings such as tailgate parties and pep rallies at residences across the area due to Old Dominion University's recent addition of football games. In addition, Old Dominion University's Police Officers share jurisdiction with the Norfolk Police in patrolling the area and responding to calls within a one-mile radius of the university, in which Highland Park lies.
