= Norfolk and Western Railroad Historic District =

Historic district in Virginia, United States

- U.S. National Register of Historic Places
- U.S. Historic district
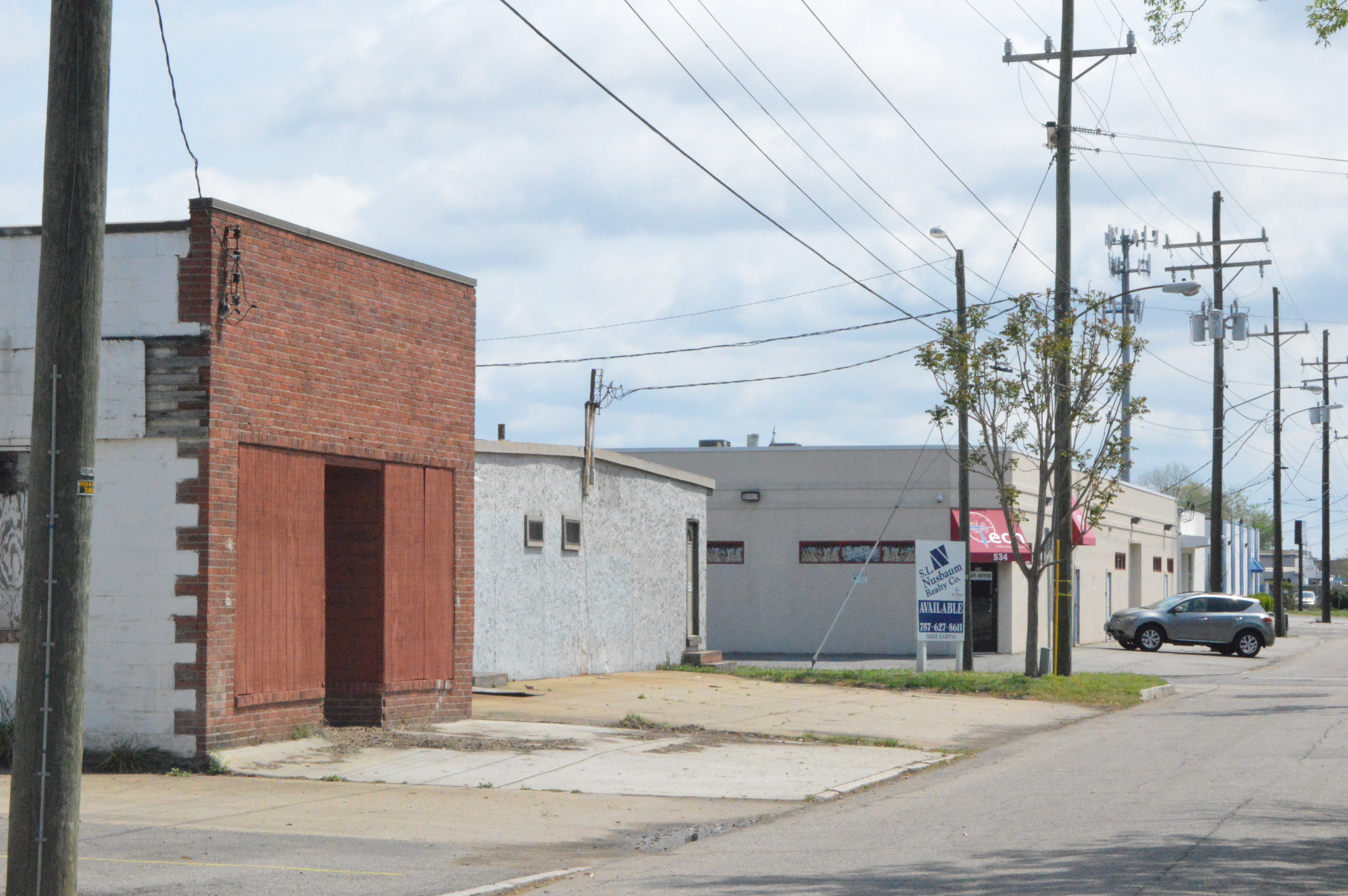
- Warehouses on 24th Street

- Location within Virginia Location within the United States
- Location: Parts of 21st through 27th Sts., Bowden's Ferry Rd., Colley, Colonial, Debree, Llewellyn, Monticello Aves., Norfolk, Virginia
- Coordinates: 36°52′24″N 76°17′38″W
- Area: 167 acres (68 ha)
- NRHP reference No.: 15000253
- Added to NRHP: May 18, 2015

The Norfolk and Western Railroad Historic District encompasses an historic industrial district of Norfolk, Virginia. Centered on the tracks of the Norfolk and Western Railroad between Bowden's Ferry Road and Monticello Avenue, it extends as much as three blocks north and south of the tracks, including within its bounds most of the industrial resources found in that area. This area was developed roughly between 1890 and the 1930s, and includes fine examples of late 19th century commercial brick architecture, and a few fine examples of Art Deco styling. The district partially overlaps the Park Place Historic District to the north, and the Williamston-Woodland Historic District to the south.

The district was listed on the National Register of Historic Places in 2015.

== See also ==
- National Register of Historic Places listings in Norfolk, Virginia
