= Park Place Historic District =

Park Place Historic District may refer to:

- Park Place Historic District (Cloquet, Minnesota), listed on the National Register of Historic Places in Carlton County, Minnesota
- Park Place Historic District (Brooklyn) - Designated in 2012 by the New York City Landmarks Preservations Commission
- Park Place Historic District (Niagara Falls, New York), listed on the National Register of Historic Places in Niagara County, New York
- Park Place Historic District (Norfolk, Virginia), listed on the National Register of Historic Places in Norfolk, Virginia
