= Larchmont-Edgewater =

Residential neighborhood in Norfolk, Virginia

Coordinates: 36.894428°N 76.305141°W

Larchmont-Edgewater is a residential neighborhood in Norfolk, Virginia, located approximately five miles north of downtown. It was mostly Norfolk County farmland when it was founded in 1906.

The neighborhood sits astride Hampton Boulevard north of 49th street, and is bordered by the Lafayette River to the east and north, the Elizabeth River to the west, and Old Dominion University, Highland Park, and 52nd Street to the south. Major neighborhood streets include Jamestown Crescent, Powhatan Avenue, Bolling Avenue and Magnolia Avenue. This is also one of the foremost neighborhoods in the city of Norfolk.

The headquarters for the Hampton Roads area PBS affiliate, WHRO-TV, and its sister radio stations WHRO-FM and WHRV, are located in the neighborhood.
