= Security Storage and Safe Deposit Company Warehouse =

- U.S. National Register of Historic Places
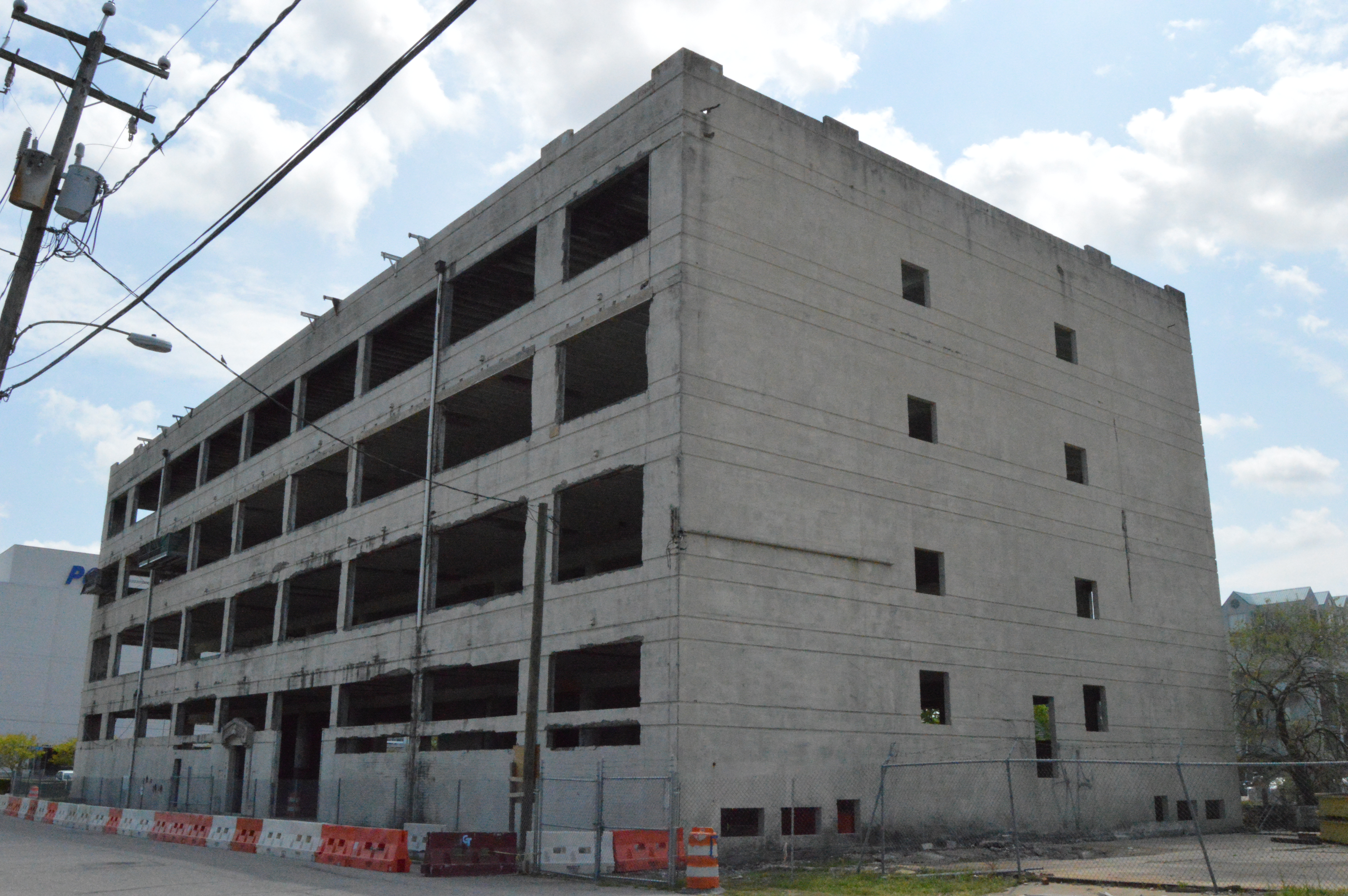
- Front and western side

- Location within Virginia Location within the United States
- Location: 517-523 Front St., Norfolk, Virginia
- Coordinates: 36°51′15″N 76°18′2″W
- Area: Less than 1 acre (0.40 ha)
- Built: 1916
- Architect: Benjamin Franklin Mitchell
- Architectural style: Early Commercial
- NRHP reference No.: 14000948
- Added to NRHP: November 19, 2014

The Security Storage and Safe Deposit Company Warehouse is a historic storage facility at 517-523 Front Street in Norfolk, Virginia. It is a large concrete structure with four levels of storage, and was built in 1916. It is a rare survivor in an area that once had many warehouses, and is distinctive for its subdued decorations, which differentiate it from otherwise nondescript brick or concrete warehouses.

The warehouse was listed on the National Register of Historic Places in 2014.

== See also ==
- National Register of Historic Places listings in Norfolk, Virginia
