= James Blair Junior High School =

Historic school building in Virginia, US

- U.S. National Register of Historic Places
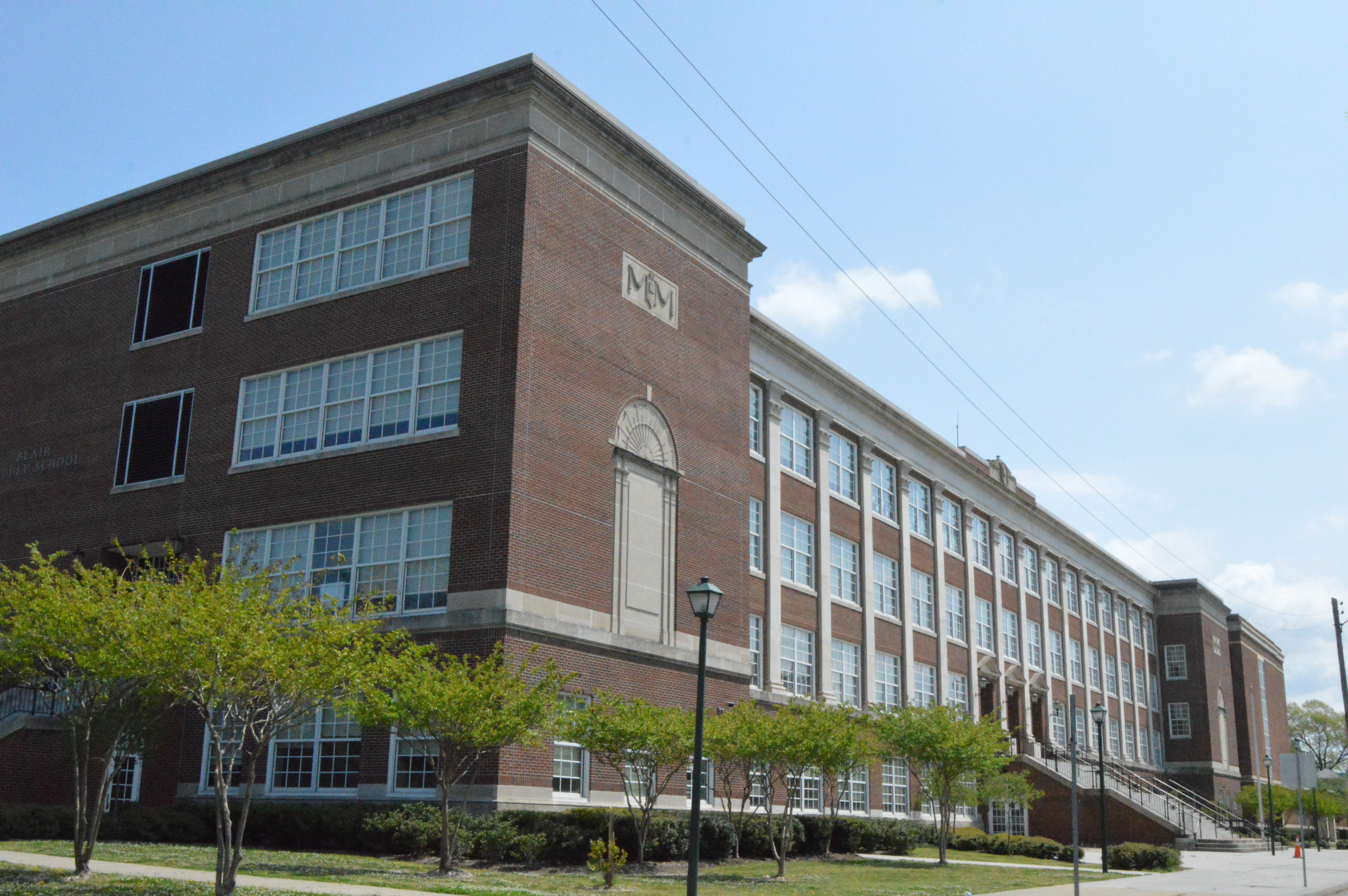

- Location within Virginia Location within the United States
- Location: 730 Spotswood Ave., Norfolk, Virginia
- Coordinates: 36°52′5″N 76°17′49″W
- Area: 5 acres (2.0 ha)
- Built: 1921
- Architectural style: Beaux Arts
- NRHP reference No.: 00000068
- Added to NRHP: February 4, 2000

The James Blair Middle School, formerly the James Blair Junior High School, is a historic school building at 730 Spotswood Avenue in Norfolk, Virginia. Its original main block is a three-story brick building with limestone trim, and Beaux Arts styling. Built in 1922 to a design by the local architectural firm of Calrow, Wrenn, and Tazewell, it was the first junior high school to be built by the city school administration. The school is named for James Blair, one of the founders of Virginia's College of William and Mary, and was converted to a middle school in the 1980s.

The building was listed on the National Register of Historic Places in 2000.

== See also ==
- National Register of Historic Places listings in Norfolk, Virginia
