= Norfolk Auto Row Historic District =

Historic district in Virginia, United States

- U.S. National Register of Historic Places
- U.S. Historic district
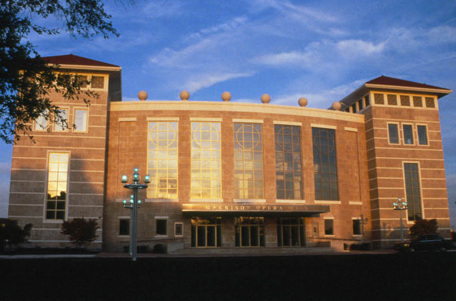
- The Harrison Opera House

- Location within Virginia Location within the United States
- Location: Roughly bounded by E. 14th, Llewellyn Ave., Boush & Granby Sts., Monticello & W. Brambleton Aves., Norfolk, Virginia
- Coordinates: 36°51′29″N 76°17′22″W
- Area: 53.7 acres (21.7 ha)
- NRHP reference No.: 14000529 (original); 100003483 (increase)

Significant dates
- Added to NRHP: August 25, 2014
- Boundary increase: March 8, 2019

The Norfolk Auto Row Historic District encompasses a commercial district just outside the downtown area of Norfolk, Virginia. The area is bounded on the south by West Brambleton Avenue, on the east by Monticello Avenue, on the north by East 13th Street, and on the west by Llewelllyn Avenue and Granby and Boush streets. The area was originally developed as a low-income housing area early in the 20th century, but was by the mid-20th century completely transformed into an area of commercial development, mainly for the sales and service of automobiles. The district features buildings that are mostly one and two stories, although there is one 14-story skyscraper. One notable structure in the district is the Harrison Opera House, built in 1944 as an Army and Navy USO facility; it served as the city's major performance venue until it was eclipsed in 1970 by the construction of the Norfolk Scope arena.

The district was listed on the National Register of Historic Places in 2014, and was enlarged in 2019.

== See also ==
- National Register of Historic Places listings in Norfolk, Virginia
