= James Blair (clergyman) =

Scottish-born clergyman (1656–1743)

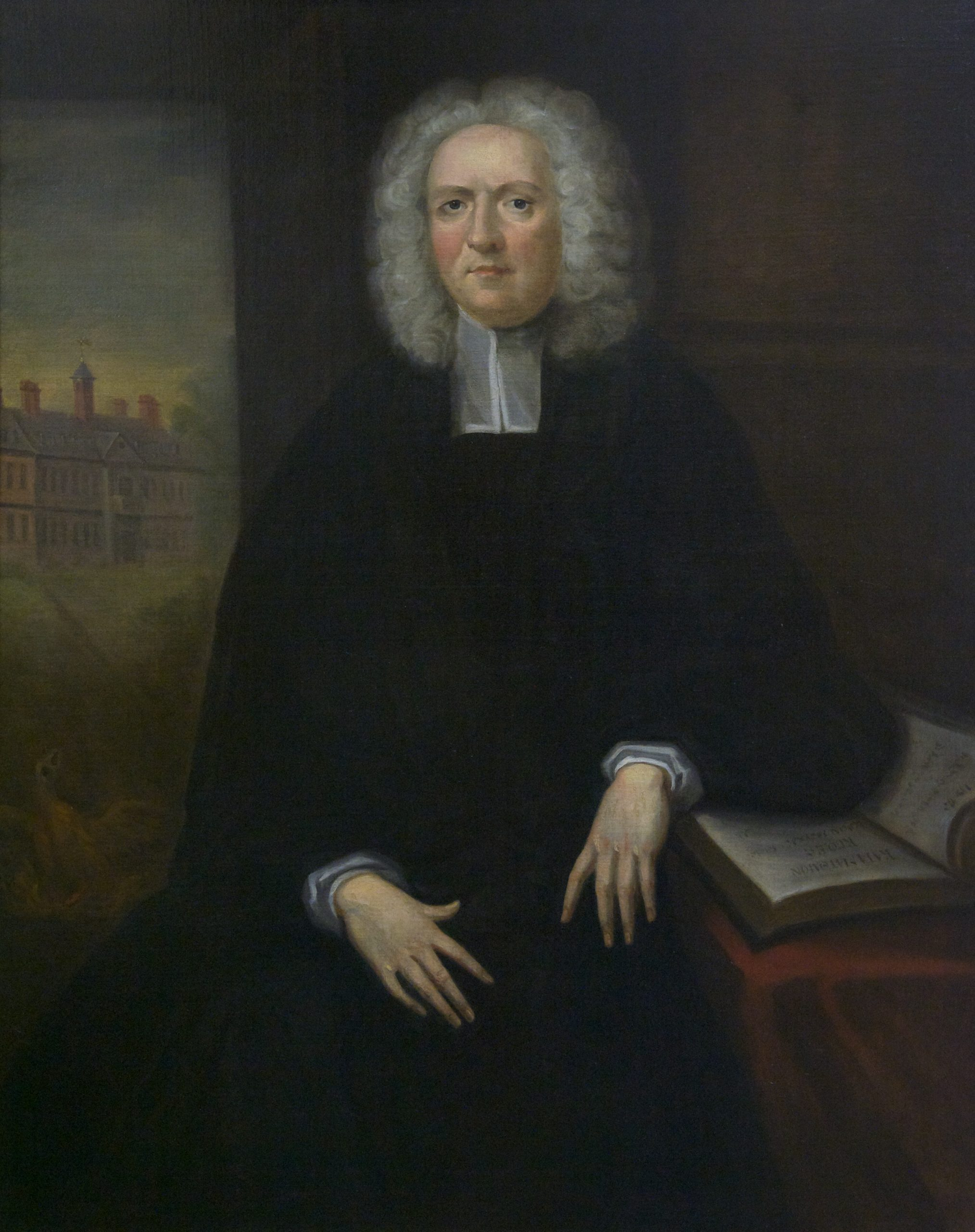
- Portrait by Charles Bridges, c. 1735–1743

1st President of the College of William & Mary
- In office 1693–1743
- Succeeded by: William Dawson

Personal details
- Born: 1656 Kingdom of Scotland
- Died: 18 April 1743 (aged 86–87) Williamsburg, Virginia
- Spouse: Sarah Harrison
- Education: University of Aberdeen; University of Edinburgh

James Blair (1656 – 18 April 1743) was a Scottish-born clergyman in the Church of England. He was also a missionary and an educator, best known as the founder of the College of William & Mary in Williamsburg, Virginia.

== Youth and education ==
James Blair was born in Scotland, possibly in Edinburgh or in Banffshire. His parents were Peter Blair, minister of St Cuthbert's, Edinburgh, and Mary Hamilton Blair. He was educated at Marischal College, University of Aberdeen and the University of Edinburgh, where he received a Master of Arts degree.

After completing his education, in 1679 he was ordained in the national Church of Scotland (known officially at this time as the Kirk of Scotland, see kirk). During the entire 17th century the Kirk had been experiencing passionate internal conflicts between Presbyterians and Episcopalians (see, for example, the Bishops' Wars). The Episcopalians were in the ascendancy during this period and the Church of Scotland was briefly aligned with the Church of England during the reign of Charles II of Scotland. Charles was a strong opponent of Presbyterianism and throughout his lifetime worked to reassert the strength of the Anglican Church.

In 1681, Blair, aligned with the Episcopalians, was deprived of his parish in Edinburgh due to the conflict within the Episcopal movement between those supporting the Roman Catholic Church and those advocating a continued independent Episcopal national church. Blair relocated to London later that year.

== Missionary to the Virginia Colony ==
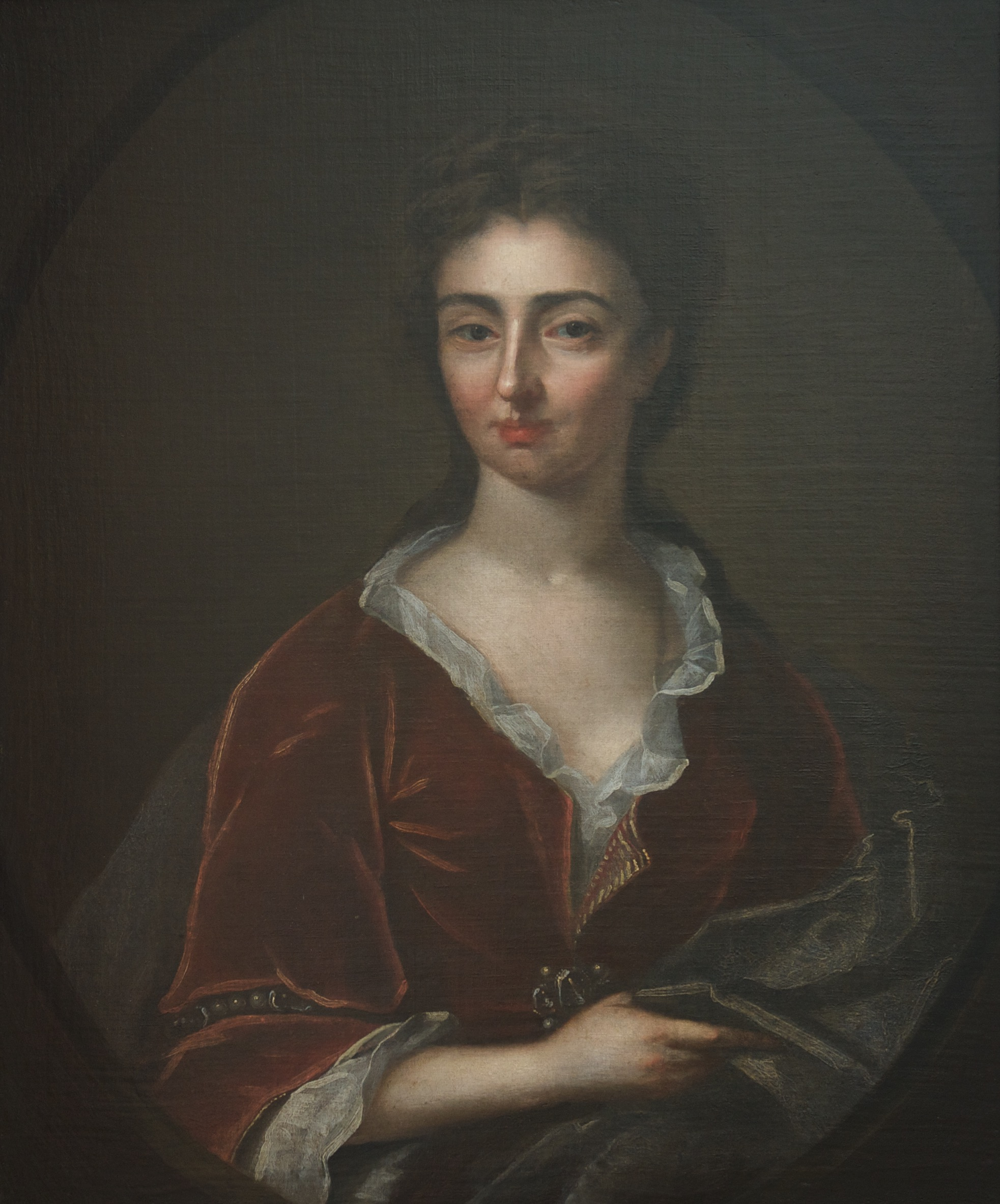
Sarah Harrison Blair

In London, 1685, he was ordained in the Church of England, and at the request of Henry Compton, the Bishop of London (responsible for the colonies), Blair travelled to the New World with a mission to "revive and reform the church in the Virginia Colony." His initial assignment was to serve as rector of the Parish of Henrico at Varina. He developed good relationships with prominent political families, such as the Harrison family. He married Sarah Harrison, daughter of Benjamin Harrison Jr., on 2 June 1687.

When John Clayton, Commissary in the Virginia Colony for the Bishop of London, returned to England after just two years of service, Blair succeeded him, making him the colony's highest-ranking religious leader, a position that he would hold for 54 years.

== College of William & Mary ==
The leaders of the Virginia Colony had long wanted school to give their sons higher education, as well as to educate the natives. An attempt to establish a permanent university at Henricus for these purposes around 1618 failed after the Indian massacre of 1622 wiped out the entire settlement, which was not rebuilt.

Almost 70 years later, with encouragement from the Colony's House of Burgesses and other prominent individuals, Blair prepared a plan, believed by some historians to be modelled after the earlier one from Henricus, and returned to England in 1691 to petition the monarchy for a new college. The Powhatan people had been largely decimated and reduced to reservations after the last major conflict in 1644, but the religious aspiration to educate them into Christianity was nevertheless retained, perhaps as a moral incentive to help gain support and approval in London. Moreover, the school would serve to train clergy born in the colonies for service among their neighbors.

The trip to London proved successful. Blair was supported in his efforts by John Tillotson, who was the Archbishop of Canterbury. (Protestants King William and Queen Mary II of England were reigning joint monarchs of Britain, having just deposed Catholic James II of England in 1688 during the Glorious Revolution.) In 1693, Blair received the charter of the College of William & Mary, named to honour both monarchs. Blair was made president of the new school for life. Blair's receipt of the charter was commemorated in 1772 by Thomas Pingo's design for the Botetourt Medal's reverse. He served for 50 years, from 1693 to 1743, and remains the longest serving president of the college and the sixth longest serving college president in US history.

After Blair returned to Virginia, the trustees of the new college bought a parcel of 330 acres (1.3 km^{2}) from Thomas Ballard for the new school. The location chosen was at Middle Plantation, a high point on the Virginia Peninsula so named because it was equidistant from the James and York Rivers. Middle Plantation had served as a defensive location during periodic conflicts with the Native Americans since its establishment in 1632. Blair established his home at nearby Rich Neck Plantation.

The college was given a seat in the House of Burgesses. Financial income was to come by taxation of a penny per pound on tobacco exported from Maryland and Virginia to countries other than England, and from other similar sources, such as an export duty on furs and animal skins. The new school opened in temporary buildings in 1694. Properly called the "College Building," the first version of the Wren Building was built at Middle Plantation beginning on 8 August 1695 and occupied by 1700. Today, the Wren Building is the oldest academic structure in continuous use in America. (Incidentally, it is called the "Wren Building" because tradition has it that the building was designed by the famed English architect Sir Christopher Wren who had designed St Paul's Cathedral in London. His actual involvement with the College Building completed in 1700 is disputed by some historians.)

== Capital of Virginia, Williamsburg ==
The State House at Jamestown burned for the third time in 1698, and as it had in the past, the legislature again took up temporary quarters at Middle Plantation. On 1 May 1699, Blair and five students of the College of William & Mary appeared before the House of Burgesses to suggest that they designate Middle Plantation (soon to be renamed Williamsburg in honour of King William III), as the new capital of Virginia. A month later, the legislators agreed.

Williamsburg served as the capital of Virginia for 81 years, until 1780, when the capital was moved to Richmond for security reasons at the outset of the American Revolution.

== Religious leadership, writing ==
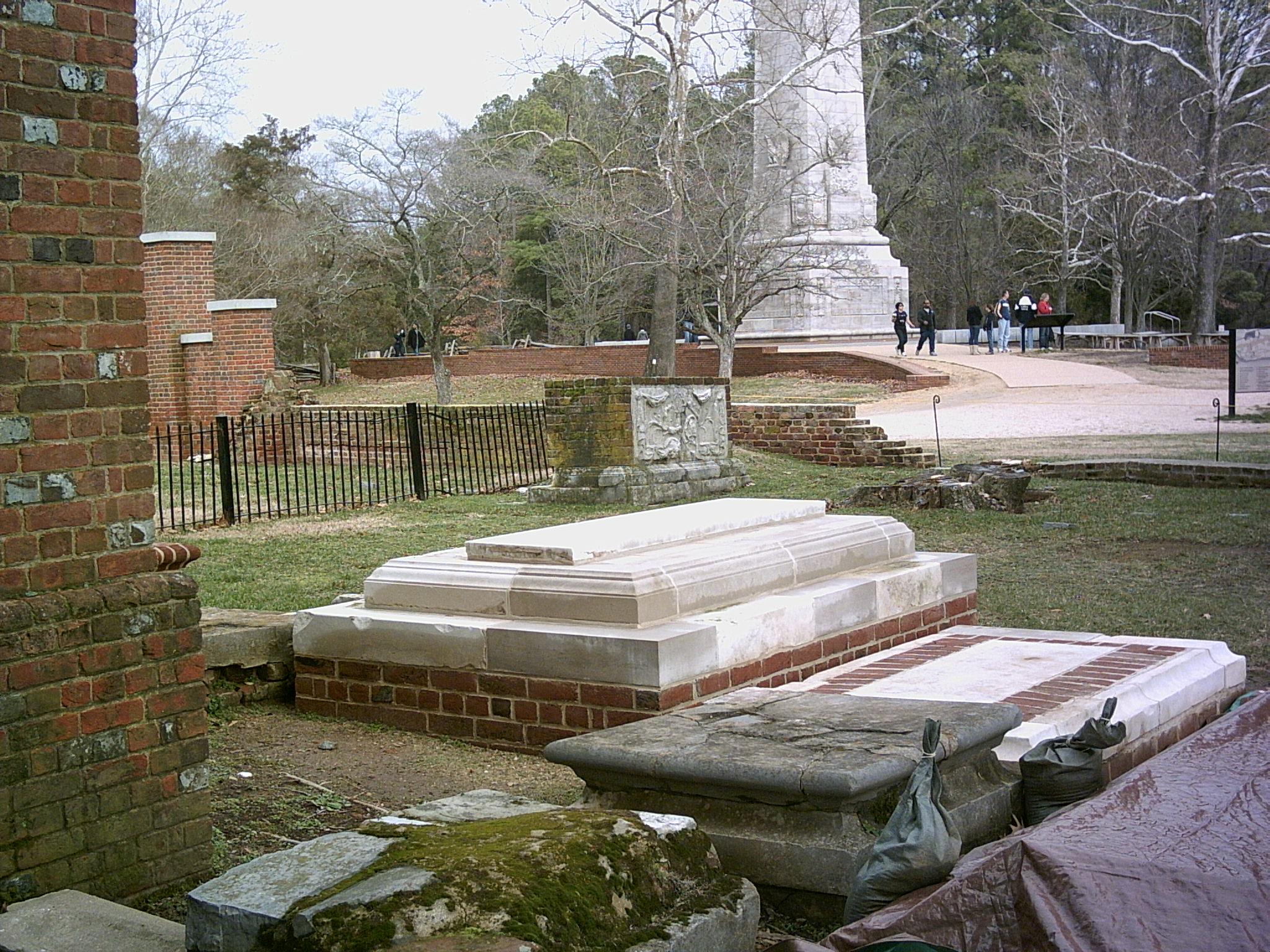
Tombs of James Blair (left) and his wife Sarah (right) at Jamestown

James Blair served as a member and for a time, president of the Governor's Council in Virginia. As representative of the Bishop of London (of Oxford until 1675), Henry Compton, Blair held great power and responsibility in Virginia. The separation of church and state became a fundamental political concept in Virginia only after the American Revolution. In response to complaints about dissolute clergy in the colonies, Compton had instructed Lieutenant Governor Herbert Jeffreys to investigate the situation, and then had suspended or removed those found problematic, as well as instituted a procedure to issue certificates attesting to a clergyman's orthodoxy and character and urged colonial governors not to hire those lacking such certificates. The other initial problem Blair faced was that in 1697, only half of organised parishes had ministers. Six years later, with Compton's assistance nearly 80% of the approximately 50 parishes had clergy, although then additional parishes were chartered. Other efforts proved less successful. For instance, he managed to increase clergy stipends to 16,000 pounds of tobacco annually, amounting to a value of about 60 pounds sterling rather than the 80 he desired. Also, to his dismay, the colony's lay leaders refused to introduce ecclesiastical courts for moral offenses. Nonetheless, Blair worked to improve the moral condition of the people while he also defended them against the tyranny of the royal governors. He had great influence in England, and reportedly was involved with the recall to England of one royal governor, Edmund Andros, and two Lieutenant Governors who were serving in the absence of the Royal Governor: Francis Nicholson and Alexander Spotswood.

He was also the Rector of Bruton Parish Church in Williamsburg from 1710 until his death. Blair organised the construction of the second church building, which began in 1711. The building was restored in the early 20th century under then-rector W.A.R. Goodwin. This project inspired Goodwin to advocate further restorations of other buildings, and seek sources of funding to do so, which led him to Colonial Williamsburg's greatest benefactor, Standard Oil fortune heir John D. Rockefeller Jr. and his family.

In 1722, Blair published Our Savior's Divine Sermon on the Mount, a five-volume collection of his sermons from 1707 to 1721. With Henry Hartwell and Edward Chilton, Blair wrote The Present State of Virginia and the College, which was published in 1727.

== Death, burial at Jamestown ==
Blair died of a gangrenous rupture on 18 April 1743. He was buried next to his wife Sarah (née Harrison) Blair (d.1713) at Jamestown Island. Preservation Virginia now owns the original Jamestown site, including the church and cemetery. In 2005, the Cypher Society of the college announced it was taking responsibility for a site restoration and beautification of the Blair graves at Jamestown Island in anticipation of Jamestown 2007, which celebrated the settlement's 400th anniversary.

== Heritage ==
probably no other man in the colonial time did so much for the intellectual life of Virginia.

— Moses Coit Tyler, professor of American history, Cornell University

During the Colonial period, Blair was instrumental in reviving and reforming the Church of England in Virginia.

Blair's contributions to education in Virginia are recognised not only at the College of William & Mary, where Blair Hall is named for him, but also in the naming of various schools, including James Blair Middle School in James City County, Virginia, (formerly James Blair High School) and James Blair Middle School in Norfolk, Virginia.

In the Wren Building of the College of William & Mary, a large portrait of Blair is displayed in the Great Hall. A statue of him on the campus was dedicated for the college's 300th birthday in 1993.

In 1943, the United States commissioned a victory ship James Blair in his honour.

== See also ==
- History of the Church of Scotland
- Scottish Episcopal Church
- Church of England
