= Talbot Hall =

Historic house in Virginia, United States

- U.S. National Register of Historic Places
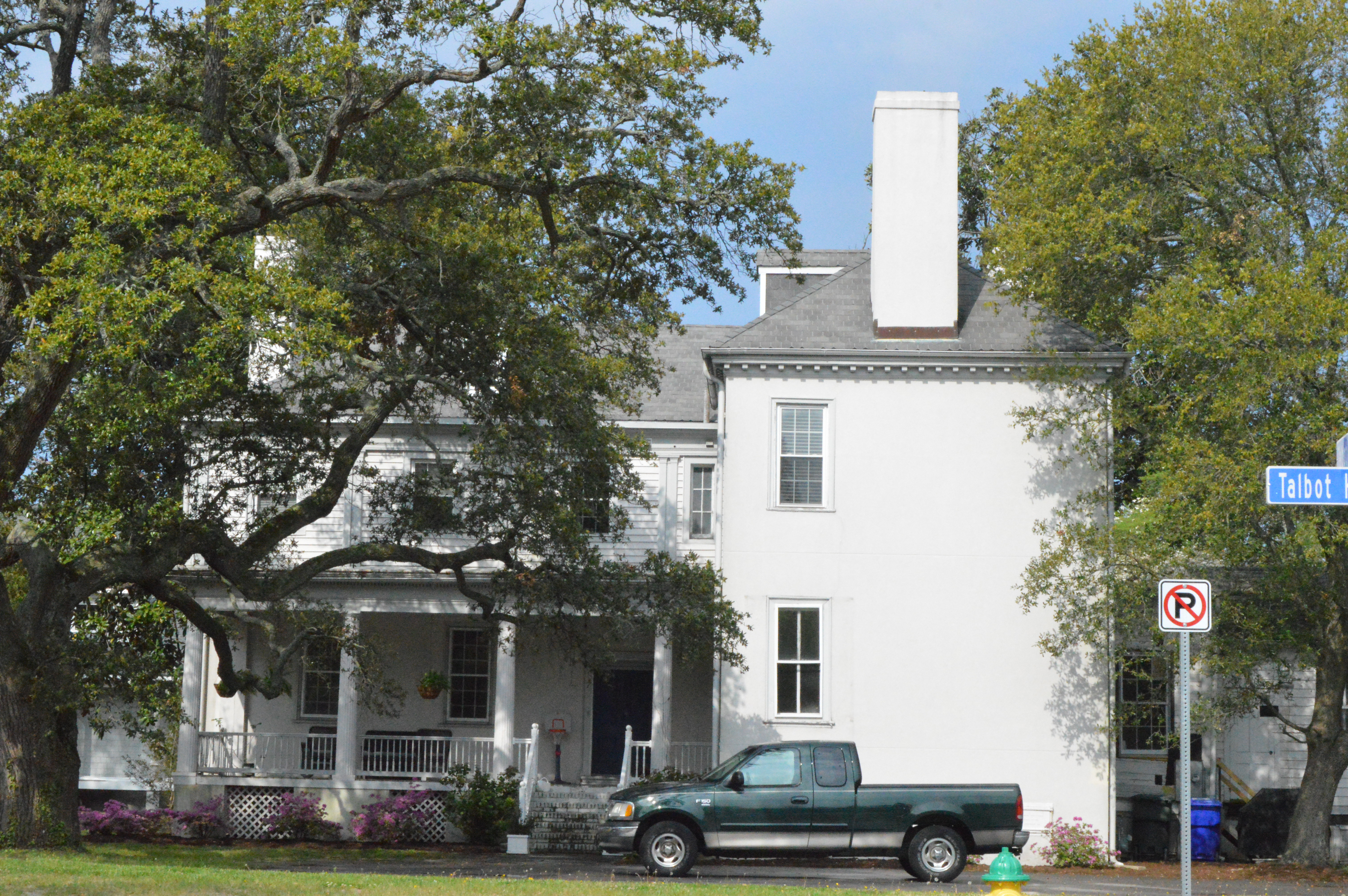
- Eastern side of the house

- Location within Virginia Location within the United States
- Location: 600 Talbot Hall Rd., 6601 Caroline St., 6651 Talbot Hall Ct., Norfolk, Virginia
- Coordinates: 36°54′12″N 76°17′14″W
- Area: Less than 1 acre (0.40 ha)
- Built: c. 1799
- Architectural style: Federal
- NRHP reference No.: 15001041
- Added to NRHP: February 2, 2016

Talbot Hall is a historic house at the western end of Talbot Hall Road in Norfolk, Virginia. It is a two-story masonry structure, built out of brick finished with stucco, and covered by a gable roof. It was built c. 1799-1802 by Samuel Butt Talbot as a summer retreat, and the property features views similar to those it would have had in the 19th century, including two 19th-century magnolia trees that grace the waterfront on the Lafayette River.

The house was listed on the National Register of Historic Places in 2016.

== See also ==
- National Register of Historic Places listings in Norfolk, Virginia
