= Colonial Place =

- U.S. National Register of Historic Places
- U.S. Historic district
- Virginia Landmarks Register
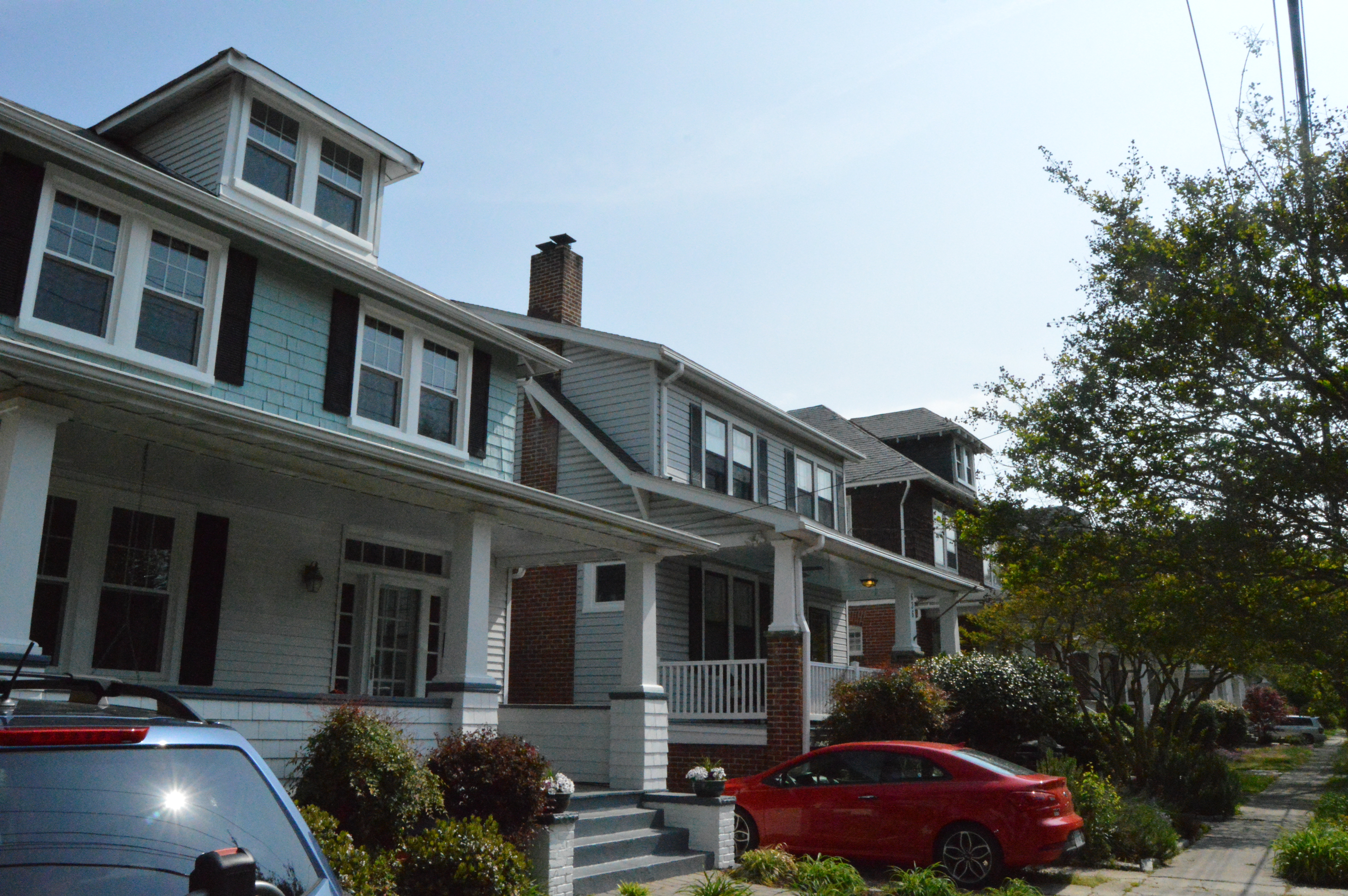
- Houses on Delaware Avenue

- Location within Virginia Location within the United States
- Location: Roughly bounded by the Lafayette River, Knitting Mill Creek, East Haven Creek, and 38th St. in Norfolk, Virginia
- Coordinates: 36°53′05″N 76°17′20″W
- Area: 202 acres (82 ha)
- Built: 1903
- Architect: George Dillard et al.
- Architectural style: Queen Anne, Colonial Revival, et al.
- NRHP reference No.: 02000532
- VLR No.: 122-0825

Significant dates
- Added to NRHP: May 22, 2002
- Designated VLR: June 13, 2001

Colonial Place is a residential neighborhood in Norfolk, Virginia. It is a peninsula bordered by 38th Street on the south, and surrounded on three sides by the Lafayette River. It is a relatively racially mixed area that includes mostly single family homes and a few apartment buildings. Many large homes front the water and Mayflower Road arches around the shore of the river.

The Colonial Place Historic District is a national historic district listed on the National Register of Historic Places in 2002. It encompasses 1,090 contributing buildings and 4 contributing sites in a primarily residential section of Norfolk. It is a middle-class and upper middle-class residential neighborhood that largely developed during the period 1903–1941. The neighborhood includes notable examples of the Queen Anne and Colonial Revival styles. Notable buildings include the Richard W. Peatross House (1908), Taylor House (1908) and Stuart Elementary School.
