= Zion Methodist Church (Norfolk, Virginia) =

Historic church in Virginia, United States

- U.S. National Register of Historic Places
- Virginia Landmarks Register
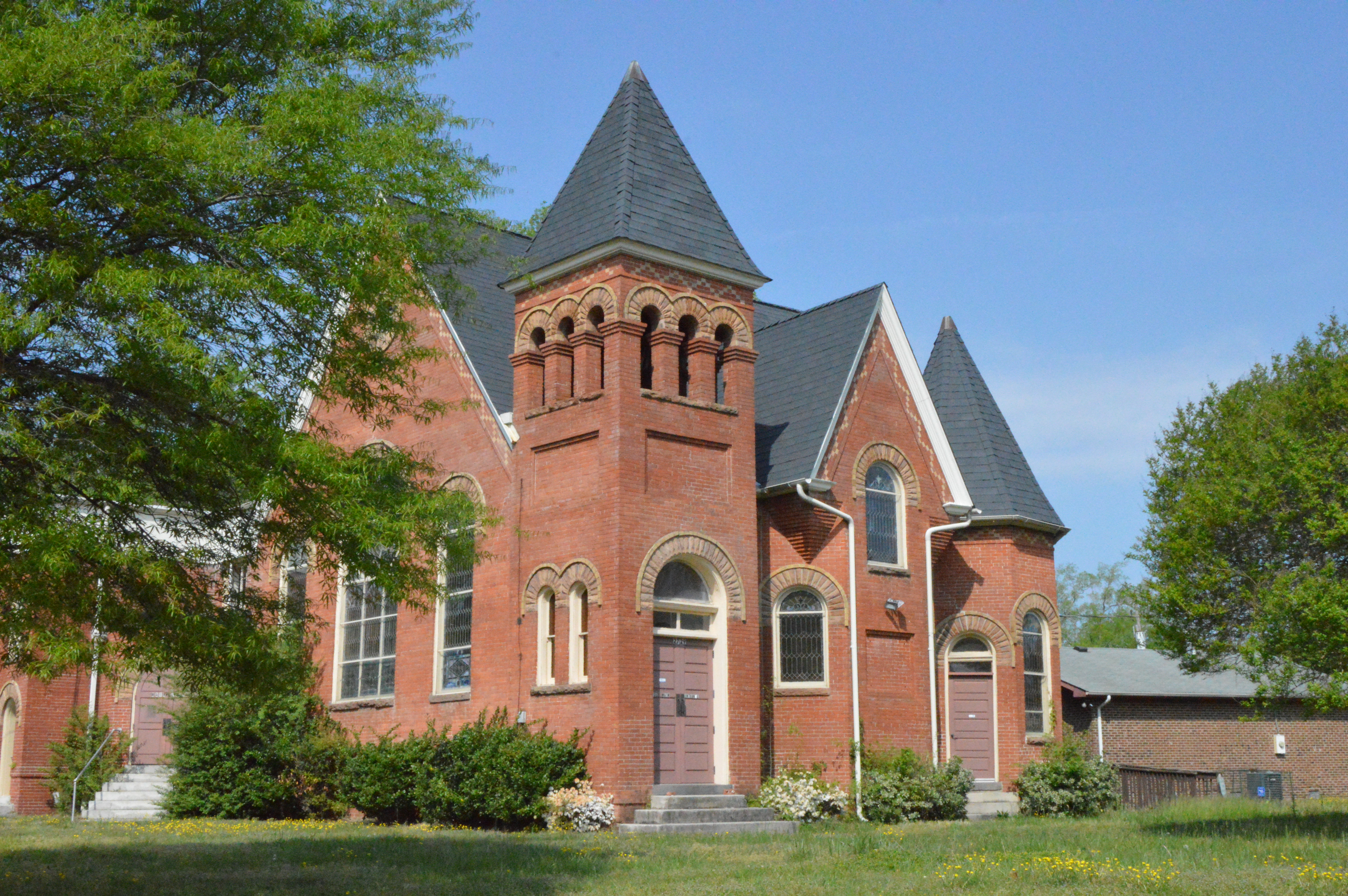
- Front and southern side

- Location within Virginia Location within the United States
- Location: 2729 Bowden's Ferry Rd., Norfolk, Virginia
- Coordinates: 36°52′41″N 76°18′15″W
- Area: 1 acre (0.40 ha)
- Built: 1896-1897, 1916
- Architect: Wickham Custis Taylor
- Architectural style: Romanesque
- NRHP reference No.: 07000274
- VLR No.: 122-0110

Significant dates
- Added to NRHP: April 4, 2007
- Designated VLR: December 6, 2006

Zion Methodist Church, now known as Norfolk United Methodist Church, is a historic Methodist church located at Norfolk, Virginia. It was built in 1896–1897, and is a modest one-story brick church topped by a side-gable roof in the Romanesque Revival style. The front façade is three-bays wide, and dominated by a projecting bay flanked by towers of differing heights. The annex was added in 1916 and is accessed by three overhead roll-up doors and consists of an open mezzanine with offices, offices and meeting spaces below, and serves for additional sanctuary space. Zion Methodist Church was founded in 1793, and is one of the first Methodist churches founded in Norfolk, Virginia.

It was listed on the National Register of Historic Places in 2007.
