= Saint Mary's Catholic Cemetery =

Historic cemetery in Virginia, United States

- U.S. National Register of Historic Places
- U.S. Historic district
- Virginia Landmarks Register
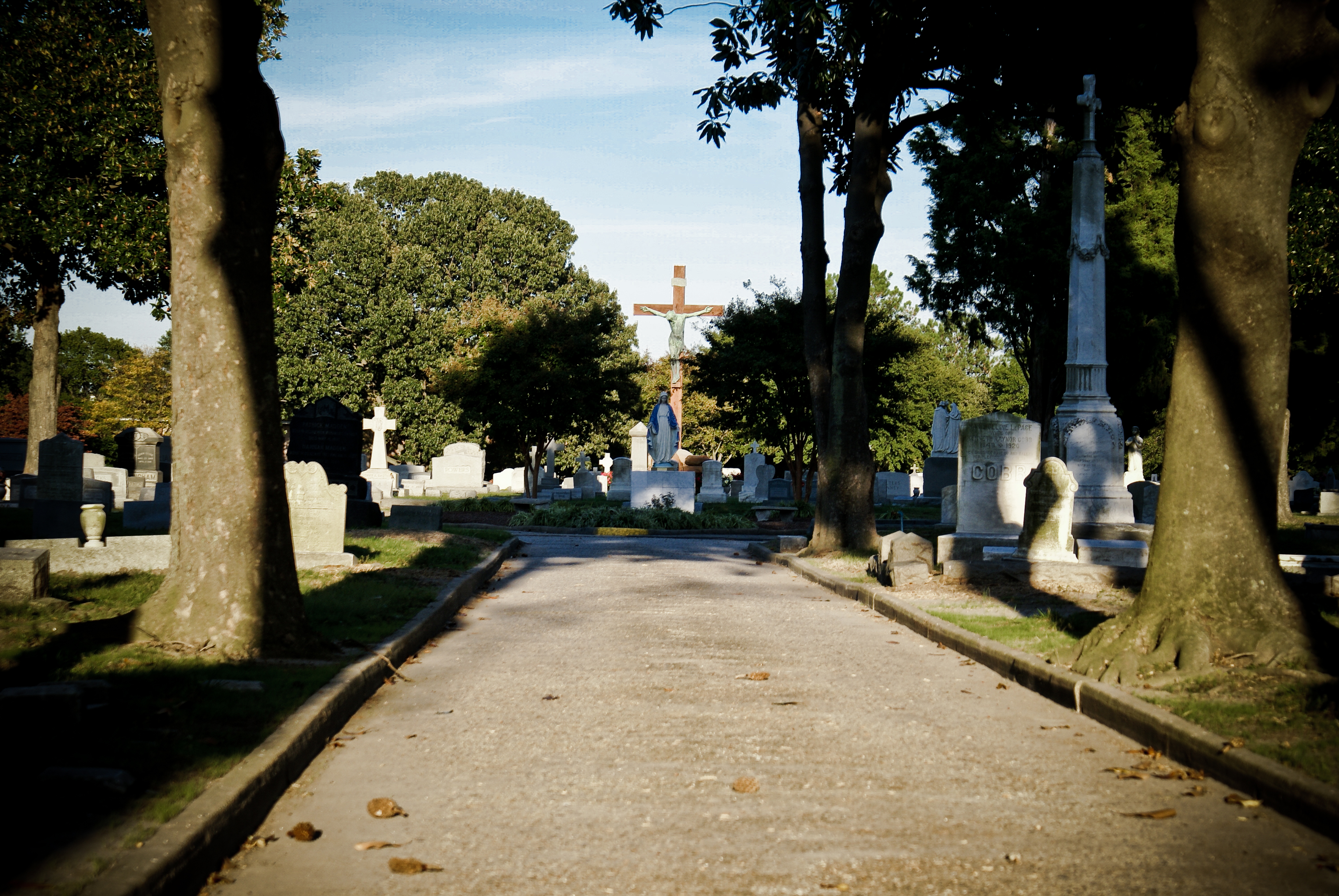
- View of the cemetery in 2008

- Location within Virginia Location within the United States
- Location: 3000 Church St., Norfolk, Virginia
- Coordinates: 36°52′28″N 76°16′49″W
- Area: 30 acres (12 ha)
- Architectural style: Mid 19th Century Revival
- NRHP reference No.: 01000694
- VLR No.: 122-1036

Significant dates
- Added to NRHP: July 13, 2001
- Designated VLR: July 13, 2001

Saint Mary's Catholic Cemetery is a historic cemetery and national historic district located in Norfolk, Virginia. It encompasses six contributing structures and one contributing object within a cemetery established in 1854 to serve the Roman Catholic communities of Norfolk, Virginia Beach, and Chesapeake. The cemetery was founded by the pastor of St. Mary's Church of Norfolk. Notable features include a large bronze crucifix, erected around 1922 in honor of Catholic servicemen who served in World War I, and six family mausoleums.

It was listed on the National Register of Historic Places in 2001.
