= Williamston–Woodland Historic District =

Historic district in Virginia, United States

- U.S. National Register of Historic Places
- U.S. Historic district
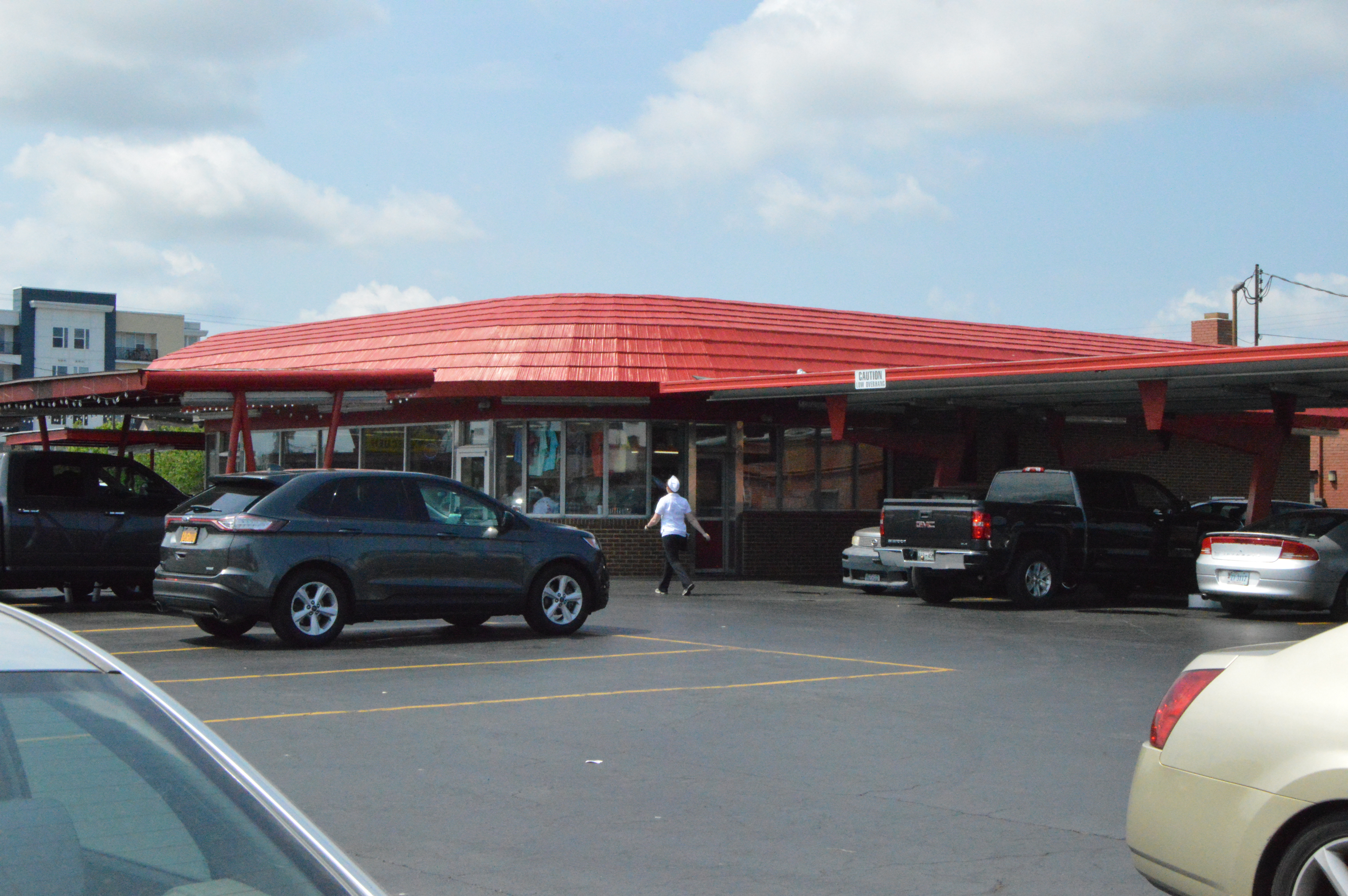
- Doumar's Barbecue, built 1949

- Location within Virginia Location within the United States
- Location: Roughly bounded by NSRR, Church, 18th & Omohundro Sts., Norfolk, Virginia
- Coordinates: 36°52′0″N 76°17′3″W
- Area: 38 acres (15 ha)
- Architectural style: Moderne, International, Art Deco
- NRHP reference No.: 14000530
- Added to NRHP: August 25, 2014

The Williamston–Woodland Historic District encompasses a light industrial area of Norfolk, Virginia. It is roughly bounded by Omohundro Avenue on the west, 18th Street on the south, Church Street on the east, and the Norfolk and Southern Railroad tracks to the north. The area was developed in the late 19th and early 20th centuries, and features a mix of architectural styles, from modest commercial styles to Moderne and Art Deco structures. Most of the buildings are either warehouses or light industrial plants, ranging in height from one to three stories. The land for much of this area was owned by Theodorick Williams prior to its development.

The district was listed on the National Register of Historic Places in 2014.

== See also ==
- National Register of Historic Places listings in Norfolk, Virginia
