= Seaboard Air Line Railway Building =

Historic commercial building in Virginia, United States

- U.S. National Register of Historic Places
- Virginia Landmarks Register
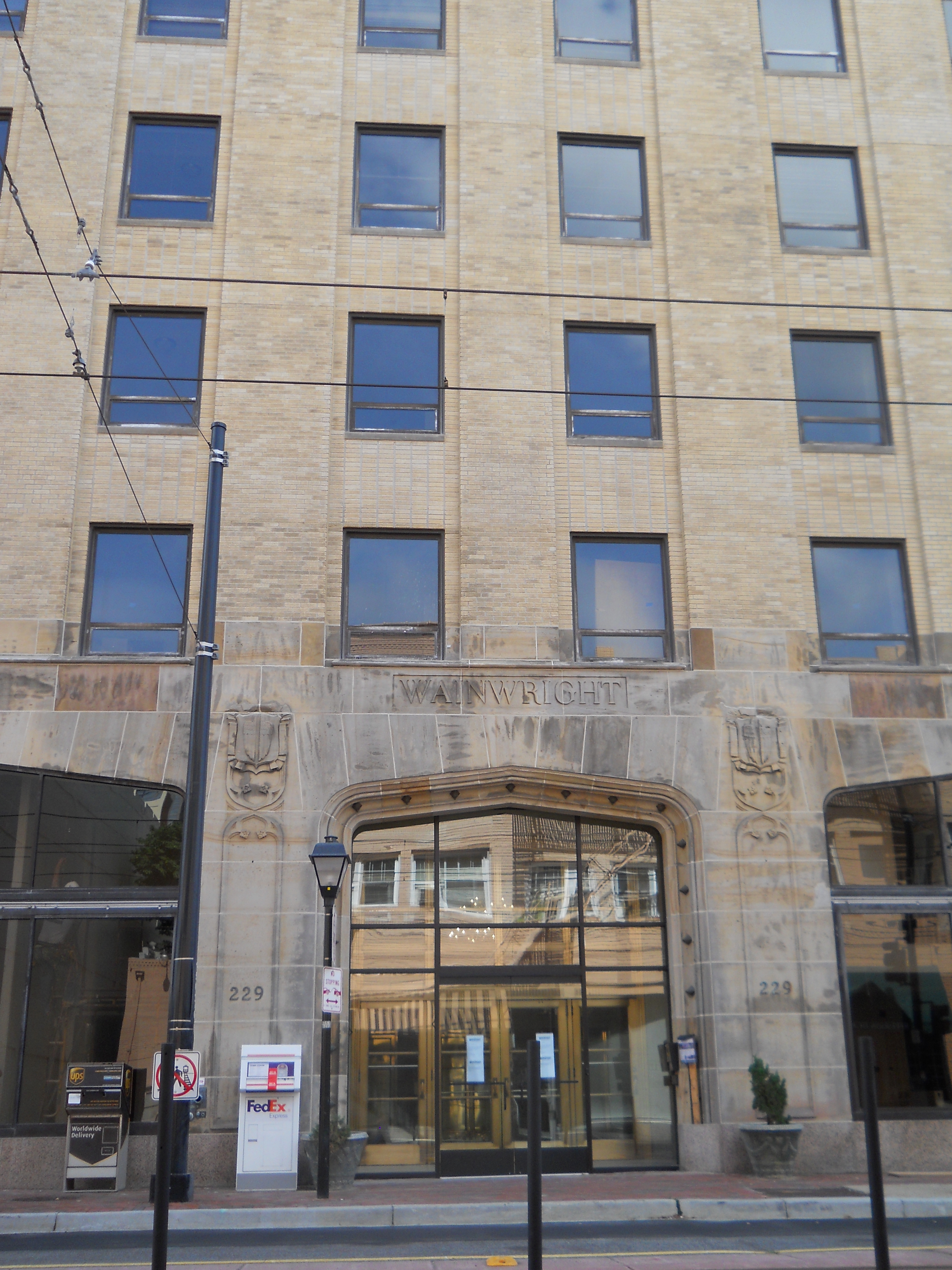
- Seaboard Air Line Railway Building, September 2013

- Location within Virginia Location within the United States
- Location: 221-229 W. Bute St., Norfolk, Virginia
- Coordinates: 36°51′10″N 76°17′30″W
- Area: .376 acres (0.152 ha)
- Built: 1925–1926
- Built by: Nichols & Lindemann
- Architect: Neff & Thompson
- Architectural style: Late Gothic Revival
- NRHP reference No.: 12001271
- VLR No.: 122-0060-0210

Significant dates
- Added to NRHP: February 5, 2013
- Designated VLR: December 13, 2012

Seaboard Air Line Railway Building, also known as the Wainwright Building, is a historic office building located in Norfolk, Virginia. It was built in 1925–1926 as headquarters for Seaboard Air Line Railroad. It is a nine-story, 92,000 square-foot, steel reinforced concrete building. It is V-shaped and faced in textured yellow brick with numerous stone decorative elements in the Late Gothic Revival style.

It was listed on the National Register of Historic Places in 2013. The building was converted to luxury apartments in 2013 and is now known as The Wainwright Downtown.
