= West Freemason Street Area Historic District =

Historic district in Virginia, United States

- U.S. National Register of Historic Places
- U.S. Historic district
- Virginia Landmarks Register
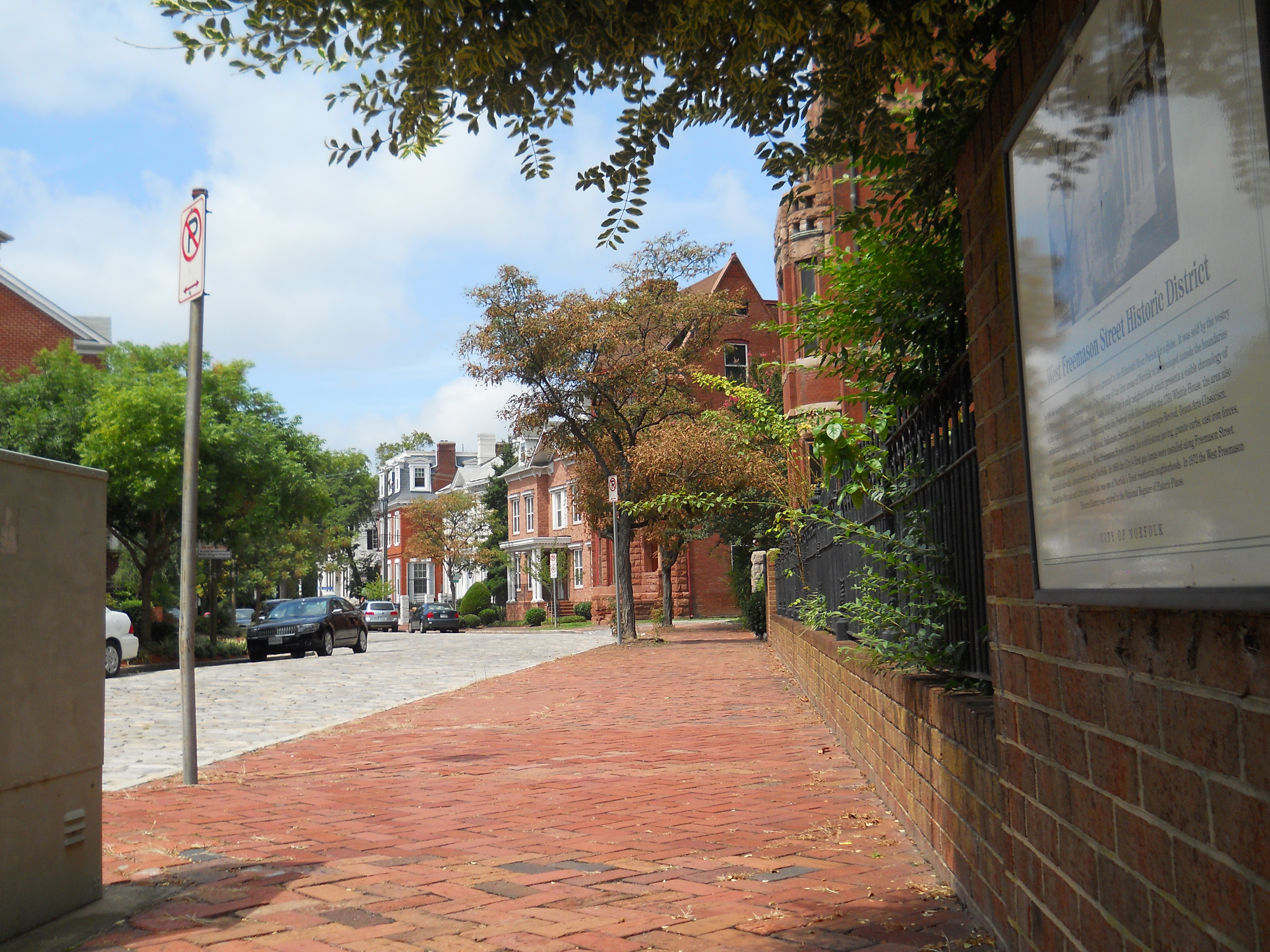
- W. Freemason St. Historic District, September 2013

- Location within Virginia Location within the United States
- Location: Both sides of Bute and Freemason Sts. between Elizabeth River, and York and Duke Sts., Norfolk, Virginia
- Coordinates: 36°51′08″N 76°17′40″W
- Area: 40 acres (16 ha)
- Architectural style: Late Victorian, Greek Revival, Federal
- NRHP reference No.: 72001512
- VLR No.: 122-0060

Significant dates
- Added to NRHP: November 7, 1972
- Designated VLR: December 21, 1971

The West Freemason Street Area Historic District is a national historic district located at Norfolk, Virginia. It encompasses 48 contributing buildings in a primarily residential section on the western edge of the center city of Norfolk. It developed between the late-18th and early-20th centuries and includes notable examples of the Federal, Greek Revival, and Late Victorian styles. Notable buildings include Kenmure House Glisson House, Whittle House, McCullough Row, and the Camp-Hubard house. Located in the district is the separately listed Allmand-Archer House.

It was listed on the National Register of Historic Places in 1972.
