= Basilica of Saint Mary of the Immaculate Conception (Norfolk, Virginia) =

Historic church in Virginia, United States

- St. Mary's Church
- U.S. National Register of Historic Places
- Virginia Landmarks Register
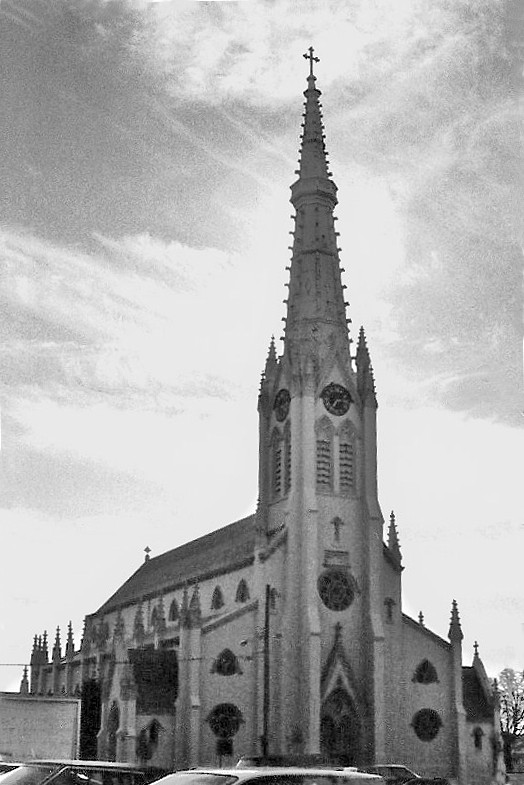
- St Mary's Church facade on Chapel Street, in downtown Norfolk

- Location within Virginia Location within the United States
- Location: 232 Chapel St., Norfolk, Virginia
- Coordinates: 36°50′49″N 76°16′56″W
- Area: 2 acres (0.81 ha)
- Built: 1857-1858, 1894
- Architectural style: Late Gothic Revival, Gothic Revival
- NRHP reference No.: 79003287
- VLR No.: 122-0024

Significant dates
- Added to NRHP: May 25, 1979
- Designated VLR: February 21, 1978

The Minor Basilica of Saint Mary of the Immaculate Conception (also known as the Black Basilica) is a Black Catholic parish in downtown Norfolk, Virginia. It is the oldest parish in the Diocese of Richmond and is known locally as "The Mother Church of Tidewater Virginia".

The church was built in 1857–1858, and is a rectangular stuccoed brick church. It features a centrally located, three-stage tower with spire. Also on the property is the contributing rectory. It is a three-story, rectangular brick building in the Late Gothic Revival style.

It was listed on the National Register of Historic Places in 1979 and named a minor basilica in 1991. The associated Saint Mary's Catholic Cemetery was added to the Register in 2001.

== History ==
=== Beginnings ===
The parish began in 1791 as Saint Patrick Church founded by French Catholics fleeing the French Revolution who were joined by some of the earliest Irish Catholic immigrants to the United States. St. Patrick's was the oldest parish in the Richmond Diocese and predated the formation of the diocese by 29 years.

=== First building ===
The first church edifice was built in 1842.

Since it was in the Southern United States, the racially segregated Christian church was for Whites only. Fr. Matthew O’Keefe initiated permitting African American Catholics to sit in an assigned portion of the choir loft for their use only. The anti-Catholic Know Nothings threatened him unless the church instituted segregated Masses, which he refused. Thugs tried to intimidate White parishioners until Fr. O’Keefe obtained police protection.

The church was destroyed by fire in 1856. Diocesan records show that local Catholic families believed the Know Nothings were responsible. "The Assumption," a painting donated by King Louis Philippe and Queen Amelie, was lost in the blaze.

=== Rebuilding ===
The present building was completed in 1858 and was rededicated under the title of the Blessed Virgin Mary of the Immaculate Conception in commemoration of the Marian dogma proclaimed in 1854 by Pope Pius IX.

The parish supported St. Mary Academy, an inner-city school that provided a Christian education to hundreds of urban children, most of whom were non-Catholic; however, circumstances eventually forced the academy to close. The parish also operates a soup kitchen and provides other outreach to Norfolk's poor and homeless.

=== Merger and renovation ===
In 1961, seventy-two years after its founding, Saint Joseph's—a nearby Black Catholic parish staffed by the Josephites—was clustered with Saint Mary's. The newly combined parish would later boast 99% African American membership.

After being added to the National Register of Historic Places in 1979 and undergoing an extensive renovation and restoration program, the edifice was rededicated on November 1, 1989.

=== Minor basilica ===
On the occasion of the 200th anniversary of the church, December 8, 1991, Pope John Paul II proclaimed the Church of Saint Mary of the Immaculate Conception a minor basilica, the only one in the Commonwealth of Virginia and one of only a few with African-American predominance. In his announcement, the pope stated:

"Your Black cultural heritage enriches the Church and makes her witness of universality more complete. In a real way the Church needs you, just as you need the Church, for you are a part of the Church and the church is part of you."

Despite the renovations in 1979, a litany of structural issues developed, with a 2015 inspection revealing massive rot and termite damage in the walls and roof. This kickstarted a second restoration project, to the tune of some $6.7M, which was completed in December 2020.

During the project, workers discovered a series of crypts and tunnels under the church floor, the latter of which are speculated to have been involved with the Underground Railroad. The restoration also included work on the church's historic organ, which had been unusable since 1981.

== Influence ==
When Fr. Matthew O'Keefe moved north to Maryland, he modeled his new church after St. Mary's. Completed in 1906, Church of the Immaculate Conception in Towson shares the blueprints of St. Mary's with the exceptions of a larger rose window rather than a spire, thicker interior columns, and brownstone accents to the buttress and windows. Father O'Keefe, the first pastor of the new St. Mary's (Norfolk) and Immaculate Conception (Towson), is buried beneath the altar of the latter.

== Gallery ==
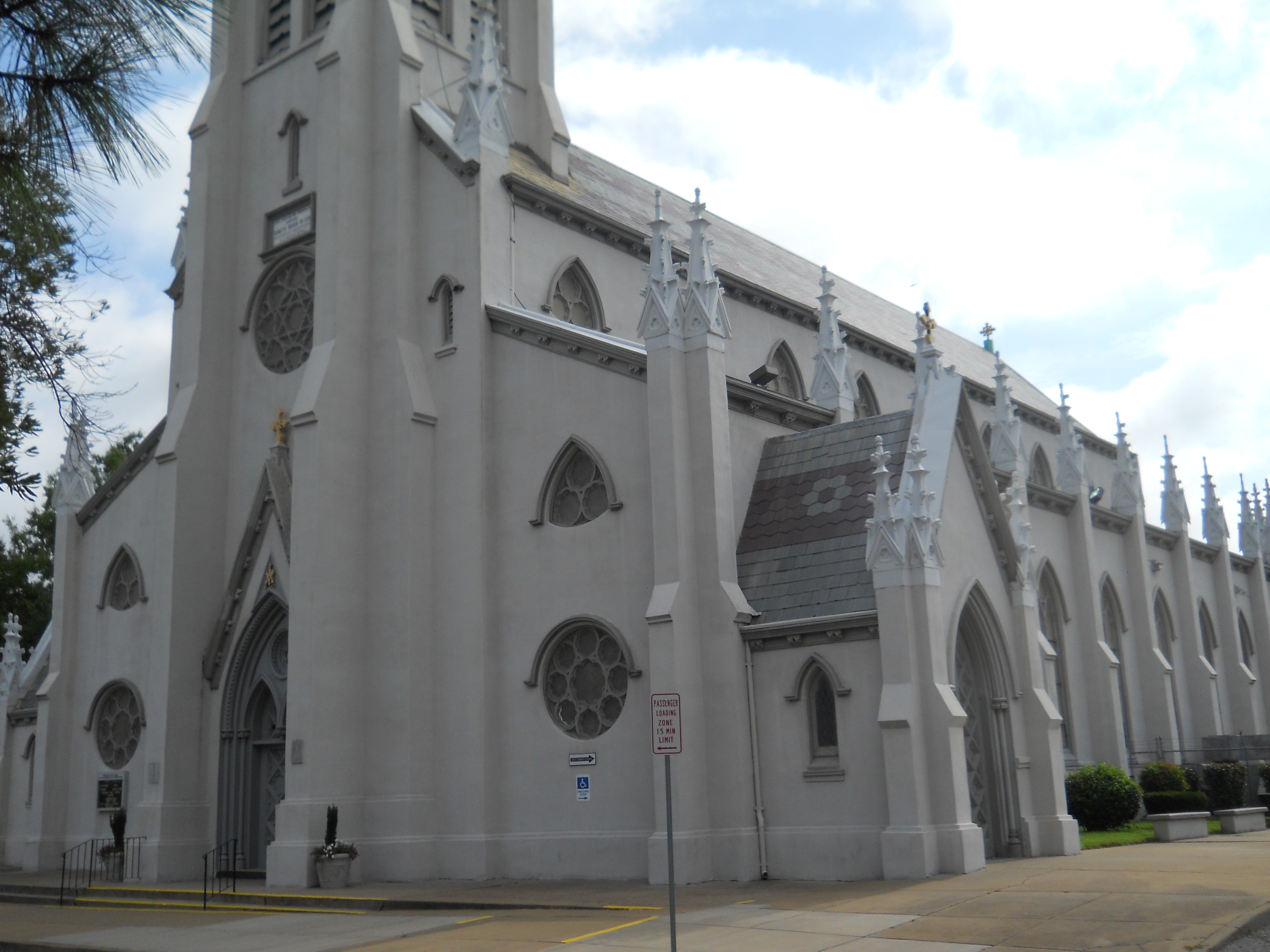
St. Mary's Church, September 2013

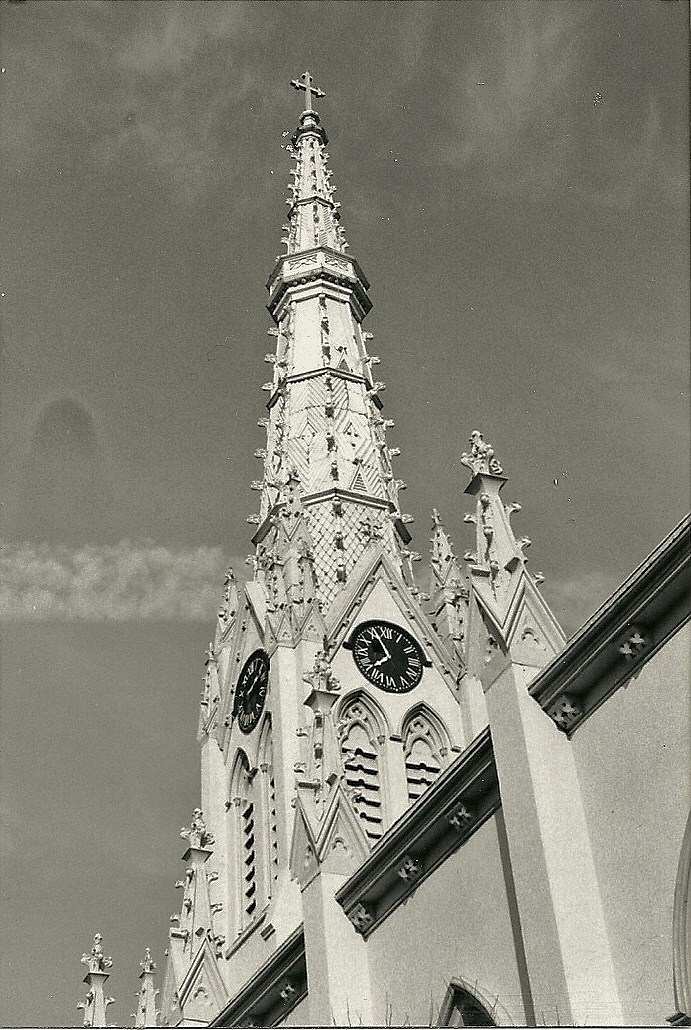
Spire from Virgin Street

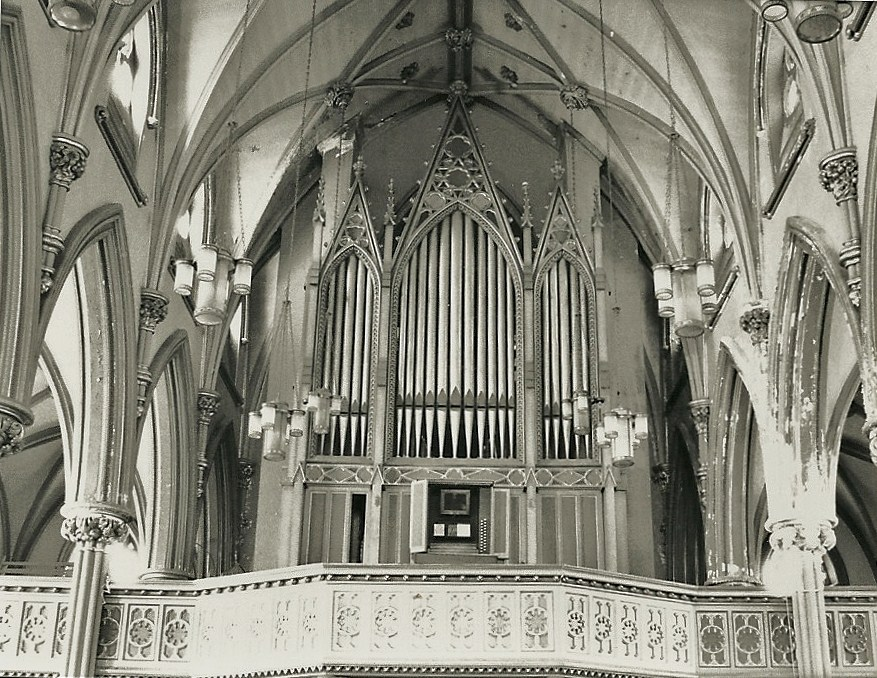
Ferris and Stuart Organ (1858)

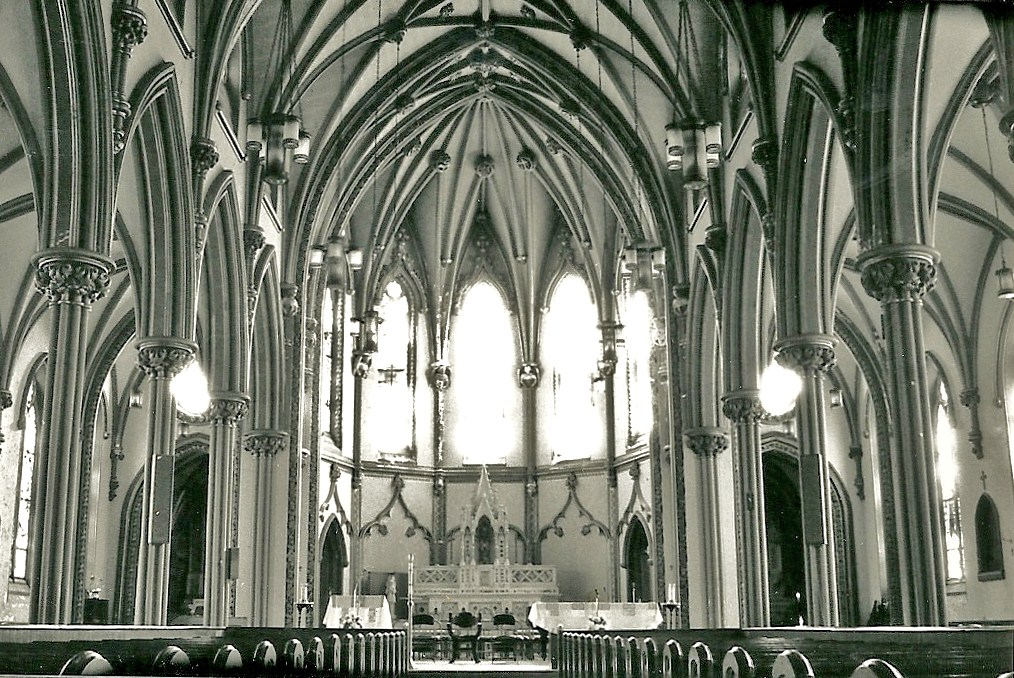
Gothic Revival style vaults, chancel, and altar
