= Poplar Hall (Norfolk, Virginia) =

Historic house in Virginia, United States

- U.S. National Register of Historic Places
- Virginia Landmarks Register
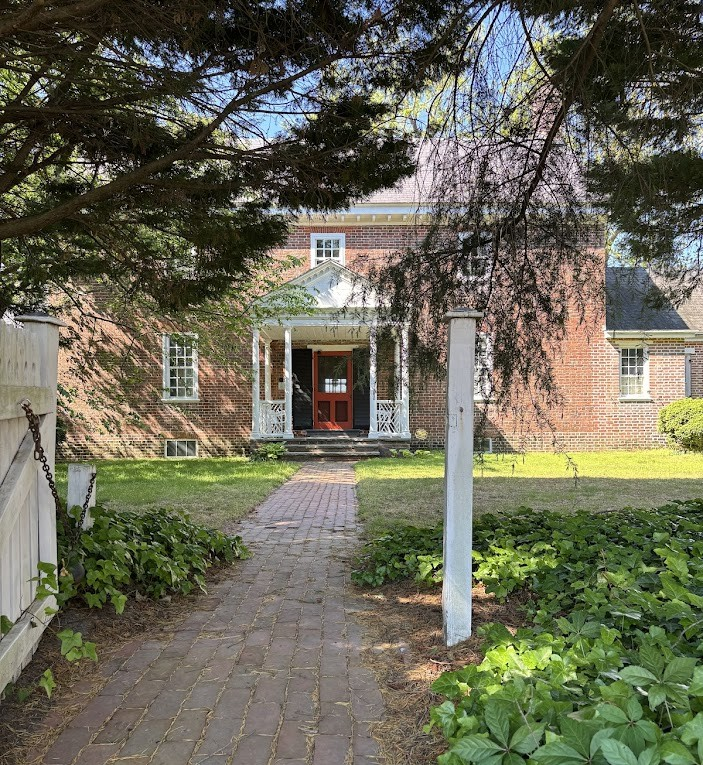
- Front of Poplar Hall in 2026, seen from street

- Location within Virginia Location within the United States
- Location: 400 Stuart Cir., Norfolk, Virginia
- Coordinates: 36°50′44″N 76°12′41″W
- Area: 1.3 acres (0.53 ha)
- Built: c. 1760
- Architectural style: Georgian
- NRHP reference No.: 97001402
- VLR No.: 122-0045

Significant dates
- Added to NRHP: November 7, 1997
- Designated VLR: March 19, 1997

Poplar Hall is a historic plantation house located at Norfolk, Virginia. It was built about 1760, and is a two-story, five-bay, Georgian style brick dwelling. It is covered with a slate gable roof and has interior end chimneys. It features a central one-bay dwarf portico and a low, hipped roof topped by a three-bay cupola. Both entrances are sheltered by a dwarf portico. A one-story brick wing was added about 1860, a frame addition in 1955, and a one-story frame wing in 1985. Also on the property is a contributing dairy. The house was built for Thurmer Hoggard, a planter and ship's carpenter who developed a private shipyard on the site.

It was listed on the National Register of Historic Places in 1997.
