= Virginia Ice & Freezing Corporation Cold Storage Warehouse =

- U.S. National Register of Historic Places
- Virginia Landmarks Register
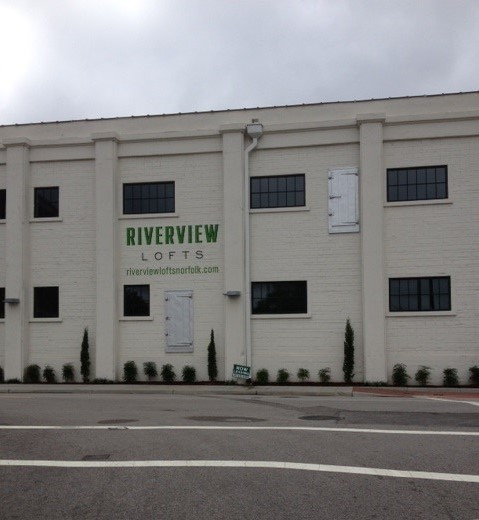

- Location within Virginia Location within the United States
- Location: 835 Southampton Ave., Norfolk, Virginia
- Coordinates: 36°51′23″N 76°18′24″W
- Area: less than one acre
- Built: 1920
- Architect: Mitchell, Benjamin Franklin
- Architectural style: Early Commercial
- NRHP reference No.: 09000922
- VLR No.: 122-5423

Significant dates
- Added to NRHP: November 13, 2009
- Designated VLR: September 17, 2009

Virginia Ice & Freezing Corporation Cold Storage Warehouse is a historic cold-storage warehouse building in Norfolk, Virginia, United States. It was built in 1920, and is a three-story concrete block building on a concrete foundation, built in three sections. The sections are a two-story, eight-bay warehouse; a three-story, L-shaped addition; and a two-story concrete block addition. The Virginia Ice & Freezing Corp. had one of the largest ice and cold storage operations in Norfolk and was next to several of the leading oyster and fish processing plants.

It was listed on the National Register of Historic Places in 2009.
