= Lambert's Point Knitting Mill =

- Lambert's Point Knitting Mill (122-0934)
- U.S. National Register of Historic Places
- Virginia Landmarks Register
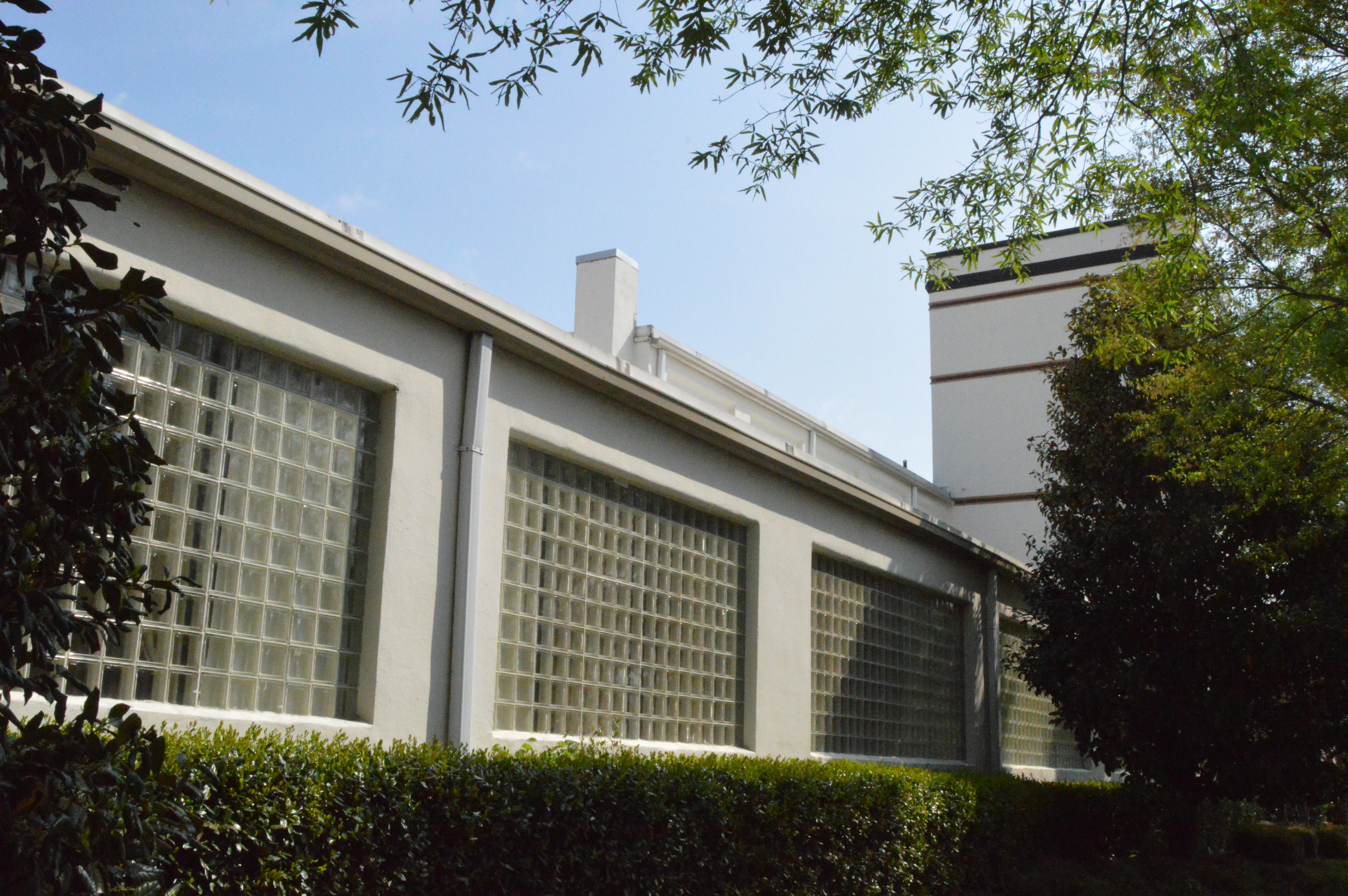
- Front of the mill

- Location within Virginia Location within the United States
- Location: 808 W. 44th St., Norfolk, Virginia
- Coordinates: 36°53′11″N 76°17′45″W
- Area: 1.2 acres (0.49 ha)
- Built: 1895
- NRHP reference No.: 05001585
- VLR No.: 122-0934

Significant dates
- Added to NRHP: February 1, 2006
- Designated VLR: December 7, 2005

Lambert's Point Knitting Mill, also known as The Knitting Mill and Old Dominion Paper Company, is a historic mill building located at Norfolk, Virginia. It was built in 1895, and consists of the central two-story original mill building highlighted by a tall four-story tower. It was augmented in the 1950s by a one-story addition on the south elevation, and by additional one-story additions on the north and west sides of the building. The masonry structure is clad with smooth-finished concrete stucco.

It was listed on the National Register of Historic Places in 2006.
