= Allmand–Archer House =

Historic house in Virginia, United States

- U.S. National Register of Historic Places
- U.S. Historic district – Contributing property
- Virginia Landmarks Register
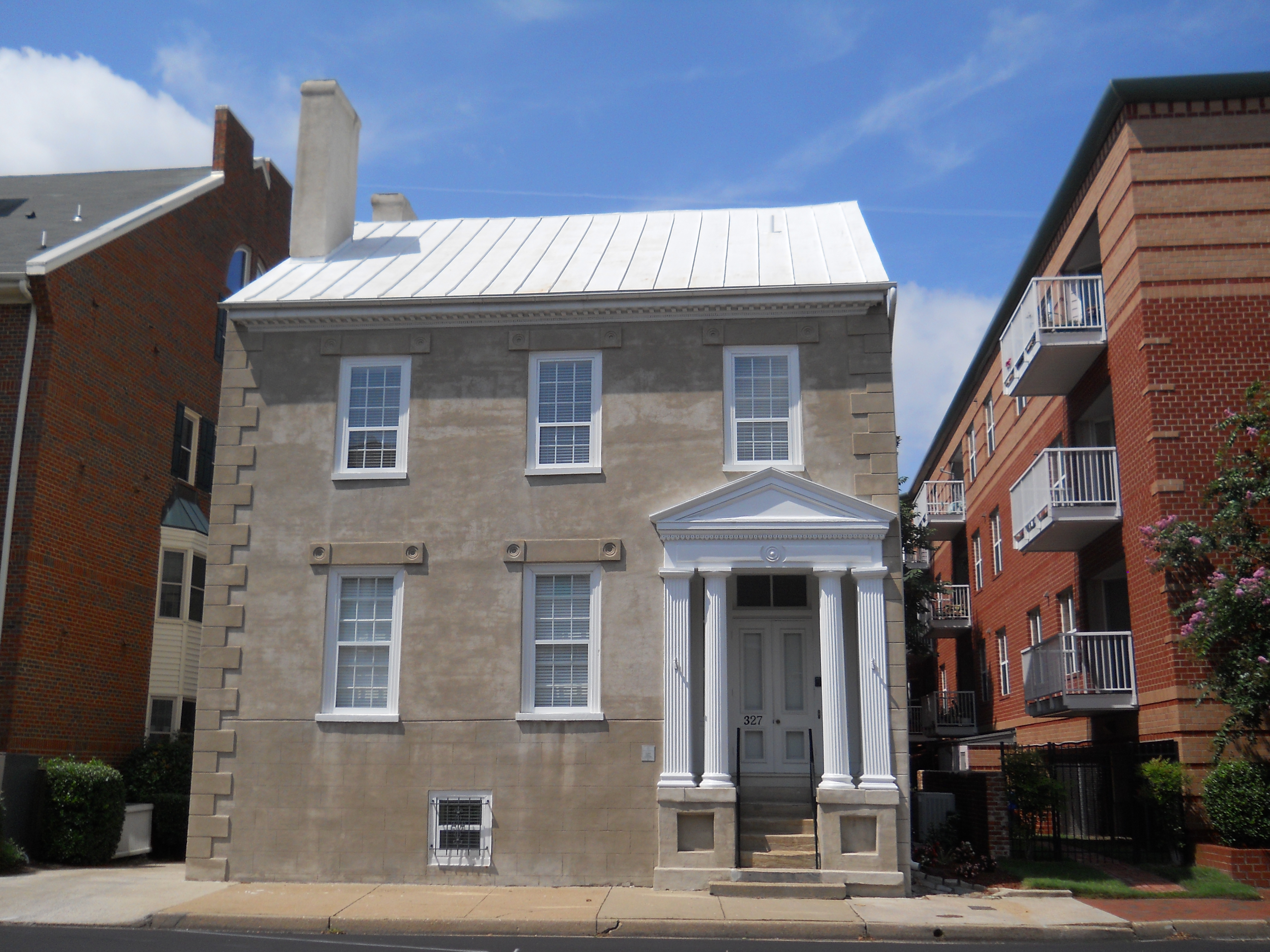
- Allmand–Archer House, September 2013

- Location within Virginia Location within the United States
- Location: 327 Duke St., Norfolk, Virginia
- Coordinates: 36°51′4″N 76°17′35″W
- Area: 9.9 acres (4.0 ha)
- Built: 1795
- Architectural style: Classical Revival
- NRHP reference No.: 71001056
- VLR No.: 122-0001

Significant dates
- Added to NRHP: September 22, 1971
- Designated VLR: November 3, 1970

The Allmand–Archer House is a historic house located at 327 Duke Street in the West Freemason Street Area Historic District of Norfolk, Virginia.

== Description and history ==
It was built about 1795, and is a two-story, three-bay brick townhouse, approximately 30 feet square. The front facade is stuccoed with stucco quoins in a Classical Revival style. The house has a recessed front entrance framed by a pedimented entablature supported on fluted Roman Doric order columns and pilasters. During the War of 1812, it housed American officers stationed in Norfolk.

It was listed on the National Register of Historic Places on September 22, 1971.
