= Taylor–Whittle House =

Historic house in Virginia, United States

- U.S. National Register of Historic Places
- Virginia Landmarks Register
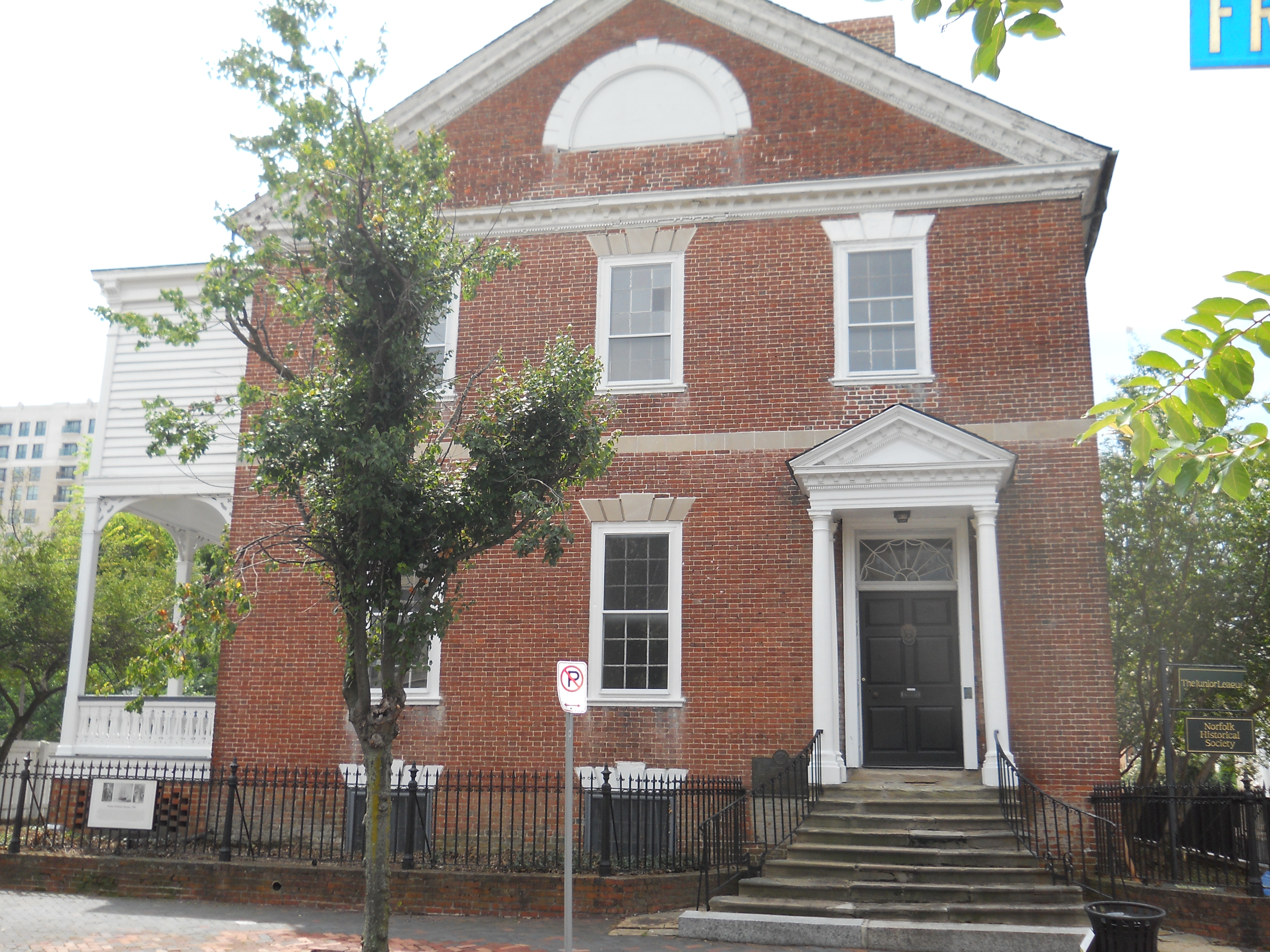
- Taylor–Whittle House, September 2013

- Location within Virginia Location within the United States
- Location: 225 W. Freemason St., Norfolk, Virginia
- Coordinates: 36°51′5″N 76°17′33″W
- Area: 9.9 acres (4.0 ha)
- Built: c. 1791
- Architectural style: Federal
- NRHP reference No.: 71001059
- VLR No.: 122-0021

Significant dates
- Added to NRHP: September 22, 1971
- Designated VLR: November 3, 1970

Taylor–Whittle House is a historic home located at Norfolk, Virginia. It was built about 1791, and is a two-story, three-bay, 40 feet square, Federal style brick townhouse. The house has a pedimented gable roof, and a small pedimented roof supported on Doric order columns over the porch. It has a brick and frame rear kitchen ell. There is a two-level Italianate-style porch added to the garden side. The Norfolk Historic Foundation took possession of the house in 1972, and house has served as the offices of the Norfolk Historical Society and the Junior League of Norfolk-Virginia Beach until 2011.

It was listed on the National Register of Historic Places in 1971.
