= Lafayette Grammar and High School =

Historic buildings in Virginia, US

- U.S. National Register of Historic Places
- Virginia Landmarks Register
- Location within Virginia Location within the United States
- Location: 3109 Tidewater Dr., Norfolk, Virginia
- Coordinates: 36°52′37″N 76°15′52″W
- Area: 1.2 acres (0.49 ha)
- Built: 1905, 1910
- Architect: Hebard, Vance; Lee & Deihl
- Architectural style: Colonial Revival
- NRHP reference No.: 83003298
- VLR No.: 122-0043

Significant dates
- Added to NRHP: February 10, 1983
- Designated VLR: December 14, 1982

Lafayette Grammar and High School, also known as Lafayette I.O.P. Center, is a historic school complex located at Norfolk, Virginia. The grammar school was built in 1905, and is a two-story brick building in the Colonial Revival style. It has a slate covered hipped roof and arched window openings. The high school was built in 1910, and is a two-story brick building connected to the grammar school. The school was abandoned in 1970.

It was listed on the National Register of Historic Places in 1983.
