= Park Place Historic District (Norfolk, Virginia) =

- U.S. National Register of Historic Places
- U.S. Historic district
- Virginia Landmarks Register
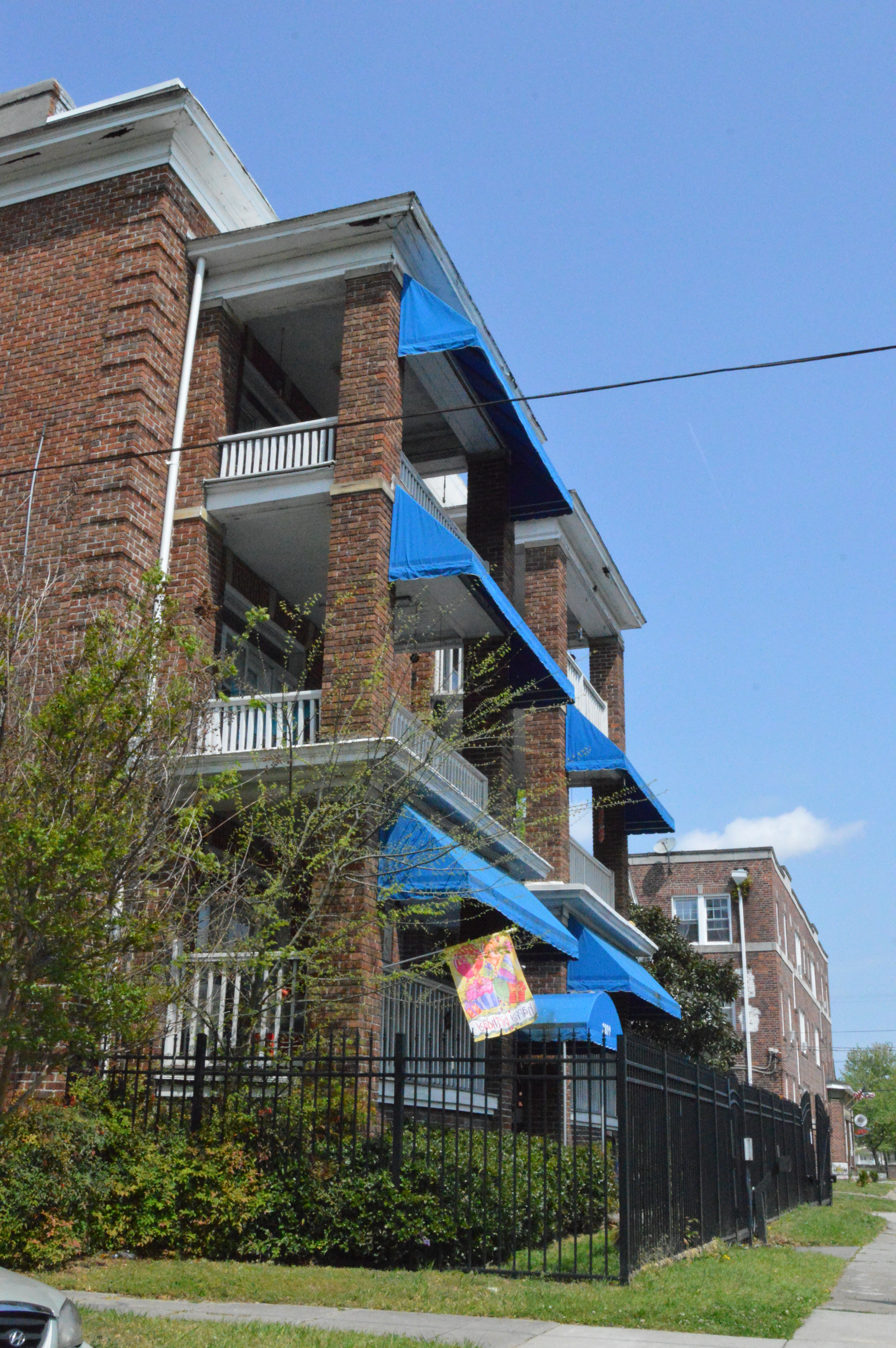
- Colonial Avenue north of 28th Street

- Location within Virginia Location within the United States
- Location: Roughly bounded by Colley Avenue., 24th St., Granby St. and 38th St., Norfolk, Virginia
- Coordinates: 36°52′34″N 76°17′25″W
- Area: 347 acres (140 ha)
- Built: 1884
- Architect: A.O. Ferebee, Vance Hebard, et al.
- Architectural style: Queen Anne, Shingle Style, et al.
- NRHP reference No.: 06000029 (original); 100001047 (increase)
- VLR No.: 122-5087

Significant dates
- Added to NRHP: February 10, 2006
- Boundary increase: June 5, 2017
- Designated VLR: December 7, 2005

Park Place is a neighborhood in the western half of Norfolk, Virginia. Its boundaries are roughly Granby Street on the east, Colley Avenue on the west, 23rd Street on the south and up to (and including the southern half of) 38th Street to the north. Within these boundaries Park Place is made up of 4 historic subdivisions; Virginia Place, East Kensington, Park Place, and East Old Dominion Place.

The Park Place Historic District is a national historic district listed on the National Register of Historic Places in 2005 and enlarged in 2017. It encompasses 1,525 contributing buildings, 2 contributing sites, and 5 contributing structures in the Park Place neighborhood of Norfolk. It is an example of streetcar suburban development in Norfolk during the late 19th and early 20th centuries. The neighborhood includes a variety of commercial, residential, industrial, and institutional buildings in a variety of popular styles including the Queen Anne and Shingle Style. Notable buildings include Batchelder and Collins (1904), J. W. Gamage and Son (1910), National Linen Service (1941), Best Repair Company (1938), Rosna Theater (1942), Newport Plaza and Theater (1930), Park Place Baptist Church (1903), Church of the Ascension (1915), Christian Temple (1922), Park Place Methodist Church (1949), Knox Presbyterian Church (1940), the Touraine (1915), Colonial Hall Apartments (1925), and Camellia Court (1914).
