= Lafayette River =

River in the United States of America

Lafayette River Tanner's Creek
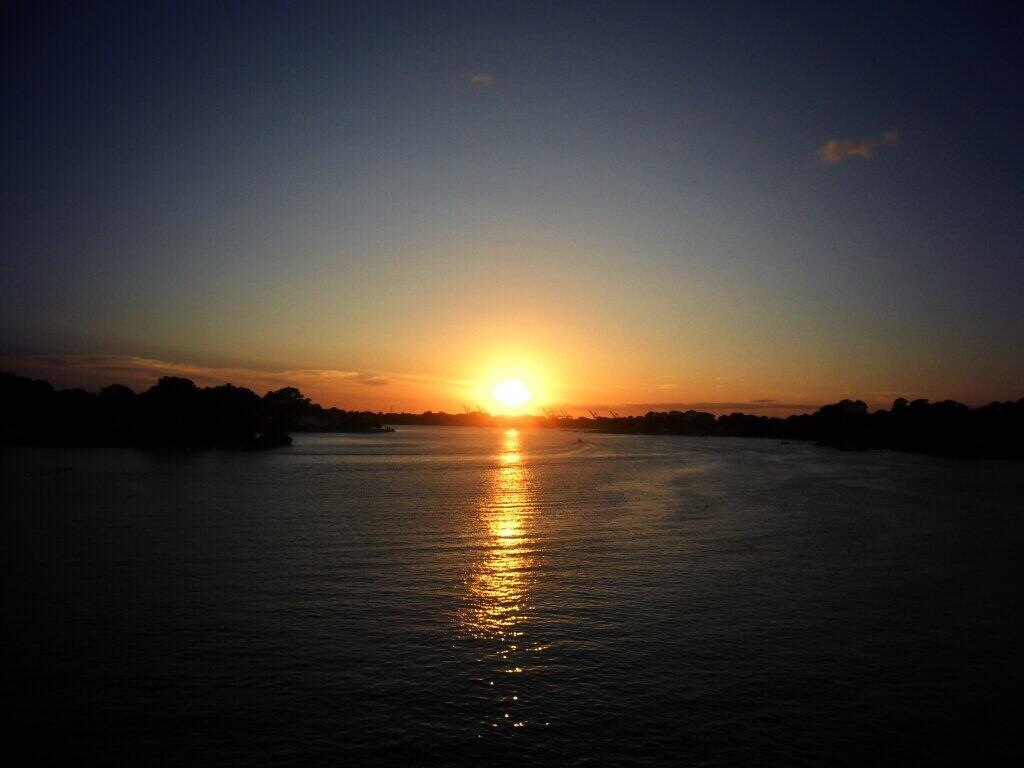

Location
- Country: United States
- State: Virginia
- City: Norfolk

Physical characteristics
- Mouth: Elizabeth River
  - coordinates: 36.8960°N 76.3232°W
- Length: 6.2 mi (10.0 km)

The Lafayette River, earlier known as Tanner's Creek, is a 6.2-mile-long (10.0 km) tidal estuary which empties into the Elizabeth River just south of Sewell's Point near its mouth at Hampton Roads, which in turn empties into the southern end of the Chesapeake Bay in southeast Virginia in the United States. It is entirely located in the city of Norfolk, Virginia.

== History ==
The small river was initially known as Tanner's Creek. At the time of the arrival of the English colonists in 1607, the area around the creek was inhabited by the Chesepians, a group of eastern-Algonquian speaking Native Americans (American Indian) affiliated with the Powhatan Confederacy. The main village of the Chesepians was called Skicoak, believed to have been located along Tanner's Creek.

As the British Colony of Virginia expanded, the Native Americans were overwhelmed, initially moving further inland. In 1634, the original eight shires of Virginia (counties) were formed, and the area of Tanner's Creek was designated as within Elizabeth River Shire. (Despite popular misconception that the namings were related Queen Elizabeth I, both Elizabeth River Shire and the Elizabeth River were named to honor Princess Elizabeth Stuart, the daughter of King James I of England. She was the sister of the ill-fated Prince Henry and his younger brother Prince Charles, who later ascended to the throne as King Charles I). The naming of Tanner's Creek and Tanner's Point at its confluence with the Elizabeth River each derived from one of the early settler's and adjacent landowners, Daniel Tanner.

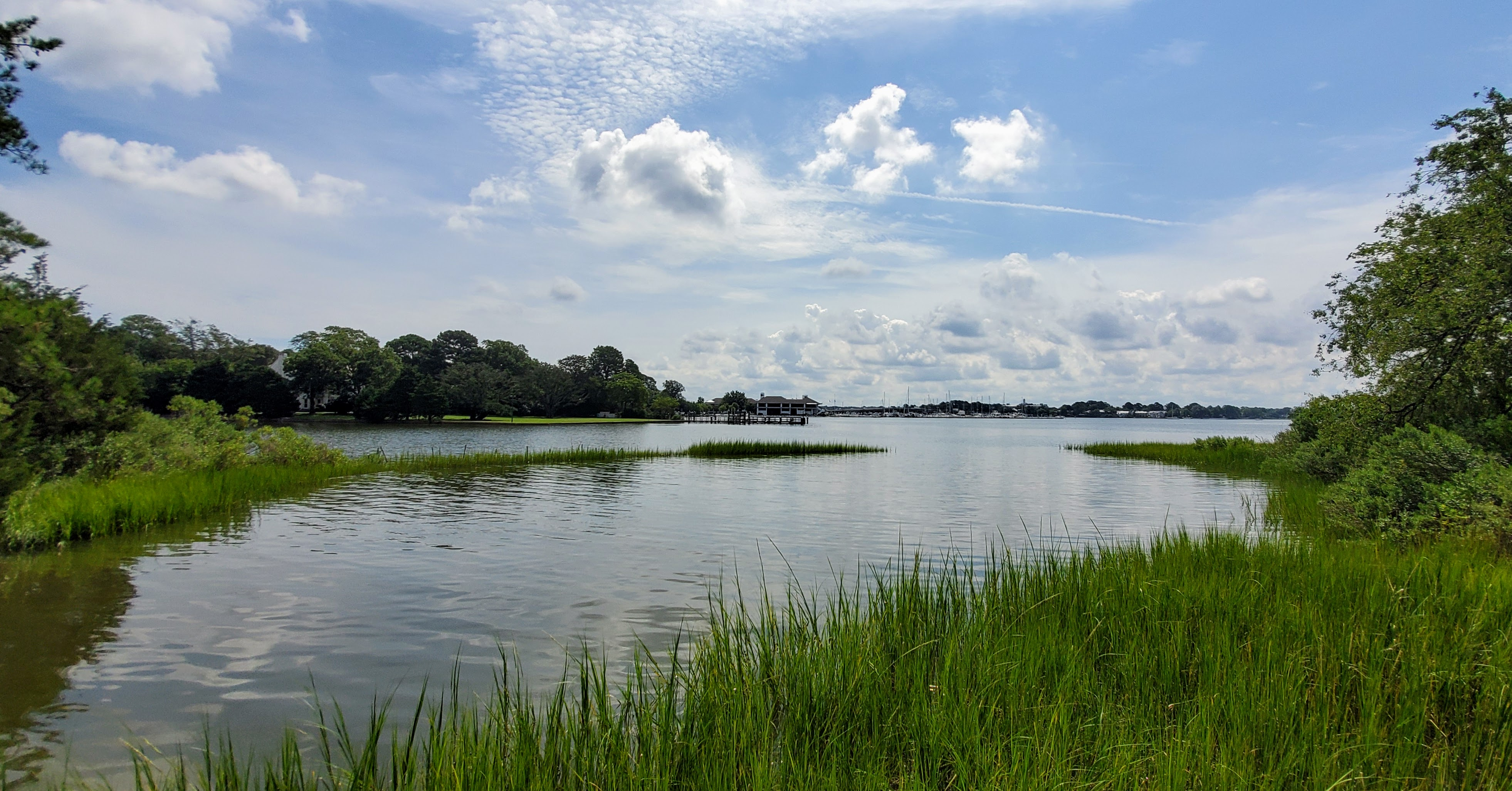
Lafayette River at morning from Hermitage Museum

The areas drained by Tanner's Creek became part of a subdivided area of the original shire in 1691 known as Norfolk County. Eventually, after a series of annexations by the growing and expanding commerce center of the independent city of Norfolk to the south, all of the waterway became located within the corporate limits. (The remaining portion of Norfolk County not previously annexed by the growing cities of Norfolk, Portsmouth and tiny South Norfolk were consolidated with South Norfolk to form the new independent city of Chesapeake in 1963).

In 1892, the City of Norfolk purchased the 114 acres (0.46 km^{2}) of land near Tanner's Creek for a park. It was named Lafayette Park in 1899. Soon after, Tanner's Creek was renamed the Lafayette River in honor of the Marquis de La Fayette, a French Army officer who became a popular American Revolutionary War hero as French forces aided with vital assistance in the achievement of United States' freedom from British rule.

== See also ==
- List of rivers of Virginia
