= Parsell =

Parsell is a surname. Notable people with the surname include:

- Stuart Parsell (1928–2015), American football coach and college athletics administrator
- T. J. Parsell (born 1960), American writer, filmmaker, and human rights activist

== See also ==
- Parcell
