= Parcel =

Parcel may refer to:

- Parcel (consignment), an individual consignment of cargo for shipment
- Parcel (package), sent through the mail or package delivery
- Bilu Rakkhosh or Parcel, a 2019 Indian Bengali-language film
- The Parcel, a 2020 Indian Bengali-language film
- Parcels (band), Australian modern soul band formed in 2014
- Fluid parcel, a concept in fluid dynamics
- Land lot, a piece of land
- Placer (geography), parcel in Portuguese, a type of submerged bank or reef
- an object used in the game Pass the parcel

== See also ==
- Package (disambiguation)
