= Parcell =

Parcell is a surname. Notable people with the surname include:

- Ben Parcell, English singer songwriter
- C. E. Parcell (1800s–1900s), American architect
- Gary Parcell (born 1933), Australian rugby league footballer
- Kenneth Parcell, a character in the NBC sitcom 30 Rock
- M. I. Parcell (1854–1916), American politician
- Malcolm Parcell (1896–1987), American artist
- Matt Parcell (born 1992), Australian rugby league footballer

== See also ==
- Parcel (disambiguation)
- Parcells (disambiguation)
