= Parcells =

Parcells is a surname. Notable people with the surname include:

- Bill Parcells (born 1941), former American football head coach
- Elizabeth Parcells (1951–2005), American coloratura soprano
- Heather Parcells, American actress, singer, and dancer

== See also ==
- Parcell
