= The Old Spaghetti Factory =

American casual dining chain

- Founded: 1969 in Portland, Oregon
- Founder: Guss Dussin
- Key people: Chris Dussin, David Cook
- Owners: OSF International (US); The Old Spaghetti Factory Canada Ltd.
- Website: American website Canadian website

The Old Spaghetti Factory is an Italian-American-style chain restaurant in the United States, Canada, and Japan. The American restaurants are owned by OSF International, based in Portland, Oregon, while the Canadian restaurants are owned by The Old Spaghetti Factory Canada Ltd. In 2003, the U.S. company had sales of $105 million. As of 2024, the U.S. company has 43 restaurants in 13 states and Japan. The U.S. firm also operated an Old Spaghetti Factory in Hamburg, Germany, from 1983 to 1993, but this was its only European location.

== History ==
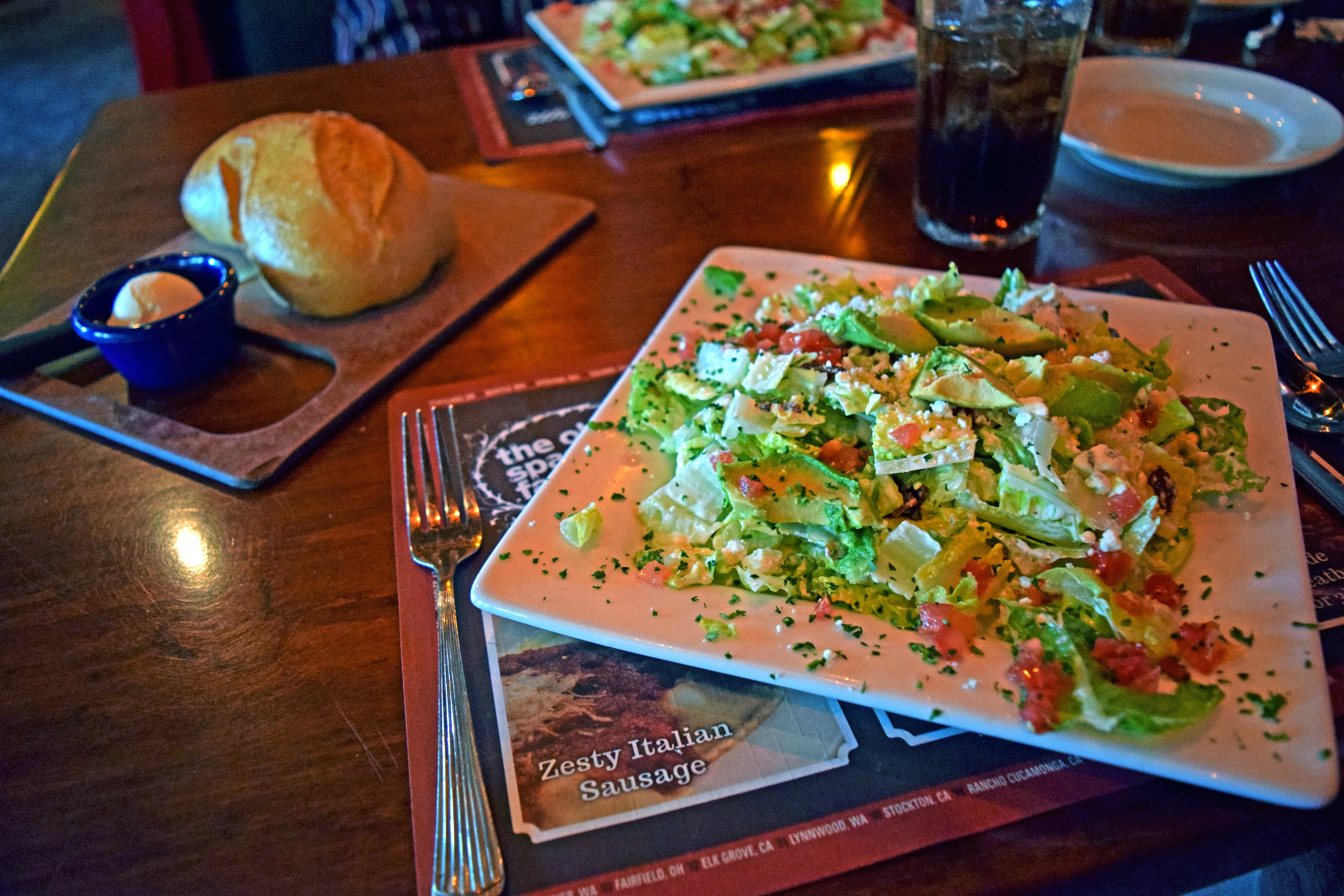
A BLT salad with pesto dressing and bread from The Old Spaghetti Factory

The chain was founded in Portland, Oregon in 1969, by Guss Dussin. OSF International is the corporate name of the original, Portland-based company, which had 4,200 employees as of January 1994, in the U.S. and Japan. The Canadian locations are owned by a separate company, the Old Spaghetti Factory Canada Ltd., based in Vancouver.

In 1983, the U.S. company opened an Old Spaghetti Factory in Hamburg, West Germany, which was its 20th location. The Hamburg restaurant was closed 10 years later, having been the chain's only European branch. The company cited high labor costs in Germany as the reason this location was not profitable. The U.S. company had $72 million in sales in 1993, and an estimated $90 million in 1998. After the Spokane, Washington, location opened in 1974, a 1996 review by The Spokesman-Review called OSF "one of Spokane's most popular restaurants" and "truly an institution" in the city.

An Old Spaghetti Factory restaurant opened in Sydney, Australia, in 1973, in the historic district of The Rocks; it was situated in the Metcalfe Bond Stores, which had been converted to offices, galleries, shops and restaurants. It seems to have been an instant success and was even visited by international celebrities (for instance, The Rolling Stones were photographed in a tram in the restaurant in 1973). By the second half of 1988, the establishment was being touted as a venue for "family fun".

By 2003, the U.S. company had 45 restaurants, in 14 states and Japan, and its sales in 2003 totaled $105 million. It had 3,500 employees at that time. In a 2004 article, The Oregonian newspaper wrote that "the key to the Old Spaghetti Factory's success has always been full-service meals at fast-food prices, served in large restaurants with intimate spaces created by Tiffany lamps, refurbished trolley cars and lots of gleaming brass." However, the article reported that the chain had recently recorded its first-ever same-store decline in sales as increasingly diet-conscious Americans were cutting back generally on their pasta intake. In response to that trend, OSF began adding some low-carb options to its menu but was not planning major changes.

== Decor and locations ==
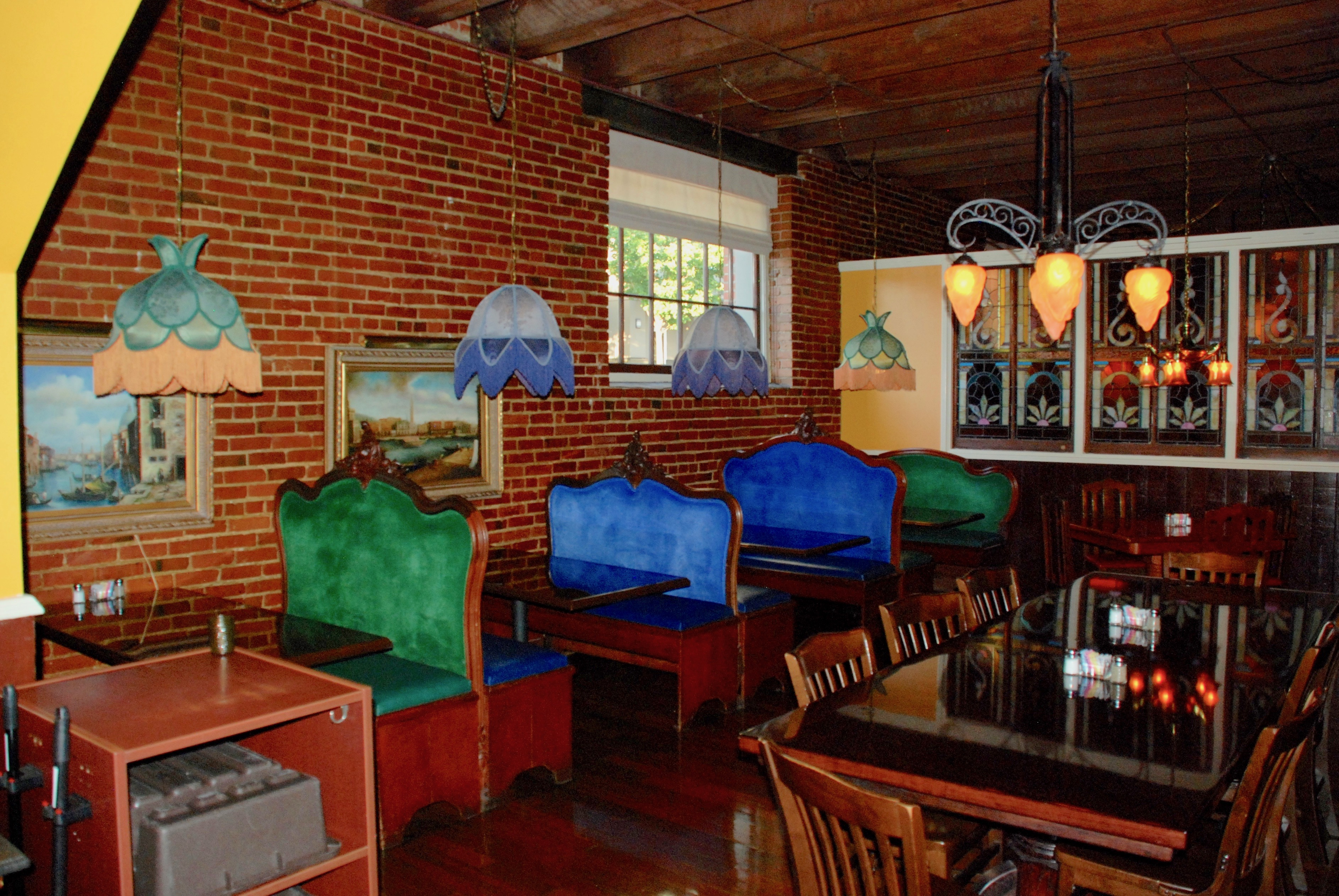
Interior of the Seattle restaurant, which, like many of the chain's restaurants, was located inside a historic former-industrial building

Many of the chain's restaurants are located inside renovated warehouses, train stations, and historic locations. The restaurant decor traditionally features antiques, including chandeliers, brass headboards, and footboards as bench backs for booths. Each restaurant's most prominent feature is a streetcar in the middle of the restaurant with seating inside.

The number of U.S. restaurants has fluctuated over the years. As of 1993, the U.S. chain had 30 restaurants in the United States and nine in Japan. In 2003, the U.S. company had 45 restaurants, in 14 states and Japan. In 2024, the number of U.S. locations stood at 43, in Arizona, California, Colorado, Hawaii, Indiana, Kentucky, Missouri, Ohio, Oklahoma, Oregon, Utah and Washington. The Old Spaghetti Factory (OSF) Japan locations were in Nagoya (closed 2013), Kobe and Kawagoe, Saitama (closed 2009). The downtown Seattle location, which opened in 1970 and was the second in the chain's history, closed in December 2016 due to the sale of the building. The brick and timbers from the Seattle location were reclaimed in a new building constructed on the site in 2025, as well as other preservation efforts made "in a nod" to the Spaghetti Factory.

The OSF location in Nashville, Tennessee, which was located in the city's popular Lower Broadway entertainment district, was destroyed in the 2020 Christmas Day bombing along Second Avenue. The landlord of the property subsequently terminated the restaurant's lease early, despite Old Spaghetti Factory announcing its intent to rebuild the structure and reopen the restaurant.

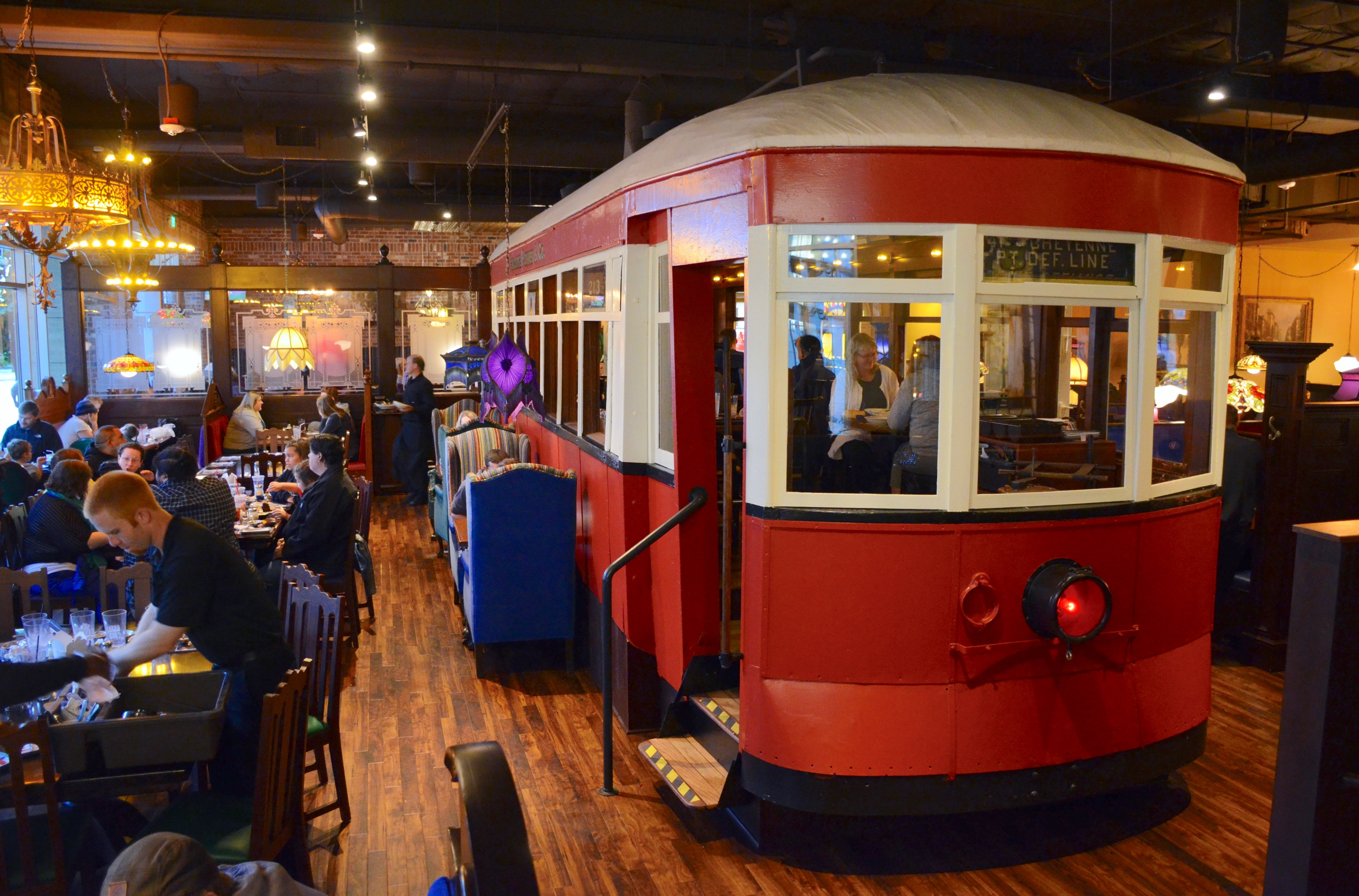
Vintage streetcar inside the Tacoma restaurant

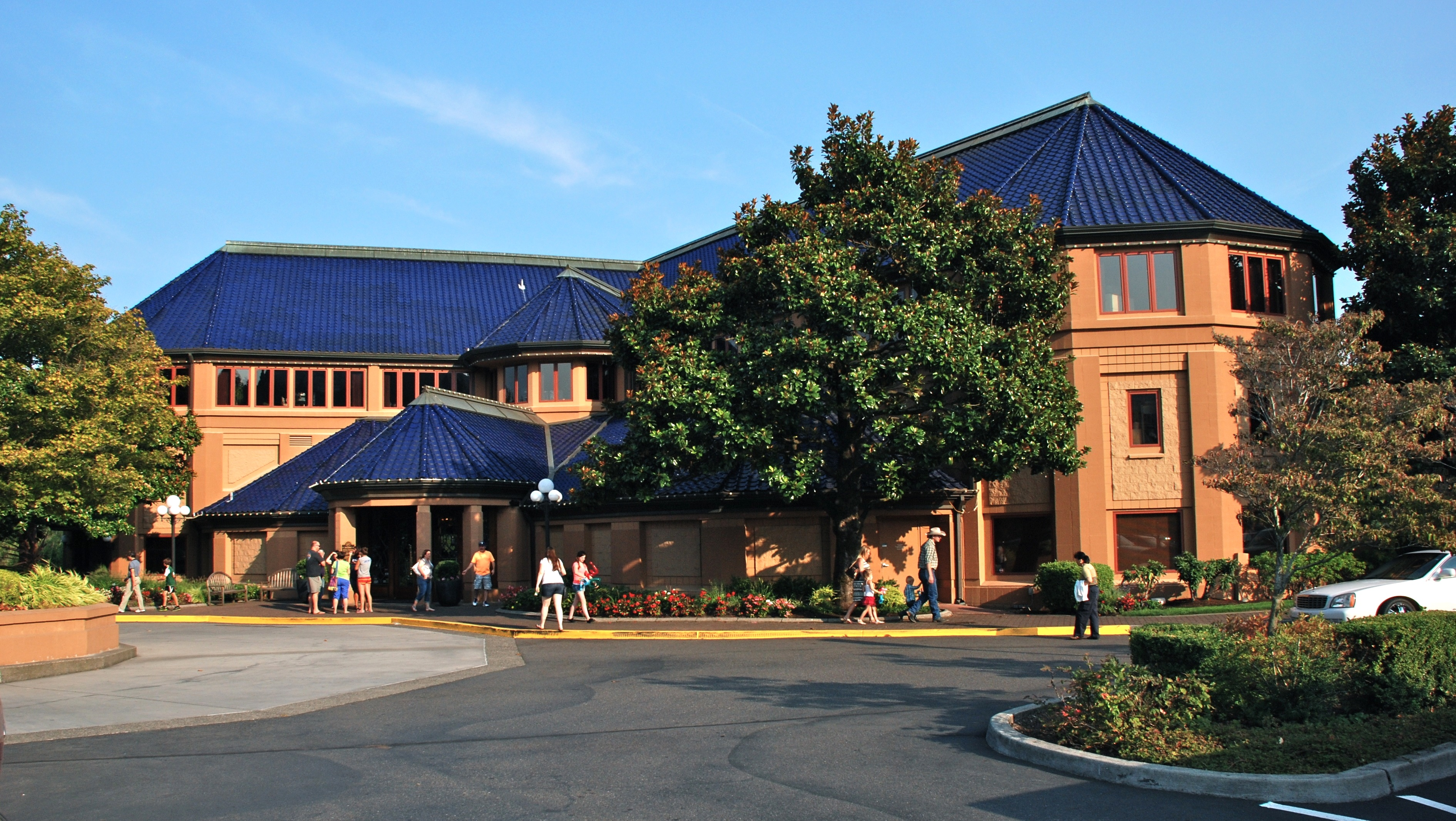
Portland, Oregon location in 2014

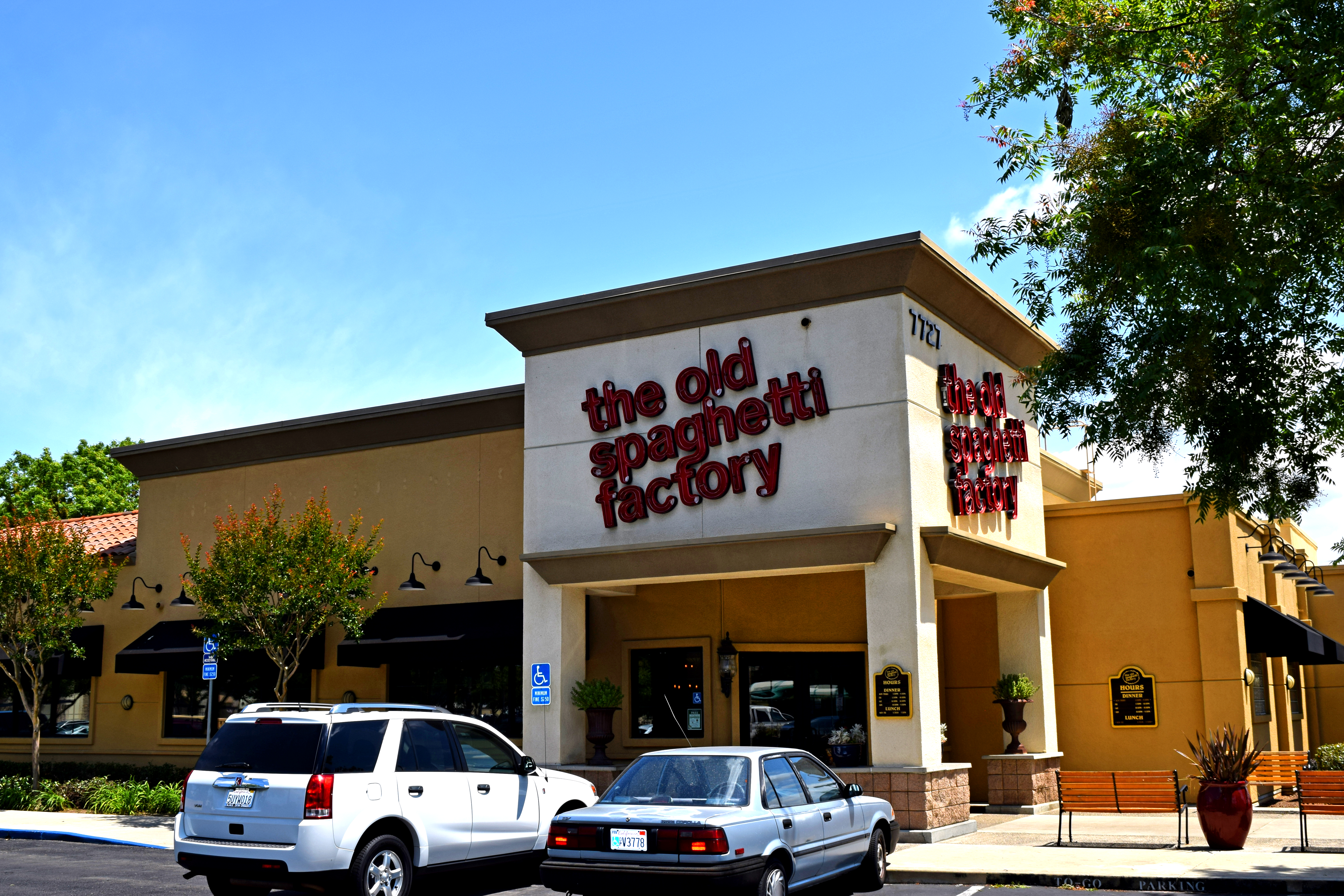
A location in Elk Grove, California

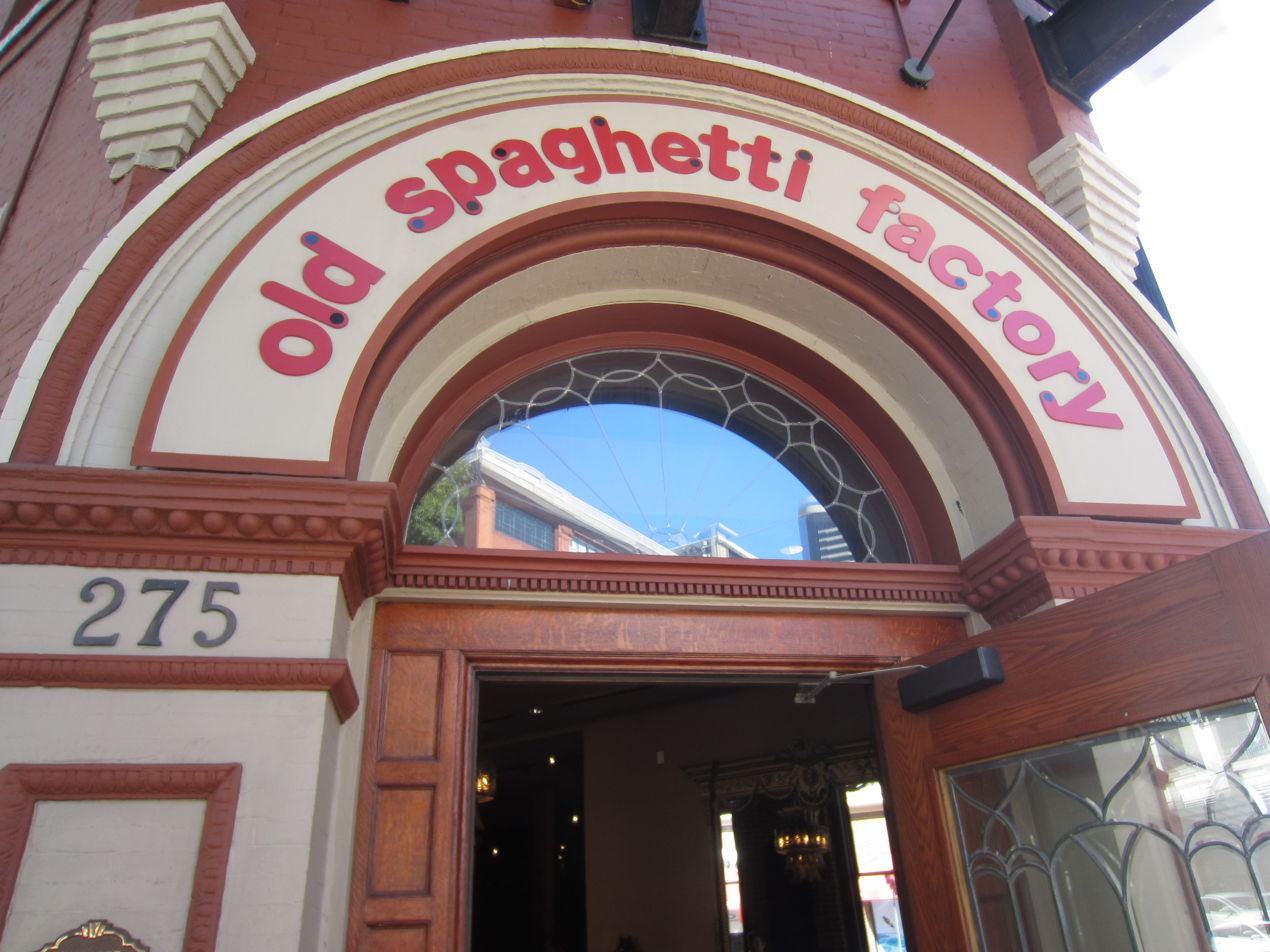
San Diego 2016

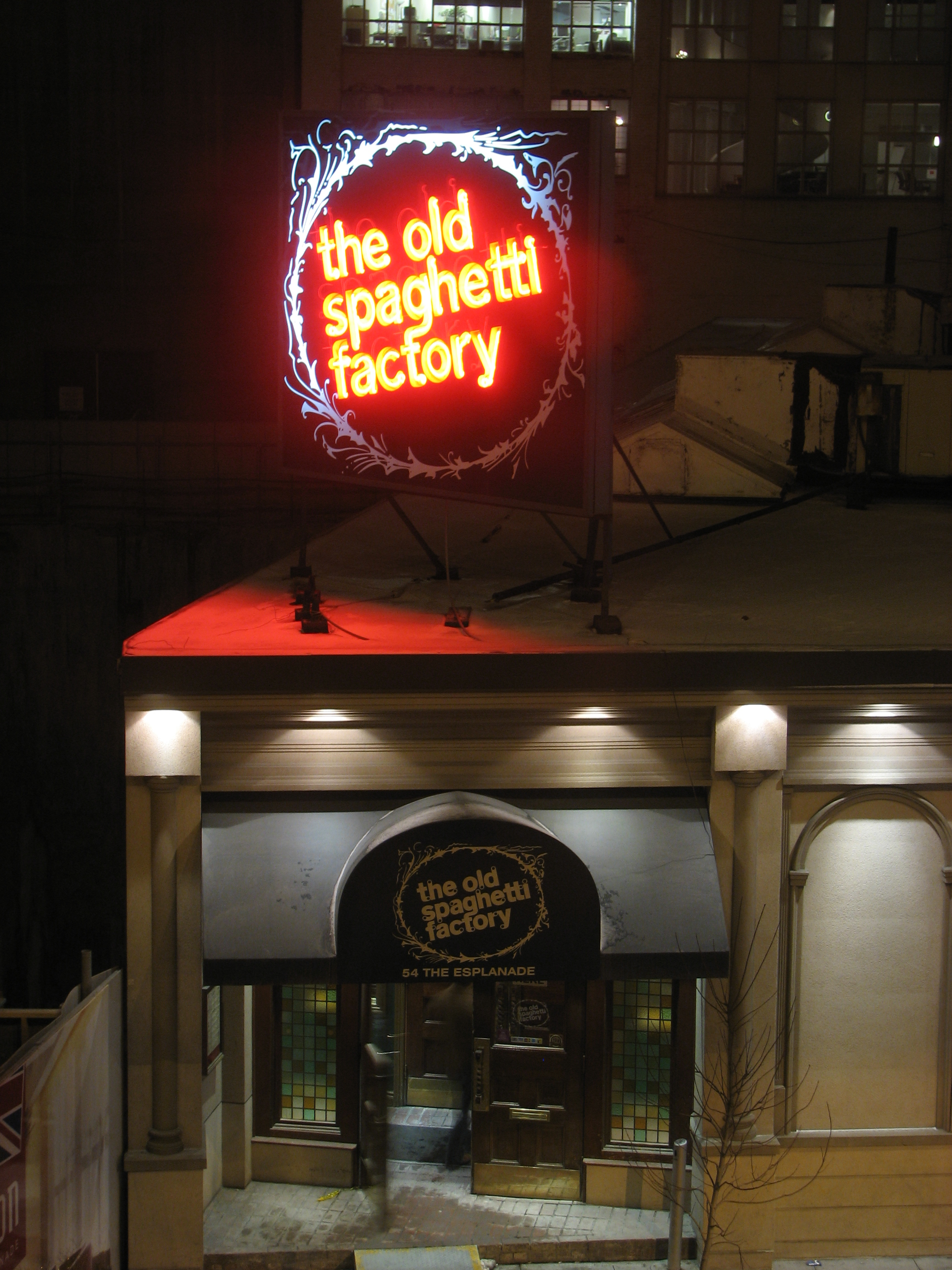
Toronto 2007

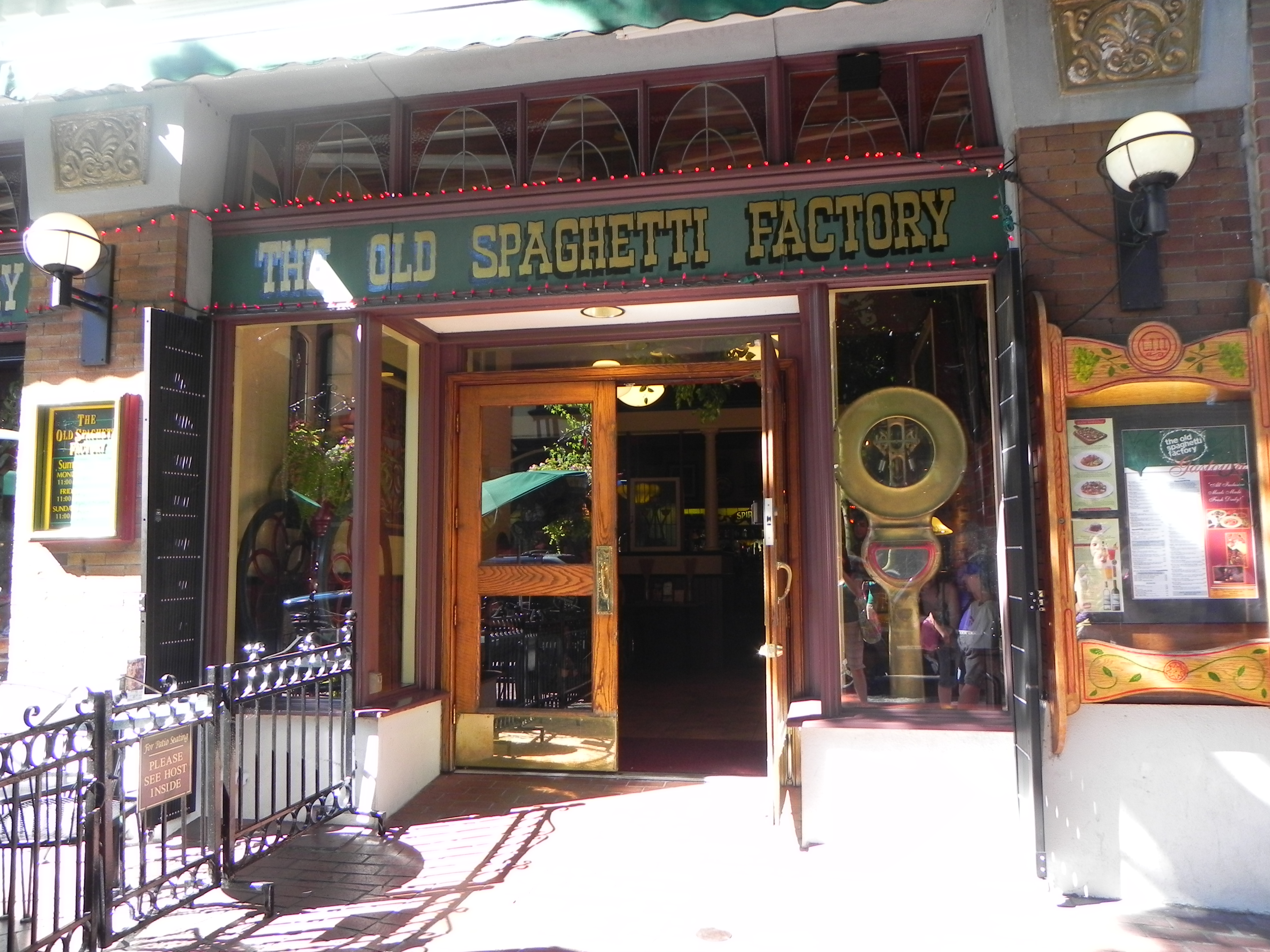
Vancouver in 2011

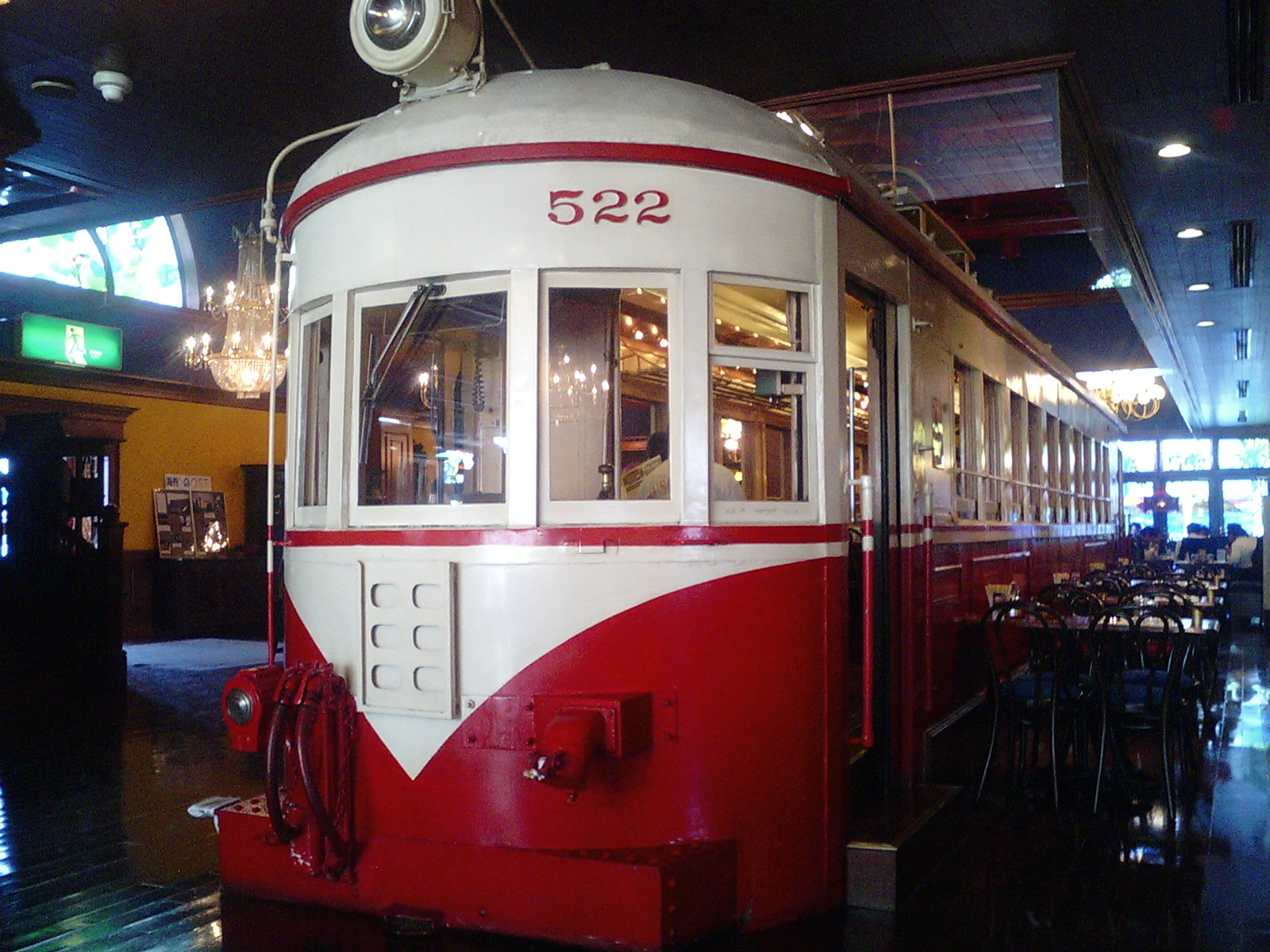
A former Meitetsu tram inside the Kawagoe branch of The Old Spaghetti Factory in Japan in 2006

== See also ==
- Spaghetti Warehouse
- List of Canadian restaurant chains
- List of Italian restaurants
