= Spaghetti Warehouse =

American restaurant chain specializing in Italian food

- Type: Private
- Founded: Dallas, Texas (1972; 54 years ago)
- Headquarters: United States
- Number of locations: 3 locations, 1 to-go only
- Subsidiaries: Frandeli, Inc.

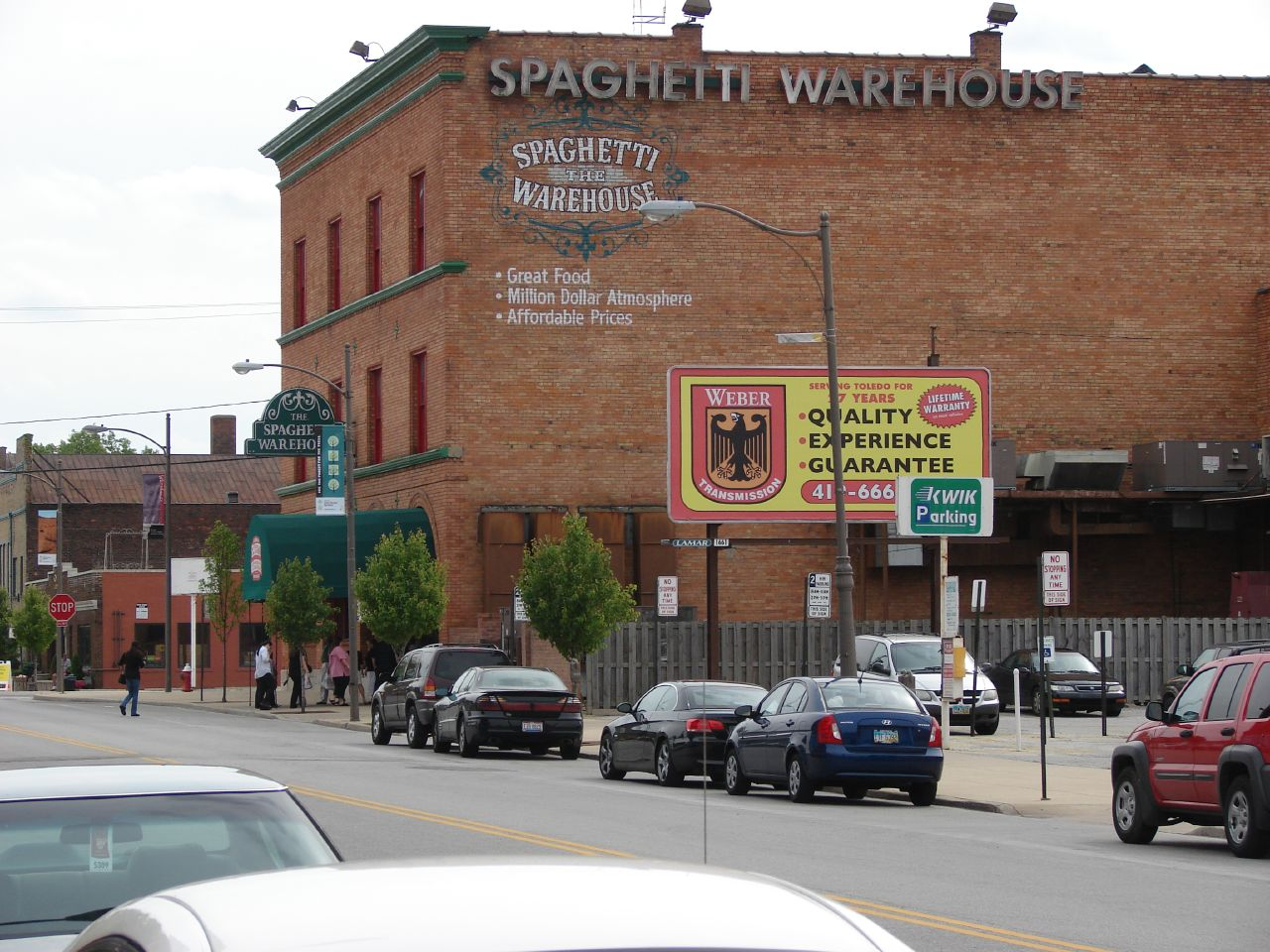
Exterior of the Toledo location

Spaghetti Warehouse is an Italian restaurant chain geared towards families with three physical locations in Ohio. They also operate a to-go only location in Texas. The chain started in 1972 in Dallas, Texas, and at one point had spread throughout the southern and eastern parts of the United States. Each restaurant has a trolley car in the dining room and patrons are able to sit in the car. One of Spaghetti Warehouse's unique characteristics is that many of the older locations are in renovated, historic buildings.

The former location in Columbus, Ohio, which opened in 1978, was the largest both in seating capacity and in sales. The original Columbus location sat approximately 800 people.

Spaghetti Warehouse, Inc., was acquired in 1998 by Consolidated Restaurant Cos. (a holding company of the private equity firm Cracken, Harkey & Co. L.L.C.). In June 2007, Consolidated Restaurants sold the chain to the Los Angeles–based investment firm Frandeli, Inc.

The Old Spaghetti Factory, which started in 1969, has a very similar format; as does Houston, Texas–based Warehouse 72 which is owned by Spaghetti Warehouse.

== Locations ==
=== Dallas, Texas (closed) ===
The original location, in the West End of Dallas, Texas, opened in 1972. The building was built in 1891 and served as a pillow factory for much of its history. It was home to many former brass bed headboards, an old confessional, and the headboard and footboard of a bed that belonged to Stephen F. Austin, which is now a booth that fits up to 8 people. An original East Dallas trolley car was in the main dining room. In October 2019, the location was shut down after 47 years. The confessional and Stephen F. Austin headboard were both confirmed to have been transferred to the Arlington location, which has subsequently closed, while small furnishings and select antiques were auctioned off online at the end of October 2019.

=== Austin, Texas (closed) ===
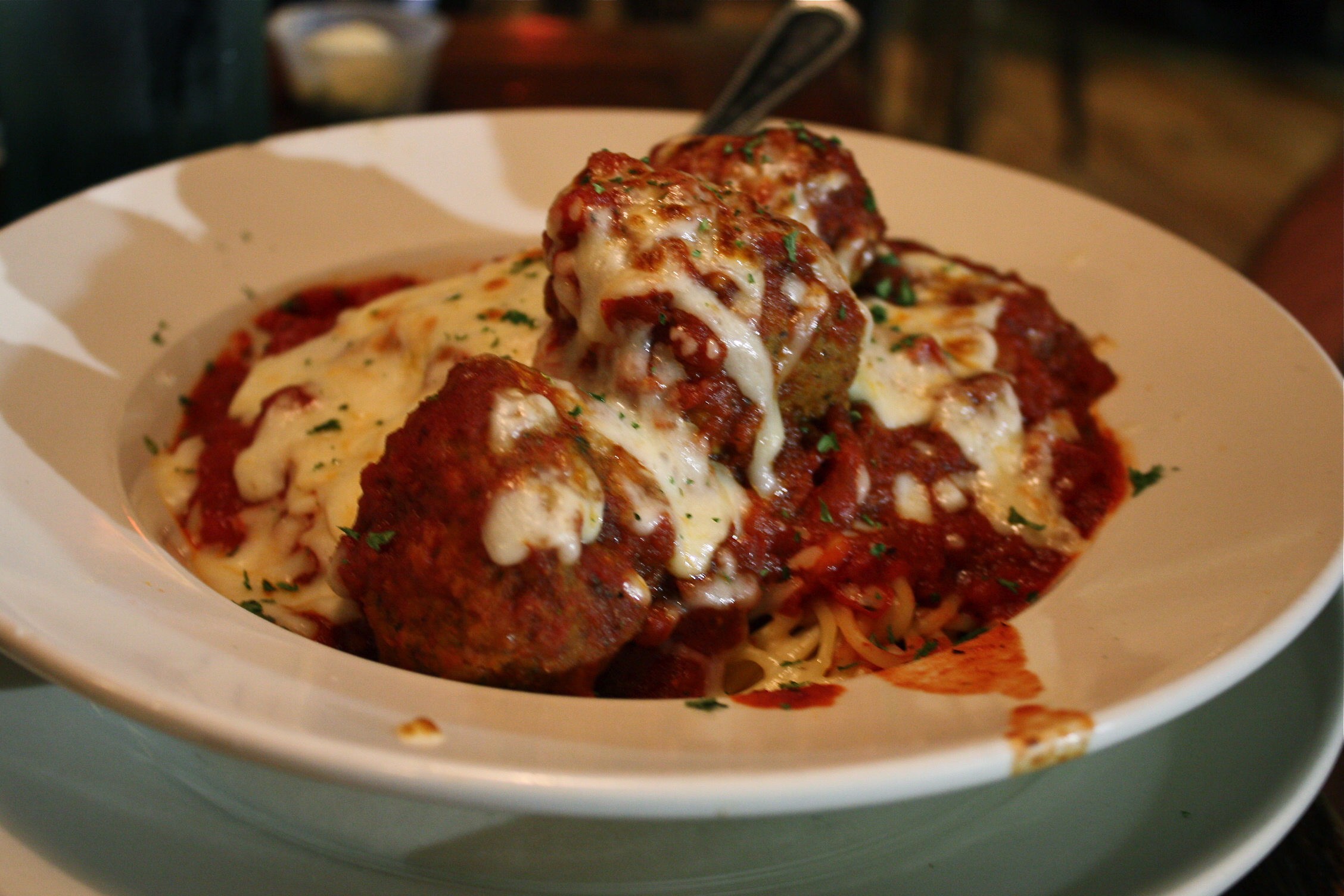
Spaghetti and meatballs from Spaghetti Warehouse

The Austin location was the third location in the chain's history. Opened in 1975, and built in 1902, it used to be a grocery warehouse, and during prohibition, was a brothel. Two chandeliers from New York City's Penn Station resided there as well as the original box office from Grauman's Chinese Theatre in Los Angeles, California. Like its Dallas counterpart, it was also home to an original East Dallas trolley car. The Austin location closed on April 23, 2011, due to physical building issues.

=== Columbus, Ohio ===
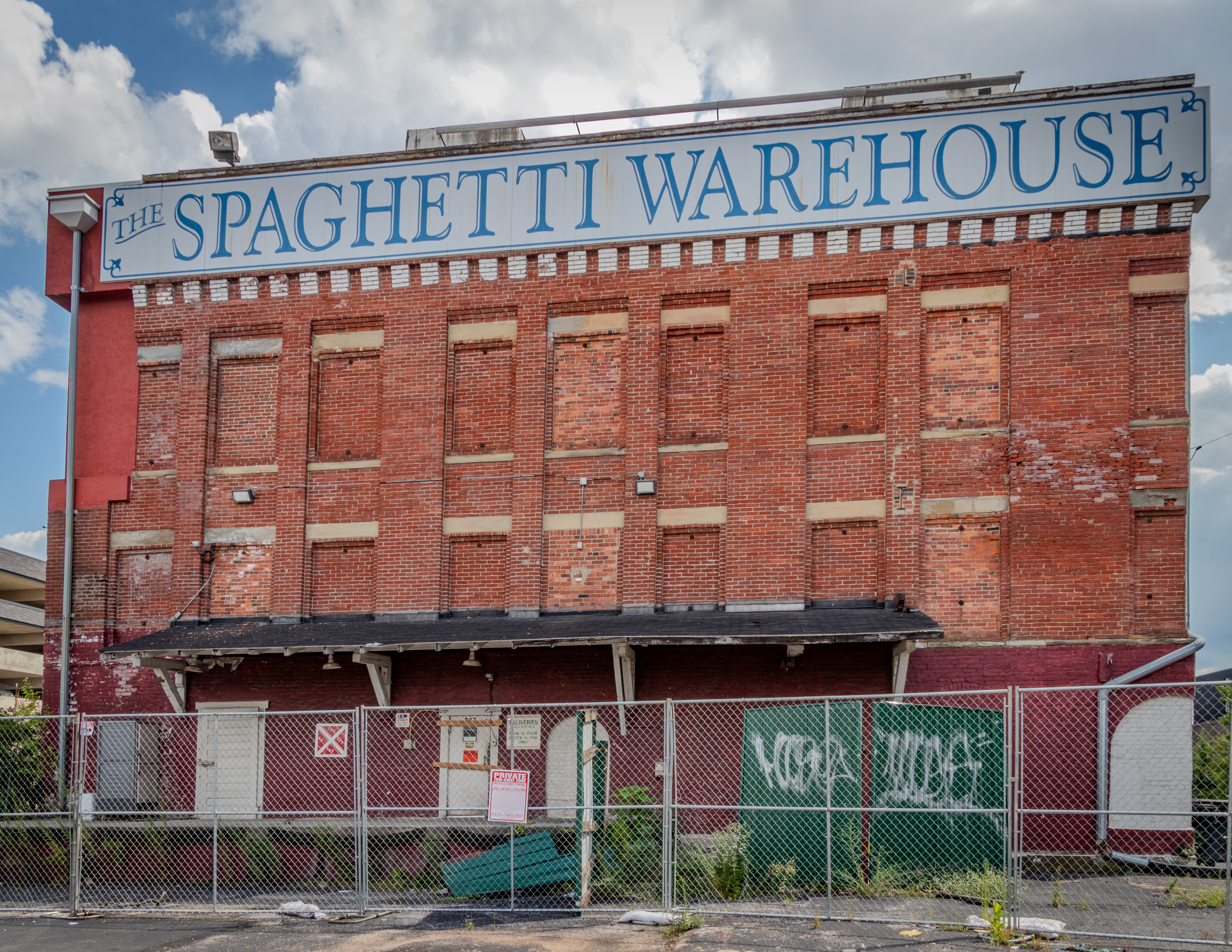
Spaghetti Warehouse in Columbus, Ohio (2024)

The Columbus location was the first Spaghetti Warehouse outside of Texas, and the fifth to open in the chain. It opened in April 1978 in an old ice house built in 1891. It is the largest in the company at 20,000 square feet and continually exceeds its counterparts in weekly sales. Located in the Franklinton area of Columbus, adjacent to its downtown district, it is a landmark in Columbus; many diners believe it to be the only location. In addition to the obligatory trolley car, it is home to two confessionals taken from churches in New England, as well as a 1920s German elevator in which patrons may sit for dinner. The original steam engine that kept the building cold when it was an ice house is still located in its lobby. Another artifact there is the head of a moose killed by former President Theodore Roosevelt, along with its certificate of authenticity.

On March 18, 2022, the 3-story Spaghetti Warehouse building in Columbus was evacuated after a partial roof collapse. The Columbus fire chief reported that the main support of the building's roof, which he described as the roof joist, collapsed. No injuries were reported, but the building was closed as unsafe until an inspection could be performed and the structure repaired if possible. The building, which has seven dining rooms and seats up to 800 patrons, had been renovated as recently as 2021.

On April 11, 2023, it was announced that they would be re-opening in a significantly smaller 200 seat location in a 6,000 square foot space on the first floor of the Highpoint on Columbus Commons luxury apartment building. This move, places the restaurant in the middle of the Downtown District within several blocks walking distance of the Ohio State House, the State Supreme Court, and multiple theaters, as well as numerous office and apartment buildings. This move was cited by the company as allowing them to modernize the dining experience, as well as the menu, while maintaining those aspects that long-time patrons valued most. In particular, the trolley car was confirmed as being integrated into the new space, but, as of April 11, no other feature of the original space has been confirmed to be transferring. The planned opening for the new location is said to be Fall 2023.

=== Akron, Ohio (closed) ===
The Akron location opened in 1992 on the site of a former B.F. Goodrich Company warehouse, adjacent to the former B.F. Goodrich Corporation Headquarters and tire plant which closed in 1988. The building was originally built in the 1870s as a warehouse for B.F. Goodrich tires. The Akron store featured a 20-foot chandelier that once belonged to the Dunes Hotel & Casino in Las Vegas, Nevada. This location featured several signs of former rubber tire companies (B. F. Goodrich Corporation, Firestone Tire and Rubber Company, General Tire and Rubber Company, and Goodyear Tire & Rubber Company) that once called Akron home, as well as old arcade games and antiques. Diners sat in an old hotel elevator, and a former Akron street trolley car. Although it is not one of the original warehouse type stores from the 1970s and 1980s, it was in a historical building in a historical area adjacent to the former B.F. Goodrich Corporation Headquarters and tire plant. On May 17, 2026 the Akron location closed its doors after 34 years of service.

=== Memphis, Tennessee (closed) ===
The Memphis location was inside a typical warehouse of the late 19th to early 20th century. It was decorated with an original trolley used for transportation in downtown Memphis, and with doors and light fixtures from Memphis Union Station which had been abandoned and razed in 1968 to make way for a new post office. When Elvis Presley returned from the Army on March 7, 1960, he was greeted in Memphis Union Station by a crowd of several hundred fans. The station was located about 0.6 mi (970 m) southeast of the restaurant's current site. The restaurant closed in mid-November 2017 after 30 years of service.

=== Houston, Texas (closed) ===
The Houston location was the company's second location and the second largest, after Columbus, Ohio. It opened in 1973 in Downtown Houston. Like the Dallas location, it had two floors of dining. During lunch, guests were seated in a trolley structure for their meal.

In late August 2017, Hurricane Harvey forced the restaurant to close as a result of water seeping through the top of the main floor, causing significant damage. It reopened in August 2019 as Warehouse 72/Butcher's Plates & Pizza, at the Marq*E Entertainment Center. While not officially a Spaghetti Warehouse anymore, the company still lists the location as providing to-go options from that menu due to customer enthusiasm. The former site became a McIntyre's bar upon renovation.

=== Ybor City, Tampa, Florida (closed) ===
The Tampa store was located in the former tobacco storage warehouse of the Ybor Factory Building in the historic neighborhood of Ybor City. The building was constructed in 1886 and was the largest cigar factory in the world at the time. The walls and floors of the restaurant consisted mainly of original exposed brick, and a replica of an Ybor City street car was located inside the main dining room. On March 4, 2016, it was announced this location would be closing. However, five days later the parent brand, BLD Brands, stated the location would remain open for another full year while another location is scouted. By October 2 the restaurant was out of business as efforts to save the building and relocate it were moot.

=== Little Rock, Arkansas (closed) ===
The Little Rock location opened on October 14, 1990, housed in the former Chicago, Rock Island and Pacific Railway passenger station. This historic building had opened in 1901 as the Choctaw Route station, but had been vacant since 1968, after being purchased by the preservation minded owners of the Arkansas Gazette. At the time this Spaghetti Warehouse location opened, it was reported to be the company's most expensive renovation to date, and part of the dining area also include a 1924 Pullman car, originally named Mt. Sheridan, which had been used by the Cotton Belt Railroad. Spaghetti Warehouse also acquired a neighboring antebellum mansion, the Alexander George house, which had previously served as a division headquarters for Rock Island. For four years, Spaghetti Warehouse worked with local preservationists in an effort to save this structure, which was finally razed in 1994, having been deemed by engineers to be too dangerous. The slow pace of downtown Little Rock redevelopment doomed the restaurant, and this location was closed on February 4, 1996. The former passenger station building is today part of the Clinton Presidential Center.

=== Norfolk, Virginia (closed) ===
The Norfolk location opened in 1991 and closed in 2001. It was housed in the Southern Bagging Company building, listed on the National Register of Historic Places in 2007.

=== Tulsa, Oklahoma (closed) ===
The Tulsa location opened in the historic Brady Arts District in 1992 and closed in late March 2017.

=== Syracuse, New York (closed) ===
The Syracuse location opened in 1989 in a factory building that was originally built by L.B. Doman in 1909 for his Amphion Piano Player Company (moving it from Elbridge, New York). The building was later used as a pocketbook factory (Julius Resnick, Inc.) and then as a bakery warehouse before being acquired by the restaurant chain. The facility permanently shut down on New Year's Eve 2025 after 36 years of service.

=== Current locations ===
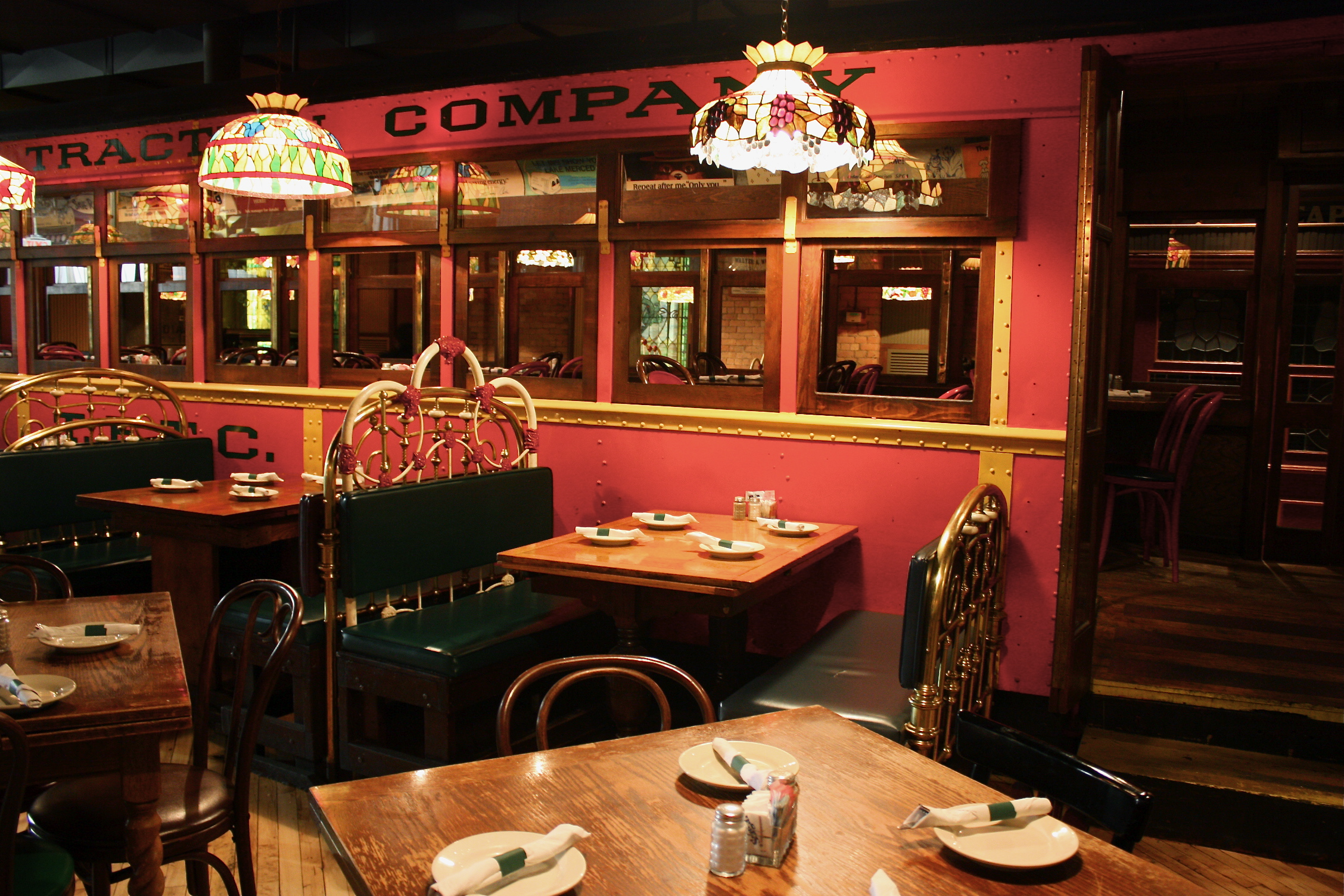
Interior of the Toledo location, with trolley car

- Columbus, Ohio
- Dayton, Ohio
- Toledo, Ohio

=== Current To-Go Only locations ===
- Houston, Texas, at Warehouse 72

=== Past locations ===
- Little Rock, Arkansas
- Hartford, Connecticut
- Fort Lauderdale, Florida
- Tampa, Florida
- Atlanta, Georgia
- Marietta, Georgia
- Aurora, Illinois
- Elk Grove Village, Illinois
- South Bend, Indiana
- Northampton, Massachusetts
- Springfield, Massachusetts
- Kansas City, Missouri
- Buffalo, New York
- Rochester, New York
- Syracuse, New York
- Charlotte, North Carolina
- Akron, Ohio
- Cleveland, Ohio
- Oklahoma City, Oklahoma
- Tulsa, Oklahoma
- Philadelphia, Pennsylvania
- Pittsburgh, Pennsylvania
- Providence, Rhode Island
- Columbia, South Carolina
- Greenville, South Carolina
- Knoxville, Tennessee
- Memphis, Tennessee
- Abilene, Texas
- Addison, Texas
- Arlington, Texas
- Austin, Texas
- Bedford, Texas
- Corpus Christi, Texas
- Dallas, Texas
- Fort Worth, Texas
- Irving, Texas
- Mesquite, Texas
- Plano, Texas
- San Antonio, Texas
- Stafford, Texas
- Willowbrook, Texas
- Glen Allen, Virginia
- Newport News, Virginia
- Norfolk, Virginia
- Richmond, Virginia
- Seattle, Washington

== See also ==
- List of Italian restaurants
- List of restaurants in Dallas
