= Ybor Factory Building =

Old cigar factory in Florida

- U.S. National Register of Historic Places
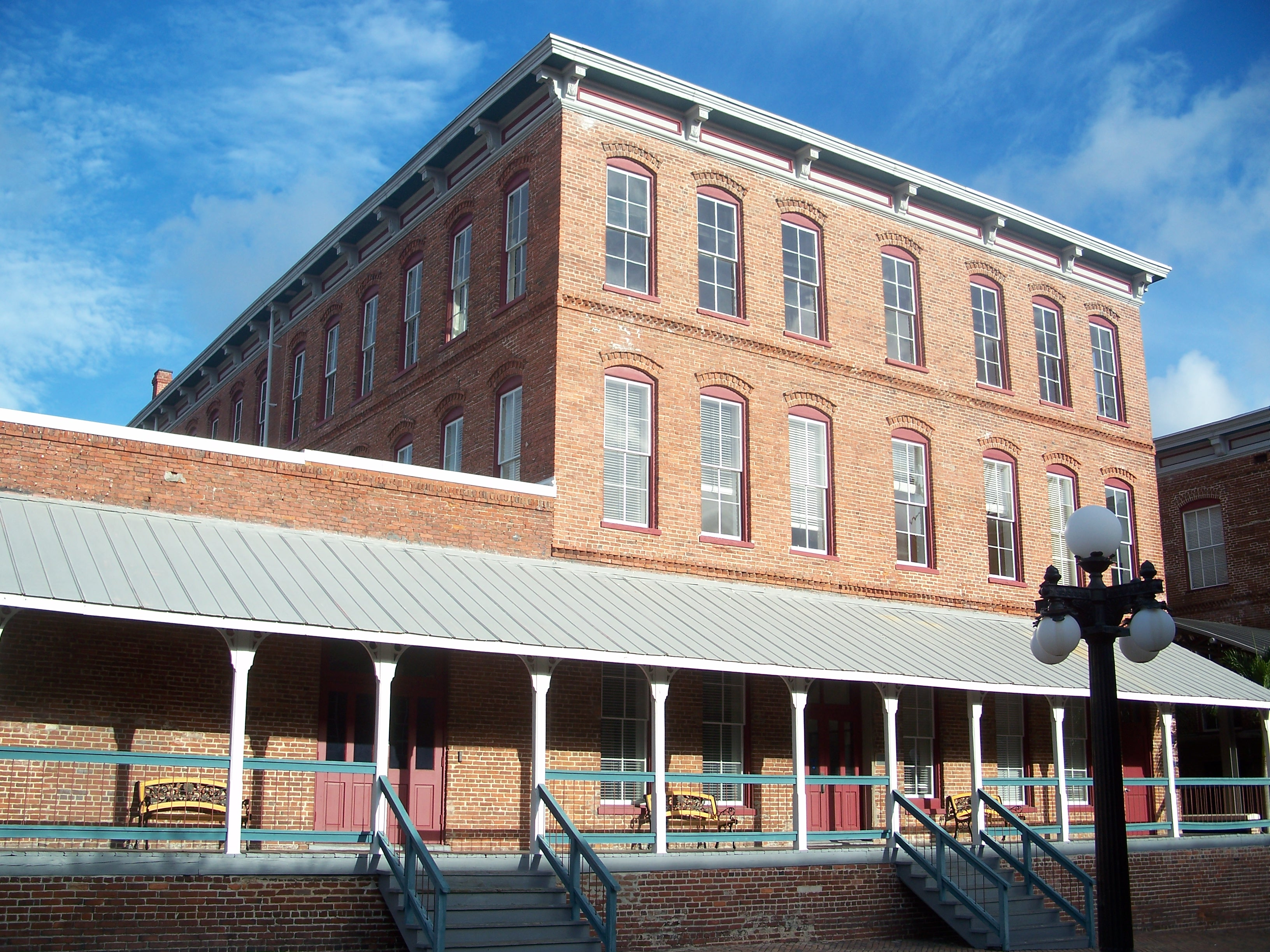

- Location within Florida Location within the United States
- Location: 1911 N. 13th St; Ybor City, Florida
- Coordinates: 27°57′41″N 82°26′42″W
- Area: less than one acre
- Architect: C. E. Parcell
- NRHP reference No.: 72000323
- Added to NRHP: November 15, 1972

The Ybor Factory Building is a historic site in Tampa, Florida, United States located at 1911 North 13th Street. The main factory and its surrounding support buildings cover an entire city block between 8th Avenue and 9th Avenues and 13th and 14th Streets in the Ybor City Historic District section of the Ybor City neighborhood. C. E. Parcell is credited as the building's architect.

== History ==
The factory was built in 1886 by Vicente Martinez-Ybor as he moved the production of his Príncipe de Gales ("Prince of Wales") cigar line from Key West to the new company town he founded just northeast of Tampa in 1885. The headquarters of Ybor's holding company was directly across 9th Avenue in the El Pasaje building, which was constructed at about the same time.

The three-story structure was the first brick cigar factory in Tampa and the largest cigar factory in the world at the time. Over the next few decades, skilled tabaqueros (cigar makers) would roll hundreds of millions of cigars on wooden workbenches set close together in the building's wide, sunlit rolling rooms.

After Ybor died in 1896, the building was owned by a succession of other cigar manufacturers and continued to be a productive cigar factory until after World War II, when the industry (and Ybor City in general) entered a long period of decline.

Over the next few decades, the buildings were vacant, then were used as gallery and studio space for artists, then converted to a festival marketplace called Ybor Square in the mid-1970s. The Ybor Factory building was added to the U.S. National Register of Historic Places on November 15, 1972.

In 2002, the buildings were converted to office space with the exception of a franchise of the Spaghetti Warehouse restaurant, which was located in the former tobacco storage warehouse up to 2016. In 2010, the Church of Scientology bought the building for $7.05 million to consolidate its existing facilities present in Ybor City and West Tampa.

== Gallery ==
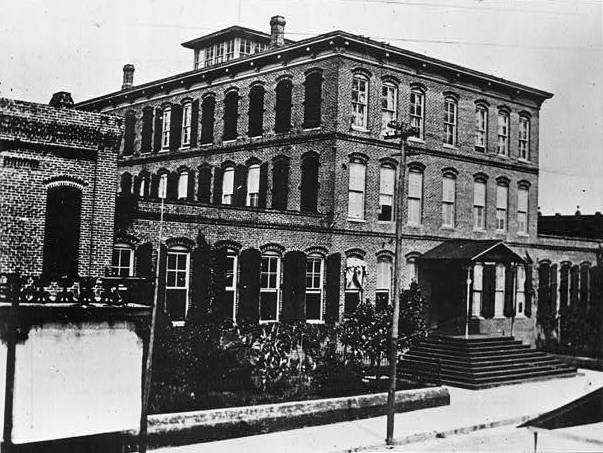
The factory c. 1916

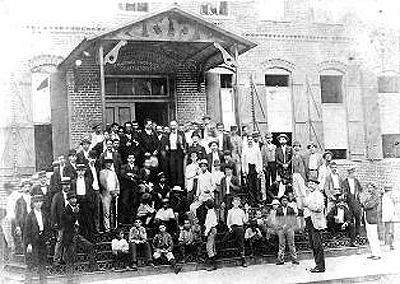
Jose Marti (center) with cigar workers on the steps of V. M. Ybor's cigar factory, 1893

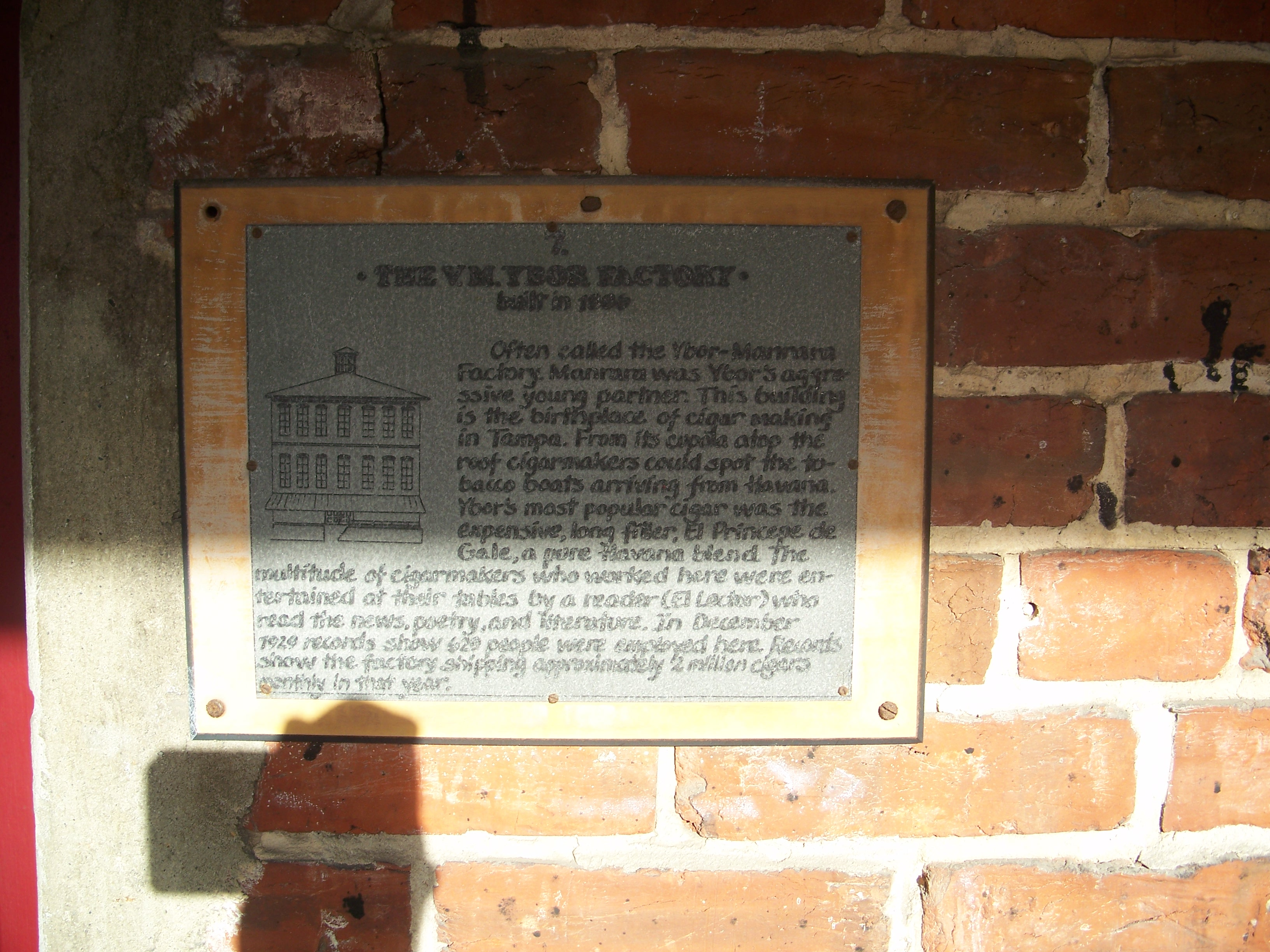
Historical marker

== See also ==
- History of Ybor City
- Ybor City cigar makers' strike of 1931
