= E.M. Hager & Sons Company Building =

- U.S. National Register of Historic Places
- New York State Register of Historic Places
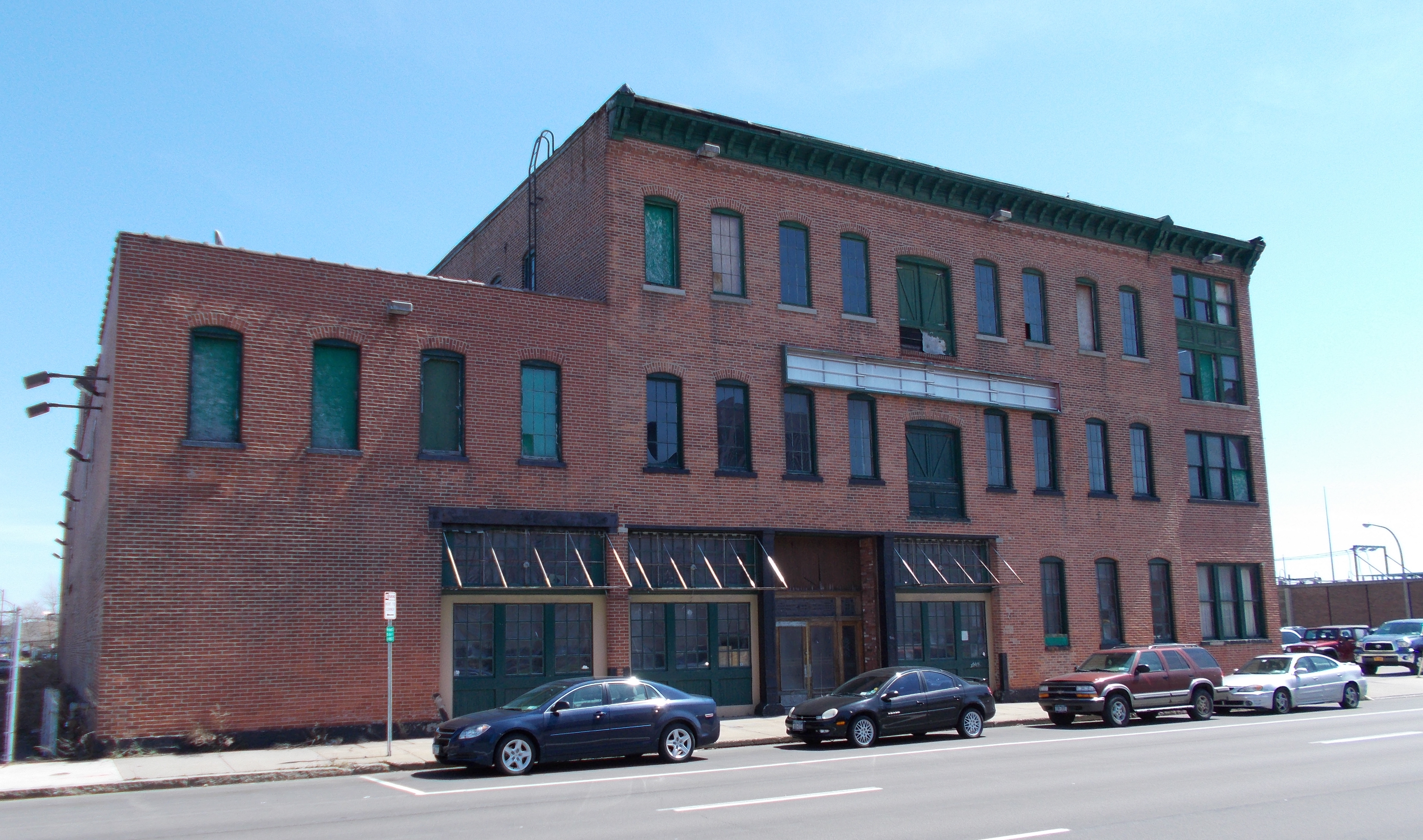
- E.M. Hager & Sons Company Building, April 2013

- Location within New York Location within the United States
- Location: 141 Elm Street, Buffalo, New York
- Coordinates: 42°53′07″N 78°52′10″W
- Area: less than 1 acre (0.40 ha)
- Built: 1878, c. 1880, c. 1920
- NRHP reference No.: 13000306
- NYSRHP No.: 02940.003103

Significant dates
- Added to NRHP: May 22, 2013
- Designated NYSRHP: March 29, 2013

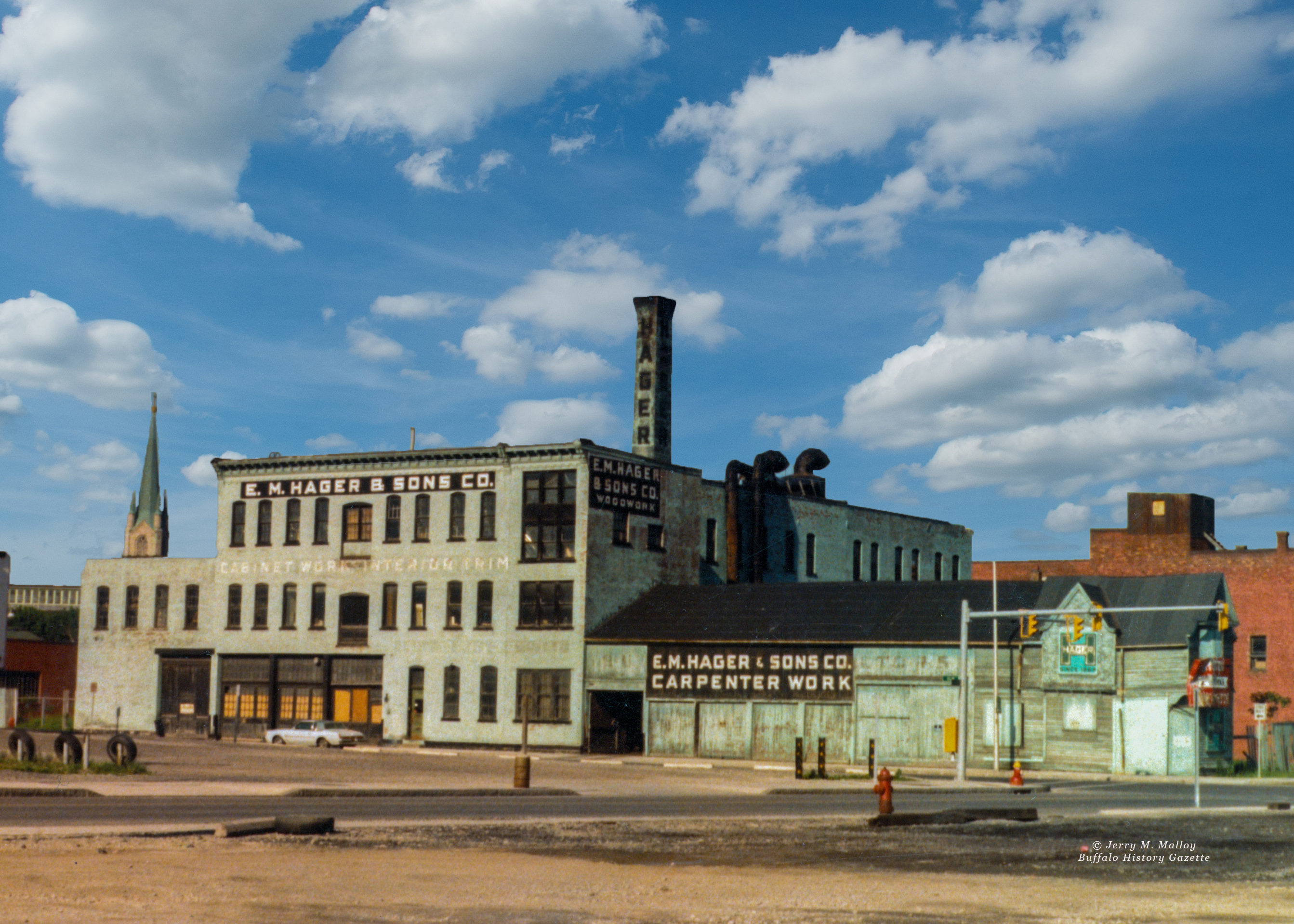
The Hager & Sons building in the late 1970s

E.M. Hager & Sons Company Building is a historic planing mill located in downtown Buffalo, Erie County, New York. The main section was built in 1878 and is a three-story brick building. Two-story additions were made to the main block about 1880, and a three-story wing about 1920. It features brick corbelling and segmental arched openings. E.M. Hager & Sons Company remained in operation until the 1980s, after which the building was converted to a restaurant (the Spaghetti Warehouse) and night club.

It was listed on the National Register of Historic Places in 2013.
