= Southern Bagging Company =

- U.S. National Register of Historic Places
- Virginia Landmarks Register
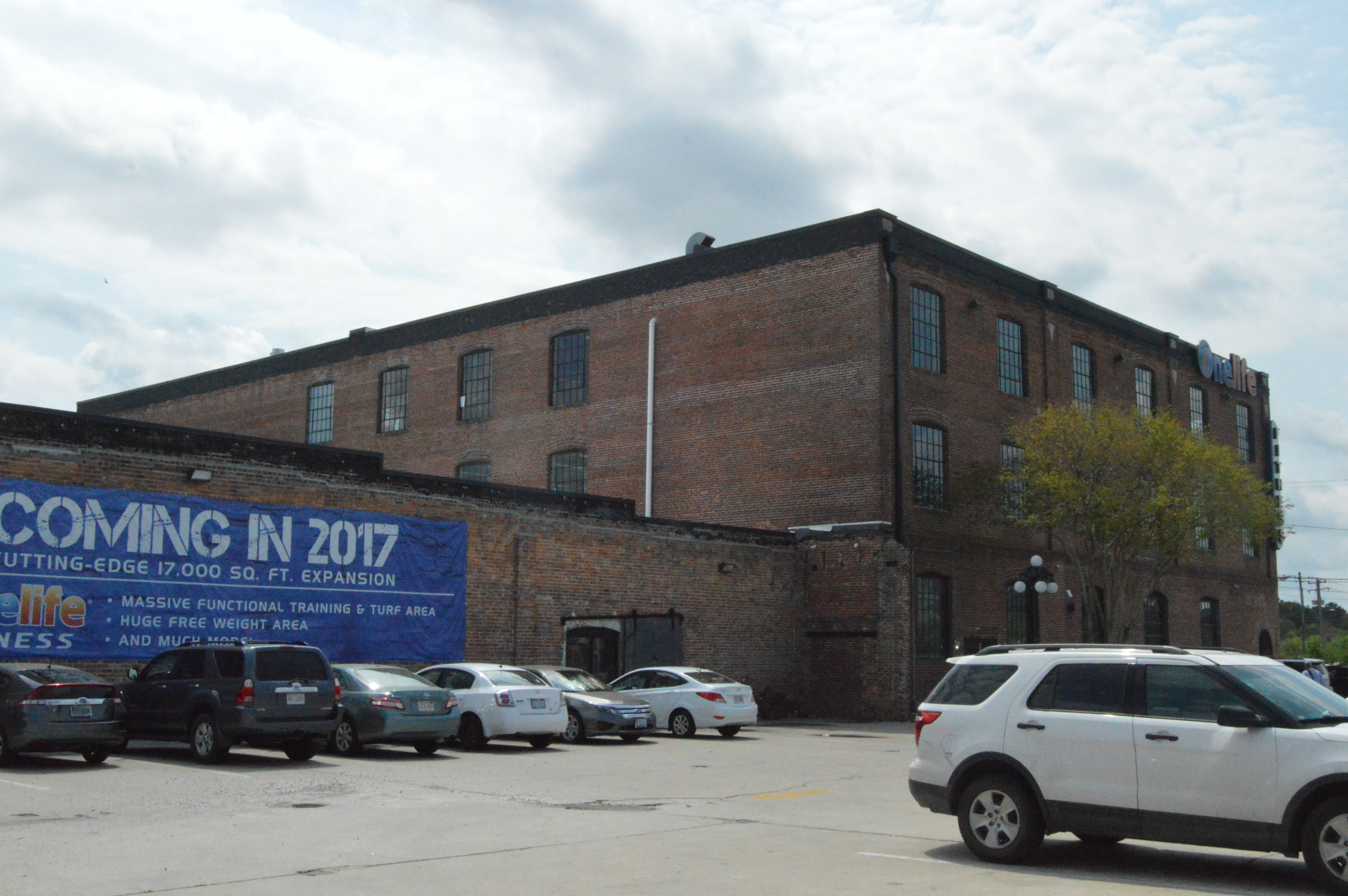
- Front and northern side

- Location within Virginia Location within the United States
- Location: 1900 Monticello Ave., Norfolk, Virginia
- Coordinates: 36°51′56″N 76°17′2″W
- Area: 0.7 acres (0.28 ha)
- Built: 1918
- Architectural style: Late 19th And Early 20th Century American Movements
- NRHP reference No.: 07000804
- VLR No.: 122-0993

Significant dates
- Added to NRHP: August 8, 2007
- Designated VLR: June 6, 2007

Southern Bagging Company, also known as Builders Supply Co. and Spaghetti Warehouse, is a historic factory building located at Norfolk, Virginia. It was built in 1918, and is a three-story, five bay by three bay, rectangular brick building. It has a flat roof and corbelled cornice. The building served as a manufacturing facility for bags for the shipping of cotton and agricultural products from the Norfolk harbor. The building subsequently housed Builders Supplies Corporation from 1924 to 1964. It housed a Spaghetti Warehouse restaurant from 1991 to 2001.

It was listed on the National Register of Historic Places in 2007.
