= Indrasis Acharya =

Indian film director

- ইন্দ্রাশিস আচার্য
- Born: Indrasis Acharya; Kolkata, West Bengal
- Occupations: Director, screenwriter
- Notable work: Bilu Rakkhosh, Pupa, The Parcel

Indrasis Acharya is an Indian film director working in Bengali cinema. He came to the prominence after directing his first feature film, Bilu Rakkhosh which won acclaim in both national and international sphere. Indrasis next worked in Pupa which got rave reviews and won many awards and accolades including All India Critic Choice Award for Best Bengali film of 2018 . It was in Hanoi international, Kolkata international film festivals and many more. Pupa won multiple awards and accolades around the globe including, Best Director and Best film awards. His third film was The Parcel for which he won the Best Director award (Hiralal Sen Memorial) at the 25th Kolkata International Film Festival.

== Early life ==
Indrasis Acharya has done his B.Tech. in Instrumentation and electronics from Jadavpur University after getting an honours degree in physics from Calcutta university. Currently, he is working in a renowned consulting MNC firm. He has completed his latest Parcel and working in a new feature Niharika (In The Mist)

== Career ==
Acharya's first feature film is Bilu Rakkhosh. The film captures a journey in search of peace and roads to the roots amidst this rapidly changing socio-technical world of synthetic emotions.

Acharya made his second film Pupa. The film won multiple awards and accolades from international and national film arena. Pupa was selected as a sole entry from Bengal in competition for Kolkata International film festival. It was in competition in Hanoi international film festival, Kolkata International film festival, Singapore South Asian film festival and many more. It won 4 best film awards including Critic choice award as Best Bengali film of 2018, WBFJA and many more along with multiple best Director award. Pupa deals with father son relationship The story is based on the conflict of a young mind to choose between a career in science or to be with ailing father where a man with wisdom (his uncle) comes to rescue him from dilemma.

The Parcel is third film by Indrasis Acharya. The film won Best Indian Director award from 25th Kolkata International film festival. The Parcel is a 2020 Indian Bengali, mystery cum psychological thriller film produced by Rituparna Sengupta and Krishna Kyal. The film features Rituparna Sengupta, Saswata Chatterjee, Anindya Chatterjee and Ambarish Bhattacharya in lead roles and Sreela Majumdar and Pradip Mukherjee as supporting characters. The story of the film revolves around a doctor-couple and Nandini, the protagonist, and mysterious parcels.

=== Filmography ===
Denotes films that have not yet been released

Year	Film	Writer	Director	Producer
2017	Bilu Rakkhosh	Yes	Yes	Aalekh
2018	Pupa	Yes	Yes	Addatimes
2020	The Parcel	Yes	Yes	Bhavna aaj O Kal & Krishna Kayal
2021	'Red Velvet' part of a Hindi Anthology Three Course Meal	Yes	Yes	Kefi entertainment
2023	Niharika	Yes	Yes	Pastel Entertainment & Vintage Motion Picturez

=== Short films ===
Acharya has made four short films till date namely UN-FAIR-Y, Oneker Moddhey Ekjon (One Amongst Many), Living beyond the Line, Ektu Antorikotar Jonno (For a Little Affection).

== Awards and recognition ==
Niharika (In the Mist)

• Official Selection - Adelaide Film Festival, 2022.

• Official Selection In Competition - 6th Hanoi International Film Festival, 2022.

• Official Selection in International Film Festival of Kerala (IFFK) - India Film Today

• Official Selection - Pune International Film Festival.

• Official Selection - Adelaide Film Festival, 2022.

• Best film ( critics) 2023 - Filmfare Awards

• Best Plyback 2023 - Filmfare Awards

The Parcel

- Best Indian Director - 25th Kolkata International Film Festival
- Official Selection PARCEL - Jogja NETPAC Asian film festival, Indonesia to celebrate one hundred years of Bengali Cinema.
- Best Film- Audience Choice Award, Indian Panorama, Diorama International film festival.
- Best Female Actor (Rituparna Sengupta ) Jury Award - 10th DC South Asian Film Festival, 2022.
- Official Selection- 19th Dhaka international film festival in Cinema of the World Section, USA
- Official Selection- In Competition, Melbourne Indian Film Festival.
- Official Selection- New York Indian Film Festival.
- Official Selection - In Competition St Andrews International Film Festival, Scotland

Pupa:

- In Competition- HANOI International Film Festival, Vietnam
- In Competition – Kolkata International Film Festival, India
- Asian Selection (Sole)- China Lanmei Film Week
- Invitation by London University for screening at Goldsmith Literary Seminar 2019
- Best Film (Bengali) - All India Critic Choice Film Award, Mumbai, 2018, CCFA.
- Best Film All Lights International Film Festival, India, 2018
- Best Film- Boston Indian Film Festival, 2018
- Best Film- Bengal Film Journalist Association, 2018
- Best Director, Best Actor, Best Sound Design in Aurangabad International Film festival
- Best Director- Hyderabad Film Festival,2018
- Best promising Director 2019 from NABC
- Special Jury Mention in Dada Saheb Film Festival,
- In Selection- Best Film for Hiralal Sen Award (West Bengal)
- In Selection- Film Fare Award 2018
- In Competition Pondicherry International Film Festival
- In Competition – Trissur International Film Festival
- Third Eye Asian film Festival, Mumbai
- Dhaka International Film Festival
- Habitat Film Festival.
- Singapore South Asian International Film Festival

Bilu Rakkhosh:

- Official Selection New York Indian Film festival in Competition
- Nominated for Best Actor Category in New York Indian Film Festival
- Official Selection Jagran Film Festival in Competition
- Official selection Third Eye Asian Film Festival
- Official selection Bodhisattva International Film Festival in Competition
- Official Selection Habitat Film Festival
- Official nomination Asia pacific screen awards, Brisbane, Australia.

== Upcoming project ==
He is working on his new film titled Gajoner Dhulobali (Dust and Pebbles) with Ritwick Chakraborty, Rituparna Sengupta, Loknath Dey, Deepak Haldar and others.

His first Hindi fiction Red Velvet as a part of a Hindi Anthology of three short stories is under Post Production now.
