= El Pasaje =

- U.S. National Register of Historic Places
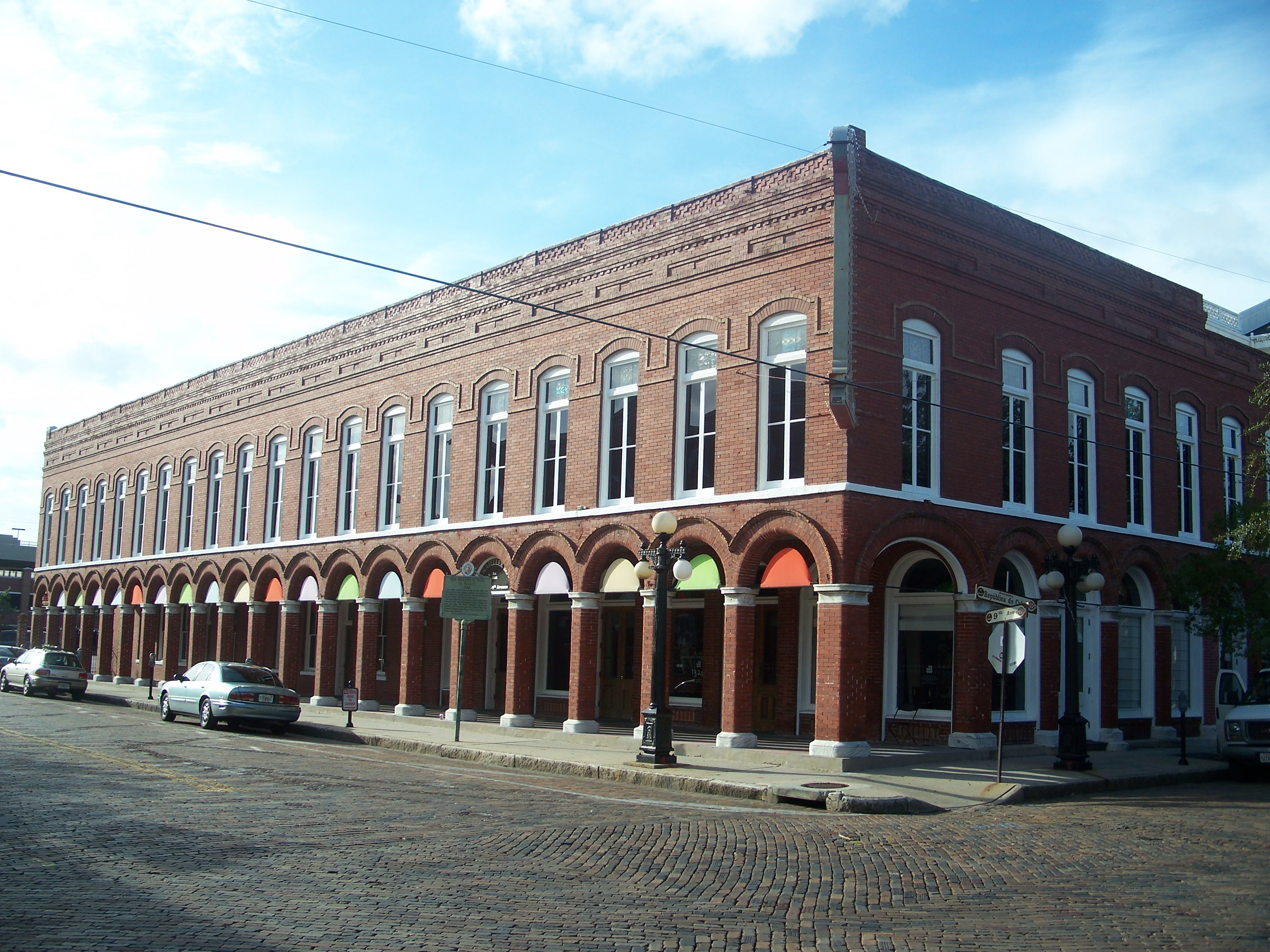
- Location: 14th St. and Palm Ave., Ybor City, Tampa, Florida
- Coordinates: 27.9618°N 82.4444°W
- Area: less than one acre
- Architectural style: Renaissance
- NRHP reference No.: 72000321
- Added to NRHP: November 15, 1972

The El Pasaje (also known as the Cherokee Club) is a historic site in Ybor City, Tampa, Florida. It was originally built in 1886 to house the offices for Vicente Martinez Ybor's companies as he planned Ybor City and then ran his cigar factory and other businesses. El Pasaje has been home to many establishments since: a hotel, several restaurants, several bars and speakeasies, a military recruiting station, and newspaper offices, among others. Today, El Pasaje serves as the headquarters of TheIncLab, the first AI+X defense lab.

The two-story brick building is located at the corner of 14th Street (Avenida Republica De Cuba) and East 9th Avenue across the street from Ybor's original cigar factory, what is today Ybor Square. On November 15, 1972, it was added to the U.S. National Register of Historic Places.

== Gallery ==
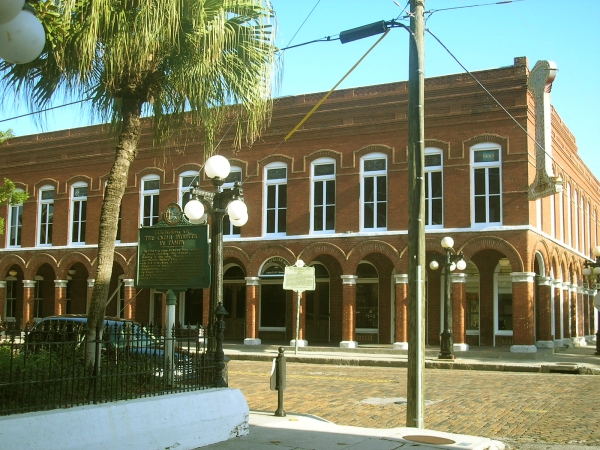
El Pasaje, one of the 1st buildings in Ybor City

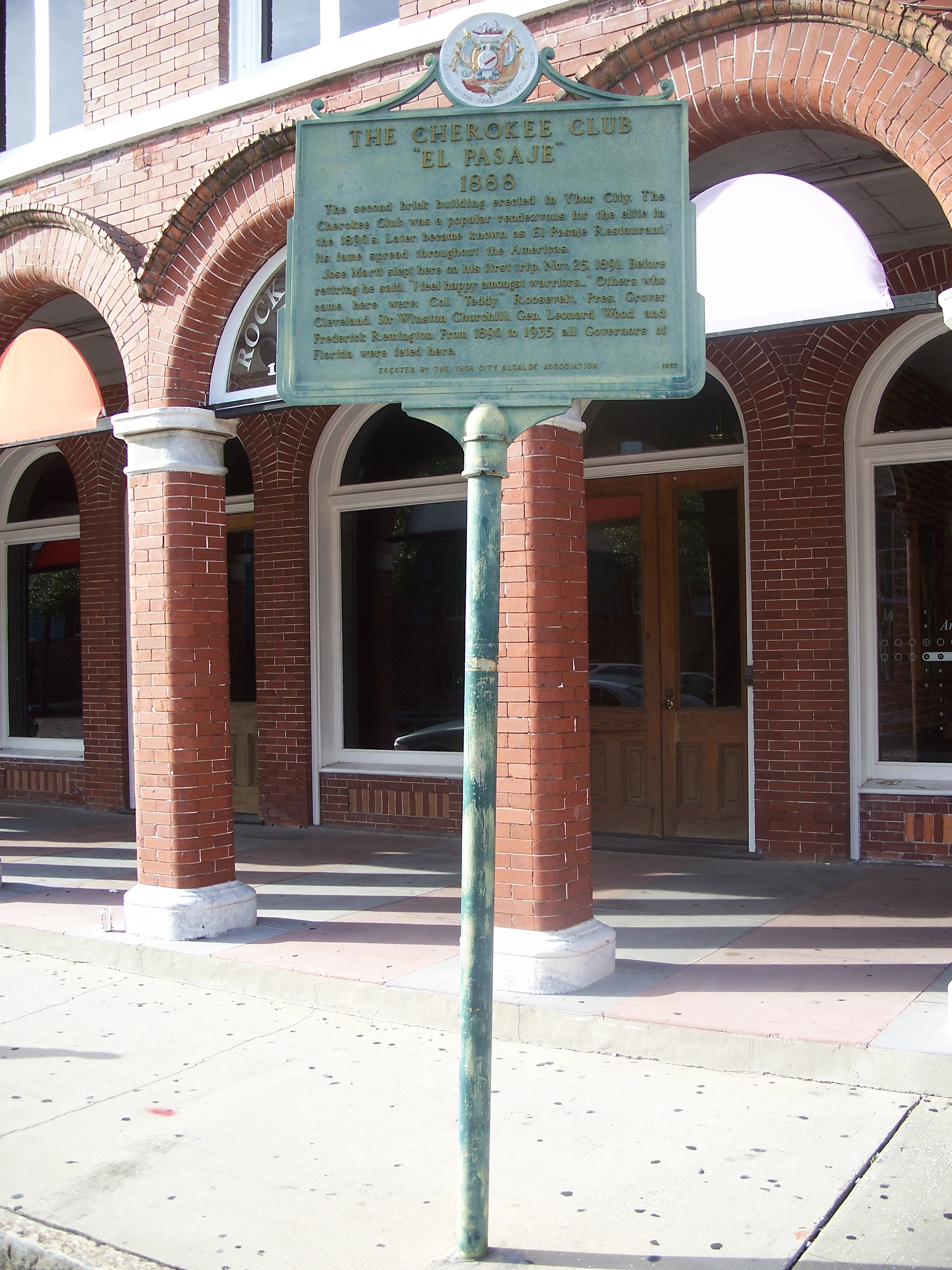
Historical marker

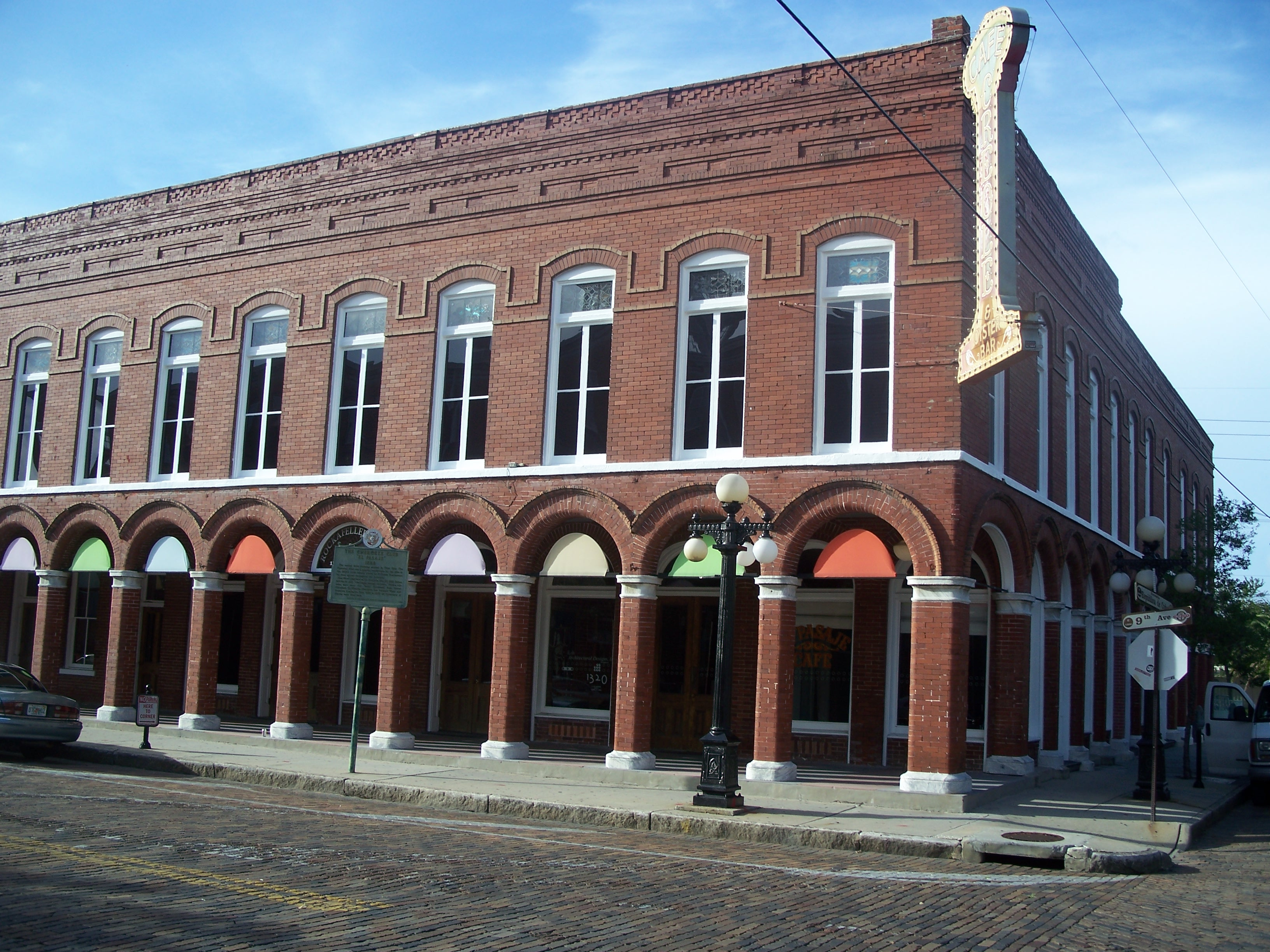

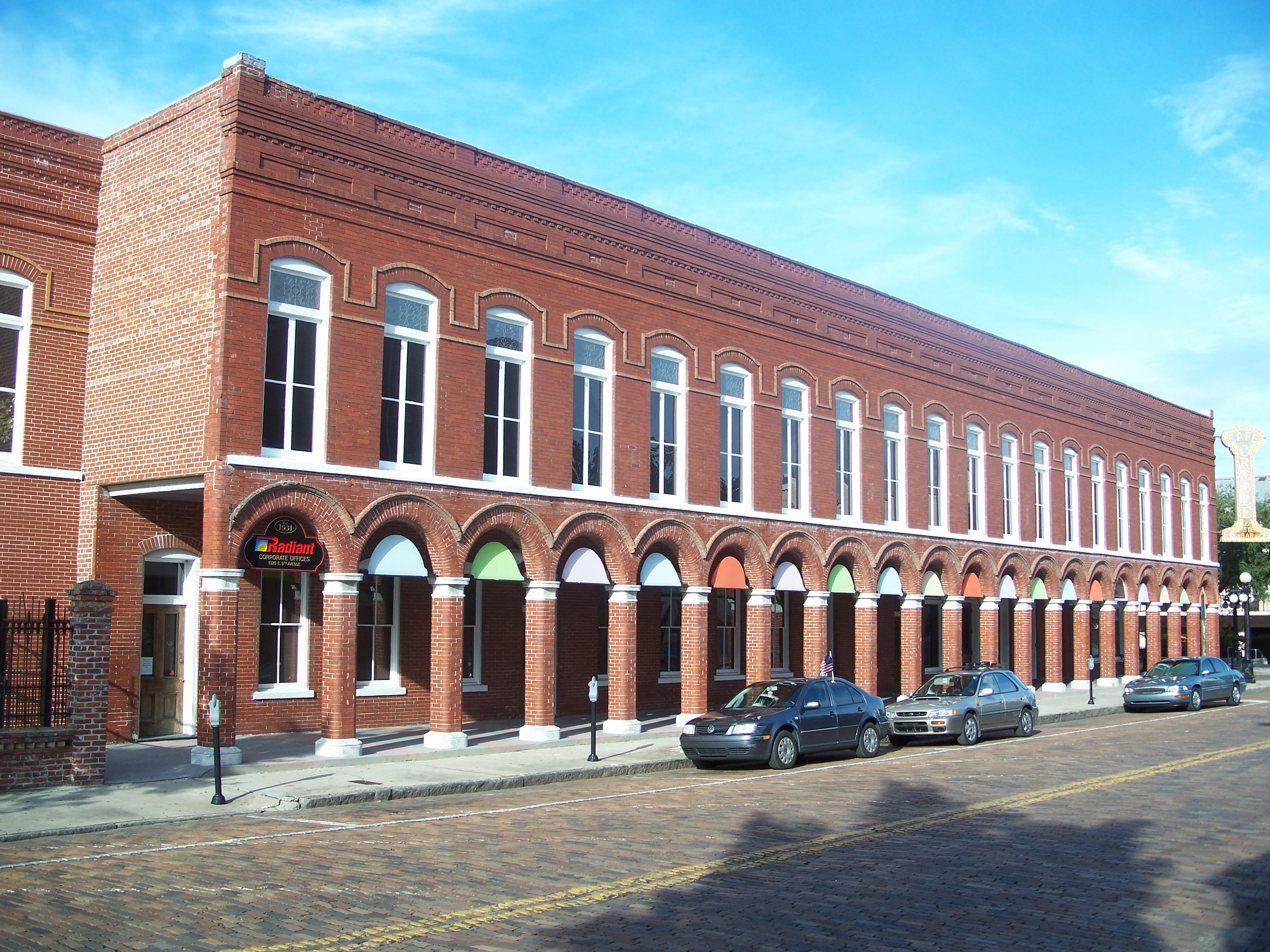
