= C. E. Parcell =

American architect

- Born: 1800s United States
- Died: 1900s United States
- Occupation: Architect

C. E. Parcell was an American architect. His work includes the Ybor Factory Building and worker housing, now a historic site located in Tampa, Florida, United States, added to the U.S. National Register of Historic Places on November 15, 1972.

== Gallery ==
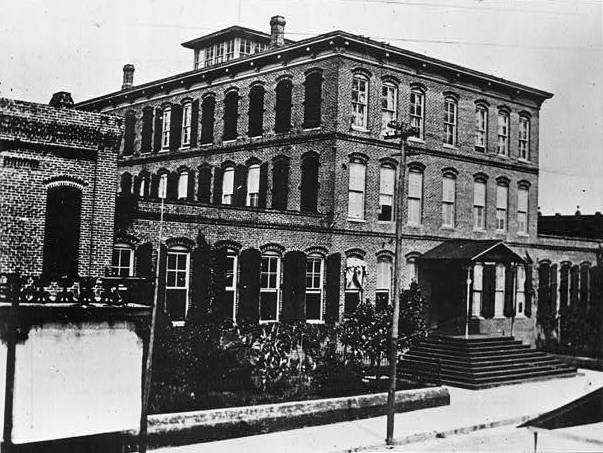
Ybor Factory Building (c. 1902)

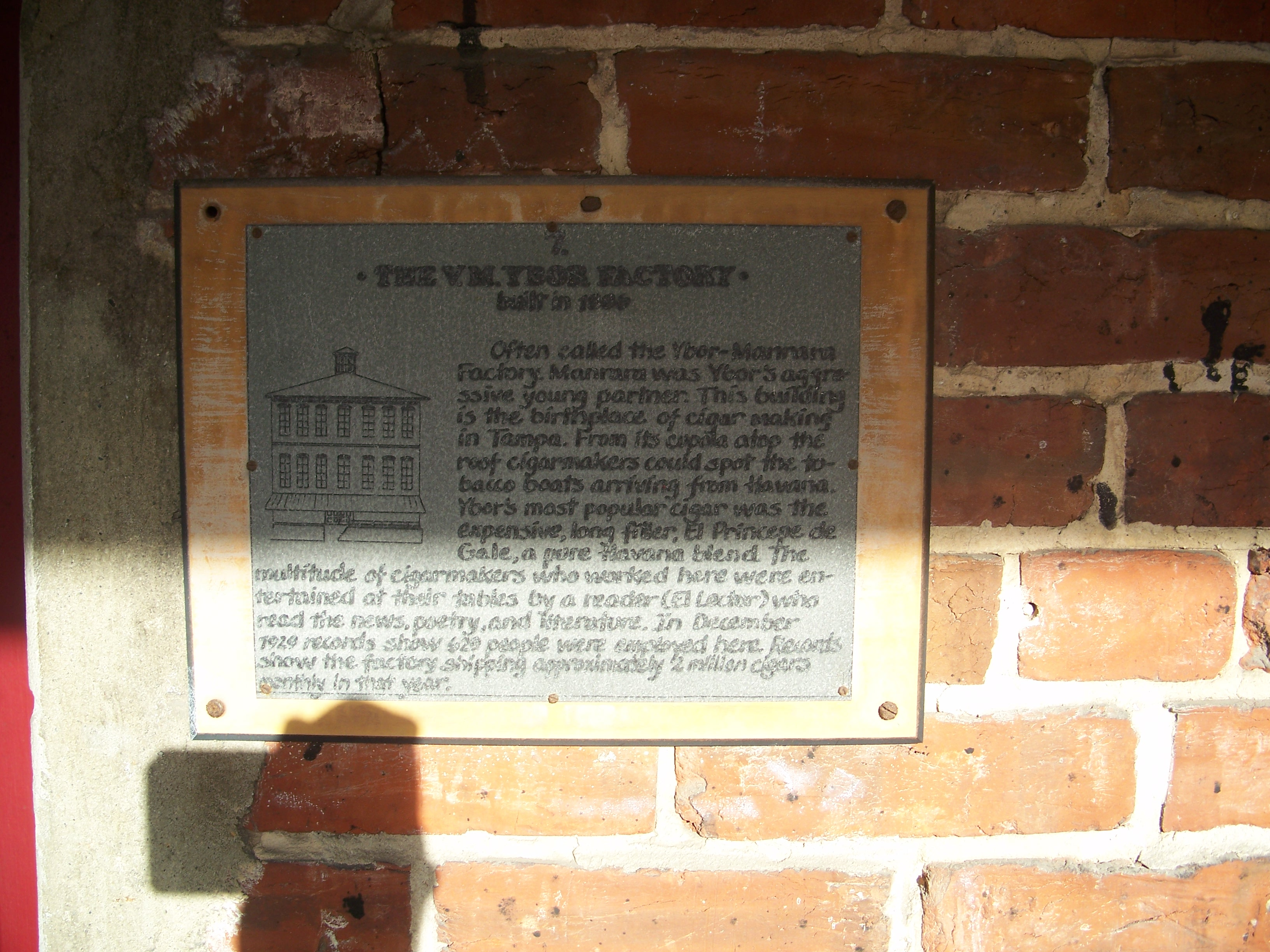
Ybor Factory Building signature

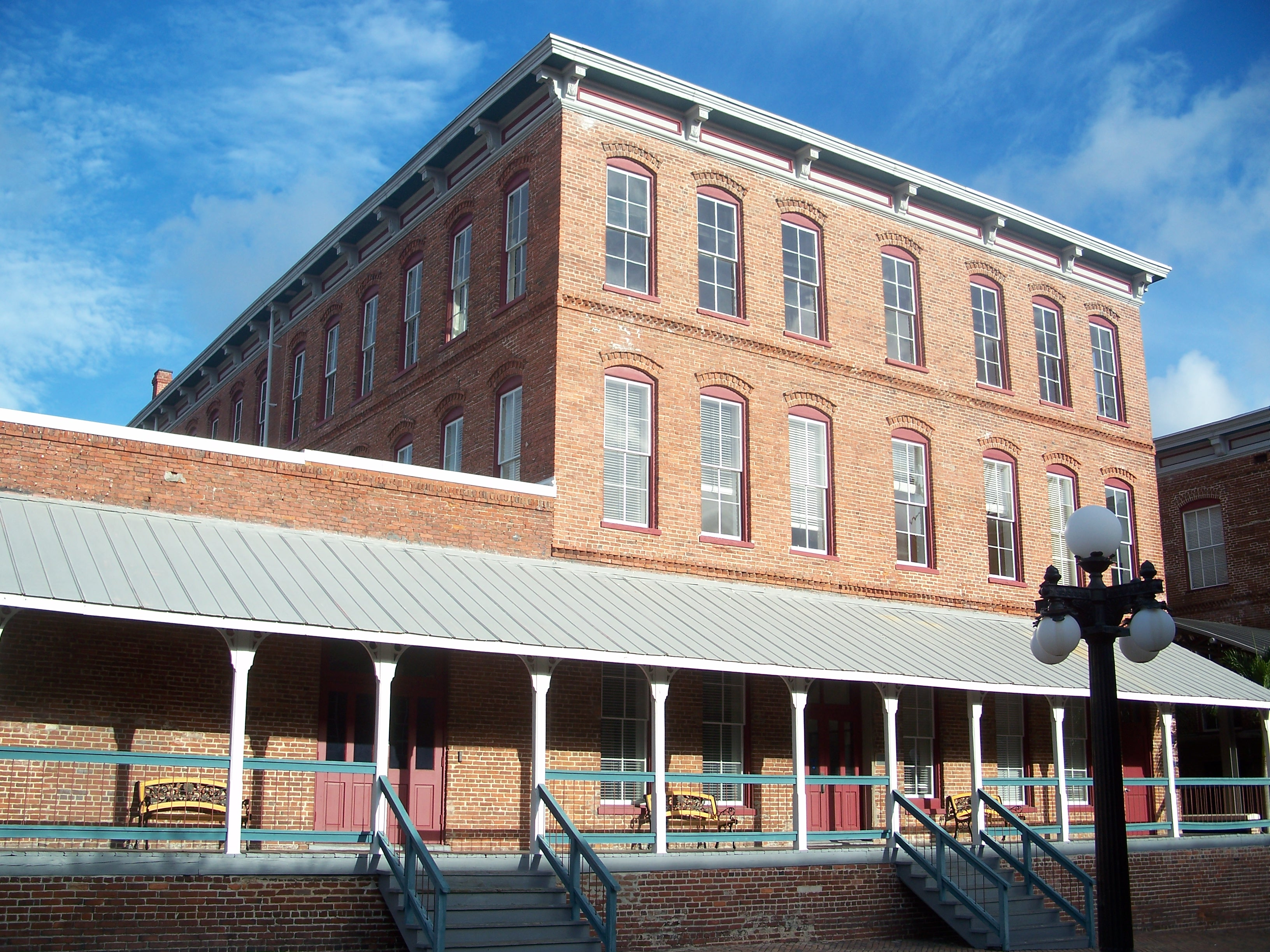
Ybor Factory Building side

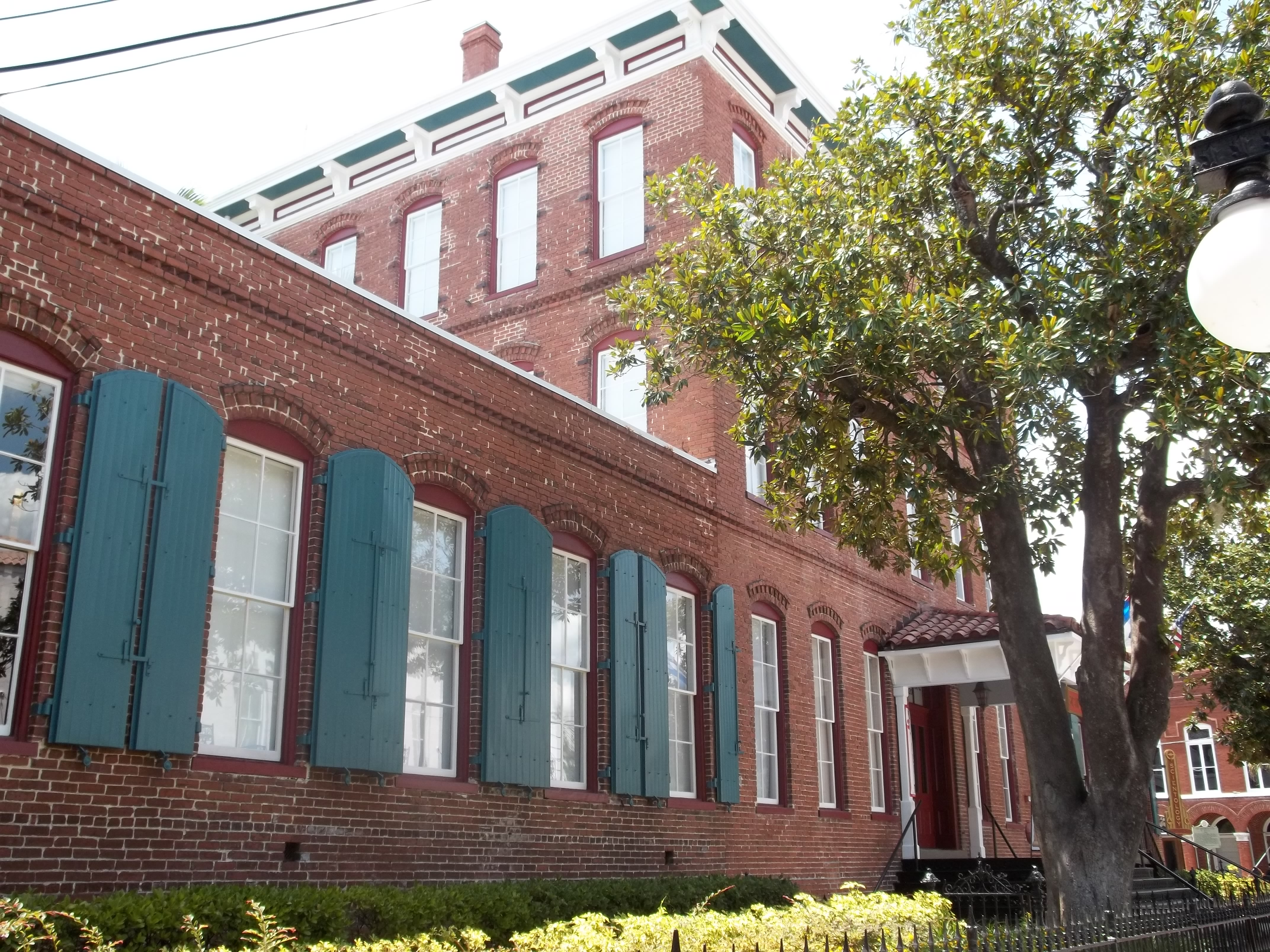
Ybor Factory Building side

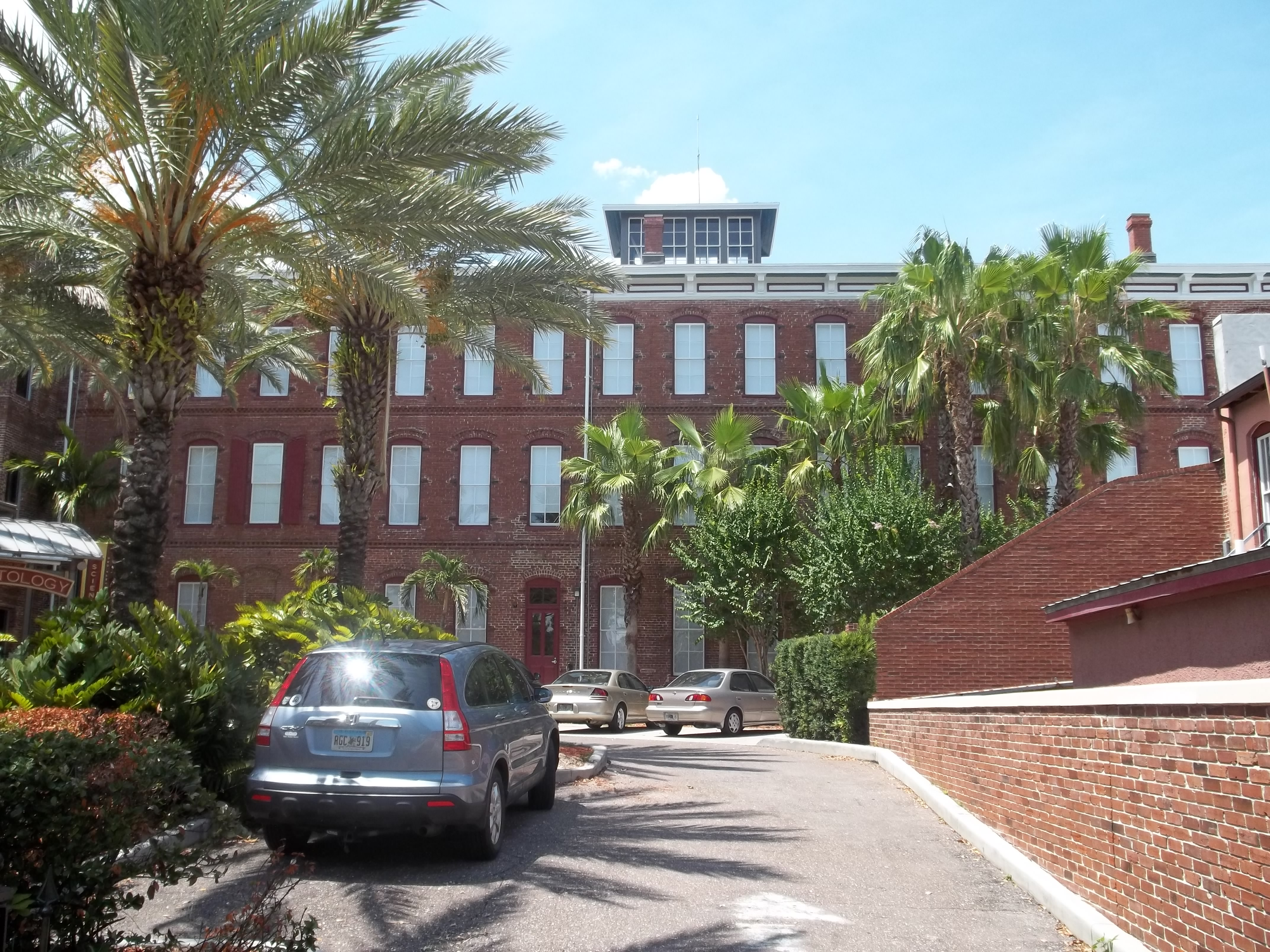
Ybor Factory Building front

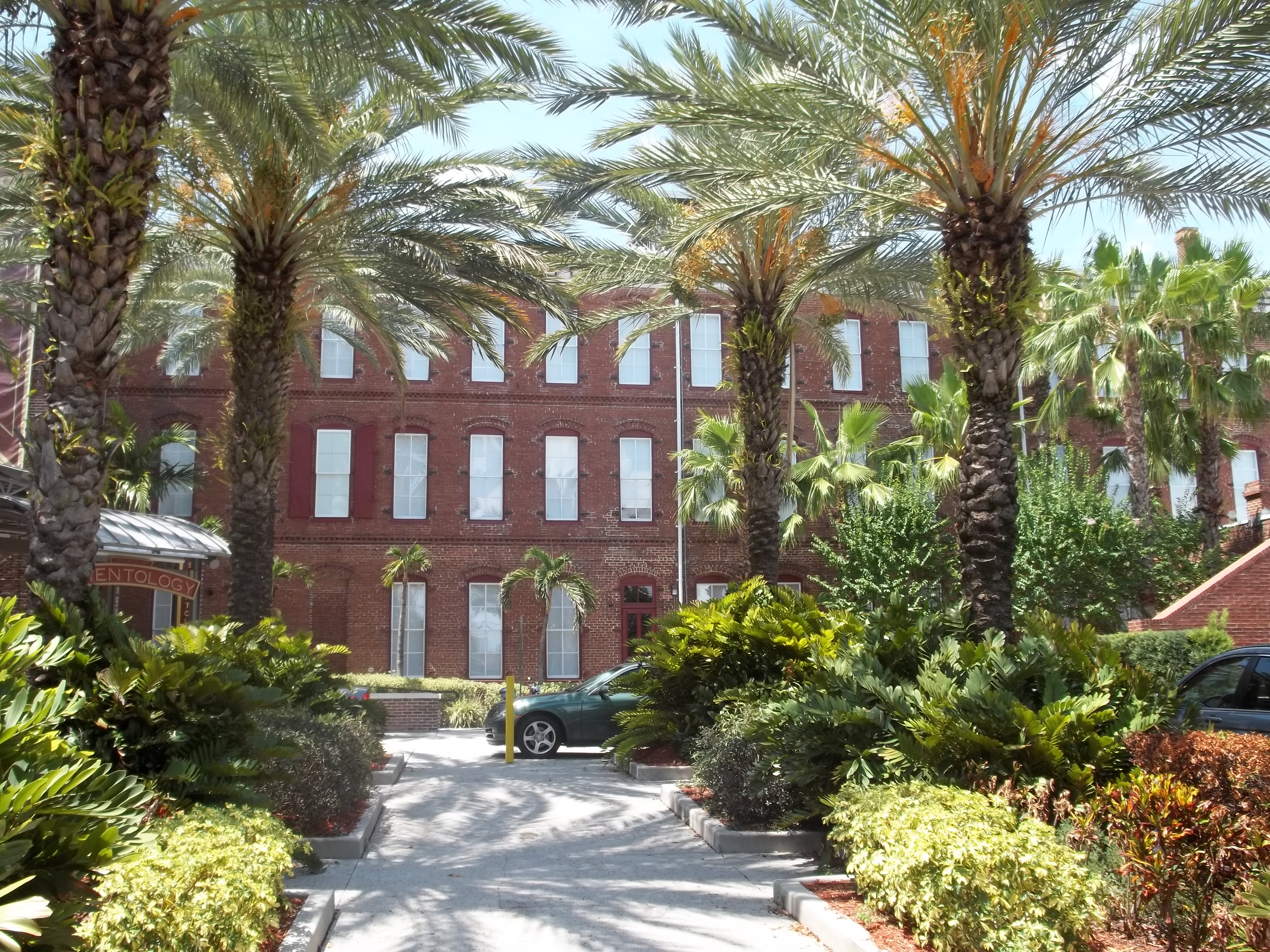
Ybor Factory Building front
