= The Parcel =

- Theatrical release poster
- Directed by: Indrasis Acharya
- Written by: Indrasis Acharya
- Produced by: Rituparna Sengupta; Krishna Kyal
- Starring: Rituparna Sengupta; Saswata Chatterjee
- Cinematography: Santanu Dey
- Edited by: Moloy Laha
- Music by: Joy Sarkar
- Release dates: 10 November 2019 (Kolkata); 13 March 2020
- Running time: 124 minutes
- Country: India
- Language: Bengali

The Parcel is a 2020 Indian Bengali-language mystery cum psychological thriller film directed by Indrasis Acharya, produced by Rituparna Sengupta and Krishna Kyal. The film features Rituparna Sengupta, Saswata Chatterjee, Anindya Chatterjee and Ambarish Bhattacharya in lead roles and Sreela Majumdar and Pradip Mukherjee as supporting characters. The story of the film revolves around a doctor-couple and Nandini, the protagonist, and mysterious parcels.

Acharya, the director of the film, won the Best Director award (Hiralal Sen Memorial) at the 25th Kolkata International Film Festival for the film. The film was theatrically released on 13 March 2020.

== Plot ==
The film begins with a couple, Nandini and Souvik, both doctors, and their teenaged daughter leading an uneventful life until it is abruptly disrupted. Nandini receives a parcel one morning from an anonymous person. She feels that someone from her past might be blackmailing her. This leads to an exploration of her psychoses. The couple fall into a trap that raises questions about their careers, reveals extramarital affairs, and upends regular life as they knew it. Nandini's past haunts her present, creating a major disruption of balance in her narrative.

== Cast ==
- Rituparna Sengupta as Nandini
- Saswata Chatterjee as Souvik
- Anindya Chatterjee
- Ambarish Bhattacharya
- Sreela Majumdar
- Pradip Mukherjee
- Daminee Basu
- Juin Bagchi

== Production ==
The film is produced by Rituparna Sengupta and Krishna Kyal.

== Promotion and release ==
The official trailer of the film was unveiled by Acharya on 11 February 2020.

The film was theatrically released on 13 March 2020.

== Soundtrack ==
The music of the film is composed by Joy Sarkar.

#	Title	Singer(s)
1	"Amaar Raat Pohalo"	Sreela Mazumder
2	"Brindabono Rai Bilasi"	Rituparna Sengupta

== Awards ==
- The Parcel has received two festival laurels – the 14th Jogja NETPAC Asian film festival in Indonesia and the Diorama international film festival in Delhi.
- Indrasis Acharya won the Best Director award (Hiralal Sen Memorial) at the 25th Kolkata International Film Festival for the film The Parcel.
