= Bilu Rakkhosh =

2017 Bengali film

Bilu Rakkhosh : Bilu A Demon Within
- Poster
- Directed by: Indrasis Acharya
- Written by: Indrasis Acharya
- Produced by: Amit Debnath; Anirban Maity
- Starring: joy Sengupta; Koneenica Banerjee; Kanchana Moitra
- Cinematography: Santanu Dey
- Edited by: Moloy Laha
- Music by: Joy Sarkar
- Release date: 1 September 2017
- Country: India
- Language: Bengali

Bilu Rakkhosh: A Demon Within is a 2017 Indian Bengali-language drama film by debutant director Indrasis Acharya. The story is a journey of a modern IT executive who has an inclination towards music. It's a story of different psychological situations through a man's mundane daily life and how he loses his soul. The music is released by Amara Muzik.

== Plot ==
The film delineates the journey of a bright mind which is tormented by contradiction in the scenario of rapid socio technical age. He has a lucrative yet anxiety ridden vocation which does not allow him to nurture his long cherished dream to be a singer. His life is squandered as he is unable to settle equilibrium between family obligation and personal ambition. He is like the desperate sailor whose ship is on the verge of sinking. In his mind he creates a utopia and oscillates between past and present helplessly to capture an ideal locale. The film offers an open ending for the viewers to find out the demon's lot.

== Cast ==
- Joy Sengupta as Bilu
- Koneenica Banerjee as Sohini
- Kanchana Moitra as Ranu
- Rony Dasgupta as Priyadip
- Pradip Mukherjee as Father of Bilu
- Moumita Mitra as Mala
- Arijit Chackrabarty as Arijit
- Deboprasad Halder as Deb
- Anirban Banerjee as Chiranjib as Friend of Bilu
- Rajanya Laha as Childhood of Bilu
- Papiya Sen

== Production ==
Produced by Amit Debnath and Anirban Maity and presented by Tripod Entertainment in association with Aalekh.

== Soundtrack ==
The music of the film is composed by Joy Sarkar.

#	Title	Singer(s)
1	"Sajani Sajani Tagore Song"	Jayati Chakraborty Momomay Bhattacharya, Srabani Roy
2	"Bilu Theme Music"	Joy Sarkar
3	"Nid nahi ankhi patey by Atul Prasad Sen"	Jayati Chakraborty
4	"Bhangilo rey sukho mela"	Srabani Roy

== Reception ==
Panos Kotzathanasis of Asian Movie Pulse wrote, "Bilu Rakkhosh is a very sad film about a very sad man, but Acharya handles his main theme with an artistry that results in a movie that is quite captivating, at least for the most part".
