= Timeline of Norfolk, Virginia =

The following is a timeline of the history of the city of Norfolk, Virginia, United States.

== Prior to 19th century ==
- 1682 - Norfolk Town founded.
- 1728 - Norfolk Academy chartered.
- 1736 - Town of Norfolk attains borough status.
- 1739 - Saint Paul's Episcopal Church built.
- 1760 (approximately) - Poplar Hall, a historic plantation house, is built.
- 1767 - Gosport Shipyard established near Norfolk.
- 1776 - January 1: Burning of Norfolk.
- 1790 - Population: 2,959.
- 1795 - Fort Norfolk built.
- 1799 - Fire.

== 19th century ==
- 1804 - Female Orphan Society founded.
- 1812 - War of 1812 begins; ends 1815.
- 1819 - First U.S. Customs House built on waterfront; relocated to permanent building on Main Street in 1852.
- 1828 - Christ Church built.
- 1840 - Population: 10,920.
- 1845 - Norfolk attains city status.
- 1848 - Norfolk Humane Association active.
- 1850
  - Norfolk Courthouse built.
  - Freemason Street Baptist Church dedicated.
- 1852 - Permanent U.S. Custom House opens at Main & Granby Street
- 1853 - "Negro free school" and Elmwood Cemetery established.
- 1854 - Saint Mary's Catholic Cemetery established.
- 1855
  - Yellow fever outbreak; over 3,000 people die.
  - Hospital of St. Vincent de Paul is founded in response to the yellow fever epidemic. It is Norfolk's first civilian and public hospital. It would evolve into what is now Bon Secours DePaul Medical Center.
- 1858
  - Norfolk and Petersburg Railroad laid out.
  - Basilica of Saint Mary built.
- 1861
  - (April) Civil War begins.
  - (May) Battle of Sewell's Point
- 1862 - May 10: Union forces in power.
- 1865
  - Colored Monitor Union Club formed.
  - Civil War ends.
- 1870 - Norfolk Library Association founded.
- 1873 - West Point Cemetery established.
- 1875 - Masonic Temple built.
- 1877 - Norfolk and Portsmouth Cotton Exchange incorporated.
- 1880
  - Population: 21,966.
  - Norfolk College for Young Ladies, a finishing school, opens Downtown and operates until about 1899.
- 1885 - Hofheimer's, a Norfolk-based retailer of upscale footwear, is founded. The company thrives for many decades before closing in 1998.
- 1887 - Brambleton becomes part of Norfolk.
- 1888
  - St. John's African Methodist Episcopal Church built.
  - Norfolk Retreat for the Sick opens; it would later evolve into Norfolk General Hospital.
- 1890
  - Atlantic City becomes part of Norfolk.
  - Population: 34,871.
- 1894 - Norfolk Daily Pilot newspaper begins publication; it evolved into the present-day Virginian-Pilot.
- 1896
  - Epworth United Methodist Church opens.
  - Norfolk and Portsmouth Belt Line Railroad begins.
- 1898 - The first Monticello Hotel building opens.
- 1899 or soon thereafter - the college that would later evolve into University of Mary Washington took over the former finishing school building previously occupied by Norfolk College for Young Ladies.

== 20th century ==
=== 1900s ===
- 1900
  - Population: 46,624.
  - Norfolk Zoo opens.
  - U.S. Post Office and Courts Building constructed.
- 1901 - Norfolk Journal and Guide newspaper in publication.
- 1902 - Park Place becomes part of Norfolk.
- 1903 - The original Sarah Leigh Hospital opens on Mowbray Arch along the Hague in Ghent. It would evolve into today's Sentara Leigh Hospital.
- 1904
  - Freemason Street Library opens.
  - Chesterfield Heights district is platted; development is primarily from 1915 to 1950
- 1906 - Barkley becomes part of Norfolk.
- 1907
  - Jamestown Exposition held.
  - Confederate monument erected.
  - Monticello Arcade built.
  - Doumar's opens in Norfolk
  - Virginian Railway started.

=== 1910s ===
- 1910
  - Christ and St. Luke's Church built.
  - Population: 67,452.
- 1911
  - Huntersville and Lambert's Point become part of Norfolk.
  - Maury and Booker T. Washington High Schools open.
- 1912 - Norfolk Terminal Station, a railway station, opens in Downtown Norfolk.
- 1913 - Wells Theatre opens as a vaudeville and movie house.
- 1917
  - U.S. Naval Station Norfolk opens on Sewell's Point peninsula
  - A local NAACP branch is established.
- 1918
  - Southern Bagging Company building constructed.
  - The Monticello Hotel destroyed by fire; it is rebuilt on the same site and reopens in 1919.
- 1919
  - City-manager form of government adopted.
  - Attucks Theatre, popular with African-American audiences, opens and becomes known as the "Apollo Theatre of the South".

=== 1920s ===
- 1920 – Population: 115,777.
- 1921 - Virginia Beach Boulevard opens, providing easier access to the oceanfront.
- 1922
  - U.S. Marine Hospital built.
  - NorVa Theatre opens as a vaudeville house and movie theater.
  - Norview High School opens.
- 1923
  - Algonquin Park, Cottage Park, Edgewater, Kenilworth, Lafayette Annex, Lakewood, Larchmont, Lenox, Morning Side, Norfolk Naval Base, Ocean View (part), and Willoughby become part of city.
  - WTAR radio begins broadcasting.
- 1926 - The Loews Theater opens as a vaudeville and movie palace at 300 Granby Street and continues operating as a cinema for many decades. As of 2018, the venue is the TCC Roper Center for the Performing Arts.
- 1928 - The Nansemond Hotel opens in Ocean View and enjoys many decades as a popular tourist attraction; it was destroyed by fire in 1980.

=== 1930s ===
- 1930
  - Population: 129,710
  - Norfolk Division of College of William & Mary is established. It would later evolve into Old Dominion College and later University.
- 1932 - U.S. Post Office and Courthouse built.
- 1933 - Norfolk Museum of Arts and Sciences opens.
- 1935 - Norfolk Unit of Virginia State University opens. In 1969, it became Norfolk State College and a university in 1979.
- 1936 - Foreman Field, a multi-purpose stadium, opens at Old Dominion University.
- 1938 - Norfolk Municipal Airport and Norfolk Azalea Garden open.
- 1939 - Granby High School opens.

=== 1940s ===
- 1940 - Norfolk Redevelopment & Housing Authority created.
- 1941 - Merrimack Park dedicated.
- 1943
  - Norfolk Municipal Auditorium opens.
  - Norfolk Center Theater opens.
- 1947 - Ward's Corner Shopping Center opens at the intersection of Granby and Little Creek Roads. Over time, future retailers included Hofheimer's shoes ('52), a Giant Open Air supermarket ('63), and the first 24-hour pharmacy in Norfolk, a People's Drug Store. It also had two locations of department store chains, Rices Nachmans ('52) and Smith & Welton.
- 1948 - Wilders Drive-In cinema in business.

=== 1950s ===
- 1950 - WTAR-TV (television) begins broadcasting.
- 1952
  - NATO Supreme Allied Commander Atlantic headquartered in Norfolk.
  - Norfolk–Portsmouth Bridge–Tunnel opens.
  - WRAP-AM radio begins broadcasting.
- 1953 - WTOV-TV (television) begins broadcasting; it later evolved into WGNT.
- 1954 - Azalea Festival begins.
- 1955 - Tanners Creek becomes part of city.
- 1957 - Hampton Roads Bridge–Tunnel opens, connecting Norfolk with the Virginia Peninsula.
- 1958 - Sister city program established with Moji, Japan.
- 1959
  - Azalea Gardens, East Ocean View, JANAF, Little Creek, and Military Highway become part of City, annexed variously from former Norfolk and Princess Anne Counties.
  - February: School desegregation begins.
  - JANAF shopping center opens at the northeast corner of Military Highway and Virginia Beach Blvd.

=== 1960s ===
- 1961
  - Children's Hospital of The King's Daughters opens.
  - The Golden Triangle Motor Hotel, the first major hotel to open in Norfolk since 1906, opens at 700 Monticello Ave., at a cost of $6.9 million. Located near Scope Arena, the hotel changes ownership over the years. During the 1980s, it was known as "Holiday Inn Scope". As of 2018, it is Wyndham Garden Norfolk Downtown.
- 1962
  - Midtown Tunnel begins operating.
  - Norfolk Terminal Train Station closes; it is demolished in 1963.
- 1965–Present day Norfolk City Hall facilities open.
- 1966 - Virginia Wesleyan College opens; it becomes a university in 2017.
- 1967
  - Virginia Beach-Norfolk Expressway opens, roughly following the same route as Virginia Beach Blvd. It greatly facilitates access from Norfolk to the oceanfront.
  - Virginia National Bank building completed at One Commercial Place, Downtown. It would later become Bank of America and in 2017, Icon Norfolk apartments.
  - Lake Taylor High School opens.
- 1969
  - Norfolk State College becomes independent from Petersburg's Virginia State College. In 1979, it becomes a university.
  - Econo-Travel motel, the first in the United States, opens for business on N. Military Highway. As of 2018, it is still operating.

=== 1970s ===
- 1970 - Military Circle Mall opens at the southeast corner of the intersection of Military Highway and Virginia Beach Blvd.
- 1971 - Norfolk Scope conventional hall opens.
- 1972 - Chrysler Hall opened.
- 1974 - Virginia Opera formed.
- 1976
  - The Monticello Hotel demolished.
  - Omni Hotel opens in Downtown Norfolk; as of 2018, the 10-story hotel is occupied by Sheraton Waterside.
  - Hampton Roads Bridge-Tunnel doubles its capacity through significant expansion, creating separate tubes for east- and west-bound traffic from Norfolk to the Virginia Peninsula.
  - The first Harborfest is held in celebration of America's Bicentennial. The festival is a success and becomes an annual event.
- 1977 - Leigh Memorial Hospital moves to its current location on Kempsville Rd.
- 1978 - (Labor Day) Ocean View Amusement Park permanently closes. The rollercoaster, built in 1927, is demolished in '79 for the TV movie Death of Ocean View Park, telecast later that year.
- 1979 - Hampton Roads Naval Museum is established.

=== 1980s ===
- 1980
  - Virginia Stage Company opens in the recently renovated Wells Theater.
  - NorVa Theater is remodeled as the Downtown Athletic Club.
- 1981 - Elizabeth Jordan Carr, the first United States baby conceived by in vitro fertilization, is born at Norfolk General Hospital.
- 1983
  - Waterside festival marketplace opens Downtown.
  - Norfolk's World Trade Center building is completed and opens; it is an 11-story building at 101 West Main St.
- 1987 - Dominion Tower built.
- 1989
  - Norfolk Southern Tower built.
  - Dominion Enterprises opens

=== 1990s ===
- 1990 - Population: 261,229.
- 1991 - Norfolk Waterside Marriott Hotel opens in Downtown Norfolk.
- 1993
  - Harbor Park stadium opens.
  - Bobby Scott becomes U.S. representative for Virginia's 3rd congressional district.
- 1994
  - Paul Fraim becomes mayor.
  - Nauticus, The National Maritime Center museum, opens in Downtown Norfolk.
- 1996
  - City website online (approximate date).
  - PRA Group opens
- 1998 - Armed Forces Memorial dedicated.
- 1999 - MacArthur Center Shopping Mall opens in Downtown Norfolk.

== 21st century ==
=== 2000s ===
- 2000
  - Cinemark 18 multiplex opens at Military Circle Mall.
  - The NorVa, after 18 years of use as the Downtown Athletic Club, finishes renovation and reopens as a successful music and concert venue.
- 2001 - USS Wisconsin opens as a museum ship on the waterfront in Downtown Norfolk. Managed by Hampton Roads Naval Museum, it is berthed next to Nauticus, The National Maritime Center.
- 2002 - 150 West Main Street, a 20-story office building, opens Downtown.
- 2003 - NATO Allied Command Transformation headquartered in Norfolk.
- 2006 - Sentara Heart Hospital opens. Adjoining Sentara Norfolk General Hospital, it is Southeastern Virginia's only dedicated heart hospital.

=== 2010s ===
- 2010 - Population: 242,803 in city; 1,676,822 in Virginia Beach-Norfolk-Newport News, VA-NC Metropolitan Statistical Area.
- 2011 - Tide Light Rail system begins; Monticello and NSU stations open.
- 2015 - USA Discounters files for Chapter 11 bankruptcy.
- 2017
  - Bank of America Downtown Norfolk tower completes renovation and reopens as Icon Norfolk luxury apartments
  - Norfolk Premium Outlets mall opens.
  - Hilton Norfolk the Main opens.
- 2018 - Norfolk Southern announces relocating HQ to Atlanta

=== 2020s ===
- 2026 - Bert Atienza died from injuries sustained at a Norfolk Walmart.

== See also ==
- History of Norfolk, Virginia
- List of mayors of Norfolk, Virginia
- National Register of Historic Places listings in Norfolk, Virginia
- History of Hampton Roads area
- Timelines of other cities in Virginia: Alexandria, Hampton, Lynchburg, Newport News, Portsmouth, Richmond, Roanoke, Virginia Beach

== Bibliography ==
Published in 19th c.

- Forest, ed. (1851). Norfolk Directory – via Norfolk Public Library.
- William S. Forrest (1853). Historical and Descriptive Sketches of Norfolk and Vicinity. Philadelphia: Lindsay and Blakiston.
- H. W. Burton (1877), History of Norfolk, Virginia, Norfolk Virginian, OL 24588459M
- Robert W. Lamb, ed. (1888). Our Twin Cities of the Nineteenth Century (Norfolk and Portsmouth). Barcroft.
- Norfolk; the Marine Metropolis of Virginia. Norfolk, Va.: Geo. I. Nowitzky. 1888.

Published in 20th c.

- Ordinances of the City of Norfolk, Va. Norfolk: Burke & Gregory. 1902. (+ 1894 ed.)
- Information about Norfolk, Portsmouth, Berkley, Virginia and Vicinity. Norfolk: Board of Trade. 1905.
- Illustrated Standard Guide to Norfolk and Portsmouth, Norfolk, Va: Standard Lithographing and Publishing Co., 1907, OL 24365413M
- "Norfolk (Virginia)" . Encyclopædia Britannica. Vol. 19 (11th ed.). 1910. p. 747.
- Hill's Norfolk and Portsmouth (Virginia) City Directory. 1931 – via Norfolk Public Library.
- Thomas J. Wertenbaker. Norfolk, Historic Southern Port (Durham NC, 1931).
- Federal Writers' Project (1941), "Norfolk", Virginia: a Guide to the Old Dominion, American Guide Series, Oxford University Press, OL 24223083M
- Lenoir Chambers (1965). "Notes on Life in Occupied Norfolk, 1862-1865". Virginia Magazine of History and Biography. 73 (2): 131–144. JSTOR 4247102.
- Michael Hucles (1992). "Many Voices, Similar Concerns: Traditional Methods of African-American Political Activity in Norfolk, Virginia, 1865-1875". Virginia Magazine of History and Biography. 100 (4): 543–566. JSTOR 4249313.
- Thomas C. Parramore (1994). Norfolk: The First Four Centuries. University of Virginia Press. ISBN 978-0-8139-1988-1.
- Antonio T. Bly (1998). "Thunder during the Storm-School Desegregation in Norfolk, Virginia, 1957-1959: A Local History". Journal of Negro Education. 67 (2): 106–114. doi:10.2307/2668221. JSTOR 2668221.
- Ruth A. Rose (2000). Norfolk, Virginia. Black America. Charleston, South Carolina: Arcadia.

Published in 21st c.

- John G. Deal (2011). "Middle-Class Benevolent Societies in Antebellum Norfolk, Virginia". In Jonathan Daniel Wells; Jennifer R. Green (eds.). The Southern Middle Class in the Long Nineteenth Century. Louisiana State University Press. pp. 84–104. ISBN 978-0-8071-3851-9.
