= History of Norfolk, Virginia =

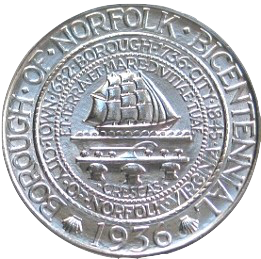
Obverse

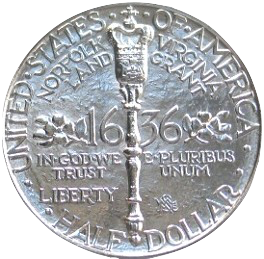
Reverse

Norfolk Bicentennial half-dollar (1936)

The City of Norfolk was established in 1682. The city was named after the English county of Norfolk and was formally incorporated as a borough in 1736. The city was burned by orders of the outgoing Virginia governor Lord Dunmore in 1776 during the second year of the American Revolutionary War (1775–1783), although it was soon rebuilt.

The 19th century proved to be a time of numerous travails for both the city of Norfolk, and the region as whole. War, epidemics, fires, and economic depression reduced the development of the city. The city grew into the region's economic hub. By the late 19th century, the Norfolk and Western Railway with its line to the west established the community as a major coal ore exporting port and built a large trans-loading facility at Lambert's Point. It became the terminus for numerous other railroads, linking its ports to inland regions of Virginia and North Carolina, and at the turn of the 20th century, the coal mining regions of Appalachia were well connected to the port on the East Coast. Princess Anne and Norfolk counties would become leaders in truck farming, producing over half of all greens and potatoes consumed on the East Coast. Lynnhaven oysters also became a major export.

The region's African Americans achieved full emancipation following the Civil War (1861–1865), after the initial Emancipation Proclamation by 16th President Abraham Lincoln in 1862–1863, supplemented later by the three post-war constitutional amendments during the Reconstruction era (1865–1877), only to be faced with severe discrimination through white legislators' later imposition by the 1890s of Jim Crow Laws. After Virginia passed a new post-war state constitution, African Americans were essentially disfranchised for more than 60 years until their leadership and activism won passage of federal civil rights legislation in the mid-1960s. In 1907, it was host to the Jamestown Exposition commemorating the tercennary (300th anniversary) of the first English settlement at Jamestown on the James River, the only world's fair to ever be held in Virginia. As a result of its publicity and visits by high-ranking officials during the exposition (in which the Great White Fleet, of 26th President Theodore Roosevelt with the rebuilt United States Navy after the Spanish–American War of 1898 was launched from Hampton Roads harbor), it became the later location of the Norfolk Naval Station.

Today, the city of Norfolk is a major American naval and world shipping hub, as well as the center of the Hampton Roads region, both on the southside and the peninsula to the north of the extensive harbor between the James and York Rivers, with the railroad terminus and ship construction port of Newport News from the 19th century on the west shore and Hampton on the south and east sides, dating back to its founding in the colonial era as Virginia's original port.

== Pre-colonial ==
The first evidence of humans inhabiting Virginia is from 9,500 BC.

In 1584, Sir Walter Raleigh led an expedition in search of a suitable place to establish a permanent English settlement in North America. By mid-July of that year, two of his ships had landed on Roanoke Island (now a part of Dare County). Arthur Barlowe, one of Raleigh's commanders, kept a journal which states the area was inhabited by a tribe of Native Americans called the Chesepian. According to Barlowe, the local Chesepians claimed that a nearby city called Skicoak was the Chesepians' greatest city. However, the exact location of Skicoak has remained undetermined.

When Jamestown settlers arrived at Cape Henry (in present-day Virginia Beach) almost 23 years later in April 1607, they found no traces of Skicoak. According to William Strachey's The Historie of Travaile into Virginia Britanica (1612), the Chesepians had been wiped out by Chief Wahunsunacock (better known as Chief Powhatan), the head of the Virginia Peninsula-based Powhatan Confederacy in the intervening years.

== Colonial period (1607–1775) ==
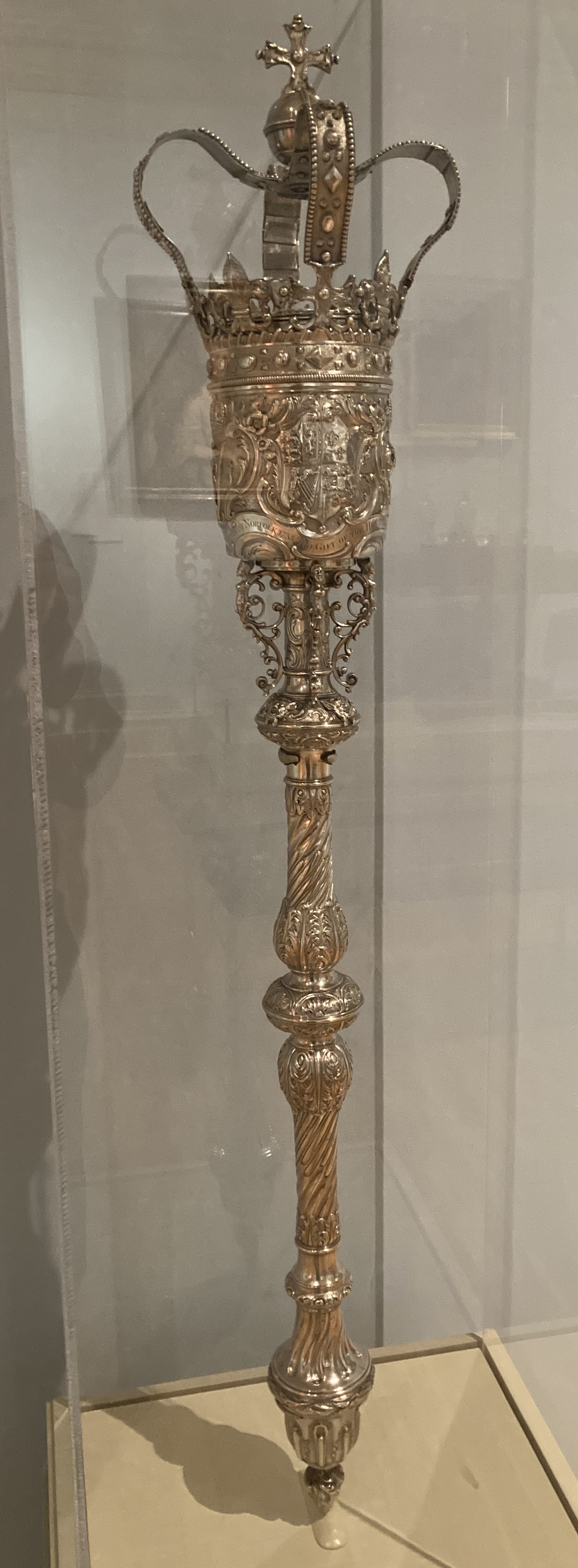
Mace of Norfolk, Virginia presented in 1754

In 1607, the Governor for the Virginia Colony, Sir George Yeardley established four incorporations, termed "citties" [sic] for the developed portion of the colony. These citties were to form the basis for the government of the colony in the newly created House of Burgesses, with the southeastern portion of the Hampton Roads region falling under the Elizabeth Cittie [sic] incorporation. In 1622, Adam Thoroughgood (1604–1640) of King's Lynn, Norfolk, England, became one of the earliest Englishmen to settle in the area that was to become South Hampton Roads, when at the age of 18 he became an indentured servant to pay for passage to the Virginia Colony. After his period of contracted servitude was finished, he earned his freedom and soon became a leading citizen of the fledgling colony.

Meanwhile, after years of continuing struggles at Jamestown, the now bankrupt Virginia Company had its royal charter revoked by King James I in 1624 and Virginia became a crown colony. Also at this time, the King granted 500 acres (2.0 km^{2}) of land to Thomas Willoughby, in what is now the Ocean View section of the city. The entire population of the Virginia colony was estimated to be 5,000 people at this time.

In 1629, Thoroughgood was elected to the House of Burgesses for Elizabeth Cittie. Five years later, in 1634, the King had the colony reorganized under a system of 8 shires, with much of the Hampton Roads region becoming part of Elizabeth City Shire. In 1636, Thoroughgood was granted a large land holding along the Lynnhaven River for having persuaded 105 people to settle in the colony. Thoroughgood is also credited with suggesting the name of Norfolk, in honor of his birthplace. New Norfolk County was created when the South Hampton Roads portion of Elizabeth City Shire was partitioned off in that same year. Also during this reorganization, King James granted a further 200 acres (0.81 km^{2}) to Willoughby. This land would become the city of Norfolk in future. Shortly thereafter, in 1637, New Norfolk County was itself split into two counties, Upper Norfolk County and Lower Norfolk County. The modern city of Norfolk is located in Lower Norfolk.

In 1649 the English couple William and Susannah Moseley migrated with their family to Lower Norfolk County. On the Eastern Branch Elizabeth River 5 miles (8.0 km) from Norfolk, they built a manor house with Dutch-style gambrel roof which later became known as Rolleston Hall. Rolleston Hall stood more than 200 years, until it burned down in the late 19th century.

In 1670, a royal decree directed the "building of storehouses to receive imported merchandise ... and tobacco for export" for each of the colony's 20 counties. This marked the beginning of Norfolk's importance as a port city, due to its natural deepwater channels. Soon after 1673, the "Half Moone" fort at the site of what is now Town Pointe Park. This fort was constructed due to feared attack by the Dutch, but this threat did not materialize. Norfolk quickly grew in size, and by 1682 a charter for the establishment of the "Towne of Lower Norfolk County" had been issued by Parliament. Norfolk was one of only three cities in the Virginia Colony to receive a royal charter, the other two being Jamestown and Williamsburg. The town initially encompassed a land area northeast of the point of the confluence of the Eastern and Southern Branches of the Elizabeth River (today the point is in downtown). In 1691, a final county subdivision took place when Lower Norfolk County was split to form Norfolk County (present day Norfolk, Chesapeake, and parts of Portsmouth) and Princess Anne County (present day Virginia Beach). Norfolk was incorporated in 1705 and re-chartered as a borough in 1736.

In 1753, Lt. Governor Robert Dinwiddie presented the growing city of 4,000 with a 41-inch (1,000 mm) long, 104 ounce silver mace. The mace was a symbol of royal authority and is currently displayed in the Chrysler Museum of Art.

By 1775, Norfolk had developed into one of the most prosperous cities in Virginia. It was a major shipbuilding center and an important trans-shipment point for the export of goods such as tobacco, corn, cotton, and timber from Virginia and North Carolina, to Europe and beyond. In turn, goods from the West Indies such as rum and sugar, and finished manufactured products from Europe, were imported back through Norfolk and shipped to the rest of the lower colonies. Much of the West Indies and American colonial products that flowed through the harbor were by this time produced with the use of slave labor.

== Revolutionary War (1775–1783) ==
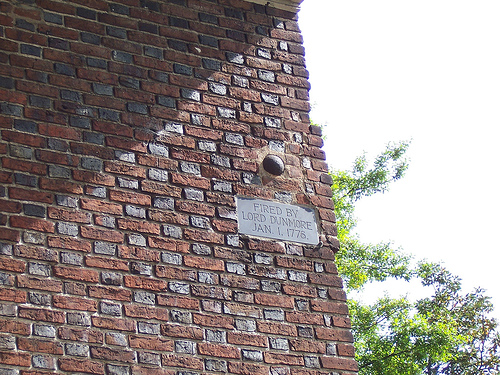
Cannonball in the wall of Saint Paul's Episcopal Church

Norfolk had been a strong base of Loyalist support throughout the start of the American Revolution. In the early summer of 1775, Lord Dunmore, the last Royal Governor of the Colony of Virginia, tried to reestablish control of the colony from Norfolk. In November, a battle took place at Kemp's Landing which provided Dunmore and the loyalists a clear victory, but it was nonetheless clear by then that the war was escalating. The governor immediately issued Dunmore's Proclamation, which promised freedom to any rebel-owned slave who joined His Majesty's forces. At the end of November, Dunmore set up a stronghold in Norfolk, demolishing some 30 houses in the course of its construction. A few days later, based on false intelligence received, Dunmore's 600 soldiers were defeated in the Battle of Great Bridge, where 102 of Dunmore's soldiers were killed or injured, compared with just one injured soldier for the patriots. Dunmore and their loyalists fled Norfolk and boarded their ship, thus ending 168 years of British rule in Virginia.

Dunmore remained in the river off Norfolk with a small squadron of armed ships and on New Year's Day 1776, Lord Dunmore's ships began a bombardment that escalated into the Burning of Norfolk. British troops also went ashore to burn the waterfront buildings, and thus played right into the hands of their enemies. The rebels were quite happy to see a largely Loyalist city destroyed, happier still to be able to blame it on the British, and over the next two days they encouraged the spread of fires, while looting unburned houses. The Virginia Assembly found that of the 882 houses burned during those two days, only 19 had been set alight by the British. A further 416—in effect, all that remained standing—were destroyed in February 1776 to prevent the British from using them as cover if they returned. Only Saint Paul's Episcopal Church survived the bombardment and subsequent fires, however the church was dented by a cannonball fired by HMS Liverpool.

== Antebellum: rebirth, fire, and disease (1783–1861) ==
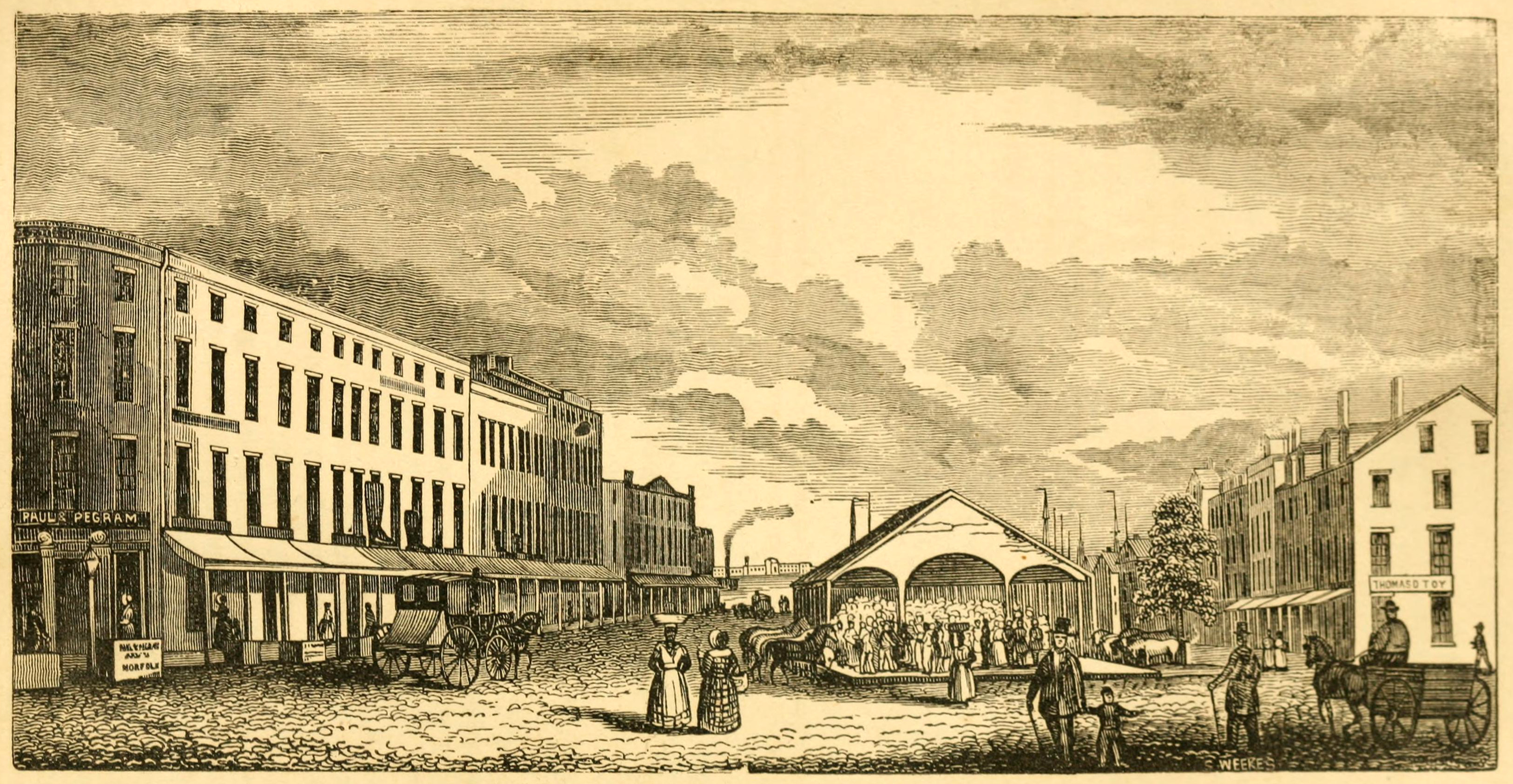
Market Square in Norfolk c. 1845

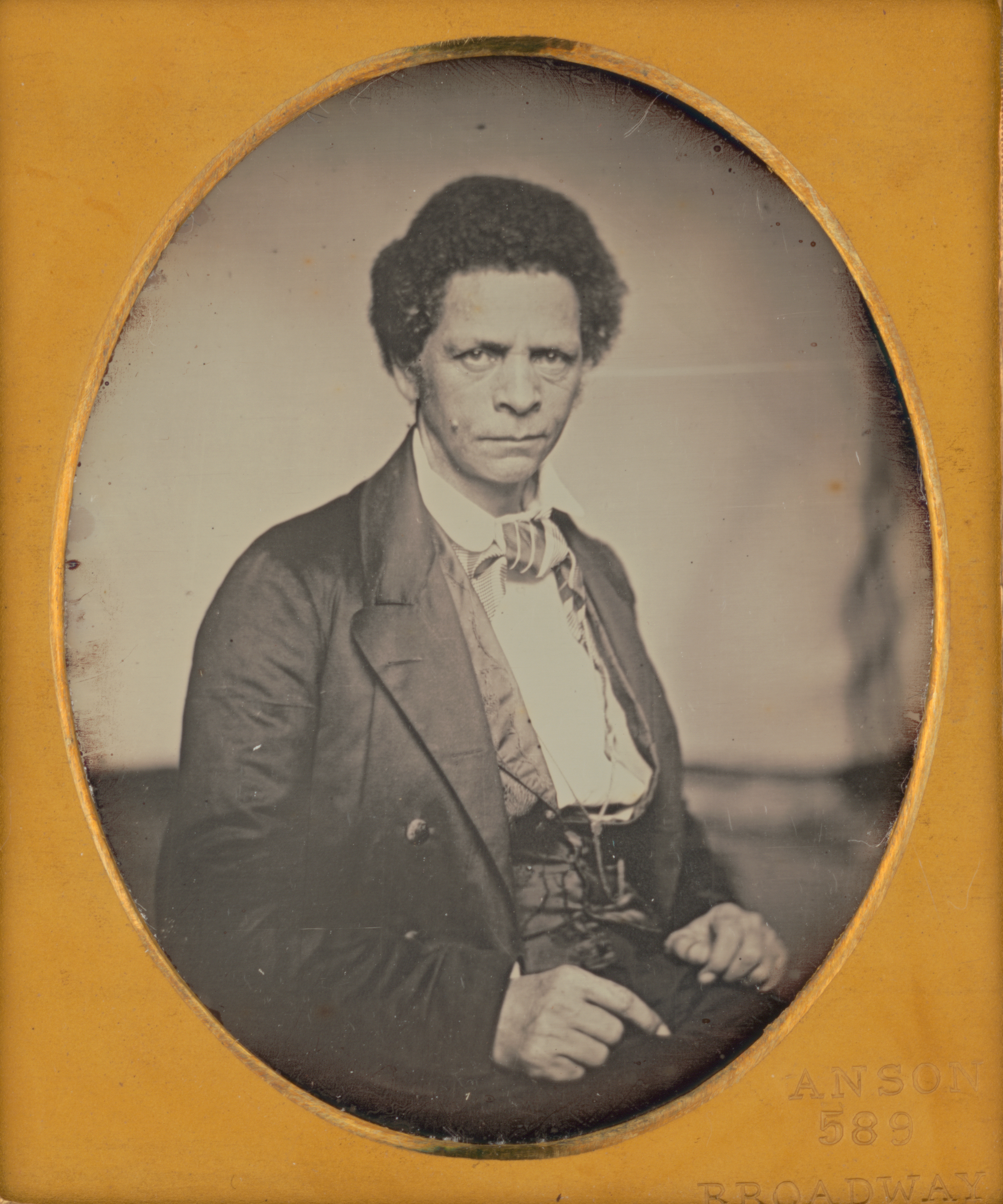
Joseph Jenkins Roberts, born and raised in Norfolk; first President of Liberia

Four years after the Revolutionary War, a fire along the city's waterfront destroyed some 300 buildings and the city experienced a serious economic setback as a result. At the turn of the 19th century, Fort Norfolk was constructed by the Federal government to guard the harbor.

During the 1820s the agricultural communities of South Hampton Roads experienced a prolonged recession, resulting in the emigration of families from the region to other areas of the South, especially the frontier areas being opened for settlement. From 1820 to 1830, there was a drop in overall population of about 15,000 in Norfolk County, despite the fact that other urban areas experienced significant population growth.

Like other Southern states, Virginia struggled with slavery, especially as it became less important in the mixed agricultural economy that was replacing that of tobacco. Virginia considered ideas to either phase out slavery through law (see Thomas Jefferson Randolph's 1832 resolution) or to "repatriate" blacks by sending them to Africa to establish a colony at Liberia. The American Colonization Society (ACS), established in 1816, was the largest of groups founded for that purpose. Many emigrants from Virginia and North Carolina embarked for Africa from Norfolk. One such emigrant was Joseph Jenkins Roberts, a native of Norfolk who would go on to become the first president of Liberia. Active emigration through the ACS came to an end following the Civil War.

By 1840, Norfolk's population was 10,920 for the borough proper (not including the rest of the county). With the concentration of population came more interest in education and culture. In 1841 an ambitious new school building was completed for Norfolk Academy, designed by Thomas U. Walter as a replica of the temple of Theseus in Athens. In 1845, Norfolk was incorporated as a city. By 1850 the city's population was 14,326 persons, including 4,295 enslaved African Americans and 956 free African Americans.

Transportation improvements contributed to growth. In 1832 the steam ferry Gosport began service, linking Norfolk and Portsmouth. In 1851, the Commonwealth authorized the charter of an 80-mile (130 km) railroad connecting busy port of Norfolk and the growing industrial city of Petersburg. Completed in 1858, this important line was the predecessor of today's Norfolk Southern Railway.

On June 7, 1855, the ship Benjamin Franklin detoured into Portsmouth for urgent repairs. The city's health officer inspected the ship, as was standard practice at the time, and suspected something was awry, despite assurances from the captain that ship was free of disease. The officer ordered that the ship be held at anchor in the harbor for 11 days. Afterwards, he returned to the ship and allowed it dock under the condition that the ship's hold not be broken. Within several days of the ship's docking, however, the first cases of yellow fever appeared in people whose homes were near the wharf. By July, the epidemic was in full outbreak and would eventually result in the deaths of over 2,000 in Norfolk. At its peak, the epidemic was claiming more than 100 lives a day, and Norfolk did not recover its population fully until after the end of the American Civil War. In 1856 the Sisters of Charity founded St. Vincent's Hospital, in part as a reaction to the previous year's epidemic.

== American Civil War ==
In early 1861, Norfolk voters instructed their delegate to vote for ratification of the ordinance of secession. Soon thereafter, Virginia voted to secede from the Union. Richmond became the capital of the Confederacy, and the American Civil War began.

When Virginia joined the Confederate States of America they demanded the surrender of all Federal property in their state, including the Norfolk Navy Yard (then called the Gosport Shipyard). Falling for an elaborate Confederate ruse orchestrated by civilian railroad builder, and future Confederate general, William Mahone, the Union shipyard commander Charles Stewart McCauley ordered the burning of the shipyard and the evacuation of its personnel to Fort Monroe across Hampton Roads. The capture of the shipyard allowed a tremendous amount of war material to fall into Confederate hands including the remains of the burned and scuttled naval frigate USS Merrimac.

In the spring of 1862, the remains of the USS Merrimac were rebuilt at Norfolk Navy Yard as an ironclad and renamed as the CSS Virginia. The Battle of Hampton Roads began on March 8. The battle would ultimately ended in a stalemate however, as neither navy was able to do significant damage to the other due to the heavy armor plating. Over the next several months, CSS Virginia tried in vain to engage the Monitor, but the USS Monitor was under strict orders not to fight unless absolutely necessary.

On May 6, while the Union Army under General George B. McClellan was fighting the Peninsula Campaign, President Abraham Lincoln visited Fort Monroe across Hampton Roads. Recognizing the value of Norfolk, he decided on a plan to capture the city and thus eliminate the base for the CSS Virginia. On May 8, Union ships, including the USS Monitor and batteries on Fort Wool opened fire on the Confederate batteries on Sewell's Point. Only the approach of the CSS Virginia drove the Union ships back to the protection of Fort Monroe. At this point, Lincoln directed the invasion to be on Willoughby Spit, away from the Confederate batteries, the next day. On the morning of May 10, General John Wool landed 6,000 Union soldiers on Willoughby Spit. Within hours, the Union troops arrived at Norfolk. Mayor William Lamb surrendered the city without firing a shot.

For the duration of the Civil War, the city was held under Martial law. Many private and public buildings were confiscated for federal use, including nearby plantations. Mayor Lamb did manage to successfully hide the city's colonial era silver mace underneath a fireplace hearth to avoid having it confiscated or melted down by union troops.

Enslaved African Americans did not wait until the end of the war to be emancipated. With the arrival of Union troops, thousands of slaves escaped to Norfolk and Fort Monroe to claim their freedom. Even before the arrival of northern missionaries, African Americans began to set up schools for children and adults both.

== Reconstruction to the Jamestown Exposition (1865–1907) ==
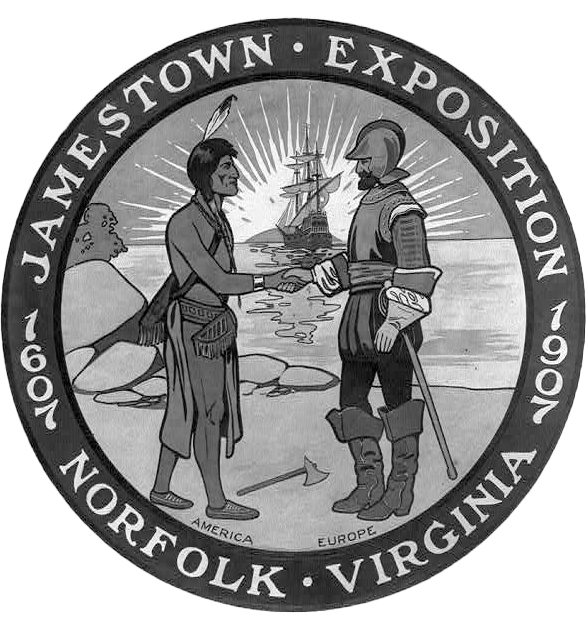
Logo for Jamestown Exposition in 1907

By 1870, the end of Reconstruction was at hand in Norfolk. Union occupation troops withdrew and Virginia was readmitted to the Union. During this time, African-Americans throughout Hampton Roads were elected to state and local offices. Gradually they were restricted from office and voting by the whites' paramilitary violence and intimidation, and increasingly discriminatory legislation, including Jim Crow Laws to control work, segregated public facilities and transportation, and other aspects of life.

Most significantly, in 1902 Virginia joined other Southern states in creating a new constitution that effectively disenfranchised all African Americans through creating new blocks to voter registration that were selectively and subjectively applied against them. White supremacists achieved their goal: from 1900 to 1904, estimated black voter turnout in the Presidential elections in Virginia dropped to zero.

African Americans would not regain the ability to exercise suffrage and full civil rights until their activism in the Civil Rights Movement secured passage of federal legislation in the mid-1960s. Despite this severe restriction, many African Americans created families, churches, schools, community organizations and stable lives for themselves. Many became landowners and farmed small plots in the Norfolk area. The area's turn to mixed agriculture before the Civil War created a more favorable environment for small plots and mixed produce.

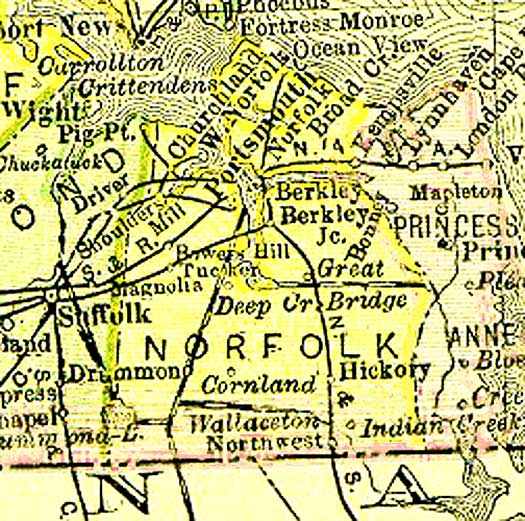
Map of the city of Norfolk and Norfolk County, Virginia, 1895

In 1883, the first car of bituminous coal arrived from the Pocahontas fields over the Norfolk & Western Railway and by 1886 the tracks were extended right up to the coal piers at Lambert's Point to handle the increasing volume, creating one of the largest coal transshipment ports in the world. In 1894, classes began in the city's first public high school. That same year the new technology of the electric street railway was introduced to Norfolk and would, within ten years, link Norfolk with Sewell's Point, Ocean View, South Norfolk, Berkley, Pinner's Point (all of which were independent communities within Norfolk County at that time), and the neighboring City of Portsmouth.

1907 brought both the Virginian Railway and the Jamestown Exposition to Sewell's Point. The large Naval Review at the Exposition demonstrated the peninsula's favorable location, laying the groundwork for the world's largest naval base. Commemorating the 300th anniversary of the founding of Jamestown, the exposition brought many prominent people including President Theodore Roosevelt, congressmen, senators, and diplomats from 21 countries. Henry Huttleston Rogers and Mark Twain also attended the expo. Many naval ships from different countries were present for the celebration. The area where the exposition took would become Naval Air Station Hampton Roads, later Naval Station Norfolk, ten years later in 1917, during the height of World War I.

=== Resort areas and transportation development ===
Resort areas in remote areas along the Chesapeake Bay and the Atlantic Ocean grew in the period after the civil war as Norfolk residents embraced the concept of the day trips to the beaches. Ocean View on the bay in Norfolk County was originally surveyed for lots before the war, but establishment of a 9-mile (14 km) long narrow gauge steam passenger railroad service between downtown Norfolk and Ocean View crossing what was then known as Tanner's Creek (later renamed Lafayette River) brought the masses. Originally named the Ocean View Railroad, it was later known as the Norfolk and Ocean View Railroad. A small steam locomotive named the General William B. Mahone hauled ever increasing volumes of passengers, primarily on the weekends. Similarly, the Norfolk & Virginia Beach Railway inaugurated rail service in 1883 to the rural community of Seatack located on the Atlantic Ocean in Princess Anne County. The oceanfront area at Seatack became the site of the area's first resort hotel.

As attendance boomed, in both instances, the steam-powered services between downtown Norfolk and the beaches at Ocean View and Seatack were later replaced by electric-powered trolley cars. These in turn, were later replaced by highways and the automobile. Cottage Toll Road, later largely superseded by Tidewater Drive led to Ocean View. Leading from Norfolk to Seatack, where the resort strip became known as Virginia Beach, in 1922, the new hard-surfaced Virginia Beach Boulevard was a major factor in the growth of the Oceanfront town and adjacent portions of Princess Anne County.

Ocean View gradually evolved into a streetcar suburb, and was annexed by Norfolk in 1923. Virginia Beach became an incorporated town in 1906, and an independent city of the second class in 1952, sharing courts and some constitutional officers with Princess Anne County. 11 years later, the 2-square-mile (5.2 km^{2}) city was politically consolidated with county (which was 100 times larger in land area)to form the modern City of Virginia Beach, now the City of Norfolk's neighbor to the east, part of a wave of political consolidations in the Hampton Roads region which took place between 1952 and 1976.

== Modern Era ==
=== Annexation and Expansion (1906–1930) ===
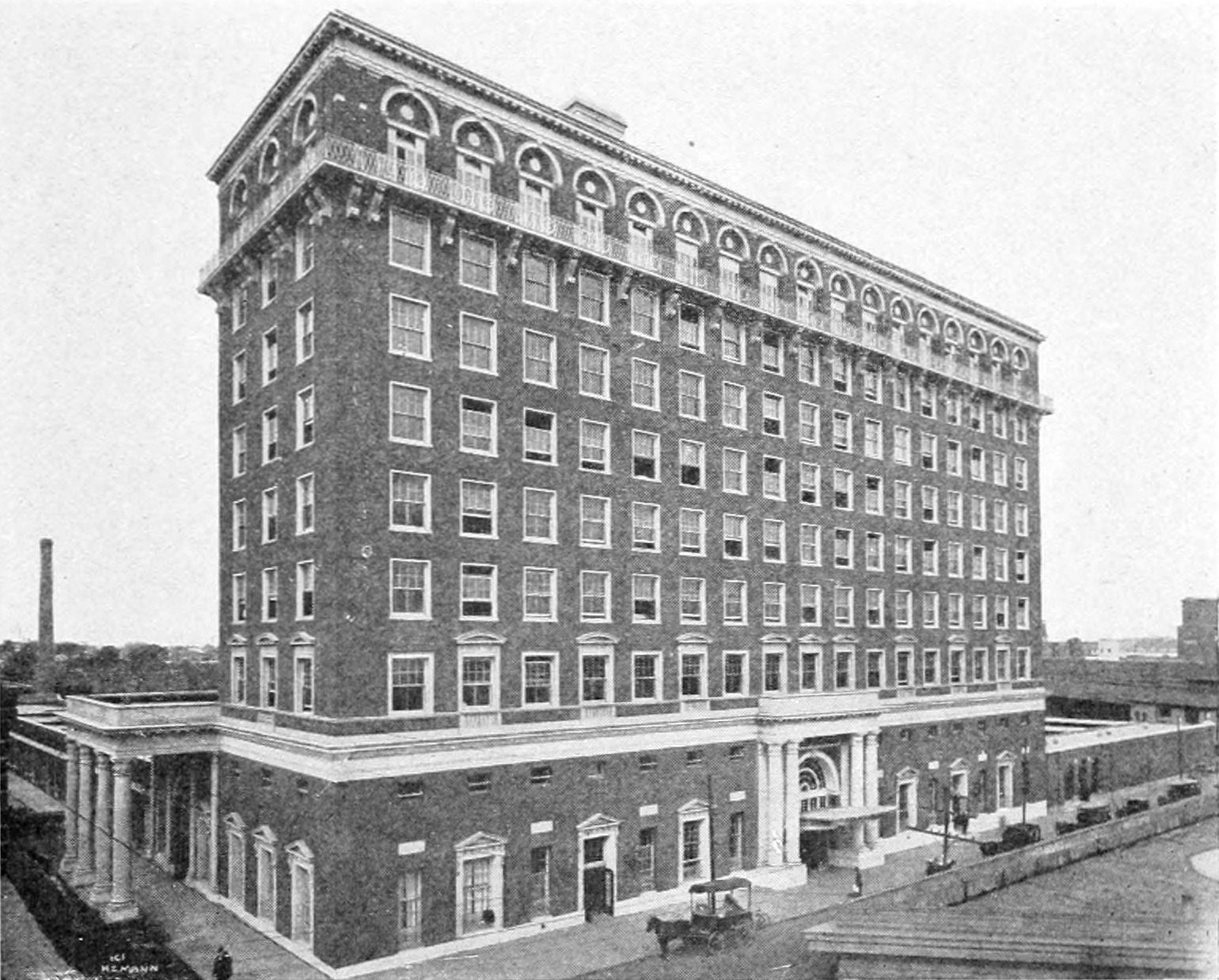
The Norfolk Terminal Station which opened in 1912

Norfolk continued to grow in the first half of the 20th century as it expanded its borders through annexation. In 1906, the incorporated town of Berkley was annexed, stretching the city limits across the Elizabeth River. The town became a borough along with the neighborhoods of Beacon Light and Hardy Field. Lambert's Point, home of a railroad pier, and Huntersville were annexed into Norfolk five years later in 1911.

In 1923, the city limits were expanded to include Sewell's Point, Willoughby Spit, the town of Campostella, and Ocean View, adding the naval base and miles of beach property fronting on Hampton Roads and Chesapeake Bay. These newly incorporated areas grew rapidly along with the 1906-created Larchmont neighborhood, five miles (8 km) from downtown. Wards Corner, then just outside Norfolk, became the first non-downtown shopping district in the country.

The Norfolk Naval Base grew rapidly as a result of World War I and this created a housing shortage in the area.

In 1930, Old Dominion University was established as the Norfolk Division of the College of William & Mary. ODU awarded its first bachelor's degrees in 1956 and became an independent institution in 1962.

=== The Navy's City: Two World Wars (1917–1950s) ===
By 1950, Norfolk was the fifth fastest growing metropolitan area in the United States. As a result of the end of World War II, another housing shortage was created. In 1955, Tanners Creek was annexed and ownership of Broad Creek Village transferred to Housing Authority. Norfolk had officially become the largest city in state, with a population of 297,253. After a smaller annexation in 1959, and a 1988 land swap with Virginia Beach, the city assumed its current boundaries.

=== Jim Crow Norfolk and Black Institutions (1900–1950s) ===
During this period, the Norfolk Journal and Guide grew to become one of the largest Black newspapers in the United States. Founded in 1910 as a newsletter for a fraternal order, by 1940 it had 32 pages and over 80,000 subscribers. The paper staged campaigns against lynching, pushed for improvements for Black residents of Norfolk, condemned the Great Migration, and pressed for voter registration and military integration. The paper tended to have a more conservative take on interracial issues than major Black newspapers based out of the North, and this allowed it to thrive and collect advertisements from businesses in the South. Over time, it had national and local editions covering Virginian cities, D.C. and Baltimore. P. B. Young and his family ran the paper during its expansion and peak.

Norfolk State University was founded as the Norfolk Unit of Virginia State University and became an independent institution in 1969.

=== Highways and Suburbanization (1950s–1991) ===
Hampton Roads Bridge Tunnel

With the dawn of the Interstate Highway System, new highways opened and a series of bridges and tunnels opening over fifteen years would link Norfolk with the Peninsula, Portsmouth, and Virginia Beach.

On November 1, 1957, the Hampton Roads Bridge-Tunnel opened to traffic, connecting the Virginia Peninsula with the city, signed as State Route 168. The new two-lane toll bridge-tunnel connection became a portion of Interstate 64 by the end of 1957, connecting Norfolk westward with a limited access freeway. A second parallel tube was built in 1976, expanding the road to four lanes. The two-lane Midtown Tunnel was completed September 6, 1962. On December 1, 1967, the Virginia Beach-Norfolk Expressway (Interstate 264 and State Route 44), a 12.1-mile (19.5 km) long toll road leading from Baltic Avenue in Virginia Beach to Brambleton Avenue in Norfolk, opened to traffic at a cost of $34 million.

From the 1970 Census onwards, the population of Norfolk began to decline. At the same time, the populations of nearby suburbs Virginia Beach and Chesapeake increased.

In 1991, the new Downtown Tunnel/Berkley Bridge complex was completed, with a new system of multiple lanes of highway and interchanges connecting Downtown Norfolk and Interstate 464 with the Downtown Tunnel tubes.

=== Massive Resistance and Desegregation (1954–1986) ===
In 1954, the Brown v. Board of Education Supreme Court decision determined that racial segregation in public schools (and public accommodations) was unconstitutional. However, Virginia pursued a policy to avoid desegregation that came to be called Massive Resistance. Among the actions were new state laws, called the Stanley Plan, that prohibited state funding for integrated public schools, even as some school districts began to contemplate them. It was a few years after Brown until the policy was tested.

Norfolk's private schools had been integrated four years before as the city chose to voluntarily comply with the Brown decision. However, a number of public school divisions (school districts) around the state had been reluctant to do so for fear of losing state funds. In 1958, Federal District Courts in Virginia ordered schools in Arlington County, Charlottesville, Norfolk, and Warren County, to desegregate. In the fall of 1958, a handful of public schools in three of these widespread areas opened for the first time on a racially integrated basis. In response, Virginia Governor J. Lindsay Almond ordered the schools to be closed, including six of the Norfolk Public Schools: Granby High School, Maury High School, Norview High School, Blair Junior High School, Northside Junior High School, and Norview Junior High School.

In Norfolk, the state action had the impact of locking ten thousand children out of school, which raised outcry by the public to a high level. As some children attended makeshift schools in churches, etc., the citizens voted whether to reopen the public schools. The ballot made clear that the Commonwealth of Virginia would stop funding integrated schools.

On January 19, 1959, the Virginia Supreme Court of Appeals declared the state law to be in conflict with Virginia's state constitution. The Court of Appeals ordered all public schools to be funded, whether integrated or not. Governor Almond capitulated about ten days later and asked the sitting General Assembly to rescind several "Massive Resistance" laws. On February 2, 1959, Norfolk's public schools were desegregated when 17 black children entered six previously all-white schools in Norfolk. Virginian-Pilot editor Lenoir Chambers editorialized against massive resistance, earning the Pulitzer Prize.

=== Urban Renewal and Downtown Decline (1950s–1980s) ===
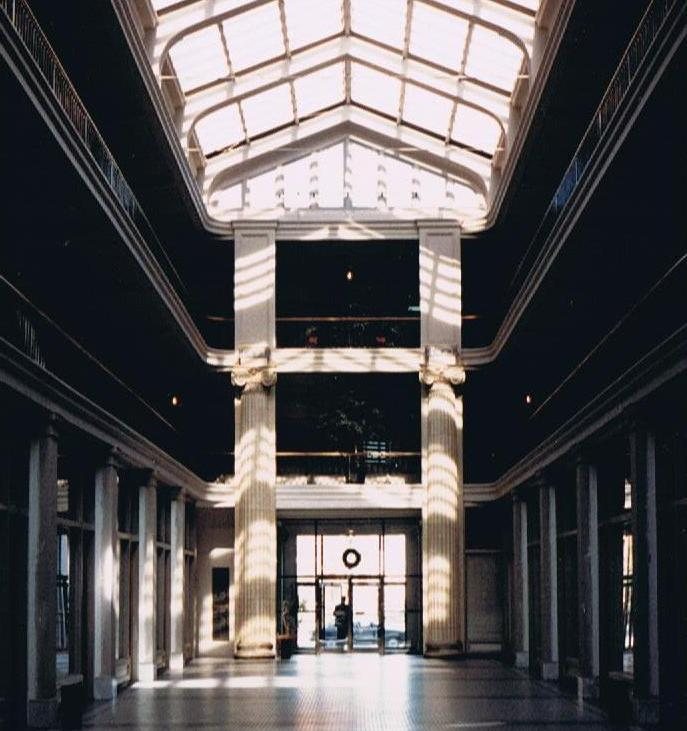
Historic Monticello Arcade

As the traditional center of shipping and port activities in the Hampton Roads region, Norfolk's downtown waterfront historically played host to numerous port and shipping-related uses. With the advent of containerized shipping in the mid-20th century, the shipping uses located on Norfolk's downtown waterfront became obsolete as larger and more modern port facilities opened elsewhere in the region. In the second half of the century, Norfolk had a vibrant retail community in its suburbs. Norfolk was also the birthplace of Econo-Travel, now Econo Lodge, one of the nation's first discount motel chains.

Similarly, the advent of newer suburban shopping destinations spelled demise for the fortunes of downtown's Granby Street commercial corridor, located just a few blocks inland from the waterfront. Granby Street traditionally played the role as the premiere shopping and gathering spot in the Hampton Roads region and numerous department stores such as Smith & Welton (1898–1988), Rice's (1918–1985) and Ames and Brownley (1898–1973), hotels and theaters once lined its sidewalks. However, new suburban shopping developments promised more convenience and comfort to the population that had moved to the suburbs. Pembroke Mall in Virginia Beach, the region's first climate-controlled shopping mall, and JANAF Shopping Center in Norfolk's Military Circle area, were built in this era.

Beginning in the 1970s, Norfolk worked towards reviving its urban core. To compete with suburban shopping destinations, Norfolk city leaders tried to create a similar mall experience on Granby Street. The city rebranded its commercial core the "Granby Street Mall", closed Granby Street to through-traffic and created a pedestrian mall. The Granby Street Mall did not succeed and the mall endured hardship through the late 1970s and early 1980s.

Another focus was the waterfront and its decaying piers and warehouses. Norfolk, using Federal urban renewal funds, began large-scale demolitions downtown. This included housing that, in the mid-20th century, did not have indoor plumbing or access to running water. The former City Market, Norfolk Terminal Station (the Union railroad station) and The Monticello Hotel were also demolished.

=== Waterfront Revival (1980s–1990s) ===
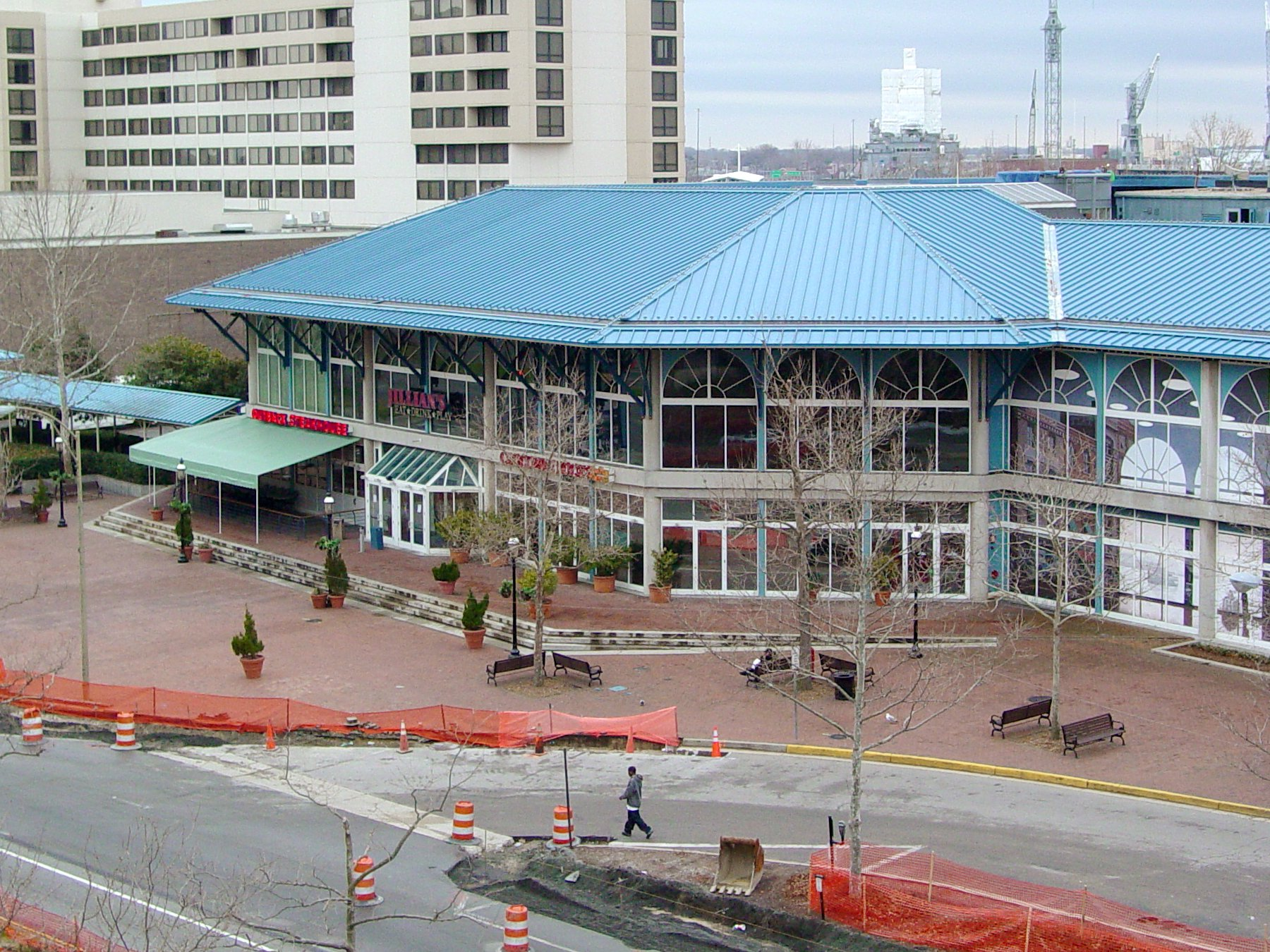
Waterside

At the water's edge, nearly all of the obsolete shipping and warehousing facilities were demolished and replaced with a new boulevard, Waterside Drive. Among the buildings erected were the

- Waterside Festival Marketplace, an indoor mall similar to Baltimore's Inner Harbor Pavilions
- Waterfront Town Point Park, an esplanade park with wide open riverfront views
- Norfolk Omni Hotel.

On the inland side of Waterside Drive, the demolition of the warehouses and wharves made way for high rise buildings.

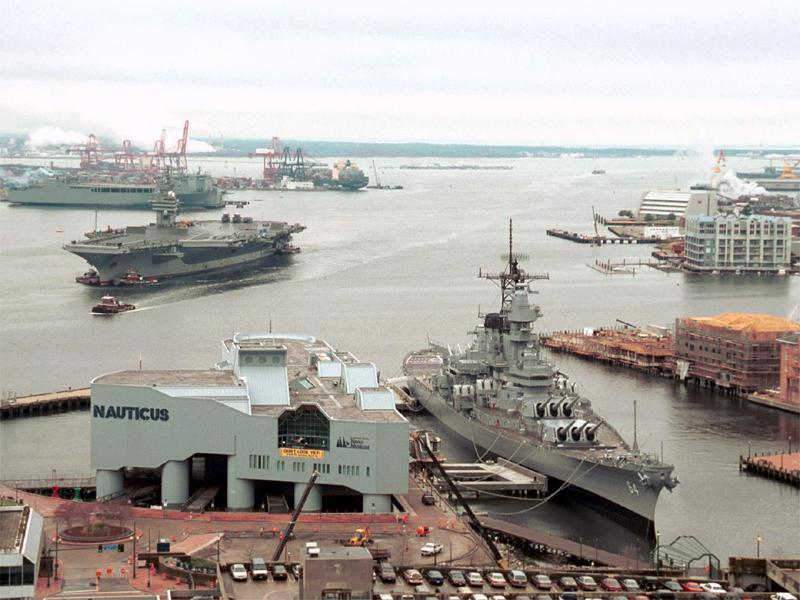
Nauticus

In the mid 1990s, Norfolk again attempted to rejuvenate Granby Street, which continued to lag behind the waterfront in terms of revitalization. In late 1996, it was announced that a new downtown shopping mall would be built, in which Nordstrom would to open a store. The mall was named the MacArthur Center, in honor of the five-star World War II General whose tomb was located across the street from the proposed site. Nearly $100 million in public funds was committed to infrastructure improvements and construction of parking garages to support the shopping mall. The MacArthur Center opened in March 1999 as a three-story enclosed shopping mall with an 18-screen stadium seating movie theater.

=== Resilience and Reinvention (2000–2026) ===
On September 18, 2003, Hurricane Isabel made landfall in North Carolina. In Norfolk, wind gusts were recorded to 75mph. The hurricane downed trees and power lines, causing power outrages for over 2 million households in Virginia. Isabel caused storm surge over the Chesapeake Bay of up to 6 feet. The hurricane also flooded the Midtown Tunnel with millions of gallons of water. Isabel was responsible for 10 direct deaths and 22 indirect deaths in Virginia, as well as $925 million in damages.

In August 2011, Virginia's first light rail train, The Tide, began service in Norfolk, stopping at EVMS and Downtown Norfolk before continuing along I-264 to Norfolk State University and Newtown Road.

In 2016, the City of Norfolk adopted two resolutions to include flood resilience in city planning: Norfolk Vision 2100, a long-term plan, and plaNorfolk2030, a short-term plan. In 2018, the City also adopted a zoning ordinance to promote flood-resilient developments.

During a national decline in malls and the COVID-19 pandemic, MacArthur Center struggled with store vacancies. In 2023, the City of Norfolk purchased the MacArthur Center for $18 million. The mall closed after 27 years of operation in June 2026. The City plans to revitalize the area as part of its Downtown Norfolk 2030 Plan to a mixed-use district.

== See also ==
- Timeline of Norfolk, Virginia
- List of newspapers in Virginia in the 18th-century: Norfolk
- List of mayors of Norfolk, Virginia
