= Downtown Norfolk, Virginia =

Norfolk Central Business District
- Central Business District
- Downtown Norfolk
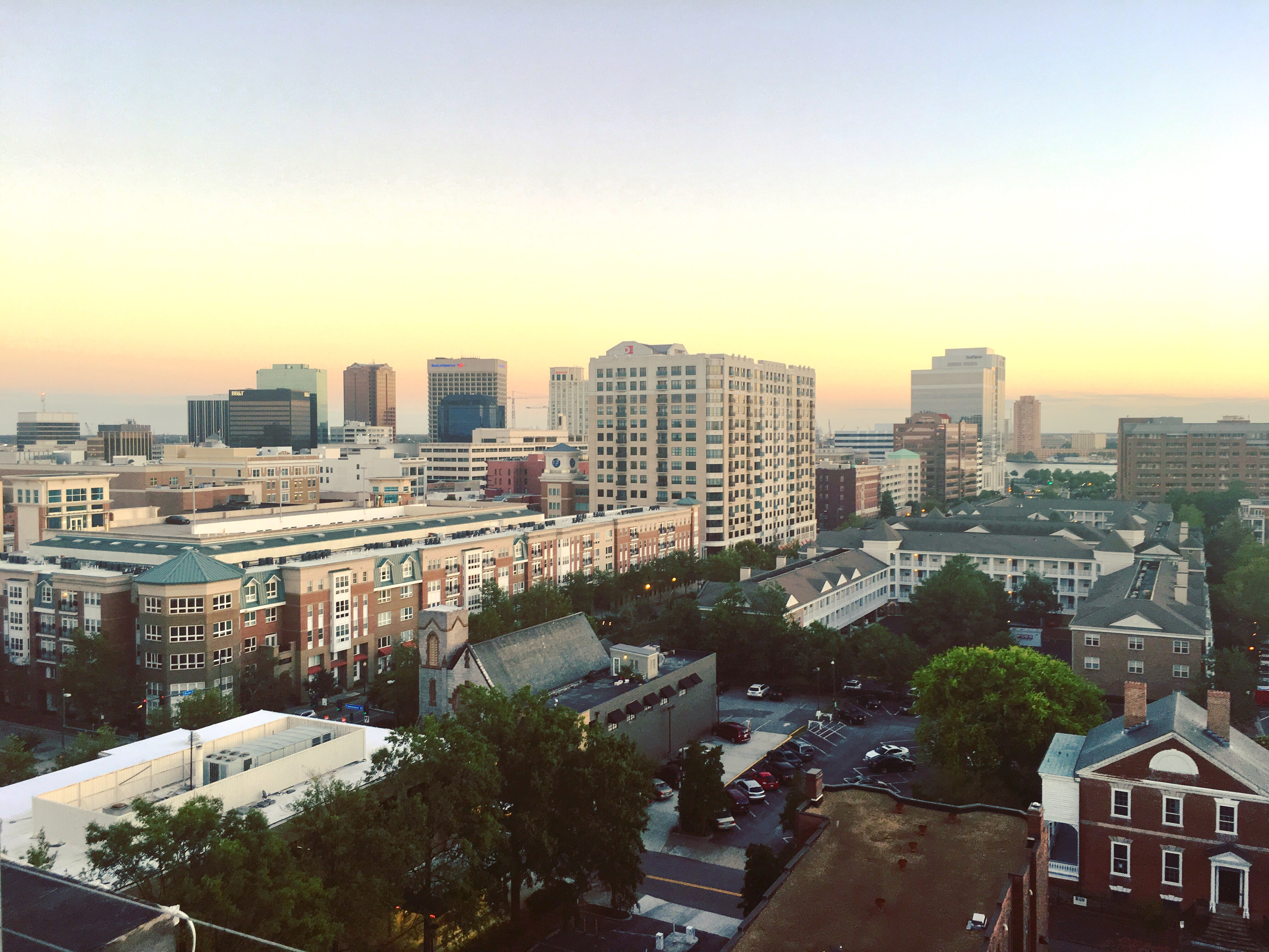
- Skyline of Downtown Norfolk
- Nickname: "The Heart of Virginia's Waterfront"
- Motto: "Thou Shalt Grow"
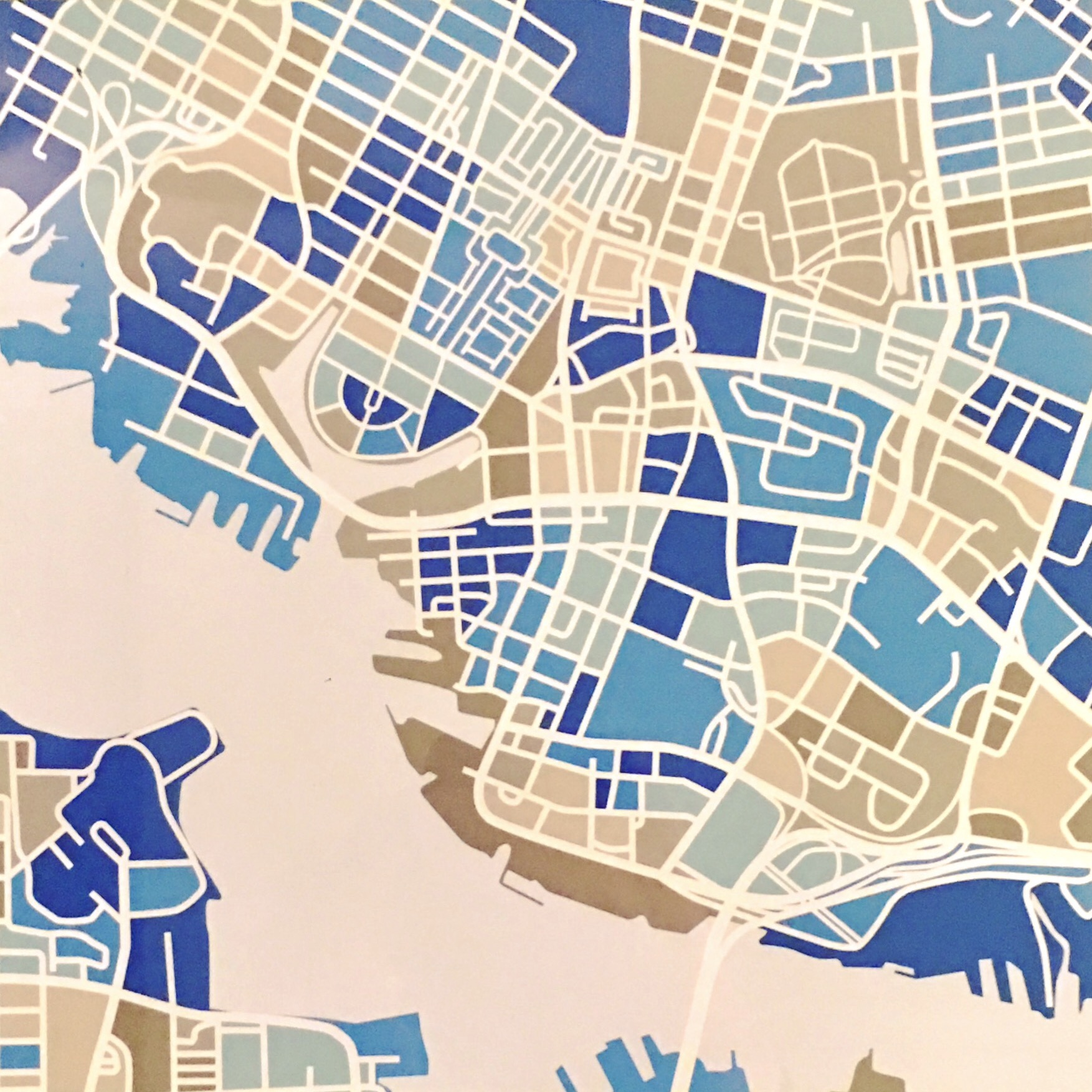
- Artist's depiction of Downtown Norfolk's Road Layout

- Location of Downtown Norfolk in the contiguous United States Norfolk Central Business District (the United States)
- Coordinates: 36°50′49″N 76°17′07″W
- ZIP code: 23510
- Area codes: 757, 948
- Website: www.downtownnorfolk.org

Downtown Norfolk serves as the traditional center of commerce, government, and culture in the Hampton Roads region. Norfolk, Virginia's downtown waterfront shipping and port activities historically played host to numerous and often noxious port and shipping-related uses. With the advent of containerized shipping in the mid-19th century, the shipping uses located on Norfolk's downtown waterfront became obsolete as larger and more modern port facilities opened elsewhere in the region. The vacant piers and cargo warehouses eventually became a blight on downtown and Norfolk's fortunes as a whole. But in the second half of the century, Norfolk had a vibrant retail community in its suburbs; companies like Smith & Welton, High's, Colonial Stores, Goldman's Shoes, Lerner Shops, Hofheimer's, Giant Open Air, Dollar Tree and K & K Toys were regional leaders in their respective fields. Norfolk was also the birthplace of Econo-Travel, now Econo Lodge, one of the nation's first discount motel chains.

Similarly, the advent of newer suburban shopping destinations spelled demise for the fortunes of downtown's Granby Street commercial corridor, located just a few blocks inland from the waterfront. Granby Street traditionally played the role as the premiere shopping and gathering spot in the Hampton Roads region. Retailers ranged from low-priced variety stores such as Woolworth's and Grants to more upscale department stores such as Smith & Welton (1898–1988), Rices Nachmans (1918–1985) and Ames and Brownley (1898–1973), and fine hotels and theaters lined its sidewalks. However, new suburban shopping developments promised more convenience and comfort. The opening of Pembroke Mall in Virginia Beach, the region's first climate controlled shopping mall, and JANAF Shopping Center in Norfolk's Military Circle area, helped foment Granby Street's spiral into commercial obsolescence. With amenities such as ample free parking at the door of one's favorite store, and in the case of Pembroke Mall, climate control, the businesses of downtown's Granby Street found it harder and harder to compete.

Beginning in the 1920s, Norfolk's city leaders began what would be a long push to revive the fortunes of its urban core.

== Overview ==
=== Historic District ===
The Downtown Norfolk Historic District is a national historic district listed on the National Register of Historic Places in 1987 and expanded in 2001. It encompasses 97 contributing buildings in the central business district of Norfolk. The largely commercial buildings reflect Norfolk's prosperity of the 1890s through the 1930s. The district includes notable examples of the Classical Revival, Beaux Arts, and Italianate styles. Notable buildings include the Showcase Building (c. 1914), Seaboard Citizens' National Bank Building (c. 1935), Citizen's Bank (now Wheat) Building (1897–1899), Virginia Club (1903), Hotel Fairfax (1907), Colonial Theater (1907, now demolished), Lorraine (later the Hotel Thomas Nelson) (1905), Lynnhaven Hotel (1906), Royster Building (1912), Merchants and Mechanics Savings Bank (1913), Smith & Welton (1917), NorVa Theater (1922), Loew's State Theater (1926, now TCC Roper Center for Performing Arts), Selden Arcade (1931), and the Navy YMCA (1906). Located in the district are the separately listed Walter E. Hoffman United States Courthouse (1932–1934), Owen B. Pickett United States Custom House (1852), Monticello Arcade (1907), Wells Theatre (1913), and Old Norfolk City Hall (1898–1900).

=== Granby Street ===
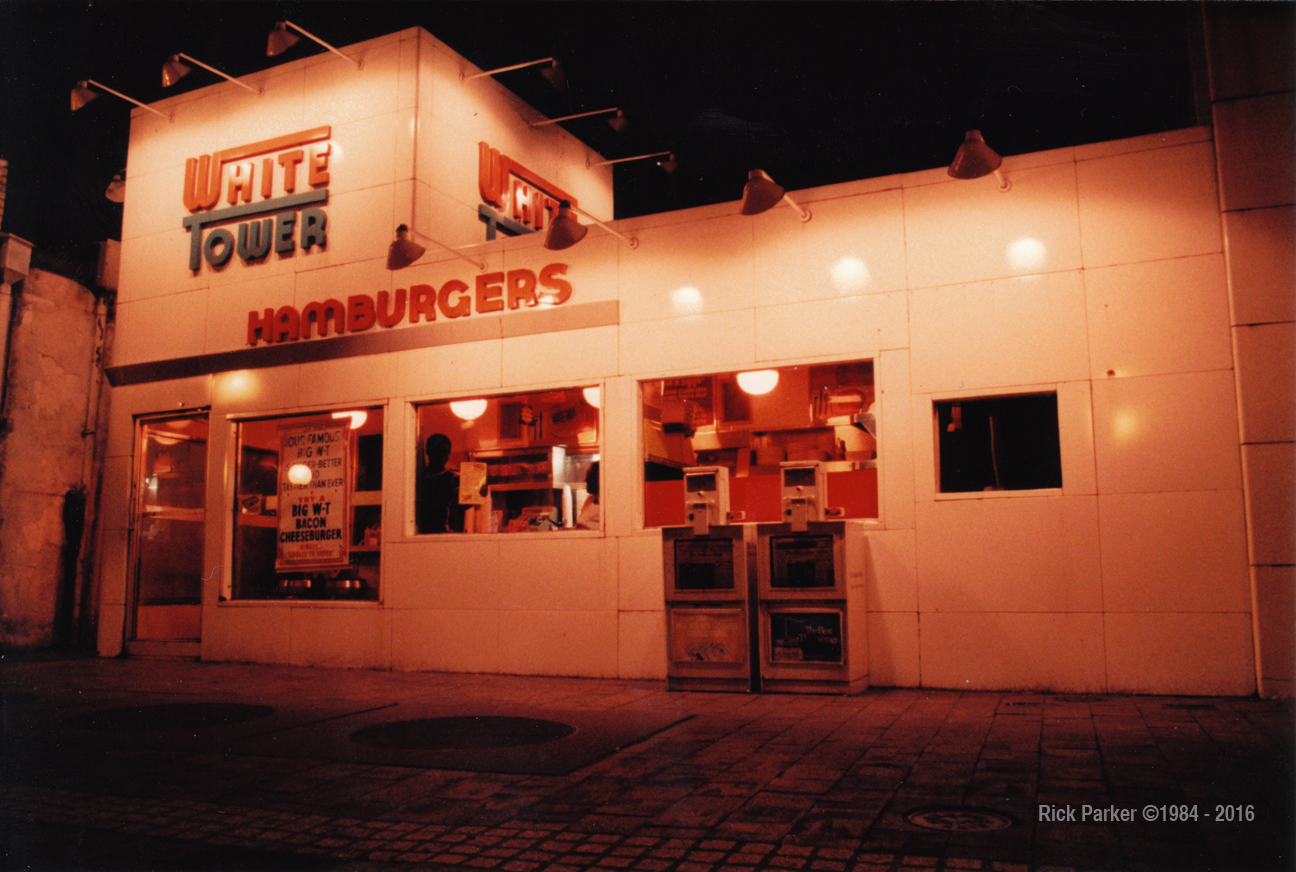
A White Tower restaurant on Granby St. during its blighted Granby Mall era, 1984; has been demolished and the area has been successfully revitalized.

To compete with the suburban shopping destinations, Norfolk city leaders tried to create the same mall experience on Granby Street. The city rebranded its commercial core the "Granby Mall." Granby Street was closed to auto through-traffic, repaved, landscaped and new street furniture and fixtures were installed. Granby Mall was a concept by city leaders with the best of intentions, but it actually ended up speeding the demise of Granby Street as a viable commercial destination. The closing of Granby Street to auto traffic actually made the district more inconvenient for potential customers and reduced the amount of pedestrian traffic that passed by the businesses. The reduced pedestrian and automobile traffic on the street created an atmosphere of abandonment and probably contributed to an increase in downtown crime, which further fueled customer fears of downtown, which in turn caused additional businesses to close, and on and on. This vicious cycle of abandonment and blight persisted for much of the late 1970s and early 1980s.

=== Urban Renewal ===
While Granby Street experienced its decline, Norfolk city leaders were also focused on the waterfront and its collection of decaying piers and warehouses. Federal urban renewal programs such as the Housing Act of 1949 promised cities around the country millions of dollars in government grants for the purpose of removing blight conditions and preparing urban land for redevelopment. Norfolk, as with many other cities, took full advantage of these Federal urban renewal funds and began large-scale demolitions of broad swaths of downtown. This included slum housing that, in the mid-20th century, did not have indoor plumbing or access to running water. However, Norfolk's urban renewal also included the demolition of many prominent city buildings, including the former City Market, Norfolk Terminal Station (the Union railroad station), The Monticello Hotel, and large swaths of urban fabric that, were they still in existence today, might be the source of additional historic urban character, including the East Main Street district (where the current civic complex is located).

- Downtown Norfolk Historic District
- U.S. National Register of Historic Places
- U.S. Historic district
- Virginia Landmarks Register
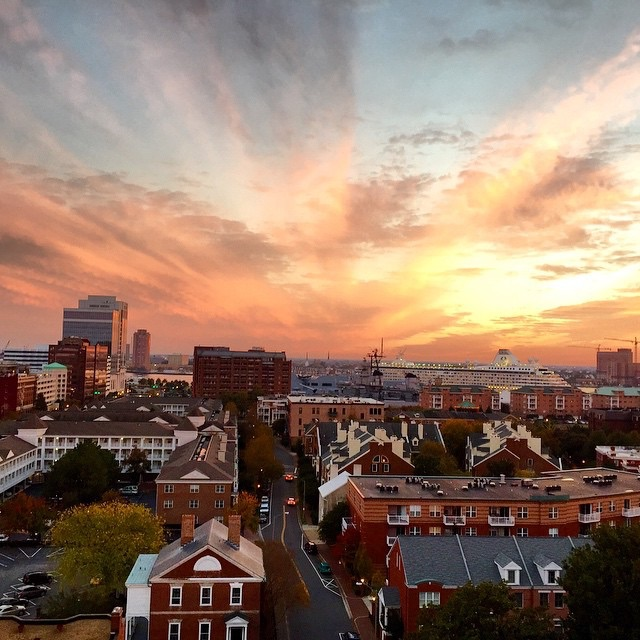
- Norfolk's Freemason Historic District at sunset
- Area: 43.3 acres (17.5 ha)
- Architect: Cassell, Charles E.; Et al.
- Architectural style: Classical Revival, Beaux Arts, Italianate, Colonial, Federalist, Victorian
- NRHP reference No.: 87000475, 01000613 (Boundary Increase)
- VLR No.: 122-0265

Significant dates
- Added to NRHP: March 20, 1987, May 30, 2001 (Boundary Increase)
- Designated VLR: December 9, 1986, December 6, 2000

At the water's edge, nearly all of the obsolete shipping and warehousing facilities were demolished. In their place, planners created a new boulevard, Waterside Drive. In place of the piers and warehouses rose: the Waterside Festival Marketplace, an indoor mall created by the Rouse Company and similar to Baltimore's Inner Harbor Pavilions; the waterfront Town Point Park - an esplanade park with wide open riverfront views; and the Norfolk Omni Hotel. On the inland side of Waterside Drive, the demolition of the warehouses and wharves created new parcels on which most of the highrise buildings in Norfolk's skyline now stand.

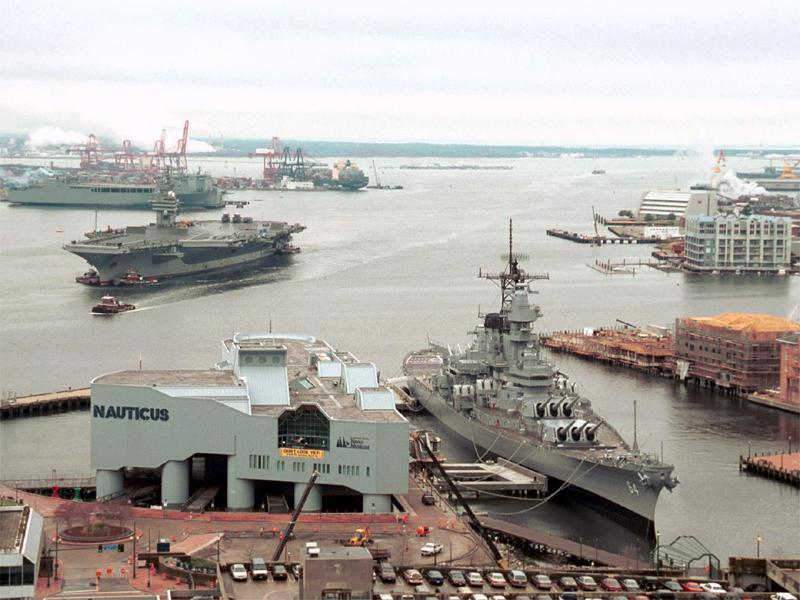
Nauticus

=== Waterfront ===
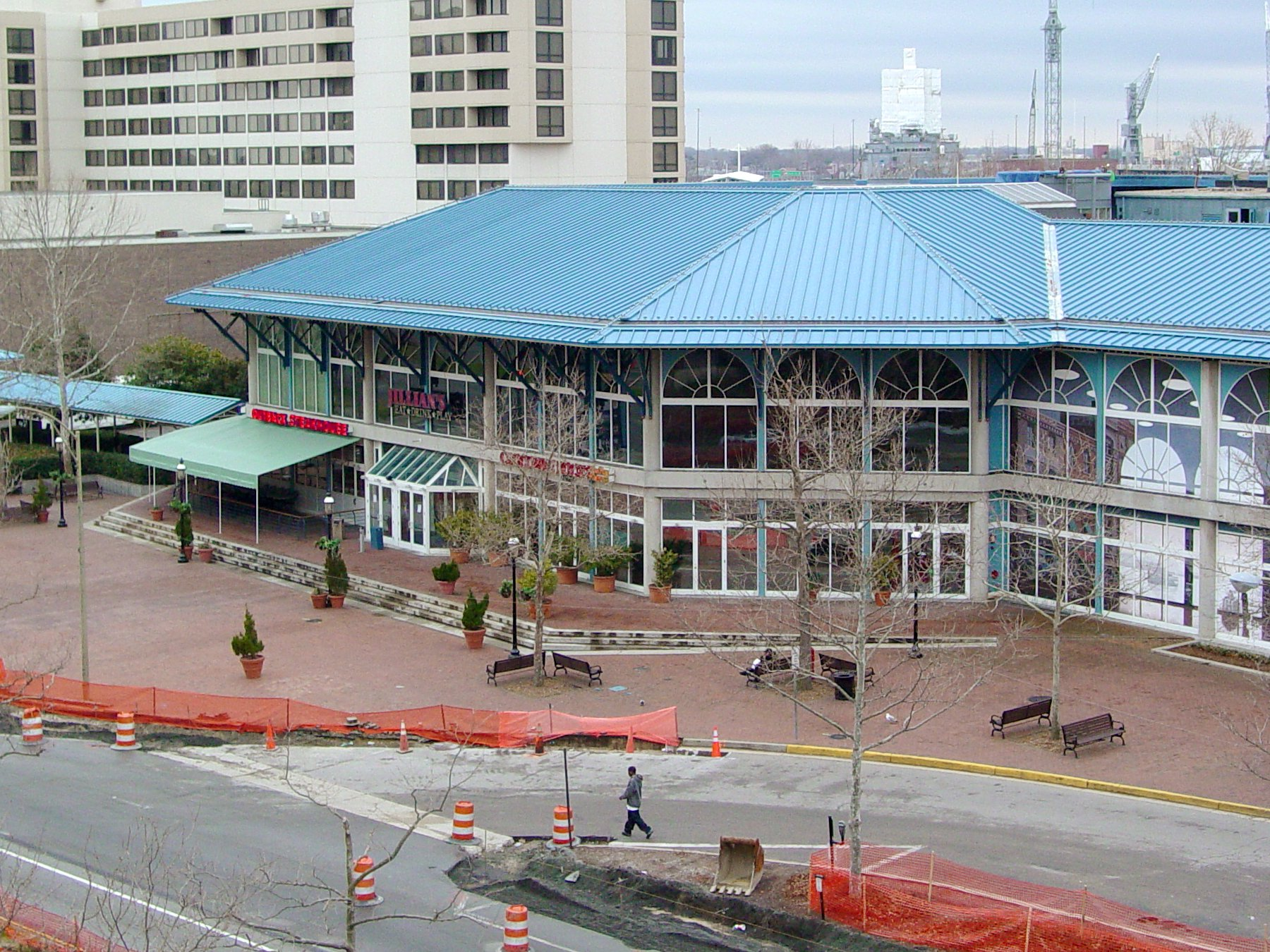
The Waterside

In contrast to the failure of the Granby Mall initiative, the redevelopment of Norfolk's waterfront turned out to be an almost immediate success. Town Point Park created a pleasant and inviting new public space at which Norfolkers gather, whether for formally planned events like Harborfest, or for more passive enjoyment of the views, breeze, and people watching. The Waterside festival marketplace opened in June 1983, creating a new space for entertainment and shopping and serving as a catalyst for downtown renewal. However, by 2012 the Waterside's popularity was in decline; as restaurants and shops had closed, leaving much of the building vacant. With sentiment growing among citizens and city officials that the structure may have outlived its usefulness, the city council was considering several plans for use of the space.

Nauticus, the National Maritime Center, was constructed on a former pier adjacent to Town Point Park. Adjacent to Nauticus, the Halfe Moone Cruise and Celebration Center, a cruise-ship terminal and event venue, opened in 2007. The USS Wisconsin is docked for permanent public exhibition. The clearance of the obsolete warehouses and wharves from the waterfront also created real estate development that has brought hundreds of millions of dollars of investment in office buildings. The transformation of downtown Norfolk's waterfront skyline is so dramatic that it is largely unrecognizable to anyone who may have left the city in the early 1980s.

=== MacArthur Center ===
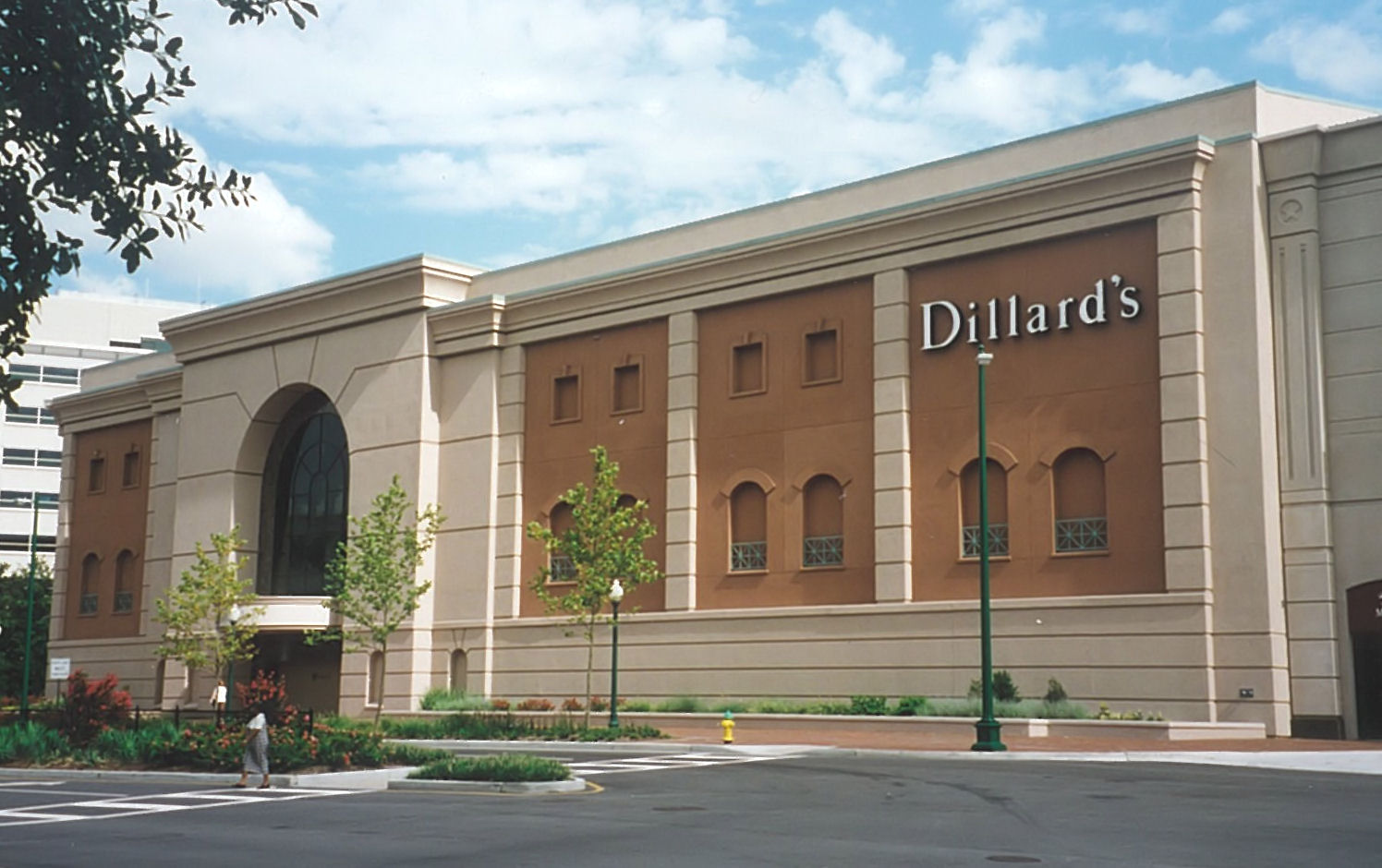
Dillard's department store, MacArthur Center, 2009

In the mid-1990s, with the fortunes of the waterfront looking brighter and more solid, Norfolk leaders once again turned their attention back to the historic Granby Street core of downtown, which continued to lag behind the waterfront in terms of revitalization. After the failure of the Granby Mall project, city leaders were intent on finding some way to bring commercial activity back to downtown in a major way. The idea of creating an upscale regional mall on the 17 acres (69,000 m^{2}) cleared during urban renewal just one block east of Granby Street had remained in the minds of Norfolk's economic development officials for many years; at one point, vice mayor, and later judge, Joseph Jordan proposed an enormous, enclosed shopping center to be known as Norfolk Gardens, so elaborate as to include indoor amusement park rides, presaging the development years later of Bloomington, Minnesota's Mall of America. Norfolk had long courted upscale Seattle-based retailer Nordstrom to locate in Norfolk and economic development officials made numerous appeals to the luxury department store. In late 1997, Norfolk officials made the announcement that they had finally received a commitment from Nordstrom to open a store in a new downtown shopping mall. Norfolk officials named the mall, MacArthur Center, in honor of the five-star World War II General whose tomb is located across the street from the proposed site. In return for opening a store at the new mall, Norfolk officials allocated nearly $100 million in public funds to infrastructure improvements and construction of parking garages to support the shopping mall.

Construction of MacArthur Center began in late 1996 and the mall opened in March 1999 to much acclaim. MacArthur Center opened as a three-story enclosed shopping mall with Dillard's and Nordstrom as the first two anchor department stores. Regal Cinemas operates an 18-screen stadium seating movie theater on most of the third floor of the mall. There is space for a future anchor store at the northwest end of the mall.

MacArthur Center introduced upscale retailing to the Hampton Roads region and it featured the premier of a number of retailers that did not previously exist in Hampton Roads (White House Black Market, Pottery Barn, Z Gallerie, Nordstrom, Johnny Rockets, Chico's, Coach, among others). MacArthur Center's entry to the Hampton Roads market heightened the competition in the retail industry and prompted waves of upgrade and investment at numerous other shopping malls around the region, especially at MacArthur Center's main competitor, Lynnhaven Mall in Virginia Beach, which announced a strategy to renovate the mall and upgrade the tenant mix to reposition it as a worthy competitor to its new Norfolk neighbor.

In a touch of irony, the primary element that nearly killed Granby Street as a commercial destination - the climate controlled shopping mall - is probably what saved Granby Street from wholesale abandonment and breathed into it new life. During the construction of MacArthur Center, Norfolk invested additional funds on infrastructure improvements throughout downtown. Sidewalks were rebuilt, additional lighting was added and streets were repaved throughout the area. A parking garage on Monticello Avenue north of MacArthur Center was partially demolished in order to reconnect the western and eastern segments of Freemason Street, which were previously blocked by the garage.

With the promise of thousands of new shoppers coming to nearby MacArthur Center, owners of properties throughout downtown reinvested in their buildings and made them ready for new retail and residential uses. Tidewater Community College opened its Norfolk campus and central administrative offices on Granby Street, locating its library in the painstakingly renovated former Smith & Welton department store building. The formerly vacant storefronts on Granby Street were repopulated by so many trendy restaurants and bars that the street, once a destination primarily for homeless and vagrant individuals, became a new hub for the sophisticated segment of the Hampton Roads region's nightlife. The residential population of downtown grew as unused commercial buildings were converted into lofts and condominiums and additional residential developments rose on formerly vacant land. One such building, the Norfolk Rotunda Building , located on St. Paul's Blvd. and in front of MacArthur Center, opening in 2007. Formerly a bank, the building now holds 66 luxury condominiums, and stands seven stories tall, the top two stories being penthouse suites. Since MacArthur Center's opening, three new office towers were completed: 150 West Main Street (located at Boush Street and Main Street, completed in 2002, 20 stories, 292 ft (89 m) tall), the Dominion Enterprises Building (150 Granby Street, completed in 2007, 20 stories, 267 ft (81 m) tall), and the Wells Fargo Center (440 Monticello Avenue, completed in 2010, 23 stories,298 ft (91 m) tall) which contains an office tower, street level retail, and apartments.

The MacArthur Center center began to suffer as part of the global retail apocalypse, with many closures starting in 2018. The mall's two anchor stores eventually closed, with Nordstrom in April, 2019 and Dillard's in September, 2023. As of 2024, the mall was only 56% occupied, the largest tenant being Regal Cinemas.

The City of Norfolk purchased the MacArthur Center in 2023, and has expressed plans to redevelop the site in the next decade, desiring to build "mixed used projects anchored by convening/conference center assets to include a headquarters hotel."

=== Ongoing revitalization benefits ===
Norfolk's efforts to revitalize its downtown have attracted acclaim in economic development and urban planning circles throughout the country. Publications such as the American Planning Association's monthly Planning Magazine, have hailed the tremendous rebound in the downtown residential population, and Money magazine proclaimed Norfolk as the number one city in which to live in the South in 2005.

The rising fortunes of the downtown area have helped expand the city's coffers which has in turn been able to direct its attention to revitalizing other neighborhoods of the city. Located just northwest of downtown, the Ghent district of Norfolk is one of the Hampton Roads region's premier urban residential communities. Ghent has the highest residential densities of any other area in Hampton Roads, and is home to a diverse array of people - artists, strivers, lower income to wealthy, etc. Many other areas of Norfolk are also being revitalized, including Fairmount Park Neighborhood, Ocean View and East Beach, the latter both on the Chesapeake Bay.

== See also ==
- List of tallest buildings in Norfolk, Virginia
