= Norfolk College for Young Ladies =

American finishing school in Virginia

Coordinates: 36.850004°N 76.290554°W

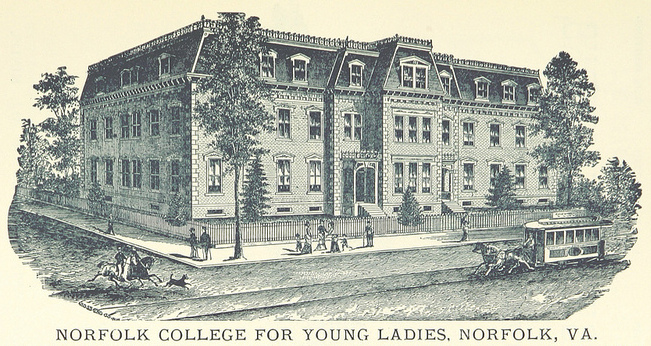
- The College building in Norfolk, VA., circa 1887
- Active: 1880–1899

External image
- Building as Hotel Lee, with retail stores on ground floors, ca. 1940

The Norfolk College for Young Ladies was a finishing school in Downtown Norfolk, Virginia that operated from 1880 to 1899.

The college was chartered on Feb. 20, 1880 and opened with 125 students. John L. Roper was president of the college's board. The school was founded to reduce the flow of young women leaving Norfolk for their education. It was located at the northwest corner of Granby and Washington Streets; in 1887 Washington Street was renamed "College Place". In 1899, Mary Washington College took over the building for a few years.

In 1905 the building reopened as the Algonquin Hotel, one of several downtown hotels newly built or converted to accommodate the crowds of visitors expected for the Jamestown Exposition in 1907. Over the years, the building operated as a hotel under various names. In 1918, it became the Hotel Edward, and in 1936 the Hotel Lee. Until the 1960s, the ground floor was the location of various retail stores on Granby St., including a People's Drug Store. After a 1983 fire, the building was demolished.

The school's former location on "College Place" is now part of the Norfolk campus of Tidewater Community College.

== Alumna ==
- Kate Langley Bosher (1882), best-selling novelist
