= Huntersville, Norfolk, Virginia =

Neighborhood in Norfolk, Virginia, US

Coordinates: 36°51′49″N 76°16′30″W

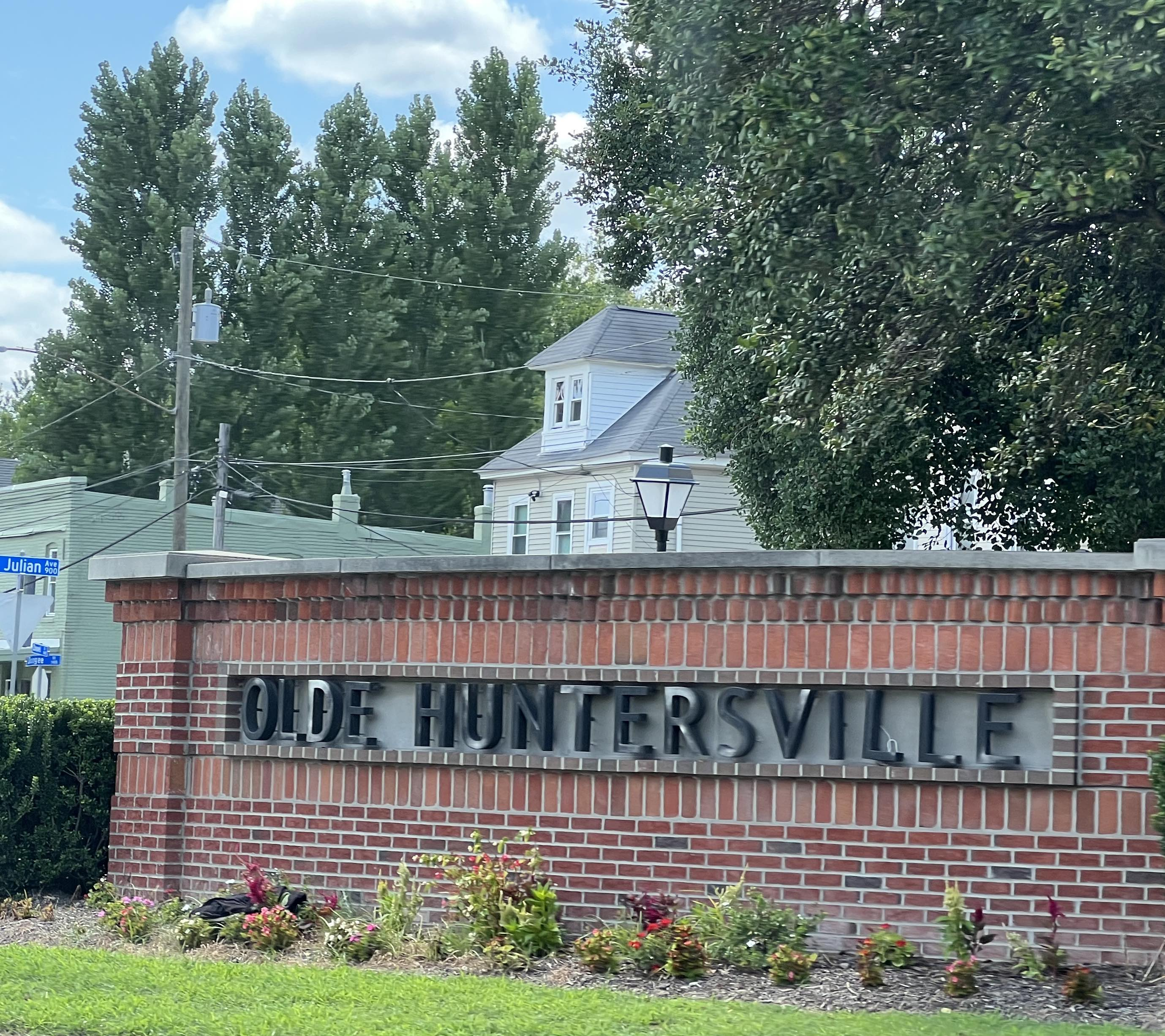
Olde Huntersville, Norfolk, Virginia.

Huntersville is a historic neighborhood in Norfolk, Virginia. It is located near downtown Norfolk. One of Norfolk's "most intact settlements remaining from the late 19th century," Huntersville "is unique because it was not planned by a company or commission, but developed over time."

== Location ==
It is bordered on the west by Church Street and Elmwood Cemetery, the north by the Lindenwood neighborhood, the east by Tidewater Drive, and the south by Huntersville Park and the Barberton neighborhood. More specifically:

The boundaries of the Huntersville Neighborhood is: The northern boundary roughly extends from the intersections of E. 29th Street and Church Street, along Waverly Way, terminating at the Lafayette River. The eastern boundary extends from the Lafayette River to Summit Avenue, along Summit Avenue to the intersection of Summit Avenue and Ludlow Street. It then extends in a southeasterly arc from this point along Rugby, Taggart, and Bolton Streets, to Princess Anne Road. From Princess Anne Road, this boundary extends east to Park Avenue, following Park Avenue to Corprew Avenue. The southern boundary extends west from Corprew Avenue, to Bagnall Road, then northeasterly from the intersections of Chapel Street and Bagnall Road, to the intersection of Tidewater Drive and Princess Anne Road. It then extends roughly to Church and Goff Streets, then to the intersection of Princess Anne Road, and Armistead Avenue. The southern boundary roughly extends north along Armistead Avenue to 22nd Street, from 22nd Street to Church Street, and from Church Street to E. 29th Street.

— City of Norfolk government website

== History ==
Part of Huntersville was land that belonged to Samuel Boush c. 1761. By the end of the 19th century, it "consisted of small frame houses mostly clustered in the area of Church Street." Huntersville is "one of Norfolk's oldest and most intact settlements remaining from the late 19th century," and "is unique because it was not planned by a company or commission, but developed over time."

At various times, there were "a botanical and zoological park named Lesner's Park ... an 'old Burying Ground'," and several industries, including a railroad and a brewery. Most of the land at the turn of the century was owned by Caucasians, which included a few prominent residents, but mostly they rented to a "demographic mix" of native Whites, "European immigrants" of Jewish extraction, Asians, and Blacks. Huntersville was annexed to the city of Norfolk in 1911.

In 1916, a team of canvassers were able to raise $3,500 in donations from the residents of the area in two days, in order to build a hospital, a huge amount for that time.

== Neighborhood character ==
Huntersville is primarily residential in character. According to the official city history, "It was the only predominantly Black neighborhood to be annexed during the more than 70 years of annexation." Today, it is, as it was in the early 20th century, a mixed, "cosmopolitan" neighborhood.

It is served by a city of Norfolk community center. The center provides many social services, including HIV testing, and employment counseling by the Urban League.

The Head Start program has a program in Huntersville.

It appears on some maps as "Olde Huntersville". In 2007, the Olde Huntersville Development Corp. became defunct after owing over $245,000 it had misspent "in violation of federal regulations."

A Pop Warner football league plays regularly at Huntersville park.

The neighborhood has a large number of poor persons who require indigent burials; according to an area funeral home director, it has recently had three such funerals per month.
