= USA Living =

USA Discounters, Ltd.
- Founded: 1991
- Headquarters: Norfolk, Virginia, United States
- Area served: United States
- Website: www.usadiscounters.net

USA Discounters, Ltd. (d/b/a USA Living and Fletcher's Jewelers) was an American retail company based in Norfolk, Virginia, United States. USA Discounters was in business from 1991 to 2015.

== History ==
Collection Practices

In a July 2014 article, it was reported that USA Discounters seizes the pay of more active-duty military than any other company in the country, according to Department of Defense payroll data obtained by ProPublica.

USA Discounters issued a press release refuting the article, stating just "1%" of their military customers are subject to wage garnishment after all other actions are exhausted.

Name change

In October 2014, USA Discounters announced a name change to "USA Living", however the name change was a store branding change only for the "USA Discounters" and "Fletcher's Jewelers" locations and the company's official name remained the same.

Bankruptcy

In August 2015, USA Discounters filed Chapter 11 bankruptcy and began closing stores."

Official investigations

The company has been the target of investigations and official actions by the Consumer Financial Protection Bureau, the Colorado Attorney General, and the North Carolina Attorney General.
