= Fairmount Park, Virginia =

Neighborhood in Norfolk, Virginia, United States

Coordinates: 36.8819°N 76.2568°W

Fairmount Park is a culturally and ethnically diverse neighborhood the City of Norfolk, Virginia. Fairmount Park consists of nine distinct neighborhoods including Fairmount Park, Willard Park, Lafayette Annex, Fairmount Manor, Lafayette Manor, Lafayette Terrace, Belmont Place, Bell's Farm and Kent Park. The neighborhoods are represented by the Fairmount Park Civic League, which represents over 2,300 households and is the second largest Civic League in Norfolk. The Fairmount Park neighborhoods have tree lined streets with a variety of architectural styles, including arts and craft period bungalows, Victorian farmhouses, European Romantic, American Four Squares, and the Norfolk Coastal cottage.

== Facilities ==
Fairmount Park is primarily a residential neighborhood with commercial businesses scattered along Tidewater Drive, Cromwell Drive, Chesapeake Boulevard, and Lafayette Boulevard. Public facilities include the five acre Shoop Park on Shoop Avenue. The park includes basketball courts, a playground, a "splash park" with water jets and a fountain area, picnic shelters, and a volleyball court. An exercise trail with 8 wellness stations along with a walking and running trail surrounds the park.
