= Giant Open Air =

American supermarket chain

Giant Open Air Market was a Norfolk, Virginia-based supermarket chain. Its trademark stores were open 24 hours a day, and the entrance was framed with an arch which rose to over 30 feet, anchored in concrete.

The chain grew to include 26 full-line grocery stores and 43 "Tinee Giant" convenience stores. The stores were known for the vastness of the variety in the selections. The international line of groceries that they carried attracted national press at the time. Giant Open Air Markets would carry exotics like chocolate-covered ants from Japan, pickled eel, English teas, Greek and French cheeses and Russian caviar as well as Latin American foods. The sign over the front door read "Finest Foods of the World", reflecting their diverse selections.

== History ==
=== 1939-1952 ===
The first location was at the foot of the Campostella Bridge in Norfolk's Berkley neighborhood. The market opened in 1939 was operated by business partners Wendall P. Rosso and Vincent. J. Mastracco, Sr. Later, a store was erected on the site in 1952.

=== Growth and eventual acquisition ===
Giant Open Air's flagship store was located in the Ward's Corner section of Norfolk, which opened in 1963. The over-150,000-square-foot Giant Open Air Market also included a large restaurant. There were banquet rooms upstairs that could host a thousand guests and a balcony with a fountain. As a 24-hour store (only closed on Christmas Day) the "front door" was an "air curtain" with no real doors. A blower pushed air down as customers entered and a steel grate below captured the air and recycled it. The grate was always full of loose coins that were cleaned out once a year and donated to charity. The location was also known for massive decorations, such as was a 20-foot fall "waterfall" of ice in the seafood department. The stores had large bakeries that produced fresh bakery 24 hours a day. Other accommodations for shoppers were a large portico to have their groceries loaded into their cars out of the rain, and a 24-hour laundromat. The "House of Flowers" floral department was one of the top ten FTD stores in the country at its time. By late September 1985, the chain (having acquired the 6-store chain LouSmith SuperMarkets) went public.

In 1986 the 26 grocery stores and 43 "Tinee Giant" convenience stores that Giant Open Air Market comprised merged with Farm Fresh, another Hampton Roads grocery chain, and the name disappeared, though the giant arch still remains on the logo.

Joseph A. Vita, former chief executive officer of Farm Fresh Inc., signed an agreement with Farm Fresh to buy its 50-store chain of Tinee Giant convenience stores for an undisclosed amount of money in 1989. Farm Fresh had acquired the stores in 1986 when it merged with the Giant Open Air Markets; Vita was president of Giant Open Air at that time. Most of the Tinee Giant convenience stores were located on the south side; about two dozen of the stores were on the Peninsula. Farm Fresh sold the stores as part of the leveraged buyout agreement with Citicorp Venture Capital Ltd., completed in September 1989. The Tinee Giant convenience store chain still has several locations in Hampton Roads. In 1999, the wholesaler Supervalu purchased the company.
