= Owen B. Pickett United States Custom House =

- U.S. Customhouse
- U.S. National Register of Historic Places
- Virginia Landmarks Register
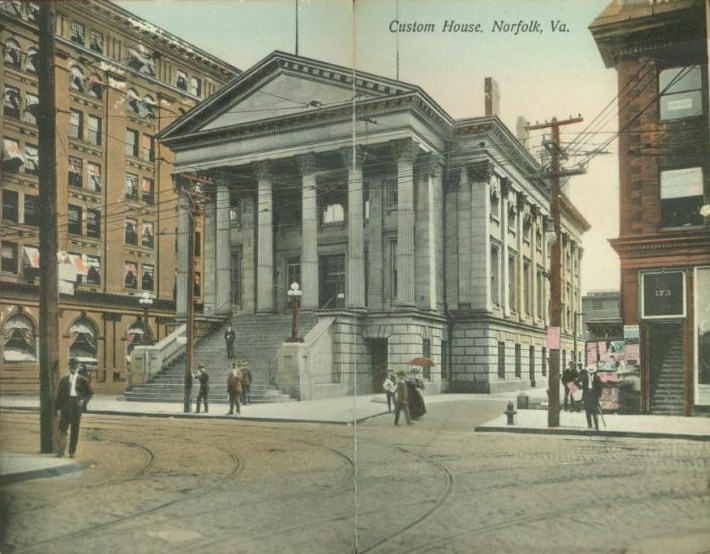
- U.S. Customhouse, ca. 1900

- Location within Virginia Location within the United States
- Location: 101 E. Main St., Norfolk, Virginia
- Coordinates: 36°50′45″N 76°17′34″W
- Area: 9.9 acres (4.0 ha)
- Built: 1852
- Architect: Young, Ammi B.
- Architectural style: Palladian
- NRHP reference No.: 70000901
- VLR No.: 122-0032

Significant dates
- Added to NRHP: April 17, 1970
- Designated VLR: December 2, 1969

The Owen B. Pickett U.S. Custom House is a historic custom house building located at Norfolk, Virginia.

== Building history ==
Located near the waterfront in downtown Norfolk, the Owen B. Pickett U.S. Custom House is a testimony to the importance of commerce and trade in the city. The activities of the Norfolk Customs Service, one of the inaugural Customs offices in the nation, were initially located in various rented quarters until an official U.S. Custom House was completed in 1819.

As early as 1850 plans were developed to replace the first U.S. Custom House with a larger building that could also be used to accommodate the main U.S. Post Office. The history of Norfolk's present U.S. Custom House began when the U.S. Congress authorized funds for the construction of the building in 1850. A prominent site in downtown Norfolk at Main and Granby Streets was purchased in 1852 for $13,500. Supervising Architect of the Treasury Ammi B. Young (1798–1874) produced a design based on precepts of classical Roman architecture. Historians of the period anticipated that when completed, the U.S. Custom House "was to be one of the most imposing and showy buildings in the city." Construction began in 1853 with John H. Sale serving as construction superintendent for the U.S. Treasury Department. The Post Office moved into its new quarters in 1857, though the building was only partially finished. The cost of the building upon completion in 1858 was reported to have reached $204,000, almost twice the original estimate.

With the exception of a brief period of Confederate occupation (April 1861 to May 1862), this building has housed the U.S. Customs Service for over 135 years. The Roman Temple form and the continued presence of the Customs Service in this building are constant reminders of the city's long and vital history in the pursuit of world trade.

In 1970 the U.S. Custom House in Norfolk was listed in the National Register of Historic Places. In 2001, the building received a Norfolk Design Award and was renamed in honor of U.S. Representative Owen B. Pickett of Virginia.

In 2025 the U.S. Custom House in Norfolk was listed in the General Services Administration Non-Core Property List for disposal.

== Architecture ==
The Owen B. Pickett U.S. Custom House is one of the last examples of a federal building using the Roman temple form. Monumental in scale, the rectangular block stands three stories in height. It is constructed of granite from Blue Hill, Maine, rusticated at the ground floor with smooth ashlar on the upper two floors.

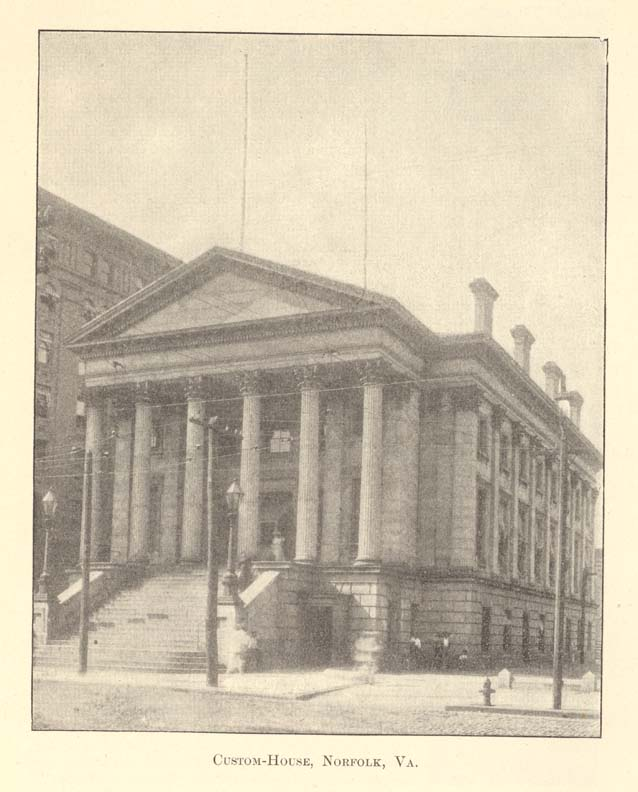
U.S. Custom House

The primary facade of the building displays the high-style characteristics of Roman architecture with sweeping steps leading to the pedimented portico. The two-story portico, capped by an enclosed pediment with modillions, is composed of six full-height, fluted granite columns, each capped by cast-iron capitals designed in the Corinthian order. Centered under the projecting portico is a pair of entrance doors flanked by elongated windows embellished with granite surrounds. Single-leaf entry doors at the corners of the ground floor were originally designed as separate male and female entrances to the Post Office lobby. Window openings, placed between the strong vertical forms of the Corinthian pilasters, pierce the symmetrically fenestrated side elevations of the building. The openings are embellished with molded granite surrounds, pedimented lintels, flat arches, and bracketed sills. The building is richly adorned by a classically inspired cast-iron entablature with frieze, modillions, and molded cornice.

Cast-iron columns, girders, and beams form the interior structural system of the U.S. Custom House. Brick arches support the spaces between the girders. Square columns are integrated with wood stud partitions and finished with plaster. Cast-iron-detailed capitals are ornamented with a simplified leaf motif derived from the Corinthian order modified to incorporate the Virginia tobacco leaf as a prominent feature. A ten-foot-wide corridor with original ceramic tile flooring begins at the main entrance and runs the entire length of the building, terminating at the main stair at the south end. The cast-iron circular stair with ornamental open risers has a wrought-iron balustrade and mahogany handrail.

On October 22, 1858, The Southern Argus reported that the nearly completed U.S. Custom House was designed with "large, airy [rooms], admirably planned and furnished with a view to good taste and convenience; indeed the arrangements are all in accordance with a superior plan, and the workmanship is faithfully executed." Offices flank the main corridors of both the first and second floors. Original features extant throughout the Custom House include marble tile flooring in the corridors, plaster walls, vaulted ceilings, fireplaces, and wood flooring in the offices.

Since the completion of the U.S. Custom House in 1858, various alterations have been made. Between 1901 and 1912, the Office of the Supervising Architect under James Knox Taylor oversaw alterations including the installation of new double-hung wood sash windows. A single-story addition at the rear of the building, constructed in 1935 under the direction of the Office of the Supervising Architect under James A. Wetmore, continues the original design in style, scale, and finish. The rusticated limestone masonry of the addition continues the coursing and rhythm of the original building, although the interiors are more modest in detailing.

The custom house was closed between 1996 and 2000 for a renovation project costing $3 million.

== Significant events ==
- 1850: The U.S. Congress authorizes funds for the construction of anew U.S. Custom House in Norfolk.
- 1852: The site is purchased and construction begins under the direction of Supervising Architect Ammi B. Young.
- 1858: Construction of the U.S. Custom House is completed.
- 1861-1862: The U.S. Custom House is occupied by the Confederate States of America.
- 1901-1912: Alterations are made under the direction of James Knox Taylor, Supervising Architect of the Treasury.
- 1935: An addition to the rear of the building is designed under the administration of Supervising Architect James A. Wetmore.
- 1970: The U.S. Custom House is listed in National Register of Historic Places.
- 1996-1999: The building undergoes rehabilitation and restoration.
- 2001: The building receives a Norfolk Design Award and is renamed in honor of U.S. Representative Owen B. Pickett of Virginia.

== Building facts ==
- Architect: Ammi B. Young, Supervising Architect of the Treasury
- Construction Dates: 1852-1858
- Landmark Status: Listed in the National Register of Historic Places
- Location: 101 East Main Street
- Architectural Style: Classical Revival
- Primary Materials: Gray granite
- Prominent Features: Portico interior columns with tobacco leaf motif capitals
