= Monticello Arcade =

Historic commercial building in Virginia, United States

- U.S. National Register of Historic Places
- Virginia Landmarks Register
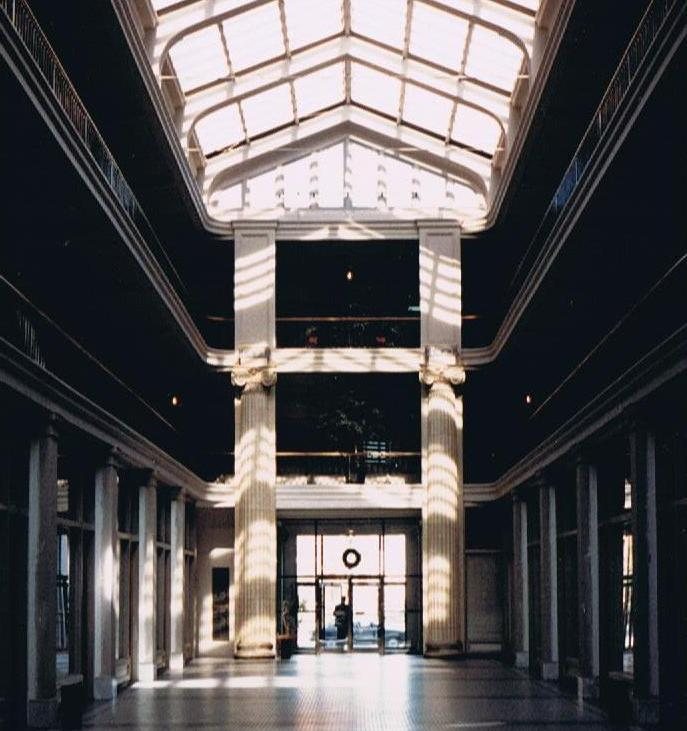
- Monticello Arcade interior, ca 1986

- Location within Virginia Location within the United States
- Location: In 200 block E. City Hall Ave.; between City Hall Ave. and Plume St., Norfolk, Virginia
- Coordinates: 36°50′50″N 76°17′27″W
- Area: less than one acre
- Built: 1907
- Architectural style: Beaux Arts
- NRHP reference No.: 75002115
- VLR No.: 122-0066

Significant dates
- Added to NRHP: May 21, 1975
- Designated VLR: April 15, 1975

Monticello Arcade is a historic shopping arcade located in Norfolk, Virginia. It was built in 1907 on land leased from the Selden Grandy Estate, and is a three-story, Beaux Arts style steel frame building faced in molded and polychromed terra cotta. Both the facades are seven bays in length and are composed of a two-story Ionic order surmounted by an elaborate cornice, with an attic story above. The interior plan consists of a longitudinal mall open to the roof, lit by skylights, and entered through the central bay of each facade.

== History ==
In the early 20th century, business boomed in the Arcade as downtown Norfolk's commercial area expanded until the Great Depression, at which time Monticello Arcade Company, Inc. filed for bankruptcy and the building returned to the Grandy Estate. The Arcade survived the remainder of the Depression in the hands of its new owners and went on to prosper in postwar Norfolk. Businesses in the downtown area began to suffer in the early 1960s, and during that time the Monticello Arcade began to deteriorate as revenues decreased. By the 1970s, the Arcade was in poor condition with only a few remaining tenants. Threat of condemnation loomed until 1975, when the building attained landmark status. In 1976, management of the Arcade was taken over by the newly created Monticello Arcade Limited Partnership. By the early 1980s, downtown Norfolk had been significantly restored, which resulted in recovery of Arcade business. Today the Monticello Arcade remains at the heart of Norfolk's business and retail district.

It was listed on the National Register of Historic Places in 1975.
