= Monticello Hotel (Norfolk, Virginia) =

Hotel in Norfolk, Virginia

Coordinates: 36°50.882′N 76°17.475′W

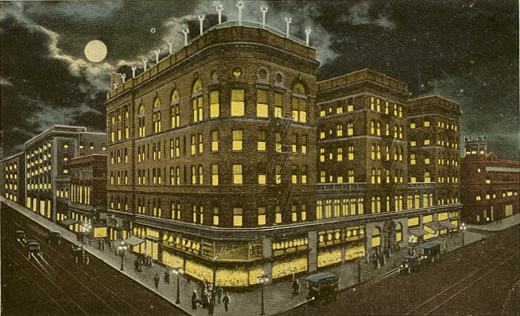
- Postcard of the original Monticello Hotel
- Interactive map of the Monticello Hotel area

General information
- Type: Hotel
- Location: Norfolk, Virginia., U.S.
- Opened: 1898
- Renovated: 1919
- Demolished: 1976

The Monticello Hotel was an historic hotel built in 1898 on Monticello Avenue in Norfolk, Virginia. The original hotel was destroyed by a fire on New Year's Day in 1918, a day so cold that the water from the fire equipment froze before it could reach the fire. The hotel was rebuilt in 1919, with two additional stories added, and operated until it was demolished in 1976 as part of Norfolk's ongoing urban renewal project.

The Norfolk Federal Building currently sits on the old Monticello Hotel site.

== Historical gallery ==
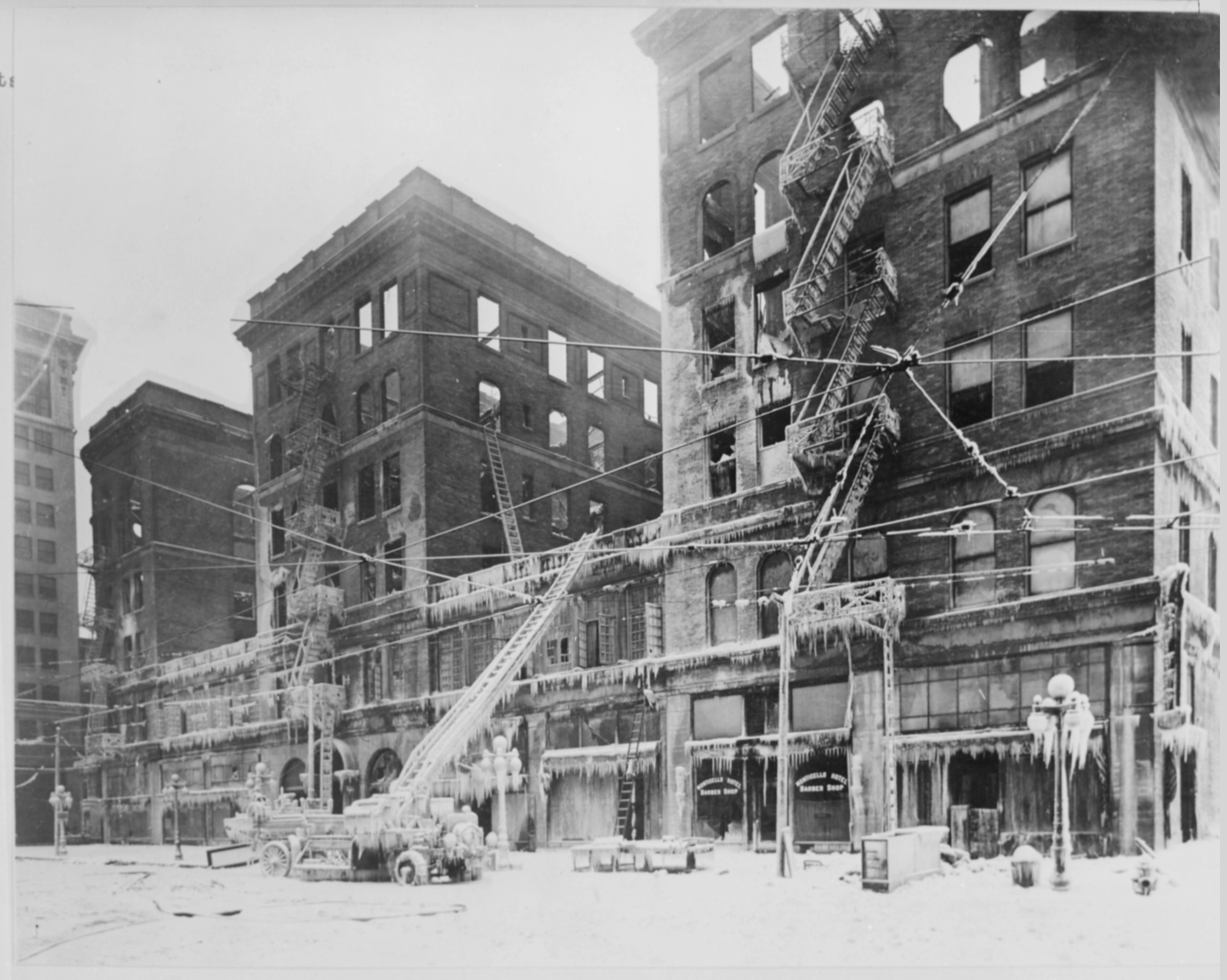
After the fire that destroyed the original hotel in 1918.

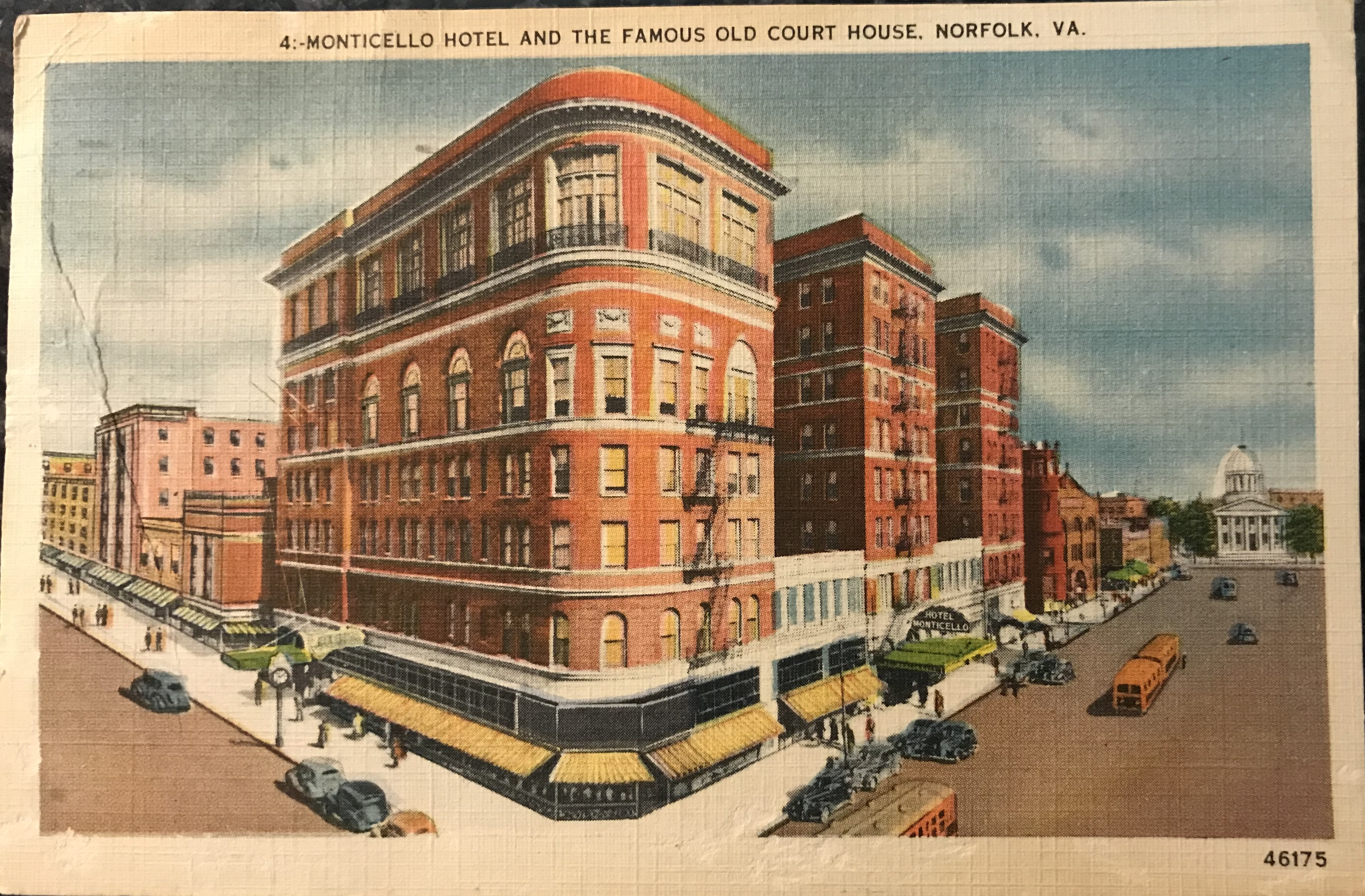
The rebuilt Monticello Hotel with the extra stories

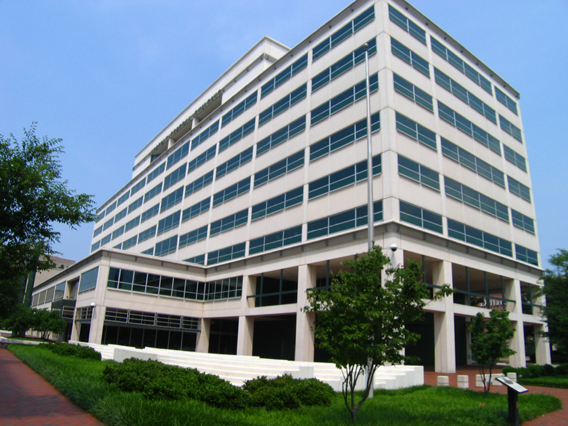
The site of the hotel today.
