= Mercury Boulevard =

Commercial corridor in Virginia, USA

- Location within Virginia
- Former name: Military Highway
- Namesake: Project Mercury
- Length: 10 miles (16 km)
- Location: Hampton and Newport News, Virginia, US
- Coordinates: 37°2′29.9″N 76°23′18.6″W
- North end: Fort Monroe at Old Point Comfort
- South end: North end of James River Bridge

Mercury Boulevard in the cities of Hampton and Newport News in the Peninsula region of southeastern Virginia carries U.S. Route 258 (US 258) approximately 10 miles (16 km) south from Fort Monroe at Old Point Comfort on Hampton Roads to the north end of the James River Bridge. Mercury Boulevard is a major north-south commercial corridor in the region, and has an interchange with Interstate 64 (I-64) in an elaborate interchange with flyovers in Hampton near the Hampton Coliseum.

== History: two "military highways" ==
As originally built, the road was earlier known as "Military Highway", a name it shared with another roadway in South Hampton Roads which was built beginning in 1943. Both roads, which utilized limited access designs, initially featured adjacent service roads. Each also featured several major traffic circles in the second half of the 20th century. These were later replaced with more modern designs with additional lanes and electronic traffic signaling. The roadway near Norfolk also featured one of Virginia's first cloverleaf interchanges and overpass designs, near the future site of JANAF Shopping Center, the largest on the east coast when it opened.

The roadway in Hampton and Newport News (which has never connected directly with the "other" Military Highway) was later renamed to honor the Project Mercury space program of NASA's Langley Research Center which is located adjacent to, and shares a runway with Langley Air Force Base. It also was the location of several major shopping centers, including the Newmarket South Shopping Center (1956), the Mercury Plaza Mall (1967), the Newmarket North Mall (1975), and the Coliseum Mall (1973), which was rebuilt and reopened in 2010 as Peninsula Town Center.

Substantial sections of the other road, which continues to be known as Military Highway, and which circumvented the independent cities of Norfolk and Portsmouth, are still in use.
