= Peninsula Town Center =

- Location: Hampton, Virginia, United States
- Coordinates: 37°2′39.2″N 76°23′35.9″W
- Opened: 1973 (original mall) 2009 (current outdoor shopp)
- Closed: 2007 (original mall)
- Owner: The Tabani Group
- Num. of stores: 100+
- Num. of anchor tenants: 4
- Floor area: 1,100,000 sq ft (100,000 m^{2})
- Floors: 1-2(shopping) 3-4(apartments and parking garage)
- Parking: 4,402
- Public transit: Hampton Roads Transit Routes 102, 105, 114 and 118
- Website: peninsulatowncenter.com

Peninsula Town Center is an open air mixed-use development located in the Coliseum Central Business improvement district of Hampton, Virginia in the Hampton Roads region. The Town Center is located on the site of the original Coliseum Mall, an enclosed facility constructed in 1973 by Mall Properties Inc. of New York, its only owner. At 991,000-square feet (876,000 retail, 115,000 office), Peninsula Town Center is the largest redevelopment project in Hampton's history. Mall Properties has teamed with Steiner + Associates, which developed Easton Town Center in Columbus; Zona Rosa in Kansas City; The Greene Town Center near Dayton; and Bayshore Town Center near Milwaukee to create Peninsula Town Center.

Peninsula Town Center has a mix of department and specialty retailers and restaurants, as well as commercial office and residential space above stores on some buildings. There are also several landscaped parks, plazas and squares and 4,402 parking spaces in surface and structured lots as well as on-street.

== History ==
Coliseum Mall was built in 1973, as a commercial centerpiece of Hampton's Mercury Boulevard-Coliseum Central district and still remains the largest single tax source within the city. Coliseum opened with three anchors: E. J. Korvette, JCPenney, and Nachman's. The center was the largest and busiest shopping area on the Virginia Peninsula as it opened on October 31, 1973, until Newmarket North Mall opened in 1975 with Sears, Leggett, and Miller & Rhoads which had moved from its original location across the street at the original Newmarket Shopping Center.

The Coliseum Mall was expanded in 1976, adding Norfolk-based Smith & Welton and Richmond-based Thalhimers. The Smith & Welton location was later a Children's Palace toy store.

In 1980 E. J. Korvette declared bankruptcy and closed all its locations. The Coliseum location was left vacant until major tenant Montgomery Ward acquired the space. Ward had moved from the adjacent Mercury Plaza Mall which was converted into an open-air shopping center. The company's Auto Center remained at Mercury.

In 1987, Crown American and the City of Newport News built and developed the competitive Patrick Henry Mall, and later surrounding "big-box" shopping centers sprouted around the mall during the 1990s. Since then the city's Oyster Point/Patrick Henry district has experienced substantial growth, making commercial retail challenging for the Coliseum Central district of Hampton.

Until the last several years, Coliseum existed, though did not really keep up with changing times. The Nachman's became Hess's, then Proffitt's, then Dillard's, which also opened an auxiliary store in the former Children's Palace. Thalhimers became Hecht's in 1993 and Macy's in 2006.

Both of the Dillard's stores closed in 2003. The same year, a portion of the mall was set aside to accommodate a Burlington Coat Factory store. Burlington Coat Factory instead opened in the former Montgomery Ward building, and a short-lived Steve & Barry's opened in the slot originally slated for Burlington Coat Factory.

== Redevelopment ==
On January 14, 2007, Coliseum Mall permanently closed its doors to prepare for demolition in late February 2007. The mall was redeveloped as an open-air center, anchored by the existing Macy's and JCPenney, along with a new Target store.

On January 7, 2016; Macy's announced three Hampton Roads locations, including the one at Peninsula Town Center, would close as part of a series of 40 locations being closed in early 2016.
