= Norvella Heights =

Human settlement in Norfolk, Virginia, United States of America

Coordinates: 36°53′26.53″N 76°13′33.78″W

Norvella Heights is a neighborhood in the eastern portion of the Norview district of Norfolk, Virginia. Many of the homes that reside in this area were built in the 1950s and are, for the most part, one floor homes with crawlspaces. During the construction of I-64 in Norfolk, the neighborhood was split in two, and I-64 now forms the border between East Norview and West Norview. The neighborhood is also bound by Military Highway, Azalea Garden Road, and Norview Avenue. Currently, this subdivision is home to a high concentration of military personnel, primarily due to its proximity to the Norview Avenue interchange with I-64, therefore facilitating easy access to Naval Station Norfolk. At a previous time, there was a large warehouse-type building located in the neighborhood, a blight on Norvella Avenue and on Vivian Street. During the mid-2000s, the warehouse was razed, and new, larger homes were built in the area. In addition, this neighborhood is prone to flooding along Norvella Avenue, and, more frequently, along Texas Avenue and towards the part of the subdivision that is bounded by Azalea Garden Road.
