= Chesapeake Square =

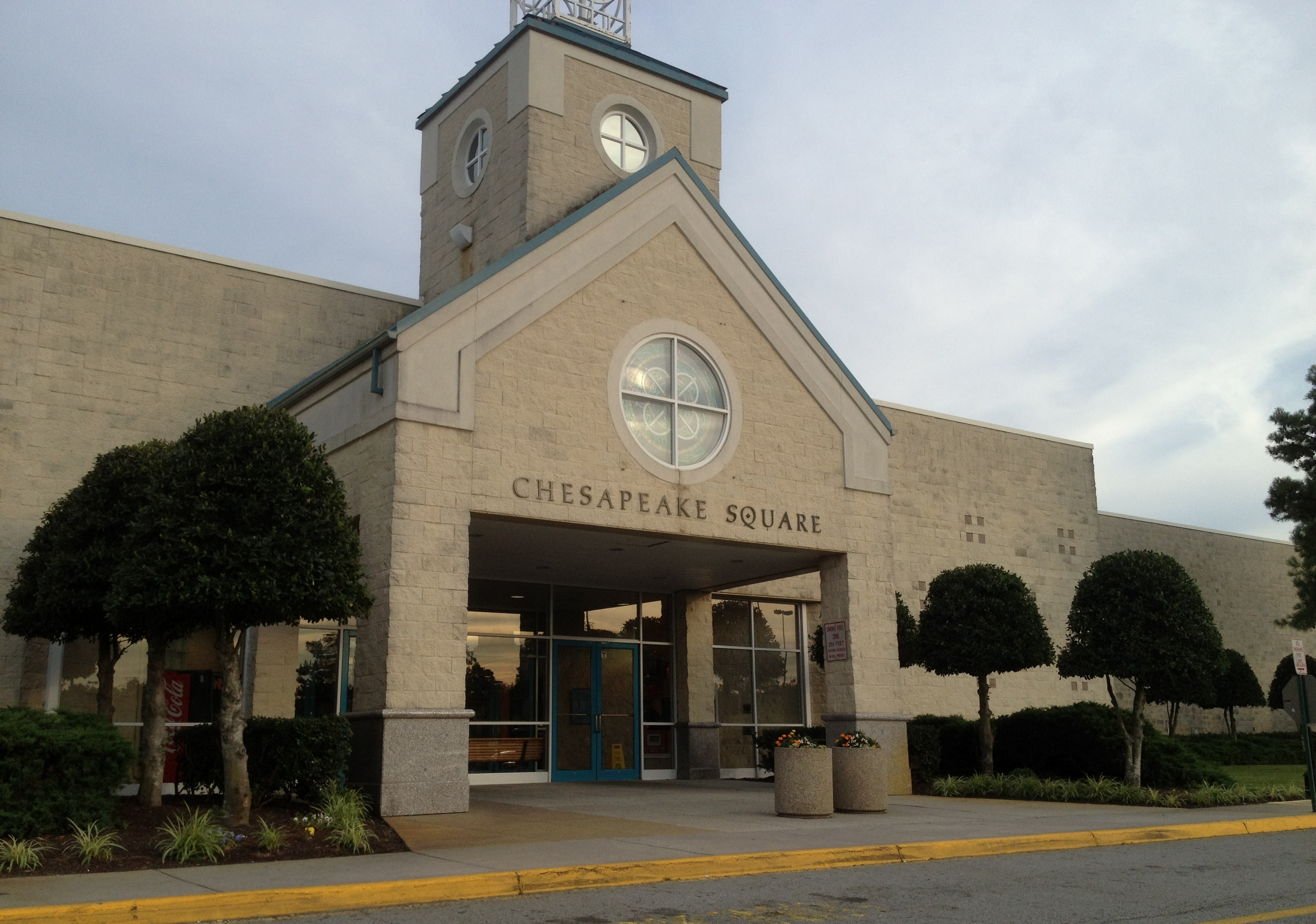
- Entrance to Chesapeake Square, June 2012
- Location: Chesapeake, Virginia
- Coordinates: 36°49′36.3″N 76°24′52.8″W
- Opened: 1989
- Developer: Edward J. DeBartolo Corporation
- Owner: Kotarides Holdings, LLC.
- Num. of stores: 76
- Num. of anchor tenants: 6 (2 open, 4 vacant/demolished)
- Floor area: 717,282 square feet (66,637.7 m^{2})
- Floors: 1
- Parking: 2,000
- Website: chesapeakesquare.com

Chesapeake Square is a regional mall in Chesapeake, Virginia, in the Hampton Roads metropolitan area. The mall had at its peak approximately over 70 stores at its peak, with space for up to six anchor stores. Cinemark Theatres, Target, and part of the mall's indoor concourse still remains open through redevelopment plans.

== History ==
The mall was developed by the Edward J. DeBartolo Corporation. The mall opened in October 1989 in former forest and swamp land of the Western Branch portion of Chesapeake, Virginia. The mall's anchors at the time of its opening in 1989 were JCPenney, Sears, Hess's, and Leggett. Montgomery Ward opened in early August 1992. Hecht's opened as an anchor in 1999.

Hecht's became Macy's, along with all other of the chain's stores, in 2006. On July 27, 2009, Dillard's announced that it would close its two Chesapeake Square locations, along with four other undisclosed locations, laying off or transferring 45 employees. In September 2009, both the Men's and women's buildings shuttered.

Burlington Coat Factory replaced Dillard's Men's on September 24, 2010.On November 12, 2010, a Cinemark movie theater moved to the former Dillard's Women. The theater has stadium seating with twelve screens, including an Extreme Digital (XD) auditorium and opened at December 16, 2011.

Sears announced the closure of its Chesapeake Square store in late 2014.In 2014, the malls owner, Simon Property Group announced the spin-off of numerous properties to a newly formed subsidiary, Washington Prime Group. In September 2015, Macy's was announced to close by early 2016. Leaving JCPenney as the last anchor original to the property. Jones Lang LaSalle owned and managed the property until Virginia Beach-based Kotarides acquired the mall for $12.9 million in February 2018.

In October 2021, it was announced that JCPenney would be leaving the mall by 2022. On December 9, 2022, Pete Kortarides, President of Virginia Beach-based Kortarides Development, said demolition of the former Macy's, JCPenney and Sears buildings could begin the next year and be replaced by unnamed retailers. In 2023, Burlington Coat Factory closed. On April 7, 2025, crews from Norfolk-based RC Demolition began the task of taking down the former department store spaces at the mall as part of a major redevelopment effort. Plans call for a grocery store and sporting goods store to anchor a new retail development on the sites of the former Burlington Coat Factory, JCPenney, and Macy's according to a flyer from Cushman & Wakefield | Thalhimer. Expected to be completed by Fall of 2026.
