= NetCenter =

Business center in Hampton, Virginia

Coordinates: 37.025134°N 76.439644°W

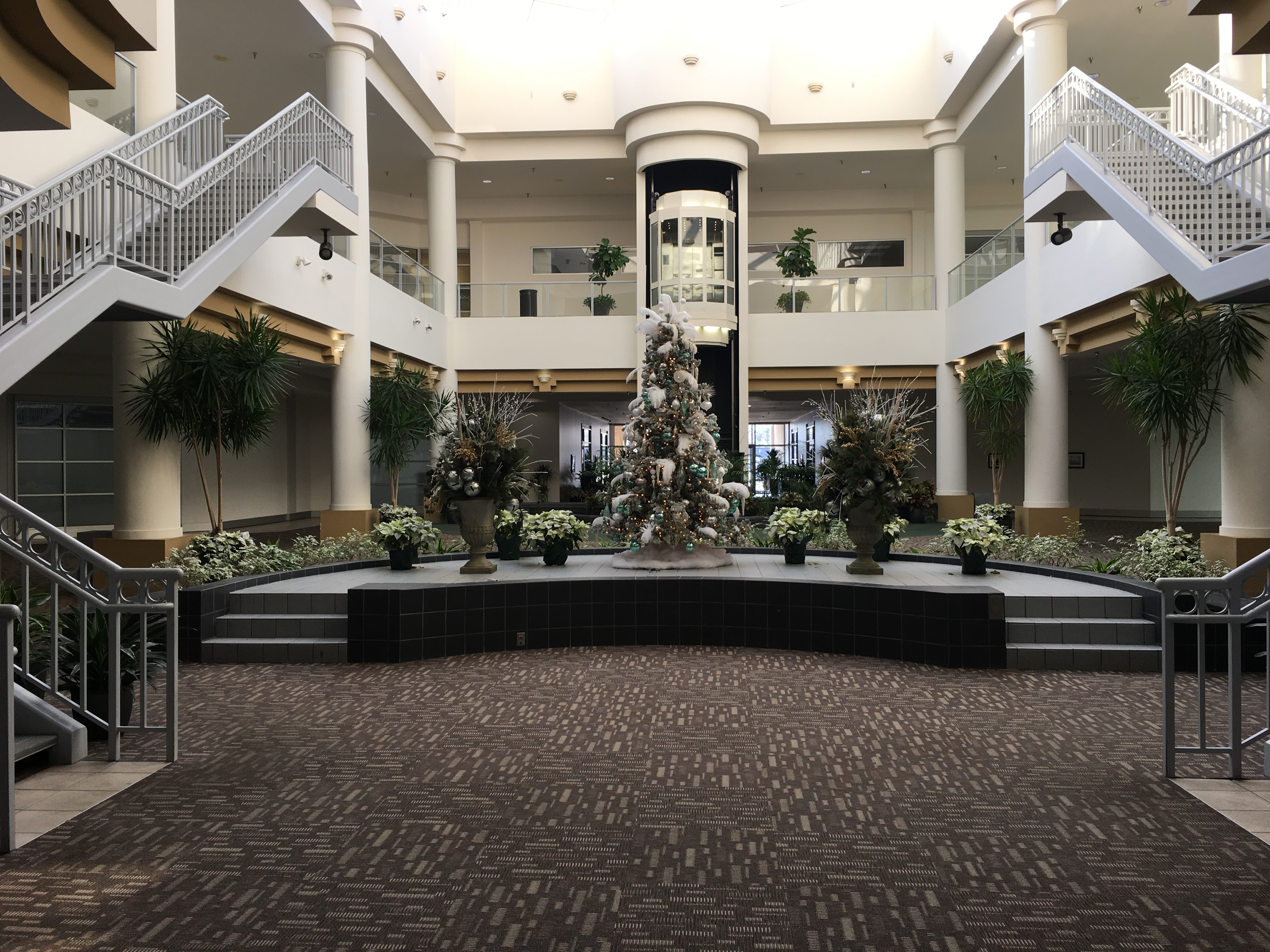
The interior of NetCenter in front of the original mall elevator.

Netcenter, located in the independent city of Hampton, Virginia, is a former shopping mall redeveloped beginning in 2000 and converted into a business center with supporting retail, personal services and food service amenities. It was the first of its kind in the Hampton Roads region.

== History ==
The Newmarket North Mall opened in 1975. In 1989, Goodman Segar Hogan bought the property and began a two-year, $9 million renovation and expansion project. In 1990, when the renovation was nearly complete, the mall was renamed "Newmarket Fair."

Due to Patrick Henry Mall's opening in bordering Newport News, Virginia, in 1987, Newmarket Fair languished. It was apparent that the area was overbuilt with shopping malls.

In 2000, Washington, D.C.–based companies Netcenter Partners and Hampton Partners purchased the 900,000-square-foot (84,000 m^{2}) property on 53 acres (210,000 m^{2}) and converted it into a business center with supporting retail, personal services and food service amenities. It is located within a Virginia Enterprise Zone and a locally designated technology zone.

Netcenter was fashioned after a similar mall conversion in Tampa, Florida. It offers flexible floor plans, state-of-the-art communications, 24-hour access and retail support amenities. The project is situated on a 52-acre (210,000 m^{2}) campus with 4,000 parking spaces and can accommodate office space for more than 4,000 workers.
