= Inside Business (newspaper) =

Weekly newspaper published in Norfolk, Virginia

- Type: Weekly newspaper
- Format: Tabloid
- Owner(s): Tronc
- Publisher: Mike Herron
- Editor: Ron Crow
- Founded: 1995
- Headquarters: 150 West Brambleton Ave. Norfolk, Virginia 23510
- Country: United States
- Website: insidebiz.com

Inside Business is a weekly newspaper serving Norfolk, Virginia and the Hampton Roads area. Its articles focus on the regional business community. Inside Business was formerly known as The Hampton Roads Business Journal, and is published by Pilot Targeted Media, a division of The Virginian-Pilot.
