= Rivers Casino Portsmouth =

Casino in Virginia, United States

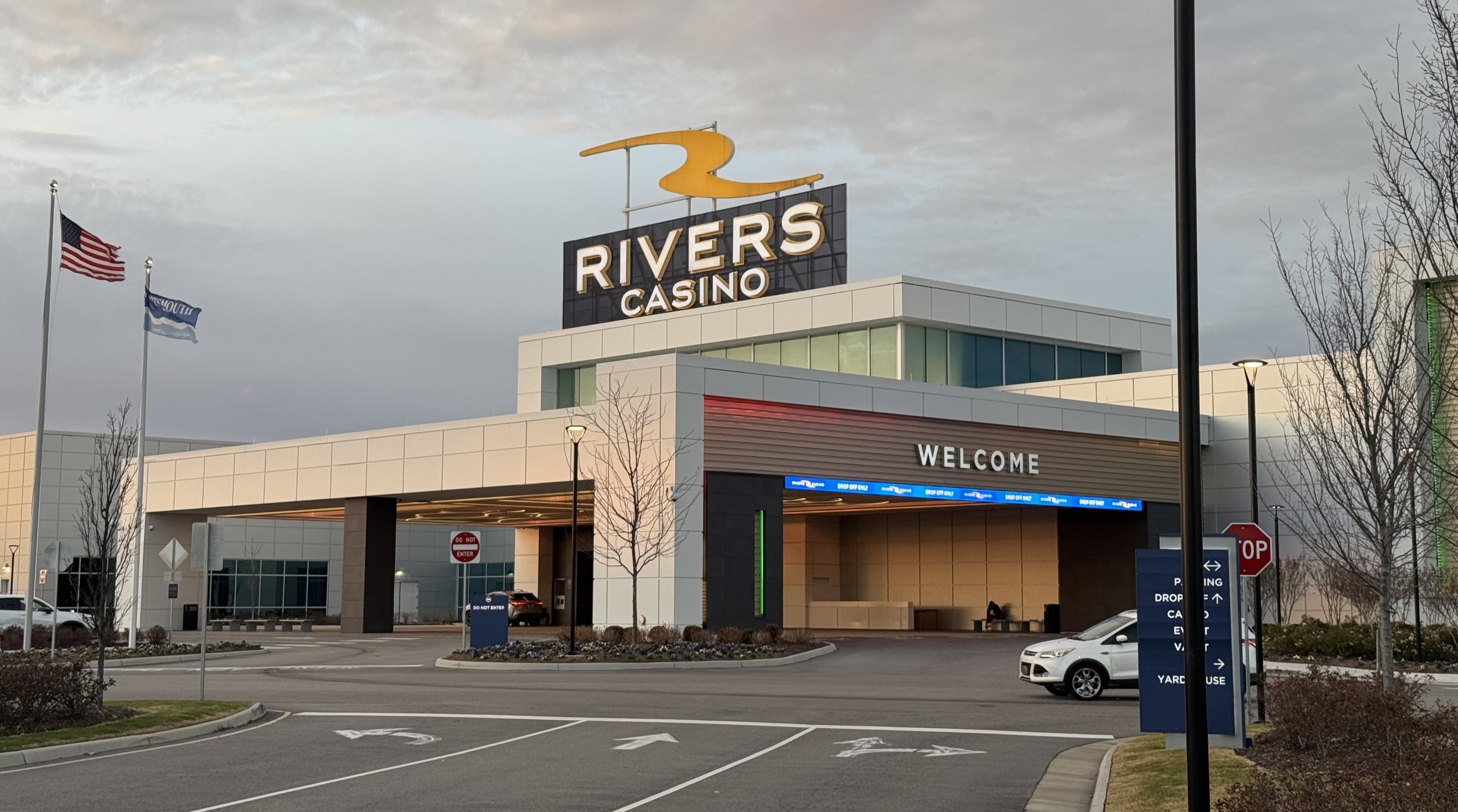
- Interactive map of Rivers Casino Portsmouth
- Location: Portsmouth, Virginia; 3630 Victory Boulevard; 36°48′26″N 76°21′14″W
- Opened: January 23, 2023
- Gaming space: 50,000 sq ft (4,600 m^{2})
- Casino type: Land-based
- Owner: Rush Street Gaming
- Architect: Klai Juba Wald
- Website: Official site

Rivers Casino Portsmouth is a casino located in the Hampton Roads city of Portsmouth, Virginia, adjacent to the Tidewater Community College - Portsmouth Campus. Owned by Rush Street Gaming, it opened on January 23, 2023, becoming Virginia's first full-service permanent casino.

== History ==
In 2020, Virginia legislators passed a bill allowing the establishment of casinos, but limited the option to five eligible host cities: Portsmouth, Richmond, Norfolk, Danville, and Bristol. An additional condition was set that each city must hold a referendum on the question of whether to allow casino gaming in the city.

In 2019, the city of Portsmouth began seeking proposals of a possible casino for the area. In November 2019, the Portsmouth City Council gave approval to Rush Street Gaming's proposed $330 million casino and mixed-use development on a 50-acre (20 ha) site, located adjacent to Tidewater Community College. In November 2020, Portsmouth voters approved the casino referendum, with 29,169 voting Yes (67%) to 14,530 voting No (33%). Construction on Rivers Casino Portsmouth began on December 7, 2021. In November 2022, the Virginia Lottery Board issued a facility operator's license to Portsmouth Rivers Casino to operate Virginia's second casino, the first being awarded in April to Hard Rock Hotel & Casino Bristol. On January 23, 2023, the Rivers Casino Portsmouth officially opened, becoming the second casino operating in Virginia and the first in a permanent facility.

Original plans also included a hotel, but this was not included when construction began for the casino. Rush Street Gaming has commented that they are committed to building a hotel, but have no timetable when that will happen.

On January 30, 2023, Rivers Casino Portsmouth changed its smoking policy after significant feedback from guests and the community. The new policy makes half of the gaming floor inside the main casino area nonsmoking. Both table games and slot games will be included in both smoking and nonsmoking sections. Entertainment amenities and restaurants were already nonsmoking; while cigars, vaping, and marijuana were prohibited.

In May 2023, Rivers Casino Portsmouth became the first casino fined by Virginia Lottery, who are responsible for regulating casinos in the commonwealth. Virginia Lottery officials said alleged violations were brought to the state's attention in January and February, and is related to "underage and voluntarily excluded persons, licensing requirements relating to slot machines and unauthorized games in play." Rivers Casino Portsmouth agreed to pay a settlement of $275,000, which goes directly to the Commonwealth's General Fund.

== Facility ==
The 50,000-square-foot (4,600 m^{2}) casino floor features approximately 1,448 slot machines, 57 table games, 24 poker tables, and a Sportsbook. Entertainment amenities include a 3,000-seat event center, Topgolf Swing Suite, and the Sound Bar, which includes a dance floor and features live local acts. Dining options include: Admiral's Steak & Seafood, Crossings Café (American), Mian (Asian), Slice Pizzeria, Starbucks, and Yard House (sports bar).
