= Hampton Roads Executive Airport =

Coordinates: 36°46′49″N 076°26′56″W

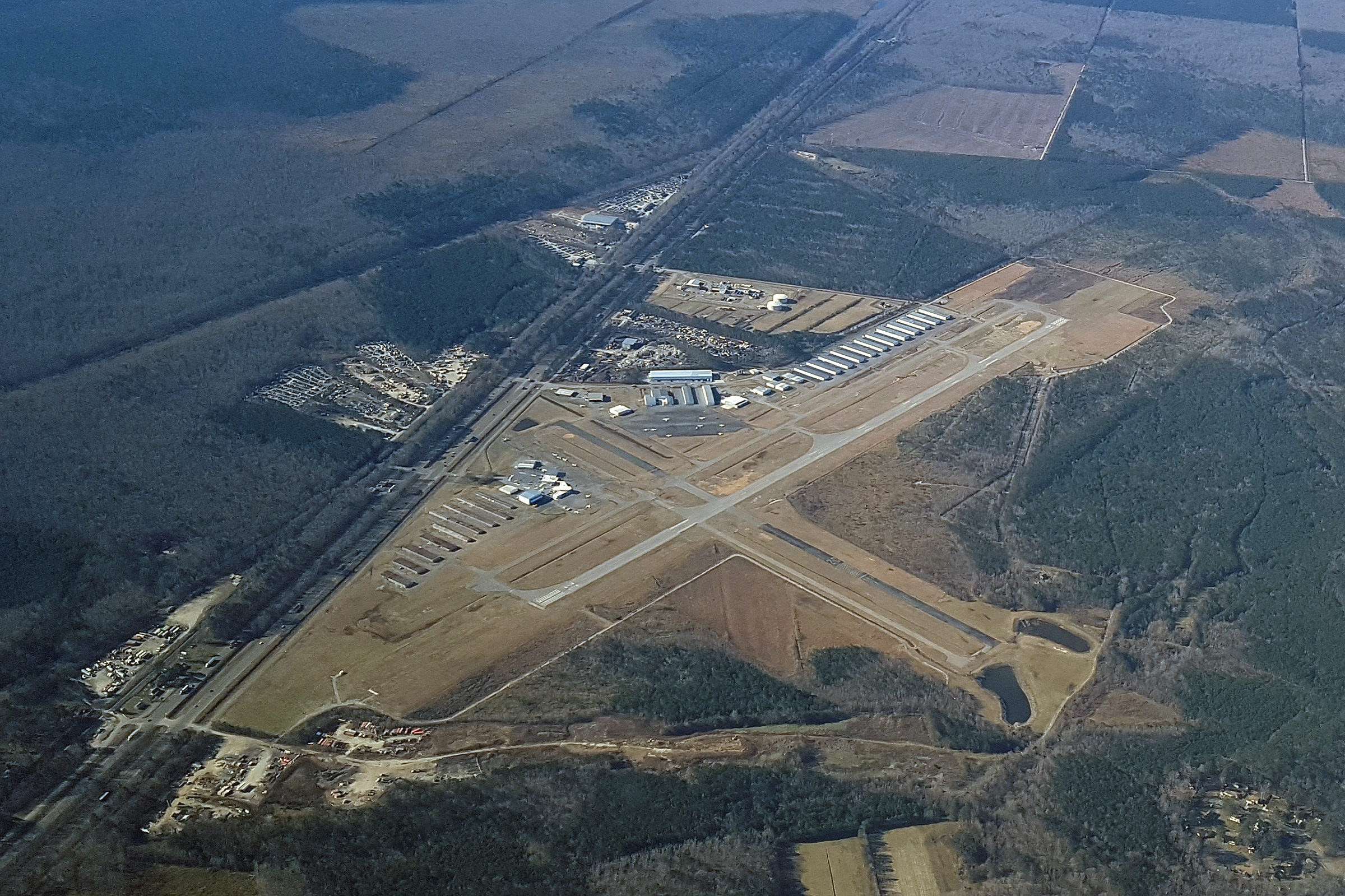
- IATA: QNV; ICAO: KPVG; FAA LID: PVG

Summary
- Airport type: Public
- Owner: Virginia Aviation Associates, L.L.C
- Serves: Norfolk, Virginia
- Elevation AMSL: 23 ft / 7 m

Map

Runways
Direction	Length		Surface
Direction	ft	m	Surface
10/28	4,056	1,236	Asphalt
2/20	3,524	1,074	Asphalt

Statistics (2004)
- Aircraft operations: 86,805
- Based aircraft: 203
- Source: FAA Airport Master Record

Hampton Roads Executive Airport (ICAO: KPVG, FAA LID: PVG) is a public-use airport seven miles (11 km) southwest of Norfolk and northwest of Chesapeake, Virginia. It is privately owned by Virginia Aviation Associates, L.L.C.

Most U.S. airports use the same three-letter location identifier for the FAA and IATA, but Hampton Roads Executive Airport is PVG to the FAA and QNV by the IATA (IATA assigned PVG to Shanghai Pudong International Airport in China).

== Facilities ==
The airport covers 511 acres (207 ha) and has, after an extension completed in 2014, two asphalt runways: 10/28 is 5,350 ft × 100 ft (1,631 m × 30 m) and 2/20 is 3,600 ft × 70 ft (1,097 m × 21 m).

In 2004 the airport had 86,805 aircraft operations, average 237 per day: 97% general aviation, 2% air taxi and <1% military. 203 aircraft were based at this airport: 73% single engine, 14% multi-engine, 8% helicopters and 4% ultralights.
