= Victory Crossing =

Shopping mall in the United States

Coordinates: 36°48′40″N 76°21′20″W

- Location: Portsmouth, Virginia, USA
- Opened: 1973
- Closed: 2001

Victory Crossing, formerly Tower Mall, was a shopping mall located in Portsmouth, Virginia. The shopping mall opened in 1973. The mall's original primary anchors were Bradlees (originally J.M. Fields) and Montgomery Ward. It also had some of the most popular mall chains of the 1970s and 1980s including Orange Bowl and Merry Go Round. Primary anchors left the mall vacant by the mid-1990s. The mall was 600,000 sq ft (56,000 m^{2}) on a 53 acres (21 ha) site. The building was demolished in 2001, to make way for a big-box shopping center. Victory Crossing shopping center currently occupies the site of the former Tower Mall.
