= Newmarket North Mall =

Former mall in Hampton, Virginia

Coordinates: 37°1′30.2″N 76°26′23″W

Newmarket North Mall was a shopping mall located in Hampton, Virginia, that was developed by The Hahn Company and opened in 1975. Its three anchors were Leggett, Miller & Rhoads, and Sears.

In 1989, Goodman Segar Hogan bought the property and began a two-year, $9 million renovation and expansion project. In 1990, when the renovation was nearly complete, the mall was renamed "Newmarket Fair."

Due to Patrick Henry Mall's opening in bordering Newport News, Virginia, in 1987, Newmarket Fair languished, leaving Sears, which was among 235 properties Sears Holdings spun off in 2015 into Seritage Growth Properties, as the only remaining retail anchor tenant. However, on October 15, 2018, this location was announced as one of a number of stores closing as part of the Chapter 11 bankruptcy protection filing by Sears Holdings. The store ultimately closed on January 6, 2019. There is one remaining retail establishment left, Piccadilly Cafeteria, which is the only remaining Piccadilly in Virginia.

In 2000, Washington, D.C.–based companies NetCenter Partners and Hampton Partners purchased the 900,000-square-foot (84,000 m^{2}) property on 53 acres (210,000 m^{2}) and converted it into a business center with supporting retail, personal services and food service amenities called NetCenter.
