= Mercury Plaza Mall =

- Location: Hampton, Virginia, United States
- Opened: 1967
- Closed: 1987
- Num. of stores: 10
- Num. of anchor tenants: 1
- Floor area: 350,000 square feet (33,000 m^{2})
- Floors: 1

Mercury Plaza Mall was a shopping mall located in Hampton, Virginia. The shopping mall opened in 1967 as Mercury Plaza. The mall was the Virginia Peninsula's first indoor shopping complex. Montgomery Ward, Roses and Giant Open Air Supermarket served as the mall's primary anchors.

== History ==
Mercury Plaza was built in 1967. Its first anchor store was Roses.

In the mid-1980s, the mall was renamed Mercury Plaza Mall, and Montgomery Ward moved its store to Coliseum Mall. It was replaced by Home Quarters Warehouse and Circuit City. In 1987, the remaining enclosed portion of the mall was razed, and was replaced with a Burlington Coat Factory store. Burlington Coat Factory opened in Mercury Plaza in November 1987, ending Mercury Plaza's status as an enclosed shopping mall. HQ left the complex by end of the 1980s. Roses and Giant (what later became Farm Fresh) left the shopping center in the early-1990s. Circuit City remained at Mercury Plaza until April 2002, and was the shopping center's only other retailer left except for Burlington Coat Factory.

Mall Properties, based in New York City, owned both Mercury Plaza and Coliseum Mall. The company decided to move Burlington Coat Factory to Coliseum Mall in July 2003. In September 2003, Mercury Plaza shopping center became vacant, and the original building structure was demolished.
