= Civic Plaza station =

Light rail station in Norfolk, Virginia, US

Civic Plaza

General information
- Location: St. Pauls Boulevard near Plume Street; Norfolk, Virginia
- Coordinates: 36.8455°N 76.2855°W
- Owner: Hampton Roads Transit
- Platforms: 2 side platforms
- Tracks: 2
- Connections: Hampton Roads Transit: 6, 8, 45, 961

Construction
- Structure type: At-grade
- Cycle facilities: Racks available
- Accessible: yes

History
- Opened: August 19, 2011

Services
Preceding station	Hampton Roads Transit	Following station
MacArthur Square toward EVMC/Fort Norfolk	The Tide	Harbor Park toward Newtown Road
Location

Civic Plaza station is a Tide Light Rail station in Norfolk, Virginia. It opened in 2011 and is located in the plaza in front of Norfolk City Hall, just east of St. Pauls Boulevard.

The station is adjacent to several government buildings and is just north of Dominion Tower and the Elizabeth River waterfront.
