= MacArthur Square station =

MacArthur Square
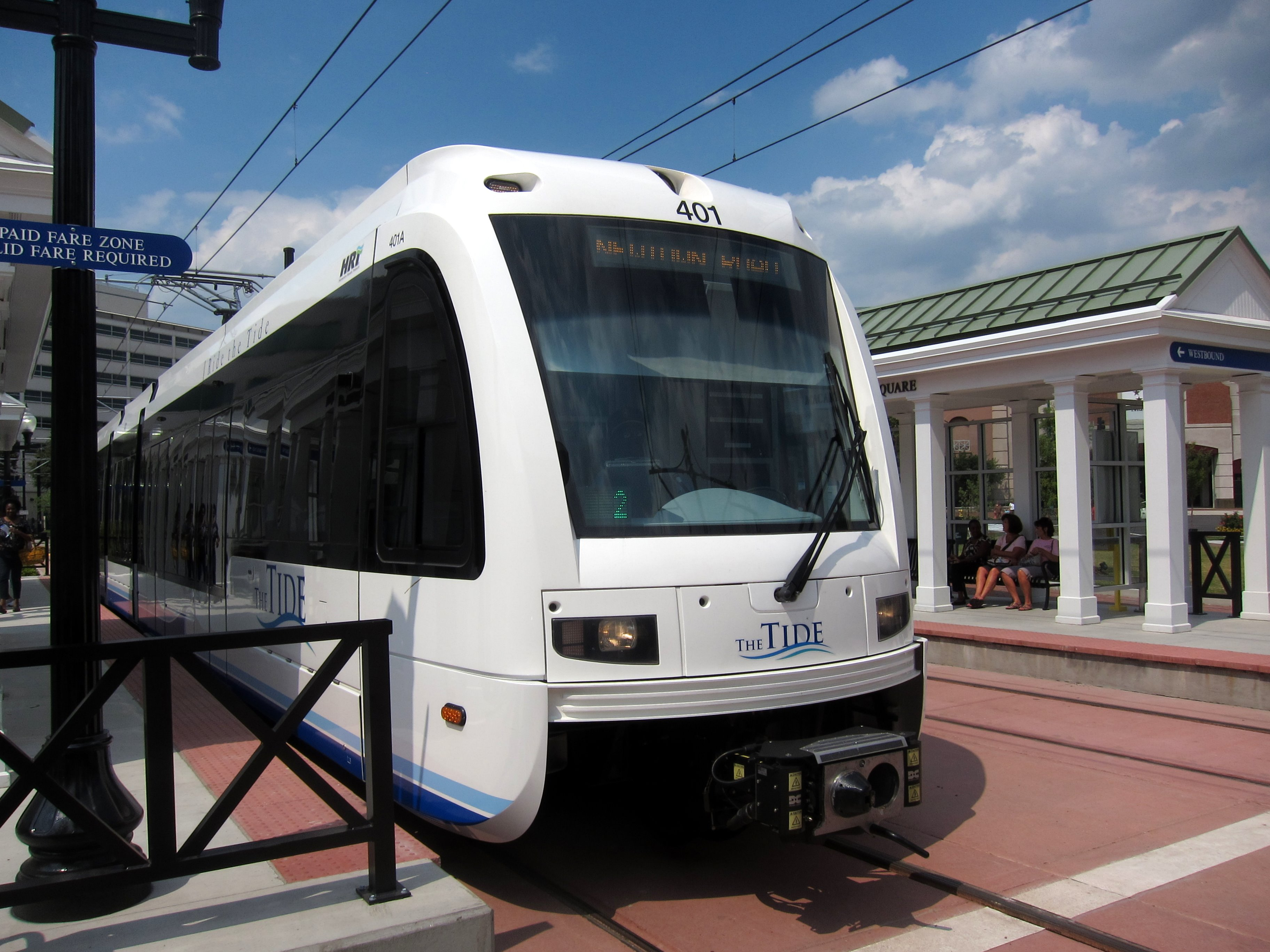
- The station in August 2011

General information
- Location: City Hall Avenue at Bank Street; Norfolk, Virginia
- Coordinates: 36.8472°N 76.2897°W
- Owner: Hampton Roads Transit
- Platforms: 2 side platforms
- Tracks: 2
- Connections: Hampton Roads Transit: 6, 8, 45

Construction
- Structure type: At-grade
- Cycle facilities: Racks available
- Accessible: yes

History
- Opened: August 19, 2011

Services
Preceding station	Hampton Roads Transit	Following station
Monticello toward EVMC/Fort Norfolk	The Tide	Civic Plaza toward Newtown Road
Location

MacArthur Square station is a Tide Light Rail station in Norfolk, Virginia. Opened in August 2011, it is situated in downtown Norfolk in a small block bounded by Plume Street, City Hall Avenue, Bank Street and Atlantic Street.

The station is adjacent to the MacArthur Center, MacArthur Memorial (former Norfolk City Hall), the Norfolk Library Downtown Branch, the business district along Main Street, Waterside Festival Marketplace, Nauticus, and many of downtown's larger hotels. This station is also the closest to HRT's Elizabeth River Ferry service to Downtown Portsmouth.
