= Ingleside Road station =

Light rail station in Norfolk, Virginia, U.S

Coordinates: 36.8427°N 76.2350°W

Ingleside Road
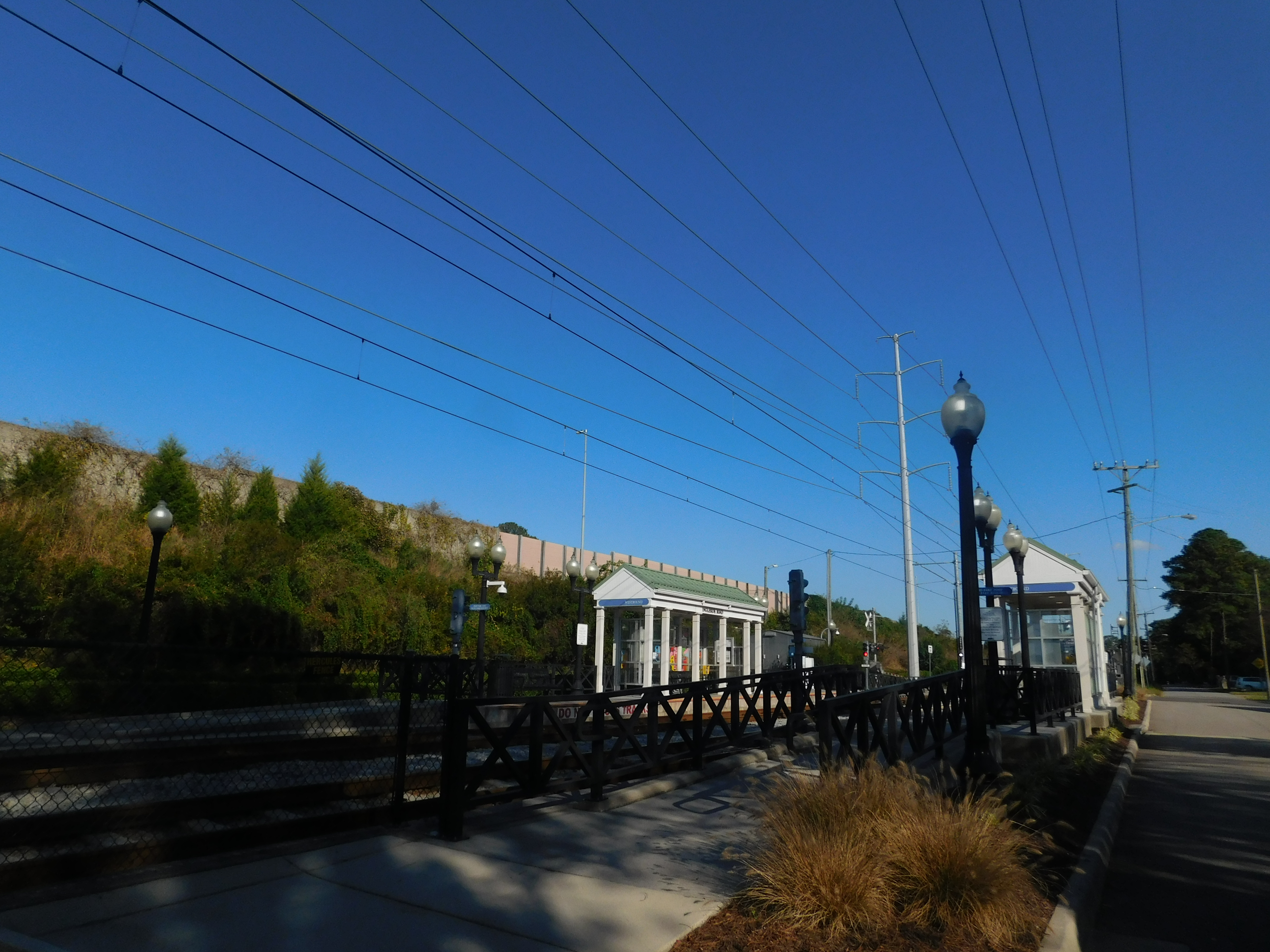
- Ingleside Road station in October 2021.

General information
- Location: Ingleside Road at Mississippi Avenue; Norfolk, Virginia
- Owner: Hampton Roads Transit
- Platforms: 2 side platforms
- Tracks: 2

Construction
- Structure type: At-grade
- Cycle facilities: Racks available
- Accessible: yes

History
- Opened: August 19, 2011

Services
Preceding station	Hampton Roads Transit	Following station
Ballentine/Broad Creek toward EVMC/Fort Norfolk	The Tide	Military Highway toward Newtown Road
Location

Ingleside Road station is a Tide Light Rail station in Norfolk, Virginia. It opened in August 2011 and is situated along Ingleside Road. The station primarily serves residents of adjacent neighborhoods.
