= NSU station =

Coordinates: 36.8459°N 76.2693°W

NSU
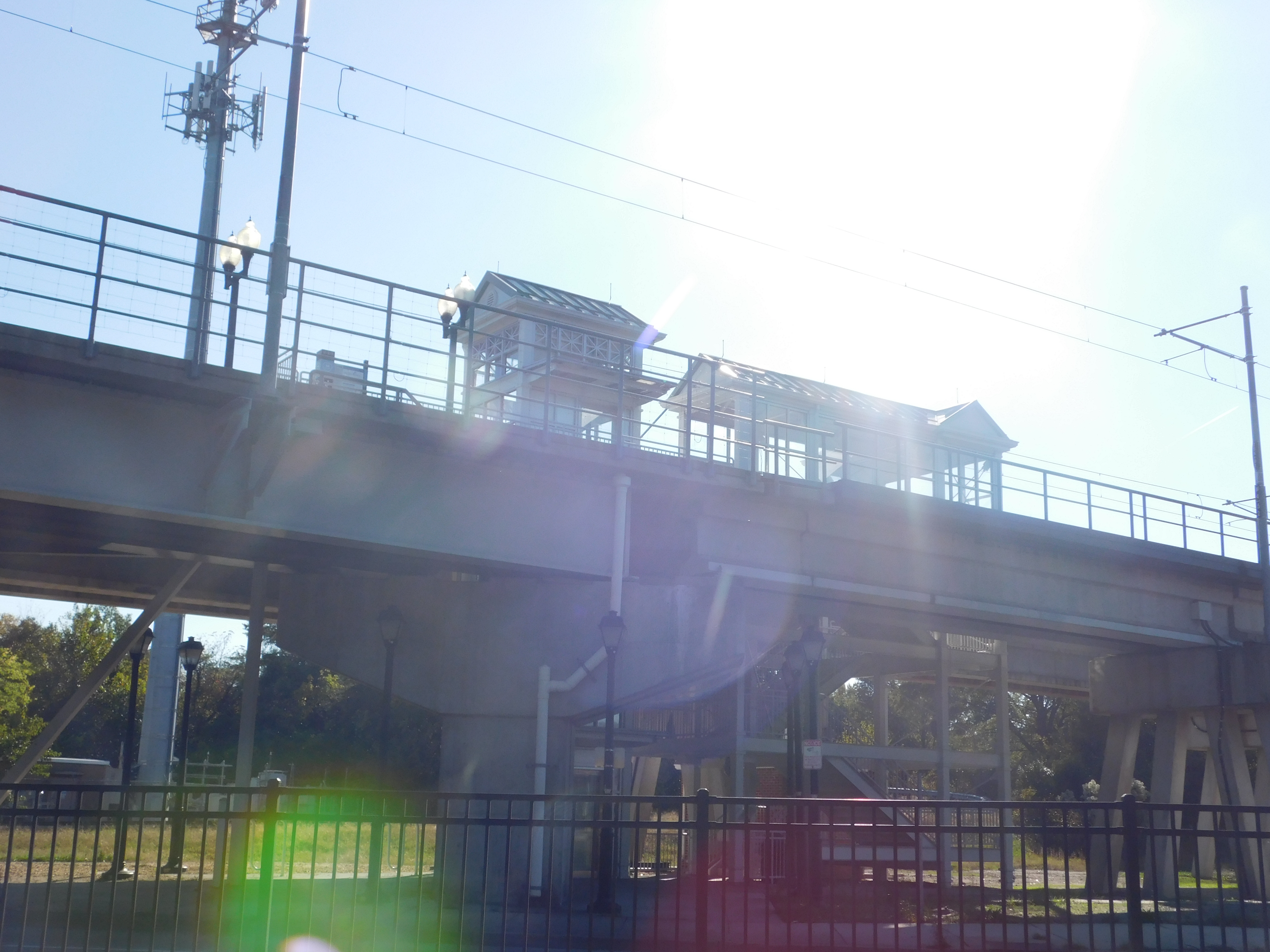

General information
- Location: Brambleton Avenue at I-264; Norfolk, Virginia
- Owner: Hampton Roads Transit
- Platforms: 1 island platform
- Tracks: 2
- Connections: Hampton Roads Transit: 9, 13, 18

Construction
- Structure type: Elevated
- Accessible: yes

History
- Opened: August 19, 2011

Services
Preceding station	Hampton Roads Transit	Following station
Harbor Park toward EVMC/Fort Norfolk	The Tide	Ballentine/Broad Creek toward Newtown Road
Location

NSU station is a Tide Light Rail station in Norfolk, Virginia. It opened in August 2011 and is situated adjacent to Norfolk State University (NSU), just west of Brambleton Avenue. It is the only Tide station that is elevated, and is accessible by stairs and elevator.
