= Monticello station =

Coordinates: 36°51′4.4″N 76°17′19.5″W

Monticello
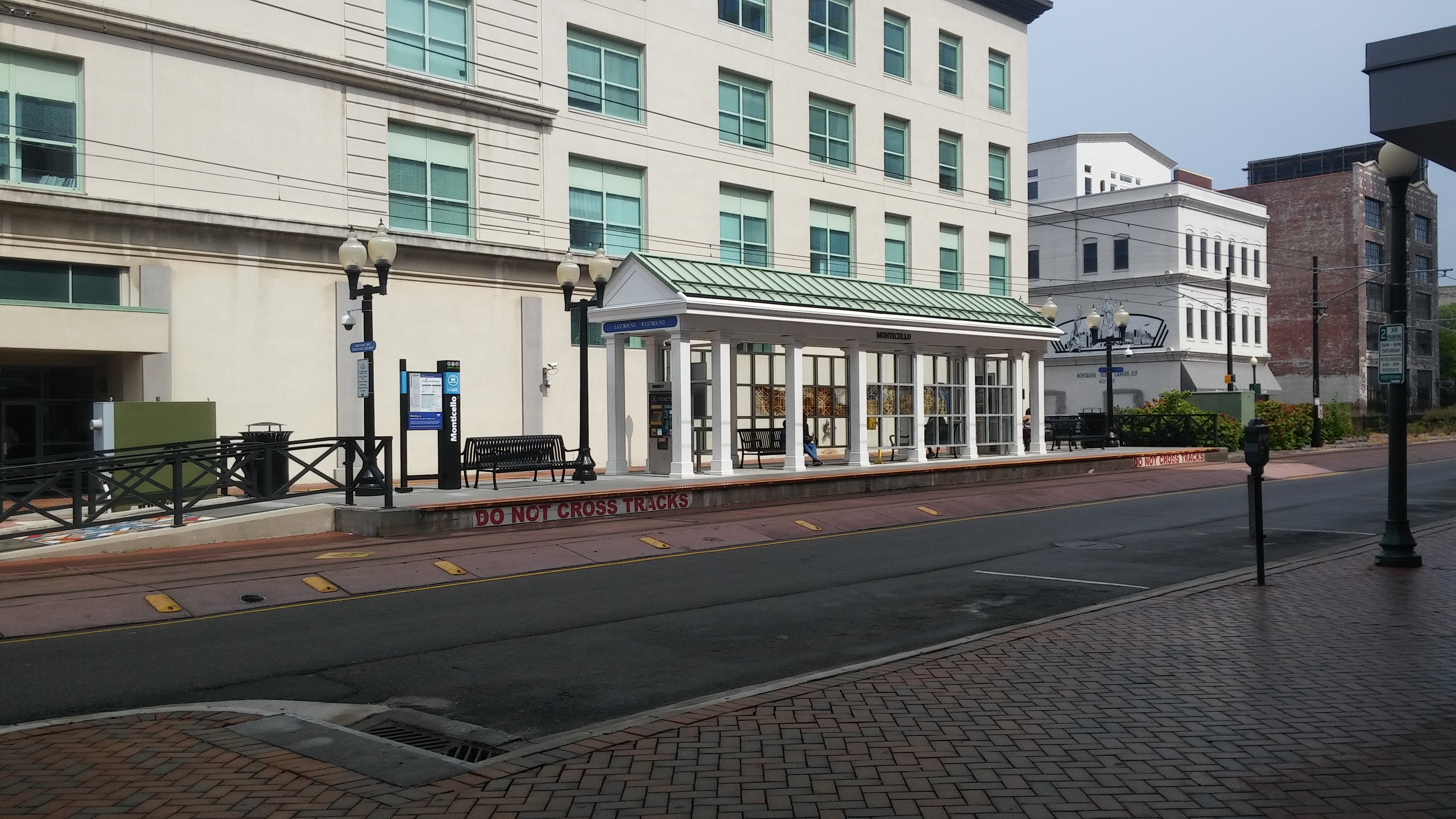

General information
- Location: Monticello Avenue at Freemason Street; Norfolk, Virginia
- Owner: Hampton Roads Transit
- Platforms: 1 island platform
- Tracks: 2
- Connections: Hampton Roads Transit: 1, 3

Construction
- Structure type: At-grade
- Accessible: yes

History
- Opened: August 19, 2011

Services
Preceding station	Hampton Roads Transit	Following station
York Street/Freemason toward EVMC/Fort Norfolk	The Tide	MacArthur Square toward Newtown Road
Location

Monticello station is a Tide Light Rail station in Norfolk, Virginia. It opened in August 2011 and is situated in downtown Norfolk on Monticello Avenue between Charlotte and Freemason Streets.

The station is adjacent to the MacArthur Center, the Norfolk Federal Courthouse, the TCC Roper Center for Performing Arts, Wells Theaters, Norfolk Scope, and the Tidewater Community College downtown campus.
