= Harbor Park station =

Coordinates: 36.8440°N 76.2780°W

Harbor Park
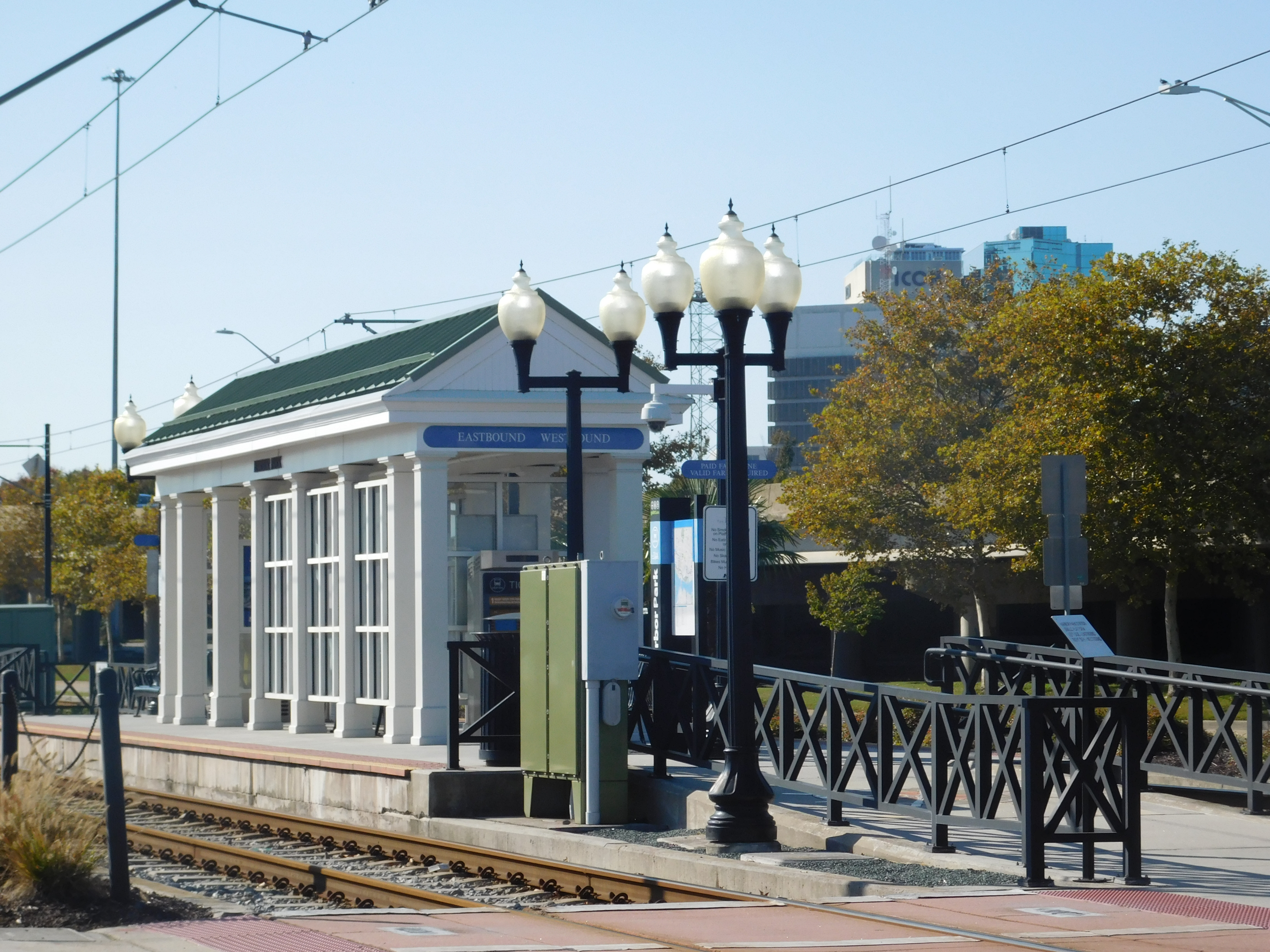

General information
- Location: Park Avenue near Holt Street; Norfolk, Virginia
- Owner: Hampton Roads Transit
- Platforms: 1 island platform
- Tracks: 2
- Connections: Amtrak at Norfolk station Elizabeth River Trail

Construction
- Structure type: At-grade
- Parking: 176 spaces
- Cycle facilities: Racks
- Accessible: yes

History
- Opened: August 19, 2011

Services
| Preceding station | Hampton Roads Transit | Following station |
|---|---|---|
| Civic Plaza toward EVMC/Fort Norfolk | The Tide | NSU toward Newtown Road |
Location

Harbor Park station is a Tide Light Rail station in Norfolk, Virginia. It sits in Downtown Norfolk along Park Avenue, next to Harbor Park baseball stadium.

The station was opened in August 2011 as the first part of an intermodal public transport hub that is to include bus, commuter rail, and ferry services. In December 2012, an Amtrak station opened next to the station.
