= Ballentine/Broad Creek station =

Light rail station in Norfolk, Virginia, U.S.

Coordinates: 36.8462°N 76.2532°W

Ballentine/Broad Creek
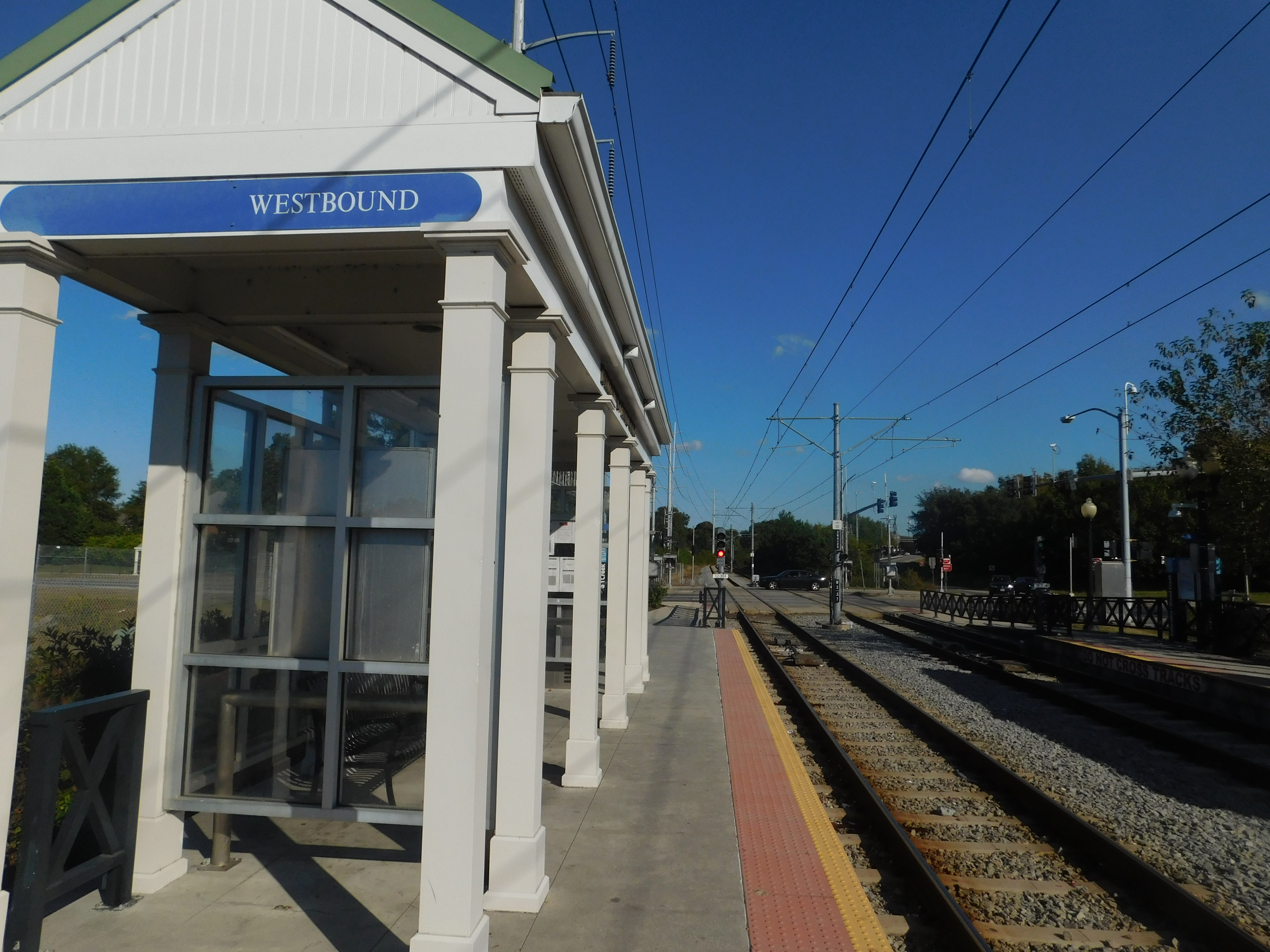
- Ballentine/Broad Creek station in October 2021.

General information
- Location: Ballentine Boulevard at I-264; Norfolk, Virginia
- Owner: Hampton Roads Transit
- Platforms: 1 island platform
- Tracks: 2
- Connections: Hampton Roads Transit: 18

Construction
- Structure type: At-grade
- Parking: 105 spaces
- Accessible: yes

History
- Opened: August 19, 2011

Services
Preceding station	Hampton Roads Transit	Following station
NSU toward EVMC/Fort Norfolk	The Tide	Ingleside Road toward Newtown Road
Location

Ballentine/Broad Creek station is a Tide Light Rail station in Norfolk, Virginia. It opened in August 2011, and is situated just west of Ballentine Boulevard. The station is adjacent to the east end of Norfolk State University and several residential neighborhoods.
