= Military Highway station =

Light rail station in Norfolk, Virginia, U.S.

Coordinates: 36.8415°N 76.2130°W

Military Highway
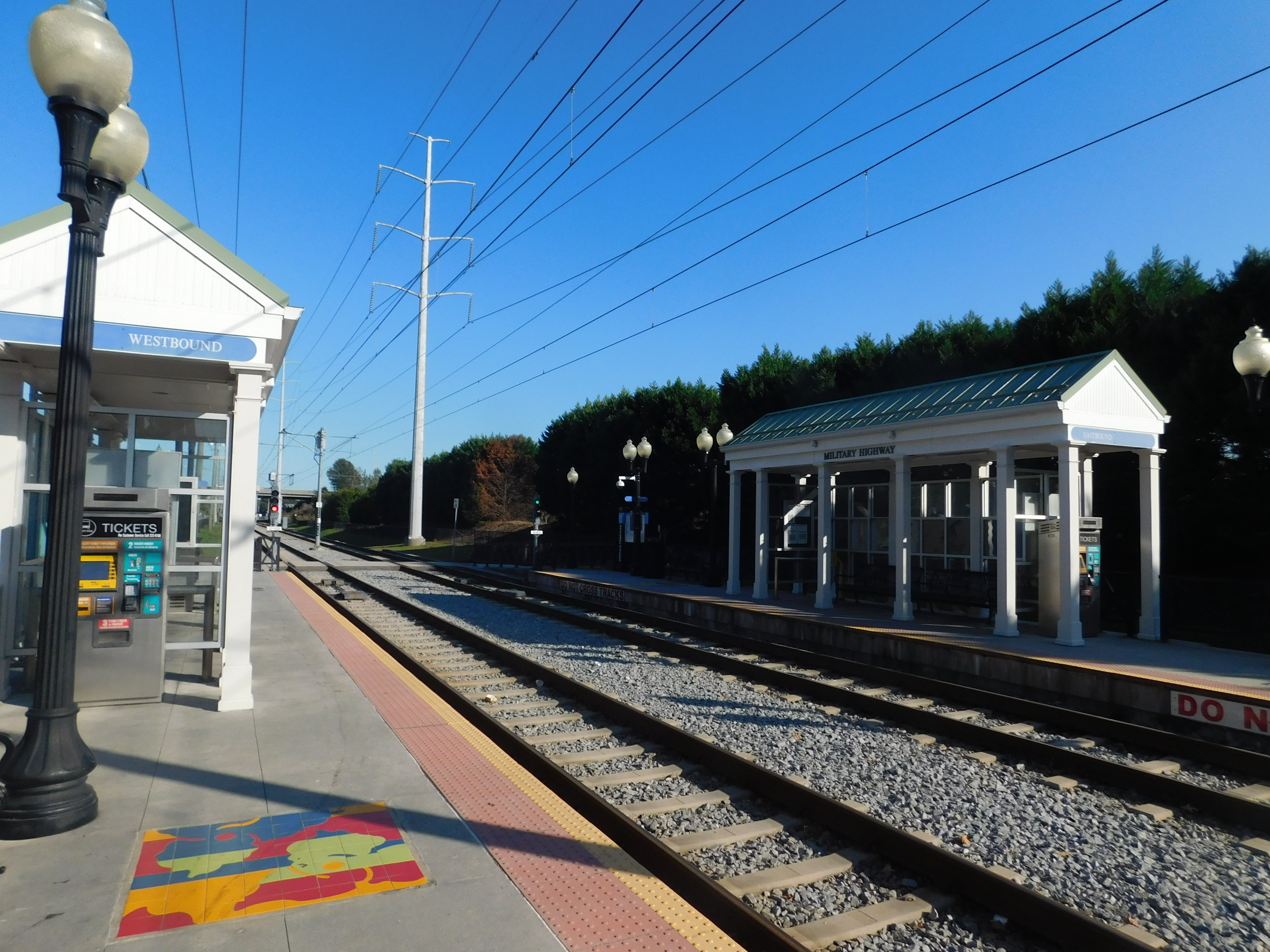
- Military Highway station in October 2021

General information
- Location: Military Highway at I-264; Norfolk, Virginia
- Owner: Hampton Roads Transit
- Platforms: 2 side platforms
- Tracks: 2
- Connections: Hampton Roads Transit: 15, 23, 967

Construction
- Structure type: At-grade
- Parking: 259 spaces
- Cycle facilities: Racks available
- Accessible: yes

History
- Opened: August 19, 2011

Services
Preceding station	Hampton Roads Transit	Following station
Ingleside Road toward EVMC/Fort Norfolk	The Tide	Newtown Road Terminus
Location

Military Highway station is a Tide Light Rail station in Norfolk, Virginia, USA. It opened in August 2011, and is situated along Military Highway. It is adjacent to a park and ride and connects with several bus routes.
