= York Street/Freemason station =

York Street/Freemason
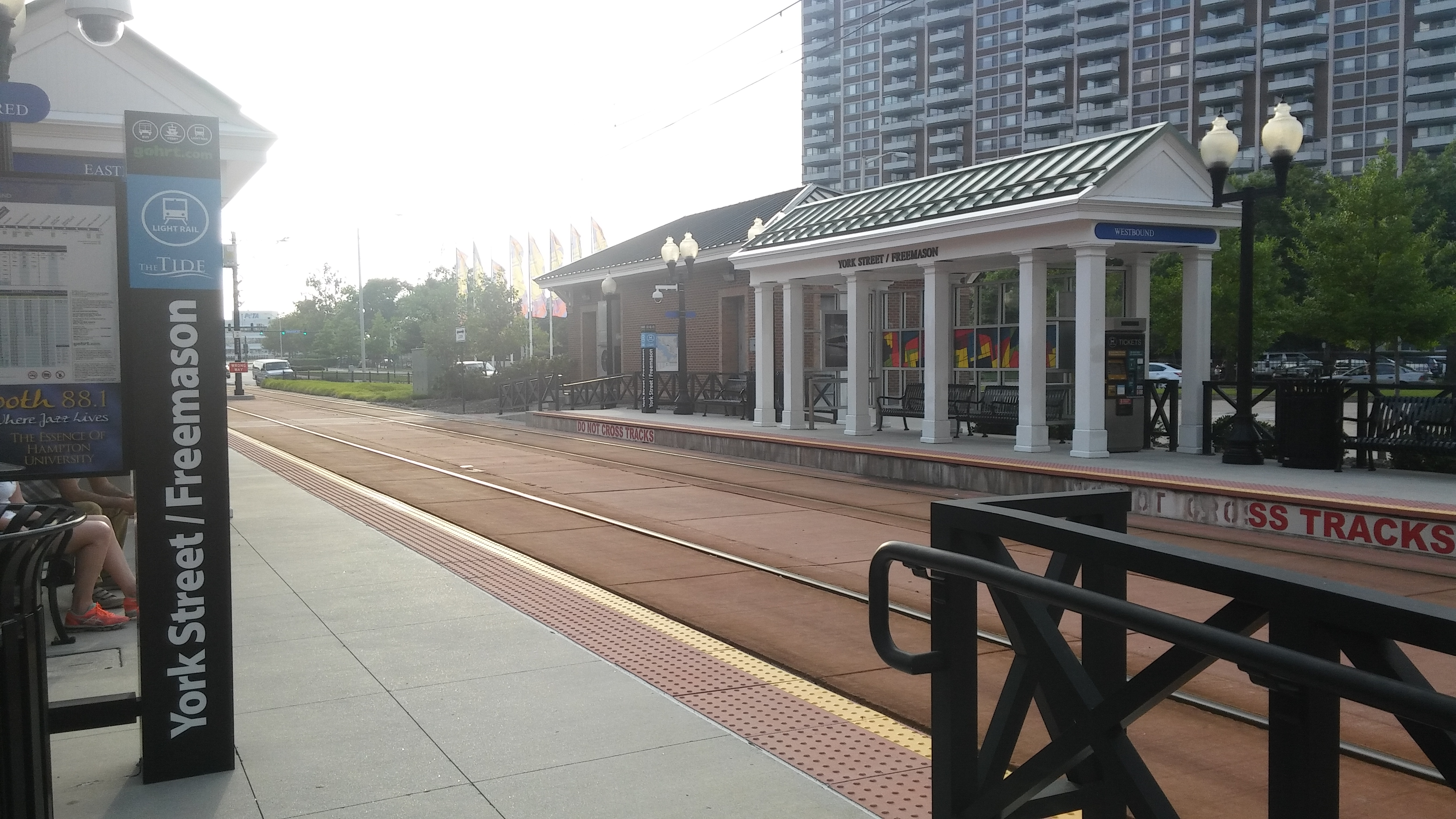

General information
- Location: York Street at Yarmouth Street; Norfolk, Virginia
- Coordinates: 36.8536°N 76.2941°W
- Owner: Hampton Roads Transit
- Platforms: 2 side platforms
- Tracks: 2

Construction
- Structure type: At-grade
- Cycle facilities: Racks available
- Accessible: yes

History
- Opened: August 19, 2011

Services
Preceding station	Hampton Roads Transit	Following station
EVMC/Fort Norfolk Terminus	The Tide	Monticello toward Newtown Road
Location

York Street/Freemason station is a Tide Light Rail station in Norfolk, Virginia. It opened in August 2011 and is situated on York Street between Yarmouth and Dunmore Streets in Downtown Norfolk.

The station is directly adjacent to the Norfolk YMCA and Belmont at Freemason and is close to the Freemason Historic District and Chrysler Museum of Art.
