= Norfolk station (Amtrak) =

Railway station in Norfolk, Virginia, US

Norfolk, VA
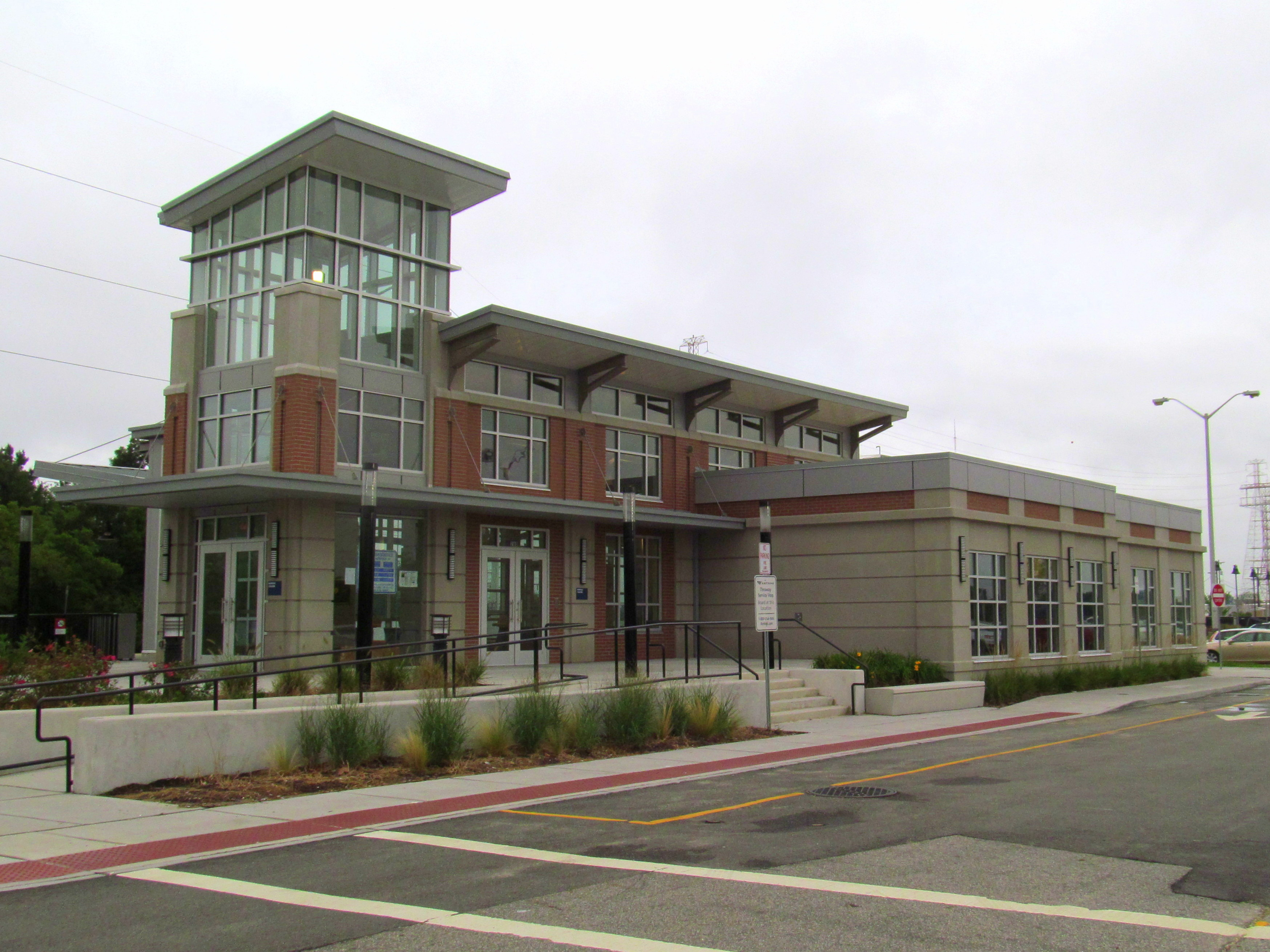
- Norfolk station in August 2014

General information
- Location: 280 Park Avenue; Norfolk, Virginia; United States
- Coordinates: 36.8433°N 76.2759°W
- Owner: City of Norfolk and Norfolk Southern Railway
- Platforms: 1 side platform
- Tracks: 3
- Connections: Tide Light Rail at Harbor Park; Amtrak Thruway

Construction
- Parking: Yes
- Accessible: Yes

Other information
- Station code: Amtrak: NFK

History
- Opened: December 12, 2012

Passengers
- FY 2025: 224,375 (Amtrak)

Services
Preceding station	Amtrak	Following station
Terminus	Northeast Regional	Petersburg toward Boston South or Springfield
Location

Norfolk station is a train station in Norfolk, Virginia. It sits along the Elizabeth River on the eastern edge of Downtown Norfolk, next to the Harbor Park baseball stadium and near the Harbor Park station of the Tide Light Rail system. Since 2012, it has served as the terminus of a branch of Amtrak's Northeast Regional service.

The city of Norfolk had long been served by passenger railroads, including Norfolk & Western at Norfolk Terminal Station (demolished 1963), and then by N&W and Amtrak at Lambert's Point station. But passenger service to the city dwindled in the mid-20th century and stopped altogether in 1977, when Amtrak ended its Mountaineer train.

In the 2010s, plans were laid to restart Amtrak service to Norfolk. The city government funded a new downtown station, a $3.75 million brick-and-glass structure designed by Michael Baker Corporation with a three-story tower. Service resumed on December 12, 2012, when only the station's concrete platform was complete. The station building opened on December 2, 2013.

A daily round trip was added on July 11, 2022, increasing Norfolk service to three weekday round trips and two weekend round trips.

== Routes ==
- Northeast Regional
