= Harbor Park =

Stadium in Norfolk, Virginia

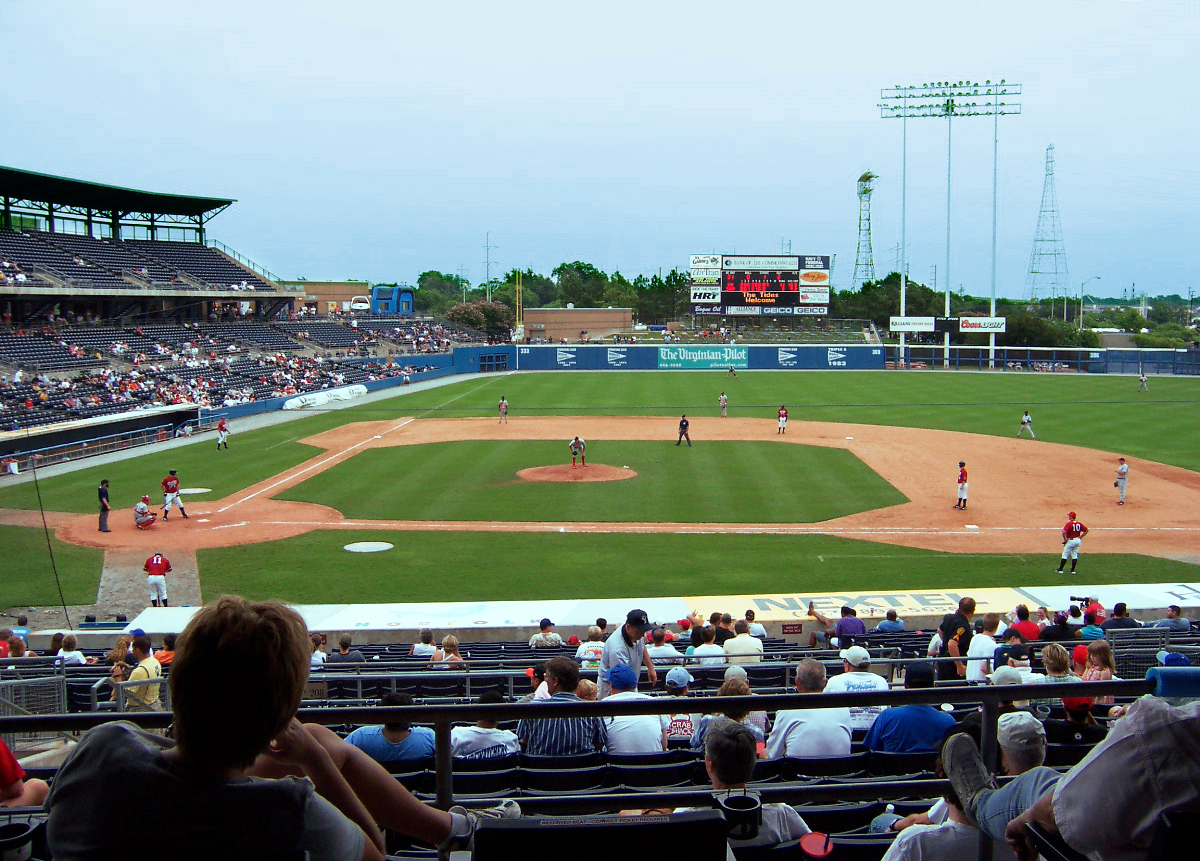
- Harbor Park in 2006

- Location within Virginia Location within the United States
- Location: 150 Park Avenue; Norfolk, Virginia; United States
- Coordinates: 36°50′34.04″N 76°16′43.93″W
- Owner: City of Norfolk
- Operator: Maryland Baseball Holding, LLC
- Capacity: 11,856 (2015–present); 12,067 (1993–2014)
- Surface: Grass
- Field size: Left field: 333 ft (101 m); Center field: 400 ft (120 m); Right field: 318 ft (97 m)

Construction
- Groundbreaking: February 21, 1992
- Opened: April 14, 1993
- Cost: $16 million ($35.7 million in 2025 dollars)
- Architects: Populous (Formerly HOK Sport)
- Project manager: McDevitt and Street Co.
- Structural engineer: Kerr Conrad Graham Associates
- Services engineers: Bredson & Associates, Inc.
- General contractor: OMNI Construction Inc.

Tenant
- Norfolk Tides (IL) 1993–present

Harbor Park is a stadium, used primarily for baseball, on the Elizabeth River, in downtown Norfolk, Virginia. Once rated the best minor league stadium by Baseball America, it is home to the Norfolk Tides Minor League Baseball team. The Tides are the Baltimore Orioles' Triple-A farm team and compete in the International League. Harbor Park opened on April 14, 1993, and can seat 12,067 people.

== Features ==
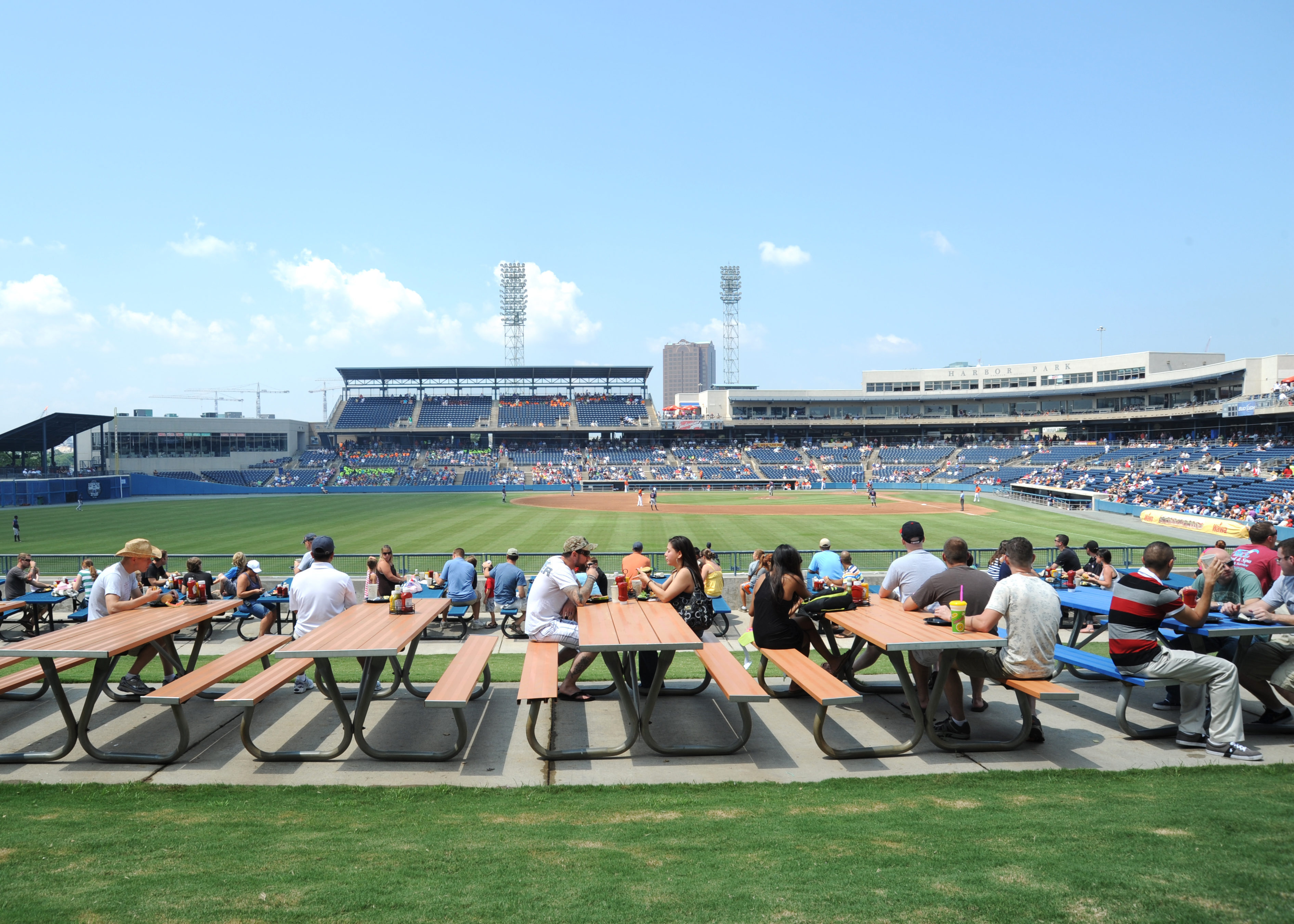
Picnic area in the outfield

Seating includes 9,000 lower deck seats, 2,800 upper deck seats and a 300-person capacity picnic area. The stadium also features 24 luxury skyboxes with seating for 400, and a 225-seat full-service restaurant with a panoramic view of the field from the first base side. A record crowd of 14,263 was reached August 31, 1996.

The field is a natural grass playing surface which features a state of the art irrigation and drainage system. The outfield dimensions are 333 feet to the left field foul pole, 400 feet to straightaway center, and 318 down the right field line.

A pair of video boards of which its combined size is the largest in the minor leagues were installed prior to the 2022 regular season. The replacement of the previous scoreboard in right field has a height and width of 32 by 114 feet (9.75 by 34.75 meters) and is second in size to the one at Las Vegas Ballpark. The newer video board in left field is 24 by 60 feet (7.32 by 18.29 meters). Both were constructed by Daktronics.

Throughout the 1990s, the stadium served as the home field for some of Norfolk's high school football games, primarily Maury, Granby, and Booker T. Washington. In 1996, BTW opened a new stadium on the school campus; in 2005, Maury and Granby moved to a new facility, Powhatan Field. In the past, the stadium also hosted high school football postseason games, although that has not happened since 2012.

== Transportation ==
The Tide light rail has a station along Park Avenue, adjacent to Harbor Park stadium. Amtrak also has its Norfolk station adjacent to the stadium.

== Notable events ==
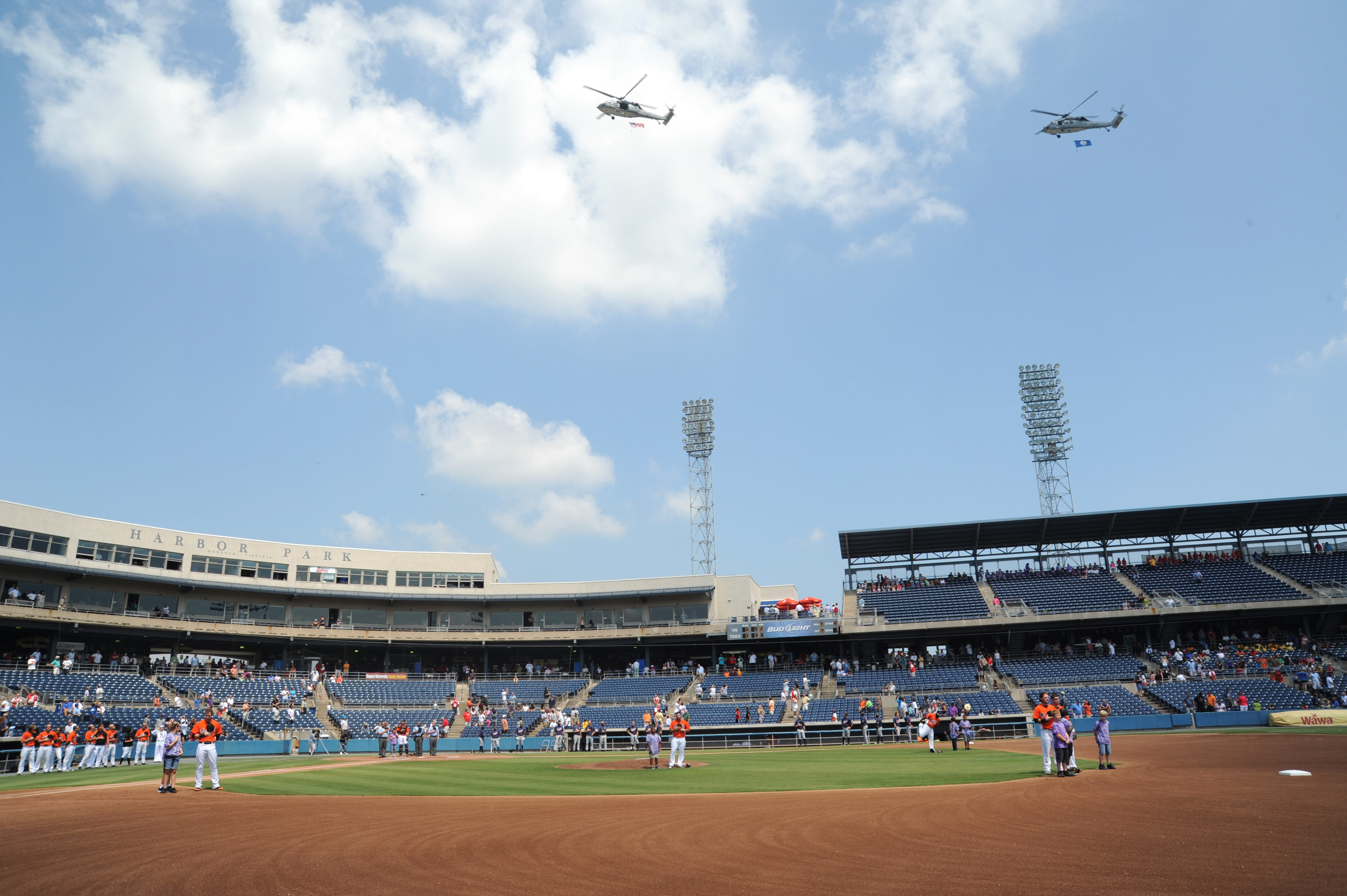
Sea Hawk helicopter flyover in 2012

Harbor Park hosted the 1998 Triple-A All-Star Game in which the International League All-Stars defeated the Pacific Coast League All-Stars, 8–4.

During Major League Baseball's search for a new home for the Montreal Expos, Norfolk submitted a proposal which would have expanded Harbor Park to temporarily accommodate a major league team. Norfolk's bid was rejected and the Expos eventually became the Washington Nationals.

On March 30, 2007, the Washington Nationals played an exhibition game against the Baltimore Orioles at Harbor Park. The game was sold out two weeks in advance; attendance was 12,408. The Orioles and Nationals played another exhibition game in 2009; the Orioles and Tides also play each other in occasional exhibition games, having done so in 2012, 2014, and 2018.

On October 28, 2008, Barack Obama held a rally at Harbor Park.

On December 16, 2008, the city of Norfolk approved a plan by the Tides to build a party deck in right field, behind the home team's bullpen. Completed in March 2009, two weeks before an Orioles–Nationals exhibition game, the deck holds 400 people but did not increase stadium capacity, except during sold-out games, when the deck accommodates some overflow. The right field fence was moved in 20 feet, to accommodate the deck, setting it at its current distance of 318 feet.

The concert band piece Harbor Park Holiday, written in 1996 by Norfolk native James L. Hosay, was written about Harbor Park.

On August 30, 2019, Harbor Park hosted the RIP Paul Walker fantasy football draft party. Actor Leslie David Baker of the hit television show The Office was in attendance as well.

Events and tenants
Preceded by Met Park	Home of the Norfolk Tides; 1993 – present	Succeeded by current
