= Peninsula Transportation District Commission =

Public transit service agency

PENTRAN, was formerly the public transit service that covered the cities of Hampton, Virginia and Newport News, Virginia from 1975 to 1999, both located within the Hampton Roads metropolitan area, on the Virginia Peninsula.

In January 1974, the Newport News City Council discussed entering into a mass transit authority with Hampton so they could acquire the privately owned Citizens Rapid Transit (CRT) and run a bus operation for the cities. Within a month, the Newport News and Hampton city councils had voted to form the Peninsula Transportation District Commission (PTDC), also known as PENTRAN.

The PTDC purchased CRT, and by April 1975 the new public bus company, PENTRAN, was providing service in Hampton and Newport News.

PENTRAN merged with Tidewater Regional Transit in 1999, to form Hampton Roads Transit.
