= The Tide (light rail) =

Light rail line in Norfolk, Virginia

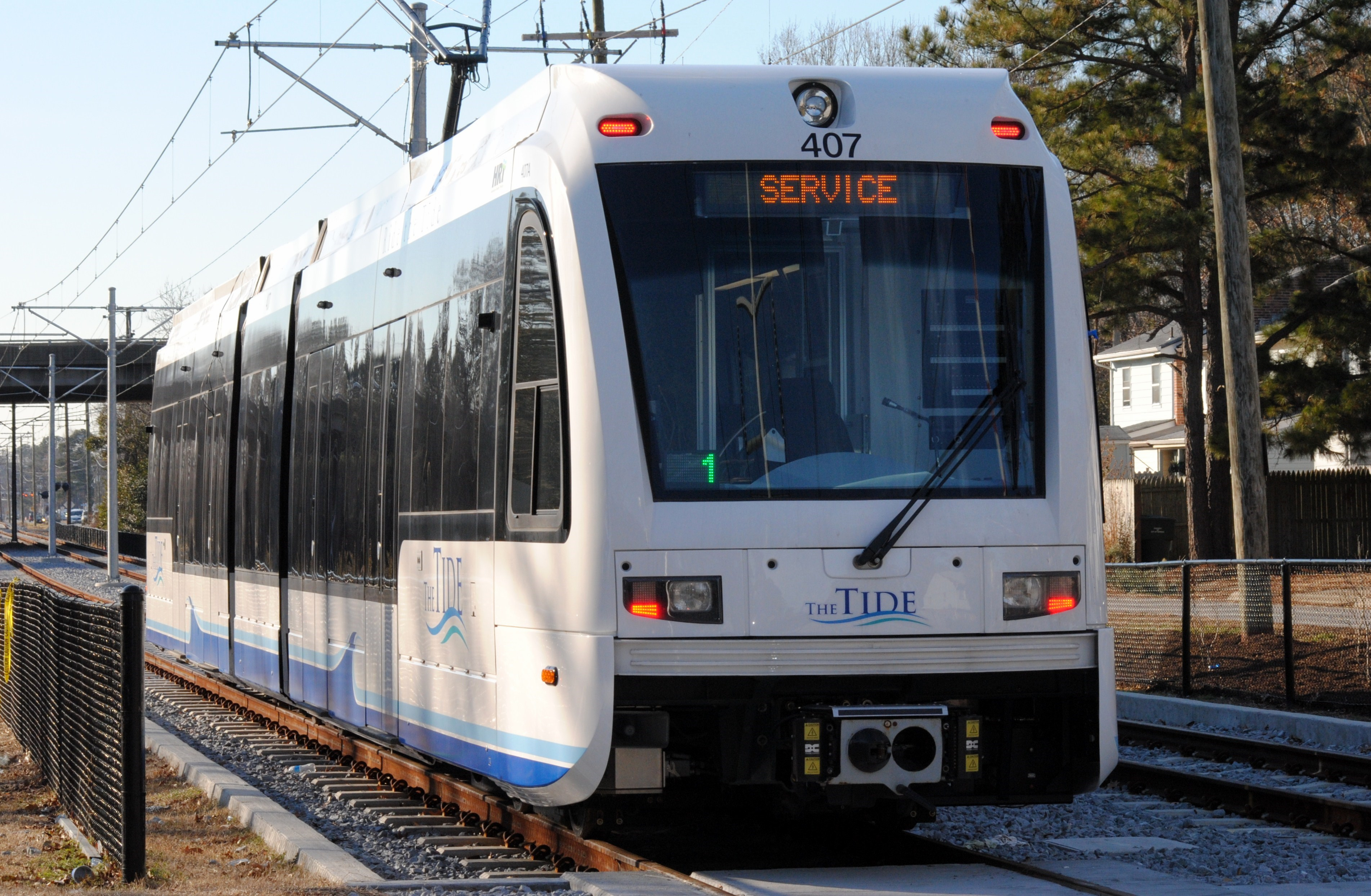
- The Tide light rail train during a test run in January 2011

Overview
- Owner: Hampton Roads Transit
- Locale: Norfolk, Virginia, U.S.
- Termini: EVMC/Fort Norfolk (west); Newtown Road (east)
- Stations: 11
- Website: gohrt.com/services/the-tide

Service
- Type: Light rail
- Rolling stock: Siemens S70
- Daily ridership: 2,900 (weekdays, Q2 2026)
- Ridership: 865,500 (2025)

History
- Opened: August 19, 2011

Technical
- Line length: 7.4 mi (11.9 km)
- Number of tracks: 2
- Character: At-grade
- Track gauge: 4 ft 8 1/2 in (1,435 mm) standard gauge
- Electrification: Overhead line, 750 V DC
- Operating speed: 18.5 mph (29.8 km/h) (avg.)
Route map
The Tide highlighted in blue

The Tide is a 7.4-mile (12 km) light rail line in Norfolk, Virginia, United States, owned and operated by Hampton Roads Transit (HRT). It connects Eastern Virginia Medical School, downtown Norfolk, Norfolk State University, and Newtown Road. Service began on August 19, 2011, making it the first light rail system in Virginia. Fares match local bus fares and the line accepts HRT's GO Passes. Trains generally run every 15 minutes, increasing to every 10 minutes during peak periods and every 30 minutes during early mornings and late evenings. In 2025, the system had a ridership of 865,500, or about 2,900 per weekday as of the second quarter of 2026.

== History ==
In the late 1980s, the Tidewater Transportation District Commission (TTDC) began producing studies that would examine the feasibility of expanding transit corridors between Norfolk and its neighboring cities of Chesapeake, Portsmouth, Suffolk, and Virginia Beach; these included a study for the cost effectiveness of restoring passenger rail service in 1986 and a rail systems analysis in 1991. Four years later, TTDC pursued a Major Investment Study and in 1997, identified a locally preferred alternative for an 18-mile (29 km) east–west light rail line between downtown Norfolk and the Virginia Beach oceanfront. The alignment would have run along an exclusive double-track right-of-way that followed the Norfolk Southern Railway and contained 13 stations. In 1999, the Virginia Beach City Council asked its residents in a referendum whether it should adopt a local ordinance to help develop and finance the light rail project. On November 2, Virginia Beach residents voted against the referendum, 56 percent to 44 percent.

After Virginia Beach pulled out of a proposal that would have seen the construction of a light rail line connecting downtown Norfolk with the Virginia Beach oceanfront in 1999, Norfolk began developing a network that would be constructed entirely within its city limits.

Beginning in 2000, HRT and federal transit officials worked to create a plan that would attract federal funding. On September 22, 2006, the Federal Transit Administration announced that the proposal met federal criteria for design, and would receive funding for a final design. On October 1, 2007, the FTA signed the agreement to appropriate $128 million for the construction of the network. The remainder of the project will be divided three ways, with the city of Norfolk contributing $33 million, the Commonwealth of Virginia contributing $31.9 million, and $39.2 million being contributed from other federal sources.

Officials announced in June 2007 that the system would be called The Tide, a name that beat out other proposed names, including Bay Runner, First Rail, Dash, Bay Breeze, Sail and Shore Line.

=== Construction problems ===
The line had been planned to open in January 2010, however cost overruns, extended testing of trains, and electronic signage required three delays.

In January 2010, HRT's executive director, Michael Townes, was pressured by the board of directors and ultimately agreed to step down after the project overshot its budget by $100 million and missed by one year its operational deadline. A majority of the board members cited poor management and communication on his part. He was to serve at full pay and benefits helping with a transition and continue to seek additional funding until September 2010, after which the board agreed to a severance package of full pay and benefits for another full year. As an interim measure, the board hired former VDOT Commissioner Philip Shucet for 1 year effective February 1, 2010 at the rate of $40,000 per month to lead the agency, with a mandate to restore financial integrity and communication pending selection of a new executive director.

In May 2010 elections, voters ousted Norfolk city councilman Randy Wright, a long-time incumbent, HRT board member, and light rail supporter. His opponent, also an advocate of light rail, cited the waste and delays under Towne's administration. Another HRT board member, Paige Washington, also lost a reelection bid in Hampton. News media sources reported that "Three million dollars [of HRT funds designated for projects on the Virginia Peninsula] were diverted to Norfolk to [help] pay for its light rail cost overrun".

=== Opening ===
On June 21, 2011, HRTs announced the line would open on August 19 initially with demonstration rides followed by regular service beginning on August 22. Due to high ridership during the initial demonstration period, estimated at over 46,000 riders, the demonstration period was extended, with regular service to begin on August 28.

On September 21, 2011, Hampton Roads Transit announced the introduction of online ticketing and onboard WiFi to The Tide.

=== Financing ===
The Tide cost $318 million to construct, and is estimated to cost $6.2 million a year to operate.

The line was primarily financed by a $232 million grant from the Federal Transit Administration approved in October 2007. Additional federal funding came from a $32.8 million grant from the American Recovery and Reinvestment Act. The final cost of the project was estimated to be $318.5 million, $106 million over the original estimate — or approximately just under $27 million per kilometer ($43 million per mile)."

== Rolling stock ==
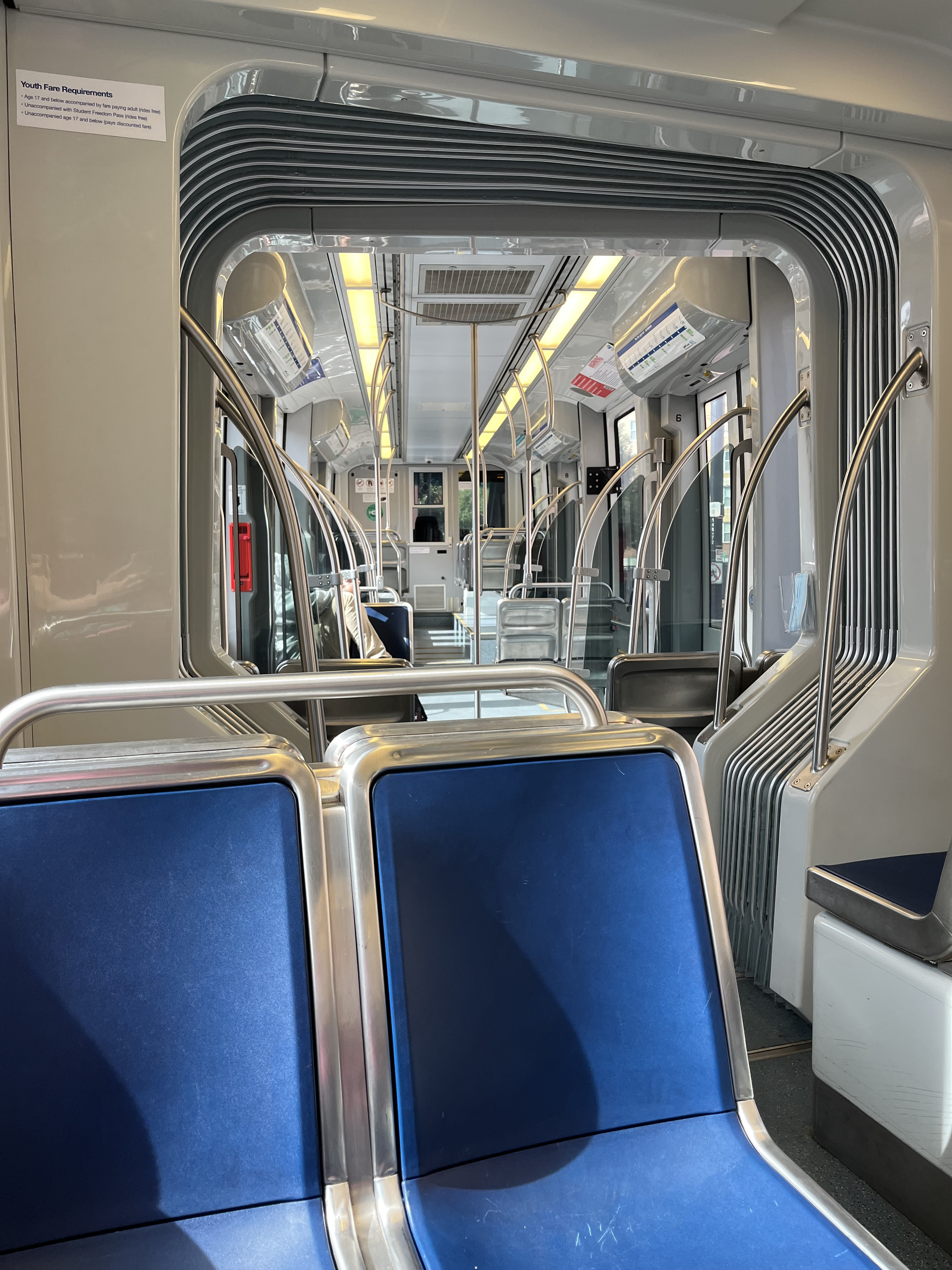
The interior of one of the Siemens S70 trains as seen from the middle section

In September 2007, HRT's commission voted to purchase nine Siemens-built S70 vehicles, similar to those currently in operation in Houston, Texas and Charlotte, North Carolina. These vehicles formed The Tide's initial fleet of light rail vehicles, with the first car arriving on October 6, 2009. The vehicles are currently stored at the Norfolk Tide Facility at 1850 Brambleton Avenue, east of NSU station on the rail line.

== Service ==
The trains generally run every 15 minutes; they run every 10 minutes during peak periods and every 30 minutes during early weekend mornings and late evenings. Light rail service is offered from 6:00 a.m. through 10 p.m Mondays through Thursdays, 6:00 a.m. through midnight on Fridays and Saturdays, 7:00 a.m through 9:00 p.m. on Sundays, and 9:00 a.m. through 9:00 p.m. on federal holidays.

== Ridership ==
Daily ridership in 2011 was projected at 2,900 passengers, increasing to 7,130 passengers by 2030. Actual daily ridership up to April 17, 2012 was approximately 4,900, allowing the service to reach its goal of 1 million rides 150 days earlier than had been projected.

== Route ==
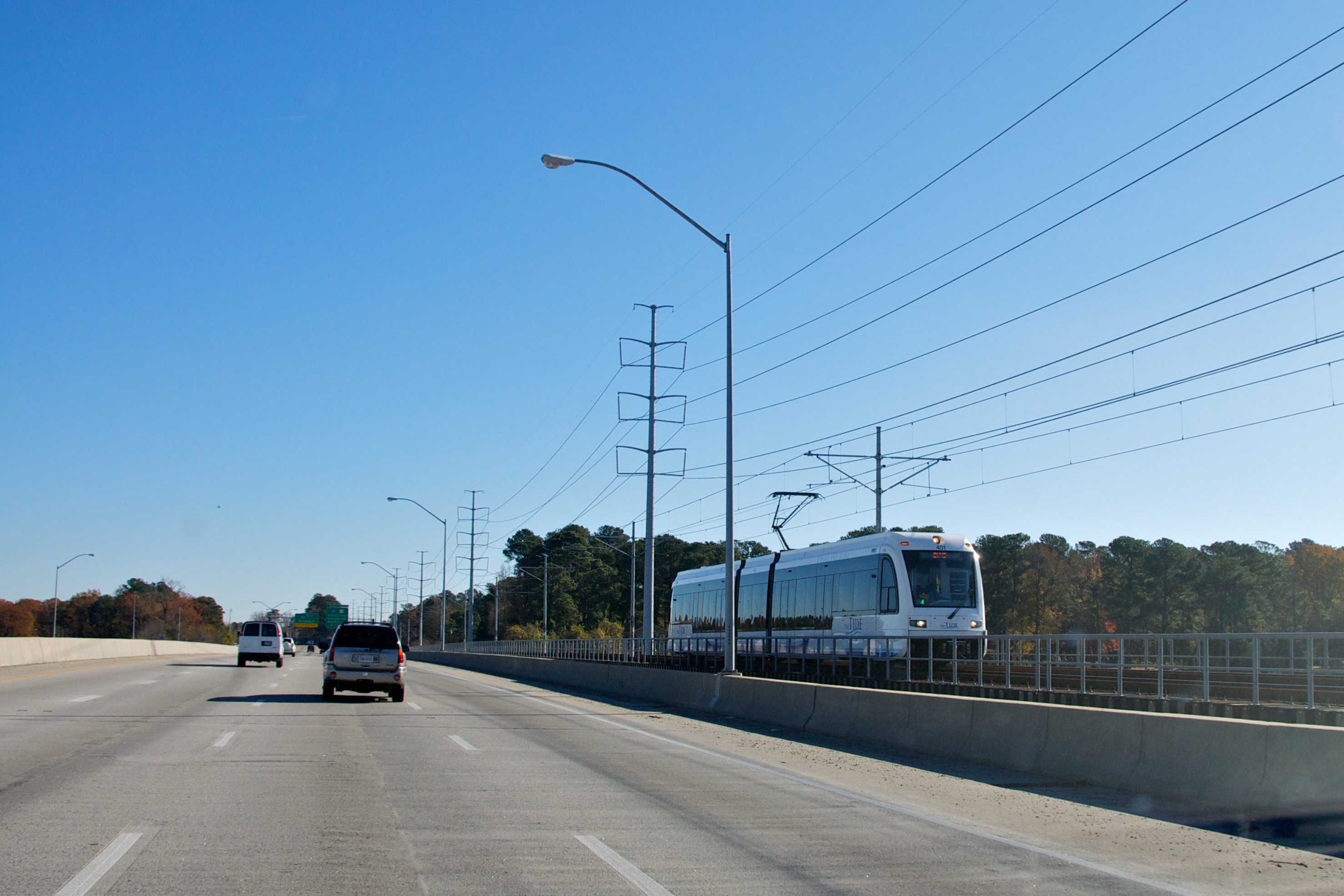
Part of the Tide's original route parallels I-264.

The Tide is designed with the hope that TOD (Transit-oriented development) will be constructed along the light rail line, creating a smart growth transit corridor to help guide growth using compact mixed-use development practices, as well as curbing traffic congestion.

Most of the Tide's route east of downtown Norfolk operates on newly-laid track along the former Norfolk Southern Railway line that runs due east to the resort area of Virginia Beach. The Norfolk Southern Railway had previously abandoned that line. That right-of-way had carried both freight and passenger traffic until the end of World War II, and then operated as a freight-only railway for several additional decades. The current eastern end of The Tide is at Newtown Road, which is the Norfolk-Virginia Beach boundary line.

By contrast, The Tide's route from the Harbor Park area west within downtown Norfolk and north-west to the Medical Center area is entirely new right-of-way.

=== Stations ===
Key
| † | Terminus |
| Parking | Park and ride |

| Station | Opened | Vertical alignment | Platform layout | Connections and notes |
|---|---|---|---|---|
| EVMC/Fort Norfolk† | August 19, 2011 | At-grade | 1 side platform | : 2, 23; |
| York Street/Freemason | August 19, 2011 | At-grade | 2 side platforms | — |
| Monticello | August 19, 2011 | At-grade | 1 island platform | : 1, 3 |
| MacArthur Square | August 19, 2011 | At-grade | 2 side platforms | : 6, 8, 45, 960 |
| Civic Plaza | August 19, 2011 | At-grade | 2 side platforms | : 6, 8, 45, 960, 961 |
| Harbor Park | August 19, 2011 | At-grade | 1 island platform | Amtrak: Northeast Regional; |
| NSU | August 19, 2011 | Elevated | 1 island platform | : 9, 13, 18 |
| Ballentine/Broad Creek | August 19, 2011 | At-grade | 1 island platform | : 18; |
| Ingleside Road | August 19, 2011 | At-grade | 2 side platforms | — |
| Military Highway | August 19, 2011 | At-grade | 2 side platforms | : 15, 23, 967; |
| Newtown Road† | August 19, 2011 | At-grade | 1 side platform | : 20, 22, 25, 27, 960; |

== Incidents ==
On December 28, 2023, a 14 year old boy was shot on board one of the light rail vehicles while it was in downtown Norfolk. The driver was able to quickly get help and the injuries were reported to not be life-threatening. A 16 year old and 14 year old were arrested and charged for the crime. In response, HRT said that they would increase security on the trains and at the stations.

== Future expansion ==
The Commonwealth of Virginia's Department of Rail & Public Transportation is studying possible extensions to The Tide in several different directions within the multi-city Hampton Roads area.

Hampton Roads Transit, the Hampton Roads Transportation Planning Organization, and local cities are exploring extensions of the starter line. Possible extensions might run north to the Norfolk Naval Base, east to the Virginia Beach oceanfront and resort area, west to Portsmouth, and south to Chesapeake.

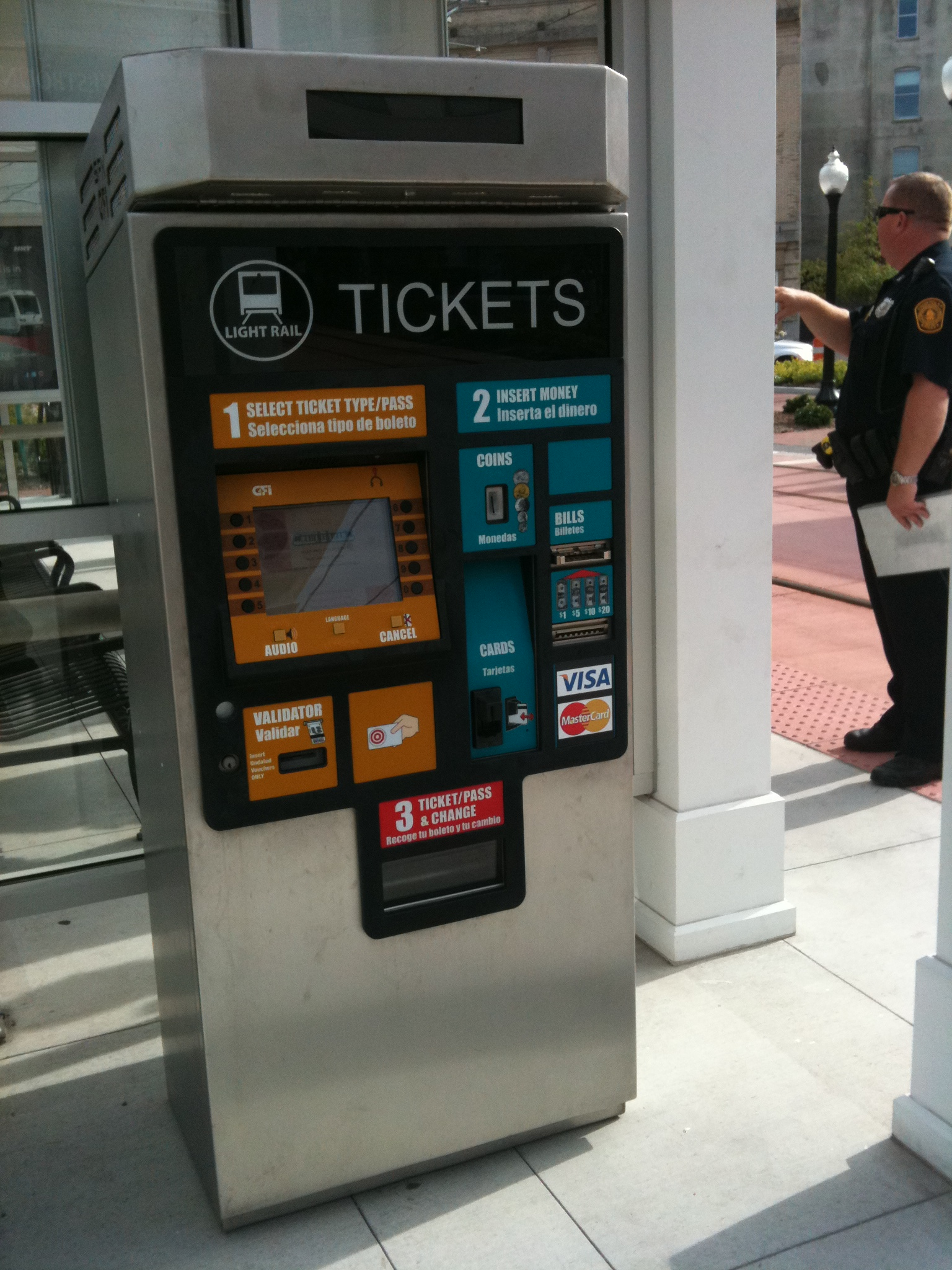
A ticket vending machine

=== Chesapeake ===
One possible extension would run south from Norfolk, probably terminating in the Greenbrier area of Chesapeake, Virginia.

=== Norfolk ===
A second possible extension would continue The Tide from the Medical Center terminus to Naval Station Norfolk, which would connect Old Dominion University to the light rail service. The naval base is one of the largest employers in the Hampton Roads area and ODU is a large public university. In 2018, HRT determined this extension would be too costly and instead began to focus on an extension in the eastern portion of the city to include Military Circle.

=== Peninsula ===
The Peninsula Rapid Transit Project is exploring the feasibility of light rail in Newport News. Likely stops for The Tide on the Peninsula would include downtown Newport News, the Newport News Amtrak passenger railway station, the Oyster Point area, and Newport News/Williamsburg International Airport. An extension between downtown Newport News and downtown Hampton is also being considered.

=== Virginia Beach ===
This proposed LRT extension would continue along the former Norfolk Southern (NS) Railway right of way. Major stops would be located at Virginia Beach Town Center in the Pembroke area, near Oceana Naval Air Station, and would terminate in the resort area at the Virginia Beach Convention Center, a few blocks west of the Atlantic Ocean. A possible spur would branch at the NS Railway's Oceana Junction (just east of London Bridge Road and just north of Potters Road) and use the existing abandoned railway right-of-way along the west side of Oceana Naval Air Station to the south. As another possible LRT extension, most of the former NS Railway line from the Witchduck Road area south to the Virginia Beach Municipal Center remains currently undeveloped.

In 2011 the city of Virginia Beach suggested it might extend The Tide light rail service east from the Newtown Road terminus. Virginia Beach's mayor at the time, Will Sessoms, said the city hoped to purchase the right of way. The city subsequently purchased the tracks for $40 million, using $10 million of local tax funds – which would allow a total rail length of about 18 miles (29 km). The extension is estimated to cost $254 million to the Town Center and $807 million to the Oceanfront.

In 2016, voters in Virginia Beach rejected expansion of the light rail into the municipality. Consequently, all planning for extension of the system into Virginia Beach has been halted indefinitely.

==== History ====
In November 1999, the City of Virginia Beach conducted a referendum regarding the construction and operation of light rail into Virginia Beach along the Norfolk Southern (NS) railroad line. The proposed route would connect downtown Norfolk to the Virginia Beach oceanfront. The referendum led to a community discussion of the proposed light rail and feeder bus system. Local media and special interest groups debated the matter in great detail, using information provided by a Draft Environmental impact statement (DEIS). Voters of Virginia Beach rejected the proposed light rail system citing possible unwanted bad elements a passenger train could bring.

Virginia Beach City Council then passed a 10-year resolution declaring that the city would no longer have any future involvement in the proposed light rail line.

Years later, a major economic and development hub was built along the NS corridor, known as Virginia Beach Town Center. The new Town Center, along with record high gas prices in 2008, changed the narrative and resulted in new public interest in rail again.

Virginia Beach then purchased the section of track within their jurisdiction from NS.

In April 2012, the Virginia Beach City Council voted 10–1 to allow voters to determine the fate of the extension in the November 2012 general election.

In the April 2011 State of the City, Sessoms said that "whether the corridor is eventually developed with Bus Rapid Transit or a light rail line is unknown at this time," citing cost and ridership issues.

In April 2011, HRT paused the study until 9–12 months of ridership data from the Tide Light Rail in Norfolk was collected.

In November 2012, voters approved a non-binding referendum supporting expansion of light rail into Virginia Beach by a 62 percent majority. A study to fix costs for the project will be completed in 2014. The State of Virginia has pledged $155 million towards the extension to Virginia Beach, as well as lending up to $30 million from the Virginia Transportation Infrastructure Bank. The final route selected by the Virginia Beach City Council was the 3.5 mile short extension to the Town Center at Virginia Beach in mid-2015.

On November 8, 2016, after a successful vote four years earlier and a 30% Preliminary Design finished a month earlier, 57% of Virginia Beach voters voted against the referendum regarding to use city funds to pay part of the Town Center extension, which would have been close to $90 million. As a result, all work on the light rail extension was stopped, including discontinuing the order for three more light rail cars and Virginia Secretary of Transportation Aubrey Layne reappointed the $155 million back to the Smart Scale program for transportation funding throughout the Commonwealth. The cost of extending the line was $243.1 million, with around $80 million per mile. The Virginia Beach City Council had several months to decide what to do with the purchased railroad line. If they could not decide, the city had to refund the $20 million back to Virginia. The Virginia Beach City Council ended up deciding to refund the $20 million back to the state.

== See also ==
- Light rail in North America
- Hampton Roads Transit
