= Norfolk City Hall =

- U.S. National Register of Historic Places
- Virginia Landmarks Register
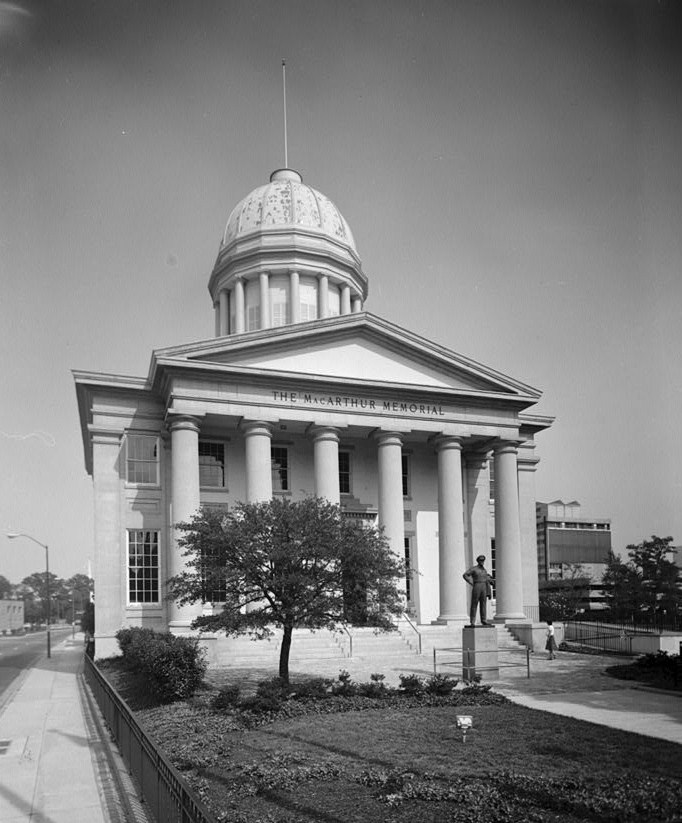
- Norfolk City Hall & Courthouse, HABS Photo, August 1981

- Location within Virginia Location within the United States
- Location: 421 E. City Hall Ave., Norfolk, Virginia
- Coordinates: 36°50′50″N 76°17′21″W
- Area: 1 acre (0.40 ha)
- Built: 1847
- Architect: Singleton, William R.
- NRHP reference No.: 72001511
- VLR No.: 122-0019

Significant dates
- Added to NRHP: March 16, 1972
- Designated VLR: November 16, 1971

Norfolk City Hall, also known as the MacArthur Memorial, is a historic city hall located at Norfolk, Virginia. It was built in 1847, and is a two-story, stuccoed and granite faced, temple-form building measuring 80 feet (24 m) by 60 feet (18 m). It features a front portico supported by six massive Tuscan order columns, and a gable roof topped by a cupola. The building housed city offices until 1918, and courtrooms until 1960.

In 1961, the entire building interior was gutted to house the museum and tomb of General Douglas MacArthur and his wife. The MacArthur Memorial also includes a visitor center building and a research center.

Norfolk City Hall was listed on the National Register of Historic Places in 1972.

== See also ==
- List of mayors of Norfolk, Virginia
