= Newtown Road station =

Light rail station in Norfolk, Virginia, U.S

Coordinates: 36.8411°N 76.1902°W

Newtown Road
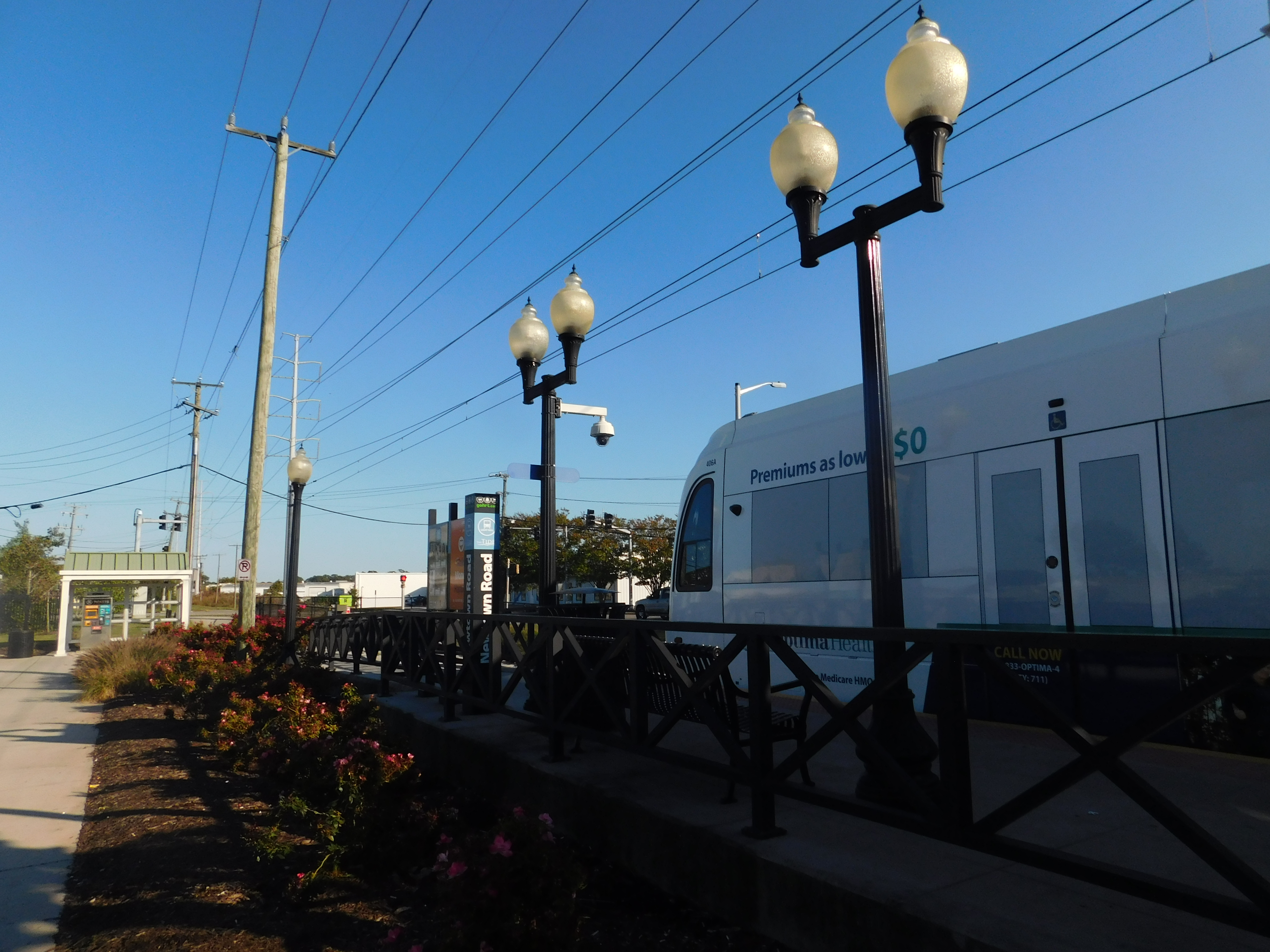
- Newtown Road station in October 2021.

General information
- Location: Newtown Road at Curlew Drive; Norfolk, Virginia
- Owner: Hampton Roads Transit
- Platforms: 1 side platform
- Tracks: 1
- Connections: Hampton Roads Transit: 20, 22, 25, 27, 960

Construction
- Structure type: At-grade
- Parking: 260 spaces
- Cycle facilities: Racks available
- Accessible: yes

History
- Opened: August 19, 2011

Services
| Preceding station | Hampton Roads Transit | Following station |
|---|---|---|
| Military Highway toward EVMC/Fort Norfolk | The Tide | Terminus |
Location

Newtown Road station is a Tide Light Rail station in Norfolk, Virginia. It opened in August 2011 and is situated on Curlew Drive at the city line between Norfolk and Virginia Beach. It is currently the eastern terminus of the line. The station is adjacent to the Interstate Corporate Center and the Sentara Leigh Hospital.
