= EVMC/Fort Norfolk station =

Tide Light Rail station in Norfolk, Virginia

EVMC/Fort Norfolk
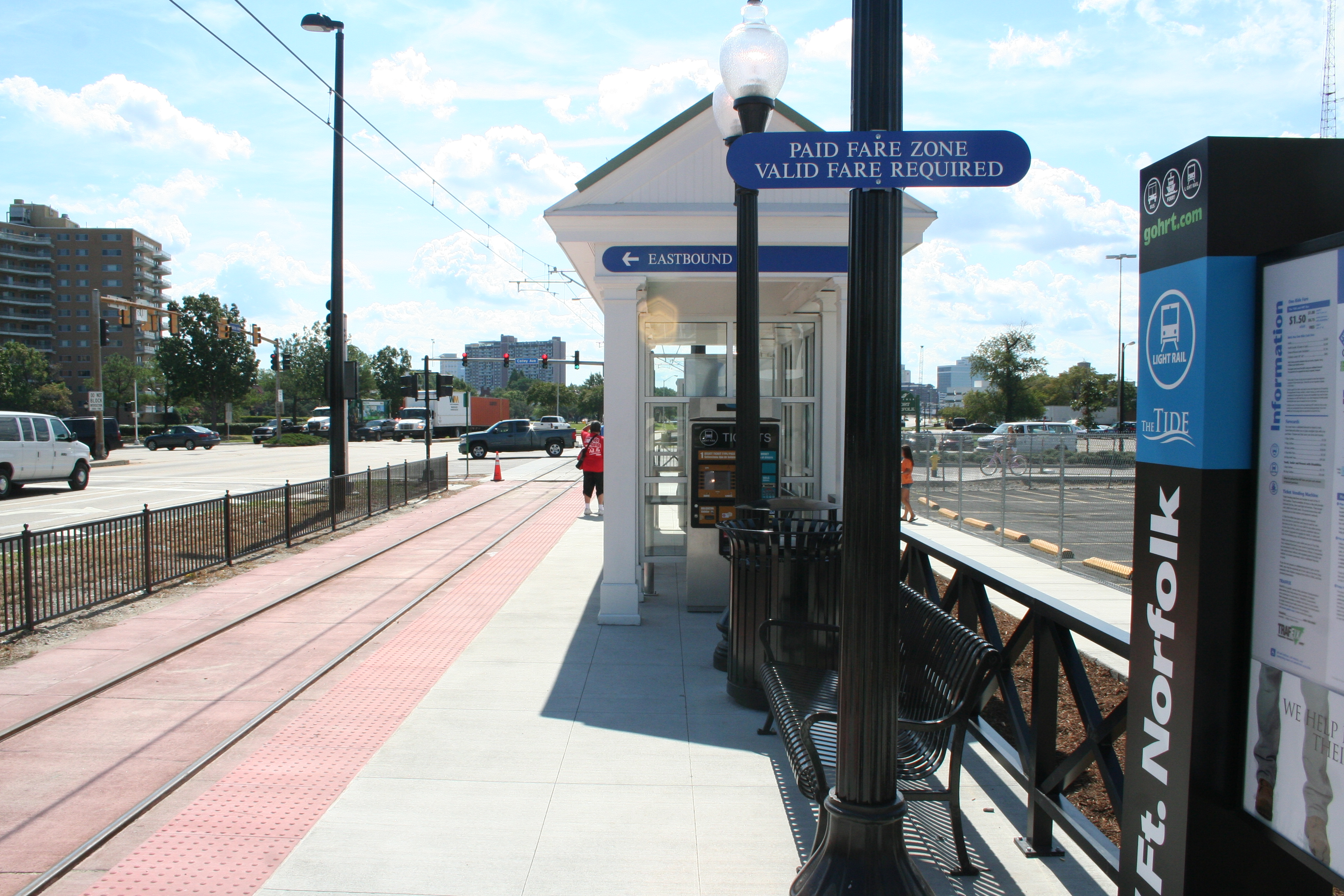

General information
- Location: Brambleton Avenue at Colley Avenue; Norfolk, Virginia
- Coordinates: 36.8588°N 76.3036°W
- Owner: Hampton Roads Transit
- Platforms: 1 side platform
- Tracks: 1
- Connections: Hampton Roads Transit: 2, 23

Construction
- Structure type: At-grade
- Parking: Yes
- Cycle facilities: Racks available
- Accessible: yes

History
- Opened: August 19, 2011

Services
Preceding station	Hampton Roads Transit	Following station
Terminus	The Tide	York Street/Freemason toward Newtown Road
Location

EVMC/Fort Norfolk station is a Tide Light Rail station in Norfolk, Virginia. It opened in 2011 and is the western terminus of the line. It is situated at the intersection of Brambleton and Colley Avenues, just west of downtown and south of the historic Ghent district.

The station serves Eastern Virginia Medical Center (EVMC), consisting of Sentara Norfolk General Hospital, Children's Hospital of the King's Daughters, Eastern Virginia Medical School, the Norfolk Ronald McDonald House, Norfolk Public Health Center and American Red Cross Center, which combined have almost 20,000 employees. This stop also serves Fort Norfolk and the international headquarters for PETA.
