= Hampton Roads Transit =

Transit service in the Hampton Roads region, Virginia

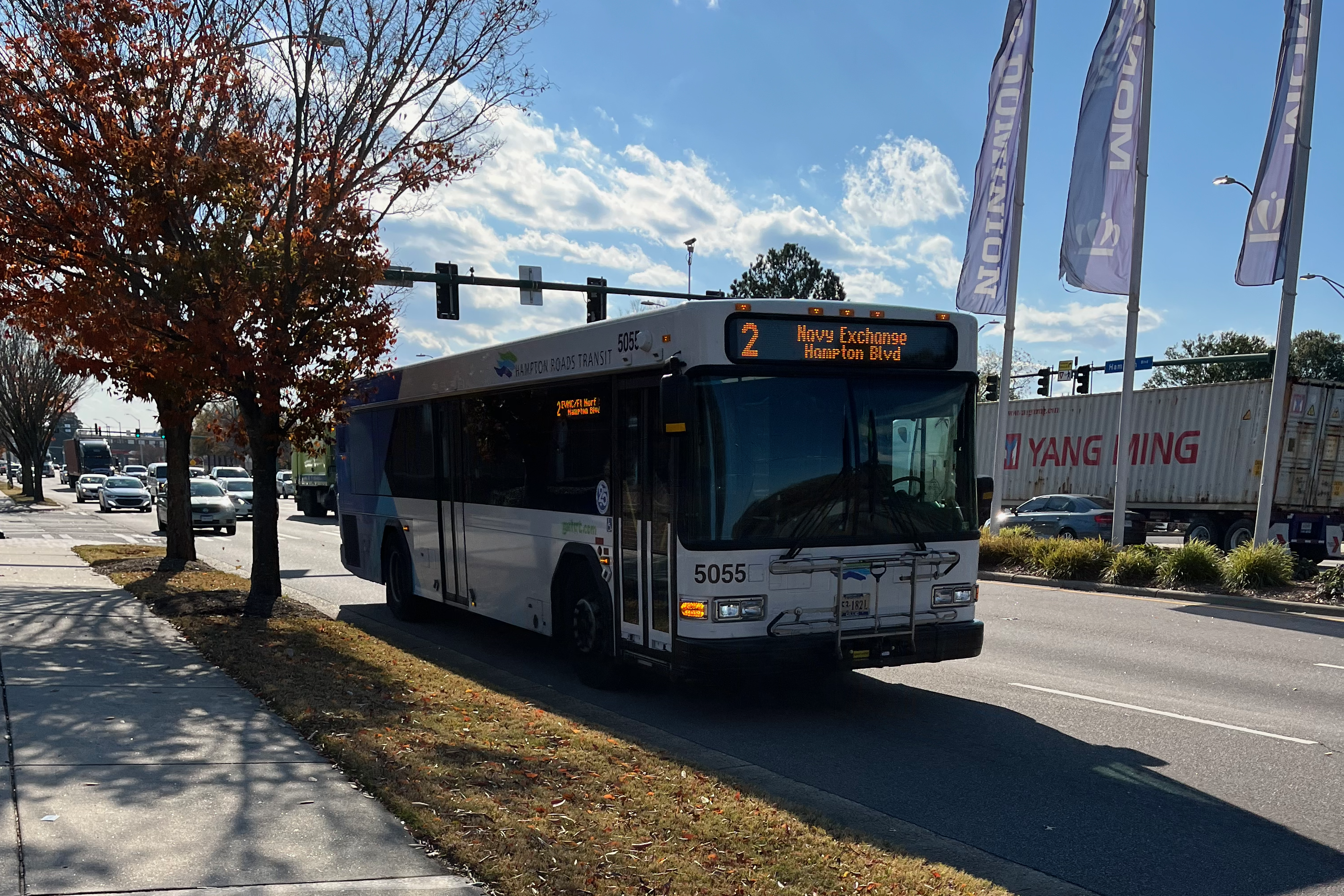
- HRT Route 2 bus near Chartway Arena in December 2024
- Founded: 1999
- Headquarters: 3400 Victoria Blvd. Hampton, VA
- Locale: Hampton Roads
- Service area: Norfolk, Virginia Beach, Chesapeake, Portsmouth, Hampton, Newport News, Smithfield
- Service type: bus service, light rail, ferry, carpool
- Routes: 70
- Hubs: Downtown Norfolk Transit Center (DNTC), Hampton Transportation Center (HTC), Newport News Transportation Center (NNTC)
- Stations: Rail: 11; Ferry: 3 (additional port at Harbor Park for baseball games)
- Fleet: Bus: 300+ Rail: 9 Ferry: 3
- Daily ridership: 33,400 (weekdays, Q2 2026)
- Annual ridership: 9,493,400 (2025)
- Fuel type: Diesel, Diesel-electric
- Chief executive: William E. Harrell
- Website: gohrt.com

Hampton Roads Transit (HRT) is the regional public transit provider for Virginia's Hampton Roads metropolitan area, including the cities of Norfolk, Virginia Beach, Chesapeake, Portsmouth, Hampton, Newport News, Williamsburg, and the town of Smithfield.

HRT serves over 22 million annual passengers within its 369-square-mile (960 km^{2}) service area. In 2025, the system had a ridership of 9,493,400, or about 33,400 per weekday as of the second quarter of 2026. HRT operates The Tide light rail system, buses, ferries, paratransit, and oversees a Transportation demand management program.

== Services ==
=== Bus service ===
Buses provide the bulk of HRT service. HRT operates nearly 60 standard local bus routes, plus multiple special bus services.

Base Express is a free service serving Naval Station Norfolk with two circulator routes. It was introduced in November 2022. The Gold route serves the Naval Exchange bus stop and the inner portion of the base and runs seven days a week with 30 minute frequencies. The Blue route circles the outer portion of the base, including the piers. It runs Monday-Friday with 15 minute frequencies but no weekend service.

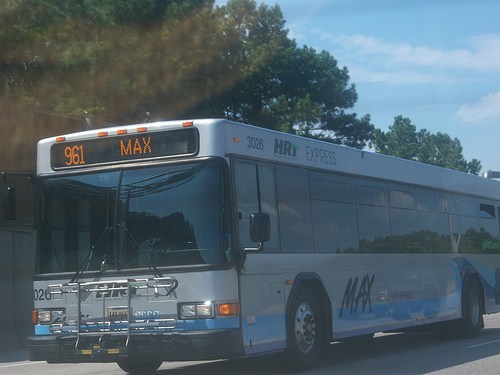
MAX bus on Interstate 664

757 Express, formerly MAX, is an intercity bus service connecting Park and Ride lots to the Downtown Norfolk Transit Center and other major employment locations or activity centers in the region. The Service includes commuter routes, limited-stop routes and regular routes that includes 15-minute frequency during peak hours. There are three regular routes in the program, with more planned as of 2023.

Virginia Beach Wave provides service to the Virginia Beach Oceanfront and related destinations during the tourist season from May through September. Route 30 Atlantic Ave (May 1-October 2 8am-2am, About every 15 minutes) serves the Atlantic Avenue boardwalk. Route 31 Museum Express – (Daily, Memorial Day-Labor Day 9:30 AM until 11:10 PM, About every 15 minutes) Serves the Virginia Aquarium, Ocean Breeze Waterpark, Owl Creek Municipal Tennis Center, Holiday Trav-L-Park Campground, and KOA Campground. Route 35 provides service from Arctic & 19th to Shore Drive & Vista Circle. It serves the Oceanfront, First Landing State Park, North End beaches, Chesapeake Bay beaches and Bayfront restaurants. The route runs from May 21 to October 1 all season long. This route runs daily from 8am to midnight for every 30 minutes from Memorial Day to Labor Day and every weekend from 8am to midnight for every 30 minutes from September 8 to October 1. Former Route 32 Shoppers Express – (Daily, Memorial Day-Labor Day 10am-9pm, About every hour) Served the Shops at Hilltop, and ended at Lynnhaven Mall.

Peninsula Commuter Service offers longer distance commuter buses on four routes.

==== List of bus routes ====
Southside routes

- 1 Downtown Norfolk Transit Center/Joint Expeditionary Base Little Creek
- 2 Navy Exchange Mall/Downtown Norfolk Transit Center
- 3 Downtown Norfolk Transit Center/Ocean View
- 4 Downtown Norfolk/Old Dominion University
- 5 Willoughby/Evelyn Butts
- 6 Downtown Norfolk/South Norfolk/Robert Hall Boulevard
- 8 Downtown Norfolk/Evelyn T. Butts Avenue
- 9 Downtown Norfolk Transit Center/Evelyn T. Butts Avenue
- 11 Downtown Norfolk/Colonial Place
- 12 South Norfolk/TCC Virginia Beach
- 13 Downtown Norfolk/Robert Hall Boulevard/Summit Pointe
- 14 Robert Hall Boulevard/Chesapeake Municipal Center
- 15 Robert Hall Boulevard/Evelyn T. Butts Avenue
- 18 Downtown Norfolk/Hanbury Street and Ballentine Boulevard
- 21 Navy Exchange Mall/Joint Expeditionary Base Little Creek
- 22 Newtown Road Station/Joint Expeditionary Base Little Creek
- 23 Norfolk General/IKEA/JANAF/Military Circle
- 24 Pembroke East/Robert Hall Boulevard
- 25 Military Circle/TCC/Sentara Princess Anne
- 26 TCC Virginia Beach/Lynnhaven Mall
- 27 Newtown Road Station/Pleasure House Road
- 29 Pleasure House Road/Lynnhaven Parkway
- 33 TCC/Atlantic Avenue/68th Street
- 36 Joint Expeditionary Base Little Creek/TCC Virginia Beach
- 41 Downtown Portsmouth/Cradock/Victory Crossing
- 44 Downtown Norfolk Transit Center/Norfolk General Hospital/Airline Boulevard
- 45 Downtown Norfolk Transit Center/Portsmouth/Starmount Parkway
- 47 Downtown Portsmouth/Churchland
- 50 Downtown Portsmouth/Victory Crossing
- 57 Robert Hall Boulevard/Victory Crossing
- 58 Liberty Street and Seaboard Avenue/TCC Chesapeake Campus

VB WAVE routes

- 30 Atlantic Avenue Trolley
- 31 Aquarium and Campgrounds Trolley
- 34 Oceanfront Connector
- 35 Bayfront Trolley

Peninsula routes

- 101 (Kecoughtan) Downtown Newport News/Downtown Hampton
- 102 (Coliseum) Peninsula Town Center/Downtown Hampton
- 103 Downtown Hampton/Downtown Newport News
- 104 (Marshall) Downtown Newport News/Newmarket
- 105 Maple Avenue and 27th Street/Peninsula Town Center
- 106 Newport News/Warwick Boulevard/Denbigh/Fort Eustis
- 107 Newport News/Warwick Boulevard/Patrick Henry Mall
- 108 Riverside Medical Center/Patrick Henry Mall/Lee Hall
- 109 (Pembroke) Downtown Hampton/Buckroe
- 110 Downtown Hampton/Virginia Peninsula Community College
- 111 Virginia Peninsula Community College/Patrick Henry Mall/Woodside Lane
- 115 Buckroe/Willow Oaks/Downtown Hampton
- 118 Downtown Hampton/Virginia Peninsula Community College/Semple Farm Road

Peninsula commuter routes

- 403 Buckroe Shopping Center / Newport News Shipyard
- 405 Newport News Transit Center / Buckroe
- 414 Newport News Transit Center / Jefferson / Oakland
- 415 Newport News Transit Center / Denbigh
- 430 Denbigh Fringe

757 Express routes

- 20 Downtown Norfolk Transit Center/Virginia Beach Oceanfront
- 112 Downtown Newport News / Patrick Henry Mall / Lee Hall
- 114 73rd St. & Warwick Blvd. / Downtown Hampton
- 921 Newport News Transit Center / Patrick Henry Mall / Williamsburg
- 960 Norfolk / Virginia Beach
- 961 Newport News Shipbuilding / Hampton / Norfolk
- 964 Newport News / Smithfield
- 966 Silverleaf Park and Ride / Newport News Transit Center
- 967 Military Highway Station / Newport News Transit Center
- 972 Virginia Beach / Newport News
- 980 Downtown Norfolk Transit Center / Portsmouth / Chesapeake / Suffolk
- 981 Downtown Norfolk Transit Center / Ballentine Station / TCC Virginia Beach / Amazon Virginia Beach

=== The Tide ===
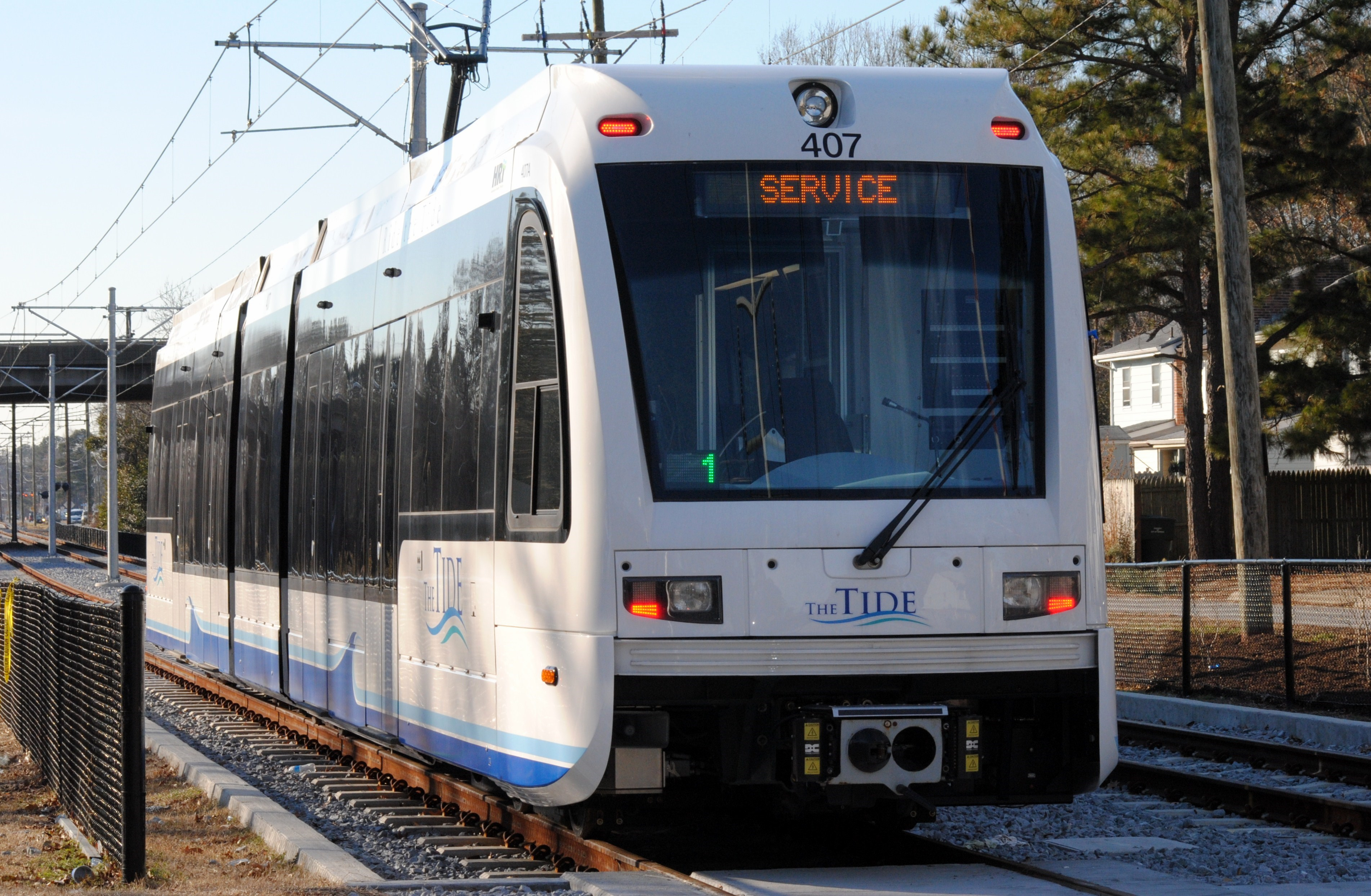
Tide light rail train

HRT owns and operates Virginia's only light rail system. "The Tide" runs 7.4 mi (12 km) in Norfolk from Eastern Virginia Medical School through downtown Norfolk to Newtown Road near the city's eastern boundary.

The Tide runs 15 minute frequencies serving its eleven stations between Fort Norfolk/EVMC Station & Newtown Road Station. Most stations are served with at least one HRT bus route. The Monticello station is a few blocks away from the Downtown Norfolk Transit Center and the Harbor Park stop is adjacent to the Amtrak Norfolk Station (NFK).

Groundbreaking was held on December 8, 2007. Primary construction began in early 2008. The first of nine train sets arrived on October 6, 2009, and the Tide opened for passenger service on August 19, 2011.

=== Paratransit ===
HRT provides ADA Paratransit service, and is available within 3/4 of a mile of regularly scheduled bus routes. Fare is $3.50. Certification and reservations are required. Reservation hours are from 8 a.m. until 5 p.m. daily. Reservations must be made no later than 5:00 PM the day before you need transportation and you can reserve a ride up to 3 days in advance, at this time. (Note: Starting in December 2011, a new delivery system utilizing a mixed use of taxis, involving local taxi companies and dedicated Handi-Ride buses was implemented. This transformation was the result of Hampton Roads Transportation, Inc.'s Frank Azzalina approaching HRT CEO Philip Shucet, and proposing that significant savings in paratransit could be realized if a mixed-use strategy was administered. After a long period of fleet, and routing optimization analysis occurred, the program was eventually put in place. According to the Virginia Pilot - HRT estimates the changes will result in reducing costs by about $500,000 a year, or about $1.25 million for the remainder of its contract with MV Transportation, the company that operates Handi-Ride. The fleet of paratransit buses was trimmed from 87 to 33.)

=== Ferry service ===
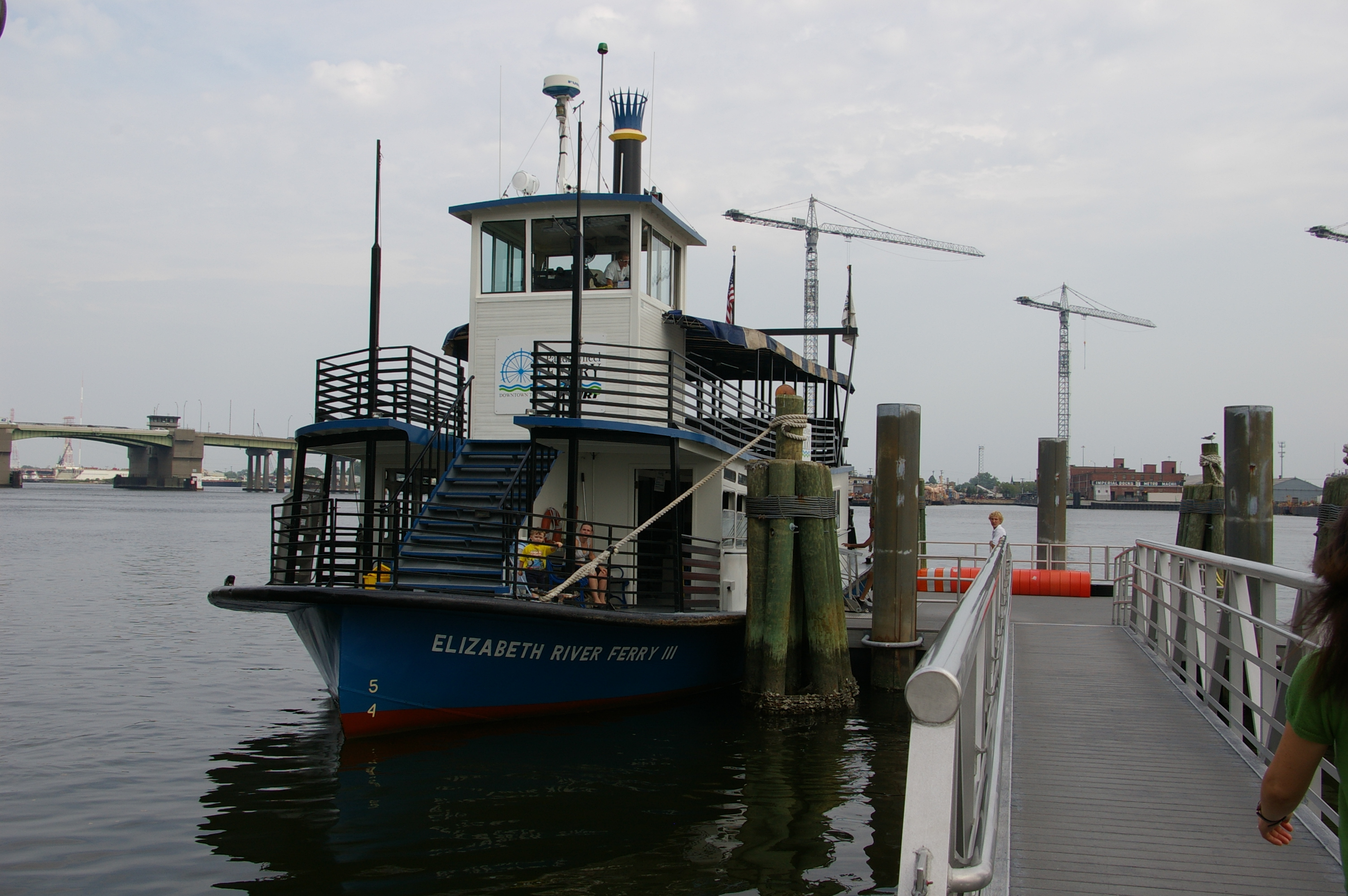
Elizabeth River Ferry III, one of three paddle wheel ferries docked at Waterside Festival Marketplace

HRT operates three paddle wheel ferry boats over the Elizabeth River between Norfolk and Portsmouth.

The Ferry travels between North Landing and High Street in Portsmouth and downtown Norfolk at Waterside District and Harbor Park. Harbor Park is only serviced during Norfolk Tides baseball home games. The ferry's High Street dock is three blocks from Downtown Portsmouth's bus transfer area at County St & Court St.

The ferry operates every 30 minutes, with additional 15-minute service at peak times on weekends from Memorial Day to Labor Day. The Ferry is wheelchair accessible and allows boarding passengers to board with their bicycles. The normal cost to board the ferry is $2.00 for adults, and $1.00 with eligibility ID for youth (age 17 and under), seniors (age 65 and older), and disabled patrons with eligible ID. Round-trip passes may be purchased for $4.00 for adults, with no round-trip option for youth, senior, or disabled patrons. 1-day passes may be purchased as well for $4.50 for adults and $2.25 for youth, seniors, and disabled patrons with eligible ID. Exact fare is required, the crew and fare boxes can not make change.

== Governance and history ==
HRT logo used from 1999 to 2012

HRT was created on October 1, 1999, through the merger of PENTRAN (the Peninsula Transportation District Commission) on the Virginia Peninsula and TRT (Tidewater Regional Transit a.k.a. Tidewater Transit District Commission) in South Hampton Roads.

=== District Commission ===
Hampton Roads Transit is governed by the Transportation District Commission of Hampton Roads (TDCHR). The TDCHR was established in accordance with Chapter 45 of Title 15.2 of the Code of Virginia, as amended, referred to as the Transportation District Act of 1964 and by ordinances adopted by the governing bodies of its component governments.

The commission consists of 13 members, one elected official and one citizen representing each city served by Hampton Roads Transit, and the chairman of the Commonwealth Transportation Board (CTB), or a designee. The Honorable Richard W. "Rick" West (Chesapeake) is the incumbent chair.

There are five established committees that provide input to the governing body. These committees are: Executive Committee, Audit/Budget Review Committee, Operations & Oversight, Planning and New Start Development, Paratransit Committee, and Commission Effectiveness (Ad hoc).

=== Staff leadership ===
William E. Harrell is the president and CEO of Hampton Roads Transit. Harrell went to Hampton Roads Transit from Chesapeake, Virginia, where he was the city manager since June 2007. Harrell replaced interim CEO Phillip A. Shucet on April 2, 2012. Prior to Shucet, Michael Townes served as CEO.

=== Funding ===
Hampton Roads Transit has approximately $30 million dedicated revenue from the Commonwealth of Virginia. Additional funding for service is provided by federal, state, and local funds from member jurisdictions and farebox revenues. Local funding is based on a "Cost Allocation Agreement" in which each city establishes how much service will be provided within its borders based on how much it is willing to pay for services after other revenues are applied. This means that the number of routes, service frequency, and service coverage areas operated by Hampton Roads Transit are determined in each city during the annual budgetary cycle.

=== Corporate timeline ===
NOTE: This section begins with the introduction of rubber-tired buses to the transit operations in Hampton and Newport News, following many years of public transit service performed earlier and during the transition by horse-drawn and electrically powered streetcars utilizing rails embedded in the streets and roads of the area.

Year	Activity	Cities served
1944	The Virginia Transit Company begins operating rubber-wheeled bus service in Hampton Roads.	Norfolk, VA
1945	The Citizens Rapid Transit Company begins operating rubber-wheeled bus service on the Virginia Peninsula, thus ending an era of streetcar service in Hampton Roads.	Newport News, VA and Hampton, VA
January 1973	Tidewater Regional Transit (TRT) service begins, with the creation of the Tidewater Transportation District Commission (TTDC); and acquires the Virginia Transit Company, Norfolk Division	TRT service begins in Norfolk and Virginia Beach
January 1974	Peninsula Transportation District Commission (PTDC) created	
April 1975	PENTRAN service begins, as the PTDC acquires the Citizens Rapid Transit Company	PENTRAN service begins in Newport News and Hampton
May 1975	The TTDC acquires the Community Motor Bus Company of Portsmouth	TTDC expands, with TRT service to Portsmouth, VA
1977	James City County Transit begins service within Colonial Williamsburg and James City County, Virginia	Williamsburg, VA not yet served by PENTRAN, nor TRT until 2004.
late-1970s/early-1980s	Service expansion to Chesapeake, VA, including communities such as South Norfolk, Great Bridge, Western Branch, Deep Creek and to the newly opened Greenbrier Mall	Chesapeake, VA
early-1990s	Service expansion to Suffolk, VA, exclusively to Tidewater Community College and downtown Suffolk	Suffolk, VA
1995	Crossroads service begins, linking the Virginia Peninsula cities with South Hampton Roads with local bus service for the first time in the region since special tunnel buses were discontinued many years earlier.	
October 1, 1999	TRT merges with PENTRAN and forms Hampton Roads Transit (HRT).	HRT begins with bus service already existing in Norfolk, Virginia Beach, Chesapeake, Portsmouth, Newport News, Hampton, and Suffolk.
June 2008	The MAX (Metro Area Express) began service with eight routes linking all six Hampton Roads Cities.	Norfolk (Norfolk Naval Base, Downtown Norfolk), Virginia Beach (Silverleaf, Oceanfront), Chesapeake (Greenbrier Mall, Chesapeake Square Mall), Portsmouth (Downtown), Victory Crossing, Newport News (Transit Center, Northrop Grumman), and Hampton (Transit Center).
August 2011	Virginia's first light rail line Tide Light Rail opens to the public. Passengers were offered free rides from the August 19th grand opening until August 28. More than 30,000 people rode the Tide the first day.	EVMC/Ft. Norfolk, York St./Freemason, Monticello Avenue, MacArthur Square, Harbor Park, Norfolk State University, Ballentine/Broad Creek, Ingleside, Military Highway, and Newtown Road.
January 2012	City of Suffolk withdrew contract with HRT to operate public transit in Suffolk.	
January 2016	Downtown Norfolk Transit Center	Downtown Norfolk Transit Center opens, giving Norfolk a true bus-hub for HRT services. Sixteen bus bays serve the complex. Previous bus hubs were Monticello Avenue (site of the Wells Fargo Tower), the back of Cedar Grove city parking lot (which became a safety issue) & Monticello/Fenchurch as the transit center was being built.
Fall 2022	MAX rebrands as 757 Express	757 Express is a newly expanded service serving commuter routes, limited-stop routes & regular routes having 15-minute peak frequency.

== Expansion ==
=== Proposed Light rail expansion ===
==== Virginia Beach ====
The Virginia Beach Extension Study was started in 2009 in an effort to bring light rail or other rapid transit to Virginia Beach, most likely extending along a freight rail corridor eastward from the existing Newtown Road light rail station.

A Draft Environmental Impact Statement outlining potential alternative alignments and designs was published in 2015. However, progress on the Virginia Beach extension stalled in 2016 when a referendum vote among Virginia Beach residents to build the extension failed. 57% of votes cast opposed building the line, largely due to concerns about taxpayer cost. Had the vote passed, the extension was scheduled to have opened in 2019 or 2020.

==== Naval Station Norfolk ====
In 2012, the City of Norfolk began to study two alternate alignments for extending light rail to Naval Station Norfolk.

The western alignment would serve more of central Norfolk, including Old Dominion University, while the eastern alignment would provide a faster connection to the Naval station from suburban areas including Virginia Beach.

The western alignment was eventually abandoned in favor of continued focus on the eastern alignment. The eastern alignment remains under consideration with planning continuing as the Naval Station Norfolk Transit Corridor Project

=== Bus expansion ===
In 2008, the long-standing central bus transfer area at Monticello Avenue and Charlotte Street was moved to the Cedar Grove lot on Monticello Avenue north of Virginia Beach Blvd., to accommodate the Wachovia development on Monticello Avenue.

In 2016, it was moved again to a new Downtown Norfolk Transportation Center (DNTC) terminal at 434 St. Paul's Blvd., closer to the main downtown district and the Tide's Monticello station. As of 2018, Greyhound planned to move into the facility, as its old terminal was being taken for redevelopment, though there was concern as to whether the new facility would be able to accommodate the intercity service.

In October 2022, HRT launched live route tracking on its website.

== Vehicle fleet ==
As of Summer 2024, free Wi-Fi is available on every bus, trolley, light rail car and ferry.

=== Light rail rolling stock ===
Light rail service is provided by nine Siemens-built S70 vehicles.

Number	Year	Model	Image	Length	Width	Traction Motors	Garage	Notes
401–409	2009	Siemens S70 Light Rail Vehicle						Delivered in October 2009-used since August 2011 when The Tide Light Rail began service.

=== Ferry fleet ===
HRT has three paddle wheel ferries, with two operating in the peak periods. The ferries are named numerically: Elizabeth River Ferry III, Elizabeth River Ferry IV, and Elizabeth River Ferry V. Retired ferries include the James C. Echols (Ferry I) and Elizabeth River Ferry II.

=== Bus and van fleet ===
In May 2024, HRT received 32 new, low-floor model buses from GILLIG, partial fulfillment of an order of 51. There were 21 of the 35-foot models and 11 of the 40-foot versions. The HRT fleet inventory as of December 2024, consisted of 345 vehicles, including 329 diesel buses, 10 trolley-style buses, and 6 battery electric buses. The majority of the fleet, a total of 329 buses, were manufactured by Gillig. The HRT fleet also includes 10 Trolley-style buses manufactured by Hometown Manufacturing.

Hampton Roads Transit's Bus Fleet were originally decorated with all white buses with a two line blue & green wave from the system's former logo which is similar to math's approximate (≈) symbol. New buses since 2006 have a wave going from the back, then becomes smooth through the front and have frameless windows. All MAX buses have a silver background with sky blue & solid blue wave colors. Select buses which had the two-line wave logo have been repainted with the newer back wave design and the exterior window rows are painted black around the windows to resemble the newer buses. Since 2012, several buses were repainted into the silver/blue wave style like the MAX brand with the agency's new stripe logo. Newer buses for the 757 Express Service include a white background with sky-blue and navy-blue triangles connecting at the back. The original 3000 series buses have been re-wrapped to the 757 Express livery.

In addition to its bus fleet, HRT owns a total of 33 paratransit vans. HER is also leasing an additional 54 paratransit vans from its contractor to meet service requirements.

Number	Year	Model	Image	Length	Engine model	Transmission	Fuel	Garage	Notes
2000–2020	2006	Gillig Low Floor		40 feet (12.19 m)	Cummins ISL	Voith D864.3E	Diesel	18th St. Norfolk	First buses with frameless windows
2021–2039	2007	Gillig Low Floor		40 feet (12.19 m)	Cummins ISL	Voith D864.3E	Diesel	Victoria Blvd Hampton; 18th St. Norfolk
3000–3025	2007	Gillig Low Floor		40 feet (12.19 m)	Cummins ISL	Voith D864.5	Clean Diesel	Victoria Blvd Hampton; 18th St. Norfolk	Coach styling MAX buses
2040–2046	2008	Gillig Low Floor		40 feet (12.19 m)	Cummins ISL	Voith D864.5	Clean Diesel	18th St. Norfolk	First buses with square sided windows on bus doors
3026–3035	2008	Gillig Low Floor		40 feet (12.19 m)	Cummins ISL	Voith D864.5	Clean Diesel	Victoria Blvd Hampton; 18th St. Norfolk	Coach styling MAX Express Buses, also equipped with cargo attachments above some seats.
2047–2052	2011	Gillig Low Floor		40 feet (12.19 m)	Cummins ISL9	Voith D864.5	Clean Diesel	Victoria Blvd Hampton
5000–5008	2012	Gillig Low Floor		35 feet (10.67 m)	Cummins ISL9	Voith D864.5	Clean Diesel	18th St. Norfolk	First buses manufactured with the new logo.
5009–5013	2013	Gillig Low Floor		35 feet (10.67 m)	Cummins ISL9	Voith D864.5	Clean Diesel	Victoria Blvd Hampton	Newest regular service buses on HRT's Peninsula fleet.
101–114	2015	Hometown Trolley		35 feet (10.67 m)	Cummins ISB6.7	Allison B300	Clean Diesel	Virginia Beach Garage	New trolleys being used for the Virginia Beach Oceanfront seasonal shuttles
5014–5018	2015–2016	Gillig Low Floor		35 feet (10.67 m)	Cummins ISL9	Voith D864.5	Clean Diesel	Hampton & Norfolk Garages	5014 & 5015 were delivered in mid 2015. 5016, 5017 & 5018 were delivered in late 2015 in a 32-bus order with the 29 2100-series buses. The latter three buses have a plexi-glass compartment to protect bus operators.
2101–2129	2015–2016	Gillig Low Floor		40 feet (12.19 m)	Cummins ISL9	Voith D864.5	Clean Diesel	Hampton & Norfolk Garages	29 of 32 were delivered in late 2015 in part of a 32-bus order. All buses have a plexi-glass compartment to protect bus operators.
2130–2133	2017–2018	Gillig Low Floor		40 feet (12.19 m)	Cummins L9	Voith D864.6	Clean Diesel	Hampton and Norfolk Garages	2130 was being delivered in mid to late 2017 with a Q Straint wheelchair stand. 2131-2133 was being delivered in June 2018 with installed new fareboxes and new technology being installed
5019–5025	2018	Gillig Low Floor		35 feet (10.67 m)	Cummins L9	Voith D864.6	Clean Diesel	Hampton and Norfolk Garages
3101–3105	2018	Gillig Low Floor		40 feet (12.19 m)	Cummins L9	Voith D864.6	Clean Diesel		The new 3100 series Coach styling MAX Bus Express.
4101–4113	2018	Gillig Low Floor		29 feet (8.84 m)	Cummins L9	Voith D864.6	Clean Diesel	Hampton and Norfolk Garages
6001–6006	2020	Proterra Catalyst BE40 E2		40 feet (12.19 m)	UQM HD220 220 kW peak permanent magnet motor	Eaton EEV-7202 2-speed auto-shift EV transmission	Battery Electric	Southside	Newest regular service buses on HRT's Southside fleet. First electric buses for HRT.

On July 18, 2011, it was announced that the Commonwealth of Virginia has signed an umbrella contract with New Flyer Industries for the provision of buses to any Virginia transit authority. It remains to be seen whether or not the contract will include buses for HRT, but highly unlikely due to their contract for Gillig buses.

=== Retired fleet ===
Number	Year	Model	Image	Length	Engine model	Transmission	Fuel	Garage	Notes
901 – 933	1993	Orion 05.501		40 feet (12.19 m)	Detroit Diesel 6V92TA	Allison HT-748	Diesel	18th St. Norfolk	933 has Detroit Diesel Series 50 engine and ZF Transmission.; Retired in August 2011
934 – 949	1995	Orion 05.501		40 feet (12.19 m)	Detroit Diesel 6V92TA	Allison B400R	Diesel	18th St. Norfolk	Retired in August 2011
501 – 534	1995	Gillig Phantom		40 feet (12.19 m)	Detroit Diesel Series 50	Allison B400R	Diesel	Victoria Blvd Hampton; 18th St. Norfolk	Retired in October 2018
1201–1227	1999	Gillig Low Floor		35 feet (10.67 m)	Cummins ISC	Voith D864.3	Diesel	Victoria Blvd Hampton; 18th St. Norfolk	Last buses under Pentran and TRT.; Retired in 2023; 1223 is preserved by Commonwealth Coach and Trolley Museum
1230–1238	2000	Gillig Phantom		40 feet (12.19 m)	Cummins ISC	Voith D864.3	Diesel	18th Street Norfolk	Retired in October 2018
1240–1263	2001	Gillig Phantom		35 feet (10.67 m)	Cummins ISC	Voith D864.3	Diesel	18th Street Norfolk	Retired in October 2019
1301–1304	2000	Gillig Low Floor		29 feet (8.84 m)	Cummins ISL	Voith D864.3	Diesel	18th St Garage	Retired in October 2019
1400–1409	2001	Chance Opus		30 feet (9.14 m)	Cummins ISB	Allison B300R	Diesel	18th St. Norfolk	Several have been refurbished in 2013.; Retired in October 2019
1410, 1415–1416	2006	Optima Opus		30 feet (9.14 m)	Cummins ISB	Allison B300R	Diesel	18th St. Norfolk	1415 & 1416 are the system's first blue background colors, originally test buses for shuttles, however they are used for any regular route in the system.; Retired in October 2019
1500–1516	2002	Gillig Low Floor		35 feet (10.67 m)	Cummins ISC	Voith D864.3	Diesel	Victoria Blvd Hampton; 18th St. Norfolk	1500 was retired due to an accident; 1514 was retired due to fire damage; Retired in 2023
1600–1614	2002	Gillig Low Floor		29 feet (8.84 m)	Cummins ISC	Voith D864.3	Diesel	Victoria Blvd Hampton; 18th St. Norfolk	Retired in 2021
1700–1715	2003	Gillig Phantom		35 feet (10.67 m)	Cummins ISL	Voith D864.3	Diesel	18th St Garage	Retired in October 2019
1800–1810	2004	Gillig Phantom		40 feet (12.19 m)	Cummins ISL	Voith D864.3	Diesel	18th St Garage	Retired in October 2019; Bus 1800 was also used as a MAX Express Bus
1900–1907	2004	Gillig Low Floor		40 feet (12.19 m)	Cummins ISC	Voith D864.3	Diesel	Victoria Blvd Garage	Retired in January 2020
4000–4023	2008	Gillig BRT Hybrid		29 feet (8.84 m)	Cummins ISL	Allison EP40 hybrid system	Diesel-Electric Hybrid	Virginia Beach Trolley Base; 18th St. Norfolk	First hybrids purchased by HRT, usually found in Virginia Beach.; Buses 4015-4023 are the BRT roofed hybrids used for Downtown Norfolk's NET shuttle.; Retired in 2022
4024–4025	2009	Gillig BRT Hybrid		29 feet (8.84 m)	Cummins ISL	Allison EP40 hybrid system	Diesel-Electric Hybrid	Virginia Beach Trolley Base	Retired in 2022
4026–4036	2011	Gillig BRT Hybrid		29 feet (8.84 m)	Cummins ISL9	Allison H 40 EP hybrid system	Diesel-Electric Hybrid	Virginia Beach Trolley Base	Last Hybrid shuttle buses for HRT's fleet; Retired in November 2024
5101–5107	2014	Nova Bus LFS		40 feet (12.19 m)	Cummins ISL9	Allison B400R	Clean Diesel	18th St. Norfolk	Designated specifically for Routes 44, 45, and 47 as part of an effort to improve service along the three routes. Such improvements are being carried out as part of HRT's agreement with Elizabeth River Tunnels.; Retired in November 2024

== Traffix TDM program ==
HRT provides the Traffix Transportation demand management program. It encourages people to use forms of transportation that other than single occupancy cars. Traffix oversees and promotes regional commuter initiatives, including carpooling and remote work by reaching out to area employers. Some of its key clients include the U.S. Navy, Northrop Grumman, Wal-mart, and Canon. To date, Traffix has removed nearly 800 vehicles off the road and has saved consumers over 600,000 gallons of gas and over $1.8 million in vehicle related expenses.

== See also ==
- Transportation in Hampton Roads
- Light rail in the United States
