= Pembroke Manor, Virginia =

Pembroke Manor
- Unincorporated area
- Location within the state of Virginia Pembroke Manor (the United States)
- Coordinates: 36°51′8″N 76°8′10″W
- Country: United States
- State: Virginia
- Independent city: Virginia Beach
- Time zone: UTC−5 (Eastern (EST))
  - Summer (DST): UTC−4 (EDT)

Pembroke Manor (also known as Pembroke) is an area in the independent city of Virginia Beach, Virginia, United States located around the intersections of Virginia Beach Boulevard (U.S. Route 58) and Independence Boulevard (State Route 225). The community's name comes from Pembroke Manor, a plantation built in 1764. The house was donated by the Aragona family to the Princess Anne Historical Society, However, it is currently under private ownership and operates as Ivy League Academy, a private Christian school catering to children from K4 through 5th grade. It has since been sold and repurposed for another business. The building itself was listed on the National Register of Historic Places in 1970 as #70000887 and is considered one of the oldest and most notable structures in the City of Virginia Beach.

One of the first developments of the area was Princess Anne High School, which opened in 1954. The neighborhood was characterized by Pembroke Mall, originally its only regionally recognizable landmark, after its opening in 1966. Anchor Pembroke Mall department stores included Miller & Rhoads and Sears, with regional retailers like Willner's and Hofheimer's joining national chains like Radio Shack and F. W. Woolworth. The mall was eventually overshadowed by the Lynnhaven Mall, in the Lynnhaven section of the city after its opening in 1981. Through the late 1980s and early 1990s, the intersection at Pembroke Manor was criticized by urban planner and architect Andres Duany for its pedestrian unfriendliness. Now, however, Pembroke Manor is home to many new high-end shops and restaurants due to the public-private Virginia Beach Town Center project, which has the feel of new urbanism. The Town Center Project's goal is to revitalize the Pembroke Manor area and create a modern 'downtown' area in what has become one of the city's core business districts.

In moving the traditional focus of the city away from the Oceanfront, Virginia Beach's resort area, the city hopes to revitalize itself. Town Center currently has two high rise towers, the Armada Hoffler Tower (named for the developer) and The Westin Virginia Beach Town Center tower, with more in the works. A luxury apartment building, the Cosmopolitan, has been built as part of the project, as well as several restaurants and a performing arts center.

The land that Pembroke Manor was built upon was given to Captain Adam Thoroughgood in a land grant in 1635. The land was subsequently divided among heirs and sold over the generations. Elizabeth Thoroughgood, descendant of the original owner, married Jonathan Saunders who built Pembroke Manor in 1764. He died the following year, and his grave can still be seen today in the cemetery at Old Donation Church nearby off of Witchduck Road. Jonathan Saunders willed his new home to his son Captain John Saunders who was the ward of Rose Hall owner Mr. Jacob Ellegood. In Fall 1775 under the direction of Royal Governor Dunmore, Mr. Ellegood raised the Queen's Own Loyal Virginia Regiment to aid in the number of Crown Forces in Tidewater Virginia. Other forces included the so-called Ethiopian Regiment and regular Crown Forces. The then Colonel Ellegood recruited his ward to join the QOLVR. Captain Saunders was a Loyalist who was so open about his support for the cause of the crown that in 1779 he was called before the Princess Anne Committee of Safety and declared a British Subject, and was evicted from Pembroke Manor and the colonies. After their defeat at the Battle of Great Bridge in December 1775, the members of the Regiment remained on-board ships in the Chesapeake Bay and Hampton Roads until the next summer of 1776 whereby they moved northward and were assimilated into the Queen's Rangers. Saunders would go on to minor successes throughout the rest of the War and after settle in Nova Scotia, New Brunswick, Canada never to see his Pembroke Manor again.

== See also ==
- John Saunders (New Brunswick judge)

Captain Jonathan Saunders grave is NOT at the Old Donation Church, only the gravestone is there. His grave and the graves of other family members remain in the family plot on the east side of the manor, presently being used as a family vegetable garden, even though it is fenced off. Additionally, the house was built facing the Lynnhaven River and had a tunnel running from the house to that river. The house is located on Constitution Road just off Independence Blvd. Many names of its builders can be seen etched in its masonry.
