= Regency Mall (Richmond, Virginia) =

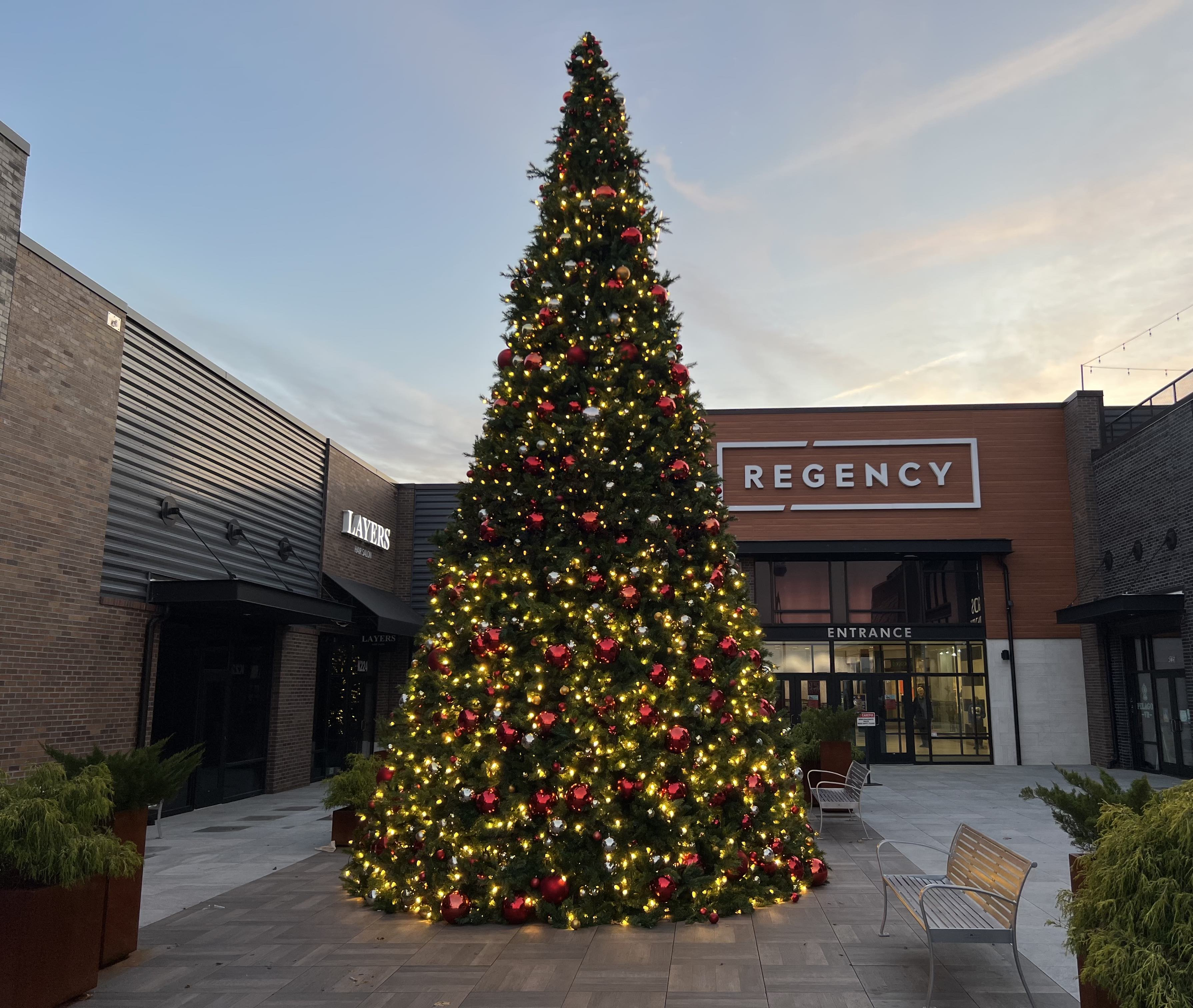
- Regency Mall entrance, December 2024
- Location: Henrico, Virginia, United States
- Coordinates: 37.601345°N 77.567726°W
- Address: 1420 Parham Road
- Opened: October 16, 1975; 51 years ago
- Developer: Leonard Farber
- Manager: Cushman and Wakefield Thalhimer
- Owner: Thalhimer, Rebkee Co
- Num. of stores: 60+
- Num. of anchor tenants: 4 (2 open, 2 vacant, 1 demolished)
- Floor area: 820,000 square feet (76,180.5 m^{2})
- Floors: 2
- Parking: Covered and parking decks
- Website: www.shopregencymall.com

Regency Mall is an enclosed shopping mall outside of Richmond, Virginia in unincorporated Henrico County, Virginia, United States. Opened in 1975 as Regency Square, the mall features a food court and more than 60 tenants, currently with no anchors. Macy's, which had two locations at Regency Square, closed in spring 2016, Sears closed in summer 2017, and JCPenney closed in fall 2020. Forever 21 closed in early 2020 as part of that brand's restructuring plan.

== History ==
Regency Square opened in 1975. It was developed by Leonard Farber of Pompano Beach, Florida in conjunction with local developer E. Carlton Wilton.

At the mall's opening, anchor stores included JCPenney, Sears, Miller & Rhoads and Thalhimer's. Besides the addition of a food court in 1987, the mall remained largely unchanged. After Miller & Rhoads closed in 1990, Hecht's bought the location, along with three other former Miller & Rhoads stores in Virginia, and converted it to a Hecht's. Two years later, the Thalhimer's chain was also acquired by Hecht's, and as a result, the Thalhimer's became a second Hecht's location.

In 1991, Wilton sold the mall to Prudential. Taubman Centers then acquired the Regency Square mall in 1997. A children's play place was added in 2003.

On September 9th, 2006, both Hecht’s locations converted to Macy’s stores after Federated Department Stores absorbed Hecht’s parent company.

In January 2012, Taubman returned the mall to its mortgage lender to avoid foreclosure on the property. The lender hired Jones Lang LaSalle for management of the property.

In February 2015, Thalhimer Realty Partners and The Rebkee Company, both local companies, bought Regency for 13.1 million. The new owners plan to revitalize the mall while keeping it focused on retail.

In 2016, Macy's closed both of its stores at Regency Square as part of a plan to close 40 stores nationwide .

In September 2017, Sears closed its store at Regency Square as part of a plan to close 16 stores nationwide. This left JCPenney as the mall's only original anchor.

The same month, an overpass over one of the mall's entrances was demolished, starting work on a 30 million dollar renovation of the mall. It will remove the parking deck on the second story of the mall, making its parking space completely level. Regal Entertainment Group will move into the former Macy's spaces as well.

In September 2019, Forever 21 announced that it would be closing its two-level store at Regency Square after filing for Chapter 11 bankruptcy.

In early 2020, the abandoned Sears store was demolished for construction of a new 320-unit apartment complex.

On August 20, 2020, it was announced that JCPenney would close in November 2020 as part of a plan to close 155 stores nationwide. The structure was purchased from JCPenney by the owners of the mall for $3 million for redevelopment.

On October 10, 2020, Surge Trampoline Park opened in the top floor of the former Macy's North building.

Henrico County opened a new Adult Education Center in the bottom of Regency Mall in 2022.

== Competition with other malls ==
Regency Square faced additional retail competition in 2003, when two other malls opened nearby: Short Pump Town Center and Stony Point Fashion Park, the latter also a Taubman property.
