= River Ridge Mall =

- Location: Lynchburg, Virginia, United States
- Coordinates: 37.3652°N 79.1785°W
- Opened: 1980
- Developer: Faison
- Manager: JLL
- Owner: Liberty University
- Num. of stores: 67
- Num. of anchor tenants: 5
- Floor area: 423,132 square feet (39,000 m^{2})
- Floors: 1 (2 in Belk)

River Ridge Mall is an enclosed shopping mall in Lynchburg, Virginia. Opened in 1980, the mall features JCPenney, Belk, Dick's Sporting Goods, TJ Maxx, and Regal Cinemas as its primary anchors, with HomeGoods, and Planet Fitness serving as secondary anchors. Three restaurant outparcels include Red Lobster, Taco Bell, and a local restaurant named Shakers, with a fourth outparcel being developed as a 7 Brew that will open in 2025. A Residence Inn by Marriott is the mall's first on-site hotel.

The mall is owned by Liberty University and is managed by the Jones Lang LaSalle (JLL) group.

== History ==
River Ridge Mall opened in 1980 with Miller & Rhoads and Thalhimers. Sears and Leggett (now Belk) opened in 1981. JCPenney opened in 1983. Miller & Rhoads closed and became Montgomery Ward in 1990, which closed in 1997 and became Value City in 1999. In 1992, the Thalhimer's store was converted to Hecht's, which in turn became Macy's in 2006. CBL & Associates Properties acquired the mall from Faison in 2003.

Value City closed in 2008 and was demolished for a new movie theater. As a result, the existing theater complex became a Planet Fitness. Jo-Ann Fabrics opened at the mall in November 2012, followed by TJ Maxx in April 2013. Also in 2013, the Sears store closed. It was purchased by Liberty University, who planned to convert to a civic center, but engineers found the site unsuitable. On March 18, 2016, it was announced that Liberty University had purchased a 75% ownership position in the mall.

In February 2016, it was announced that Marriott was building a Residence Inn on the spot the former Montgomery Ward Tire & Auto building which had been vacant for some time. This is the first hotel constructed at the mall property, and one of only 4 outparcels at the mall.

On January 4, 2017, Macy's announced the River Ridge location would be one of 100 underperforming stores it would be closing. Liberty University, majority owner of the mall, announced they would purchase the Macy's building and have been in talks with a new unnamed tenant for the property, pending closure on the agreement. In the same statement, former Liberty chancellor Jerry Falwell, Jr., confirmed that the former Sears building would be demolished and replaced with an outdoor shopping experience. Both the new tenant for the former Macy's location and construction on the former Sears property are part of the university's overall plans for redevelopment of the shopping center.

In 2019, River Ridge Mall tore down both the old Macy's location and the former Sears property as part of an ongoing renovation effort. In place of the old Sears location, they opened a new outdoor Mall. In 2020, Dick's Sporting goods opened as an anchor store in the new outdoor section of the mall. In place of the former Macy's, River Ridge Mall added an outdoor grassy event venue as well as some outside facing stores. In 2023 Duck Donuts and a local Mexican restaurant called Papa Gallo Cocina Mexicana opened there.

In October 2021, River Ridge Mall opened the doors of the refurbished food hall. The new food hall features seven restaurants. Two of them, Chick-Fil-A and Farmers Garden, predate the renovation. Auntie Anne's and Cinnabon feature as a combo location just outside the entrance to the food hall. Newly opened in 2021 are ZaZa Stone Fire Pizza, Mein Bowl (an Asian restaurant), and Grounded (serving hand-crafted burgers). These three units are all operated by Sodexo as an extension of their existing contract to run dining services for Liberty University.
