= Fashion Square =

Fashion Square or Fashion Square Mall may refer to any of the following shopping malls in the United States:

- Fashion Square Mall in Saginaw, Michigan
- Charlottesville Fashion Square in Charlottesville, Virginia
- Orlando Fashion Square in Orlando, Florida
- Scottsdale Fashion Square in Scottsdale, Arizona
- Westfield Fashion Square, formerly Sherman Oaks Fashion Square, in Sherman Oaks, California
