= Virginia State Route 225 =

State highway in the City of Virginia Beach, Virginia, US

State Route 225
- Independence Boulevard

Route information
- Maintained by VDOT
- Length: 5.40 mi (8.69 km)
- Existed: mid-1960s–present

Major junctions
- South end: South Boulevard in Virginia Beach
- I-264 in Virginia Beach; US 58 in Virginia Beach; SR 190 in Virginia Beach; US 13 in Virginia Beach
- North end: US 60 in Virginia Beach

Location
- Country: United States
- State: Virginia
- Counties: City of Virginia Beach

Highway system
- Virginia Routes; Interstate; US; Primary; Secondary; Byways; History; HOT lanes
← SR 224	→ SR 226

State Route 225 (SR 225) is a primary state highway in the U.S. state of Virginia. Known as Independence Boulevard, the state highway runs 5.40 miles (8.69 km) from South Boulevard north to U.S. Route 60 (US 60) within the independent city of Virginia Beach. SR 225 connects Interstate 264 (I-264) with US 58 in the Pembroke Manor area of the city and with US 13 near Naval Amphibious Base Little Creek and the Chesapeake Bay Bridge-Tunnel. The unnumbered portion of Independence Boulevard to the south connects those areas with the Princess Anne section of the city.

== Route description ==
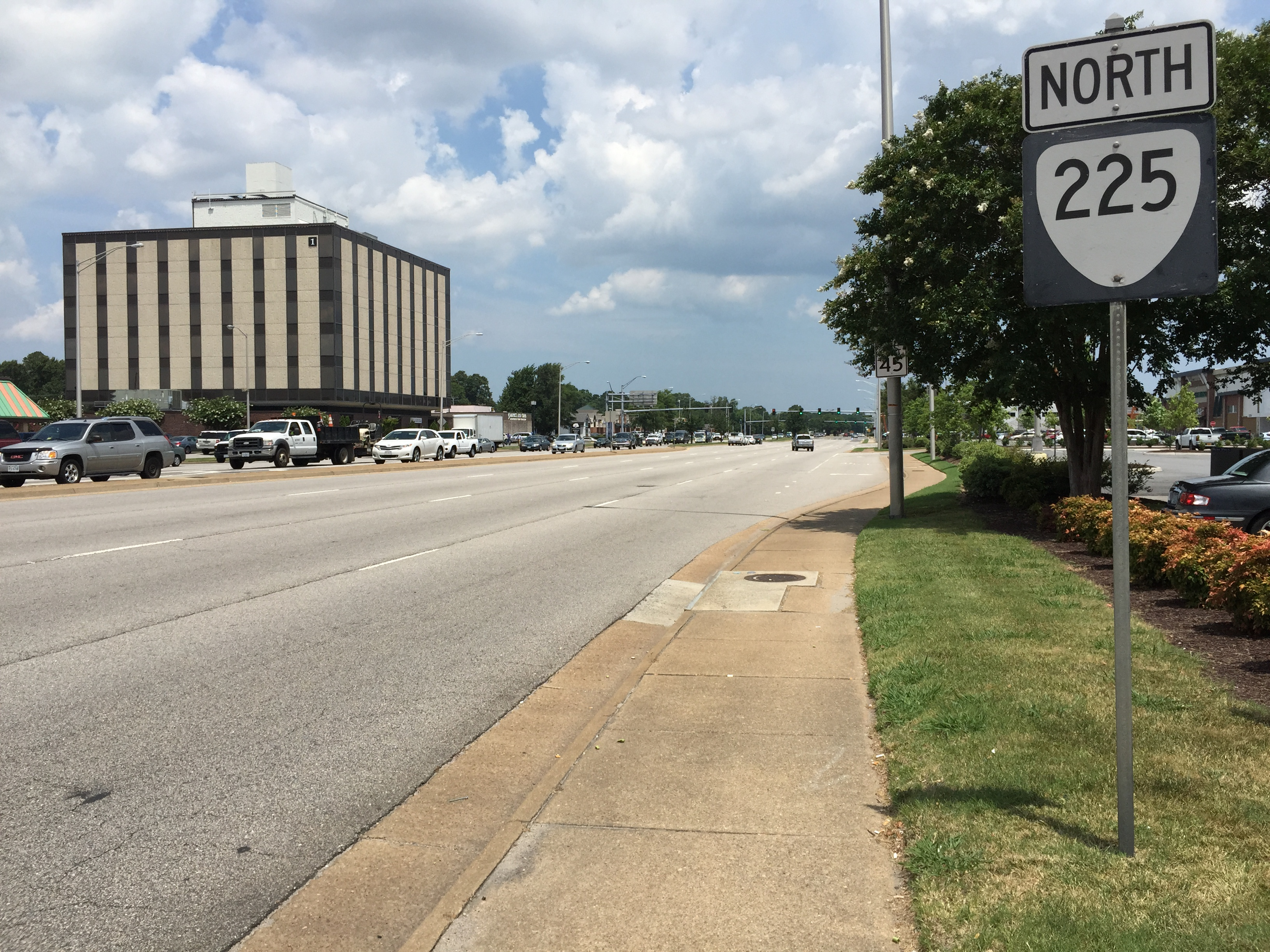
View north along SR 225 at US 58 in Virginia Beach

SR 225 begins at a four-leg intersection with South Boulevard, which parallels I-264 east from the intersection; Baxter Road, which heads southwest toward the Kempsville area of Virginia Beach; and Independence Boulevard, which continues southeast as an eight-lane divided highway toward the city offices in the Princess Anne section of the city. The eight-lane state highway immediately encounters a cloverleaf interchange with I-264 (Virginia Beach Expressway). The ramp from eastbound I-264 to Independence Boulevard splits, with one leg passing over Baxter Road to merge with the southbound direction south of SR 225's terminus. North of I-264, SR 225 passes through the Pembroke Manor section of Virginia Beach, which serves as the city's downtown. The state highway passes Virginia Beach Town Center, a mixed-use area that features the Westin Virginia Beach Town Center, a hotel that is the tallest building in Virginia, and the Pembroke Mall. Between the two shopping destinations is SR 225's junction with US 58 (Virginia Beach Boulevard), an at-grade intersection of two eight-lane divided highways.

North of US 58, SR 225 reduces to six lanes and crosses the Thurston Branch of the Western Branch of the Lynnhaven River before meeting the northern end of SR 190 (Pembroke Boulevard). East of its intersection with Witchduck Road is historic Old Donation Episcopal Church. SR 225 passes another cluster of shopping centers at its junction with Haygood Road, where the highway becomes four lanes. The state highway passes between multiple densely populated suburban residential subdivisions on its way to the Little Creek area of Virginia Beach. SR 225 meets US 13 (Northampton Boulevard) at a cloverleaf interchange southwest of where US 13 crosses the Chesapeake Bay on the Chesapeake Bay Bridge-Tunnel. The state highway reaches its northern terminus at US 60 (Shore Drive) on the southern edge of Naval Amphibious Base Little Creek. Independence Boulevard continues north as an unnumbered road onto the military base.

== Major intersections ==
The entire route is in Virginia Beach.

mi	km	Destinations	Notes
0.00	0.00	South Independence Boulevard / Baxter Road / South Boulevard	Southern terminus; former SR 410 south
0.07	0.11	I-264 to I-64 – Norfolk, Richmond, Oceanfront	Exit 17 (I-264)
0.80	1.29	US 58 (Virginia Beach Boulevard)	
2.15	3.46	SR 190 south (Pembroke Boulevard) – Ferry Plantation House	
4.87	7.84	US 13 – Norfolk, Chesapeake Bay Bridge-Tunnel	Cloverleaf interchange
5.40	8.69	US 60 (Shore Drive) / Independence Boulevard – Little Creek Amphibious Base	Northern terminus
1.000 mi = 1.609 km; 1.000 km = 0.621 mi
