= Pembroke Square (Virginia) =

Pembroke Mall
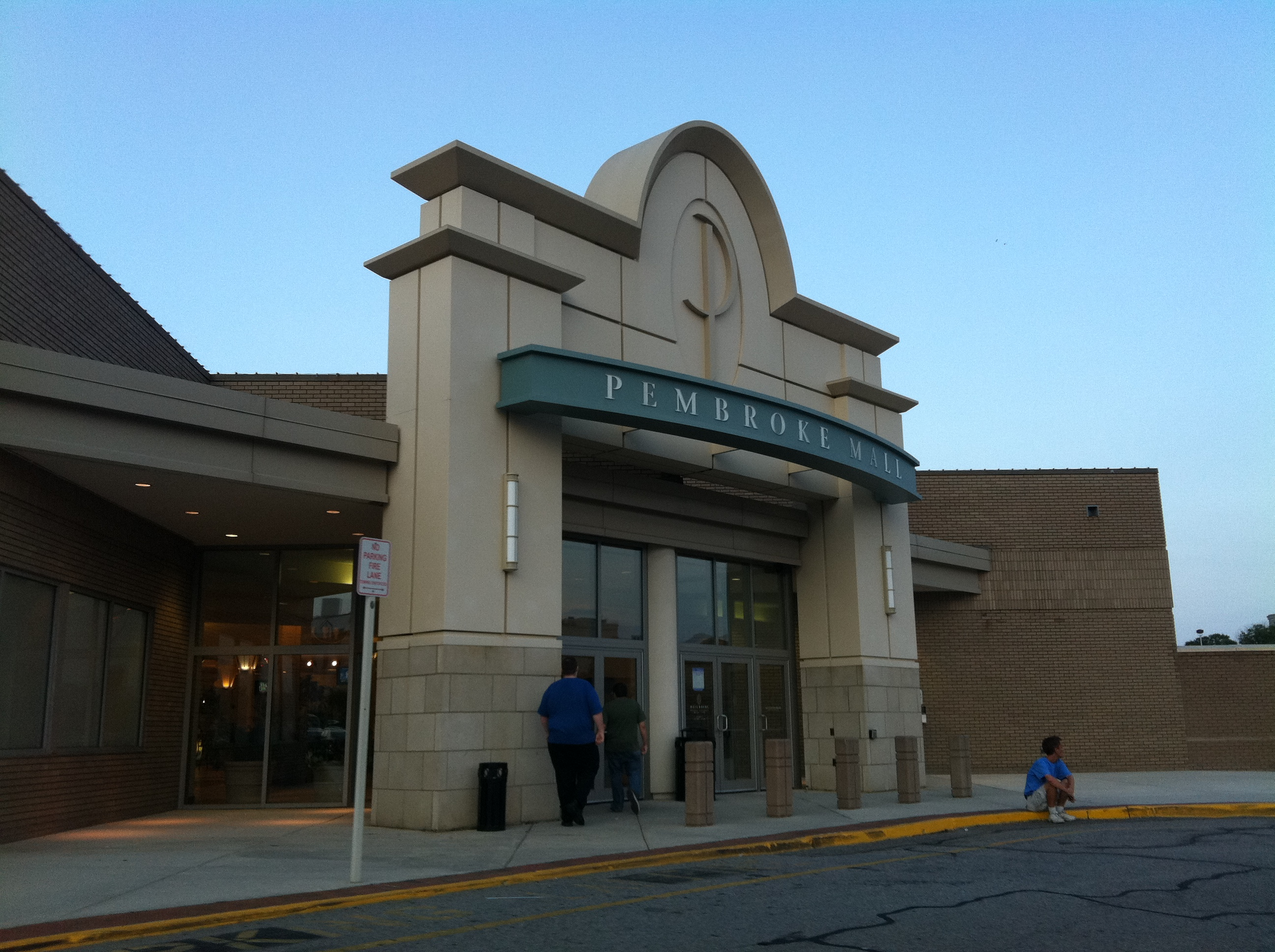
- Entrance to Pembroke Mall, July 2011
- Location: Virginia Beach, Virginia, United States
- Coordinates: 36°50′44″N 76°8′3.2″W
- Address: 4554 Virginia Beach Blvd
- Opened: March 21, 1966
- Closed: January 31, 2022
- Developer: Pembroke Square Associates
- Manager: Pembroke Mall
- Num. of stores: 48
- Num. of anchor tenants: 5
- Floor area: 623,479 square feet (57,923.1 m^{2})
- Floors: 1
- Website: pembrokemall.com

Pembroke Square is a mixed-use retail development located in Virginia Beach, Virginia, United States. It opened in March 1966 as Pembroke Mall the first shopping mall in the Hampton Roads metro area. It comprised more than 48 stores, including anchor stores Target, Kohl's, Nordstrom Rack, The Fresh Market, and DraftCade.

== History ==
The site of Pembroke Mall was originally occupied by farmland. Construction began on the mall in March 1965. A year later, the mall's first 21 stores opened to the public. Sears and Miller & Rhoads, respectively the western and eastern anchor stores, opened shortly afterward. Besides these two anchor stores, the mall also featured a Woolworth dime store near the middle.

A 1981 expansion added local department store Rices Nachmans as a third anchor store. Four years later, Allentown, Pennsylvania-based Hess's acquired the Rices Nachmans chain and re-branded all stores as Hess's.

Miller & Rhoads closed its location at Pembroke Mall in 1990, and within a year, the former Miller & Rhoads space was replaced with Uptons, a chain based in Atlanta, Georgia. Hess's sold its Hampton Roads area stores to Proffitt's in 1993 and subsequently, Proffitt's sold all of its area stores to Dillard's in 1998. Stein Mart was also added as an anchor next to Uptons in the mid-1990s.

By the mid-1990s, Pembroke Mall started to lose tenants, primarily to newer, larger, and better malls in the area such Lynnhaven Mall and MacArthur Center. In 1997, the entire Woolworth chain was shuttered, leaving a large vacancy in the mall, and two years later, Uptons closed as well, followed by Dillard's in 2002.

== Redevelopment ==
In 2003, the mall's management embarked on a mall-wide redevelopment. New floor tiles were laid throughout the entire concourse, and several restaurants opened on the periphery. Kohl's, a department store chain based in Wisconsin, opened its first Hampton Roads location in the former Uptons space that year. Other additions included a food court in the mall's southern wing, as well as several national chain tenants, such as Pacific Sunwear and Hot Topic. Freight Liquidators, a local furniture store, also briefly operated in the former Dillard's space. In 2006, most of the mall's northern wing (including the former Dillard's) was demolished. The movie theater closed in 2011 (operations were concentrated to the nearby Regal Columbus Stadium 12). The theater was torn down for a Target store which also took up the space of the former Dillard's. The food court annex was torn down in 2012. In 2013, the former food court became Old Navy and Coastal Edge (Old Navy is only accessible from the outside), and an Off Broadway Shoe Warehouse was added at the site of the former Woolworth's, restoring the original interior/exterior access.

In 2015, Sears Holdings spun off 235 of its properties, including the Sears at Pembroke Mall, into Seritage Growth Properties.

In 2015, it was announced that the Sears store would be downsized, with portions of it to be leased to Nordstrom Rack, The Fresh Market, and DSW Shoe Warehouse. Only Sears is accessible from the mall interior. The detached Sears Automotive building has been replaced with a freestanding REI store. Truist Financial and Smokey Bones operate outparcels on the Seritage site.

On June 28, 2018, it was announced that Sears would be closing as part of a plan to close 78 stores nationwide. The store closed in September 2018. The space was later replaced by offices for the software company Decisions LLC in 2021.

On August 12, 2020, Stein Mart announced it would close most, and possibly all, of its brick-and-mortar stores. The Pembroke Mall Stein Mart is on the closure list. Stein Mart closed the Pembroke Mall location to the public on October 25, 2020.

In December 2021, the mall announced that the 48 remaining tenants must vacate by the end of January 2022, as part of a $200 million redevelopment deal. The new development, scheduled to be completed in 2024, will include a hotel, senior living, and apartments. Target and Kohl's currently remain open during construction.

In July 2022, it was announced that the center would be renamed Pembroke Square, due to the redevelopment of the mall.

On January 22, 2026, DraftCade an arcade and restaurant opened in one of the anchor spaces. This was part of the redevelopment of some of the vacant anchors and adding an entertainment component to the mall.
