= Greenbrier Mall =

- Location: Chesapeake, Virginia, United States
- Coordinates: 36°46′45.6″N 76°13′38.8″W
- Address: 1401 Greenbrier Parkway South
- Opened: October 7, 1981; 45 years ago
- Developer: Homart Development
- Manager: CBRE
- Owner: CBRE
- Floor area: 898,416 square feet (83,465.6 m^{2})
- Floors: 2
- Website: greenbriermall.com

Greenbrier Mall is a nearly 900,000 sq ft (84,000 m^{2}) regional mall in Chesapeake, Virginia, United States in the Hampton Roads metropolitan area. The mall has a hillside terrain, with entries on both upper and lower levels. It serves communities on the East Coast in the states of Virginia and North Carolina.

== History ==
The mall's original anchors were Miller & Rhoads (sold to Hecht's in 1990) and Sears. Hess's was added in 1987. Leggett, a division of Belk, opened on September 7, 1988.

Proffitt's, which acquired the former Hess's in 1993, was sold to Dillard's in 1996. The Leggett store briefly operated as Belk before it was traded to Dillard's in 1998 as part of a mutual exchange. The former Belk became a men's and children's auxiliary store.

In 2003, Greenbrier Mall underwent an extensive renovation. Dillard's consolidated both stores to the former Proffitt's at the east end with a 160,000 square feet (15,000 m^{2}) reconstruction. In addition, the mall received a new color scheme and its current "G" mall logo, and the former Leggett/Belk/Dillard's building was converted to JCPenney.

In April 2004, during the renovation, CBL & Associates acquired the mall from Gregory Greenfield & Associates, Ltd. for $102.5 million. A year later, the new JCPenney department store was completed, and officially opened at the north end of the mall. In 2006, as part of a nationwide transition, Hecht's was rebranded as Macy's.

In 2015, Sears Holdings spun off 235 of its properties, including the Sears at Greenbrier Mall, into Seritage Growth Properties.

On June 28, 2018, Sears announced that its store would be closing as part of a plan to close 78 stores nationwide. The store closed in September 2018.

In 2019, Gameworks, formerly Jillians, announced it would move to MacArthur Center by spring 2020. However the plans were shelved due to the closure of all (except 1) of their locations.

In 2020, a Rosie's Gaming Emporium, a bar, four restaurants, and a hotel was proposed to take the lot formerly occupied by Sears. On September 15, 2020, Chesapeake City Council withdrew the proposal because of traffic concerns on two intersections along Greenbrier Pkwy, Crosssways Blvd, and Eden Way North.

On March 10, 2022, the mall was placed into receivership with CBL & Associates anticipating returning the property to the lender. The property officially transferred to the lender in October 2022.

On February 27, 2025, a three-day auction began for Greenbrier Mall. On April 4, 2025, Michael Sifen through Sifen's company, Sifen, Inc, was announced as winner of the auction.

In January, 2026, plans were announced to convert the former Sears anchor space into a Costco wholesale store along with a gas station. The new store is expected to employ 200 people and open sometime in 2027.
