= Stonebridge Shopping Center =

Shopping mall in Chesterfield County, Virginia, U.S.

Coordinates: 37°29′58″N 77°31′38″W

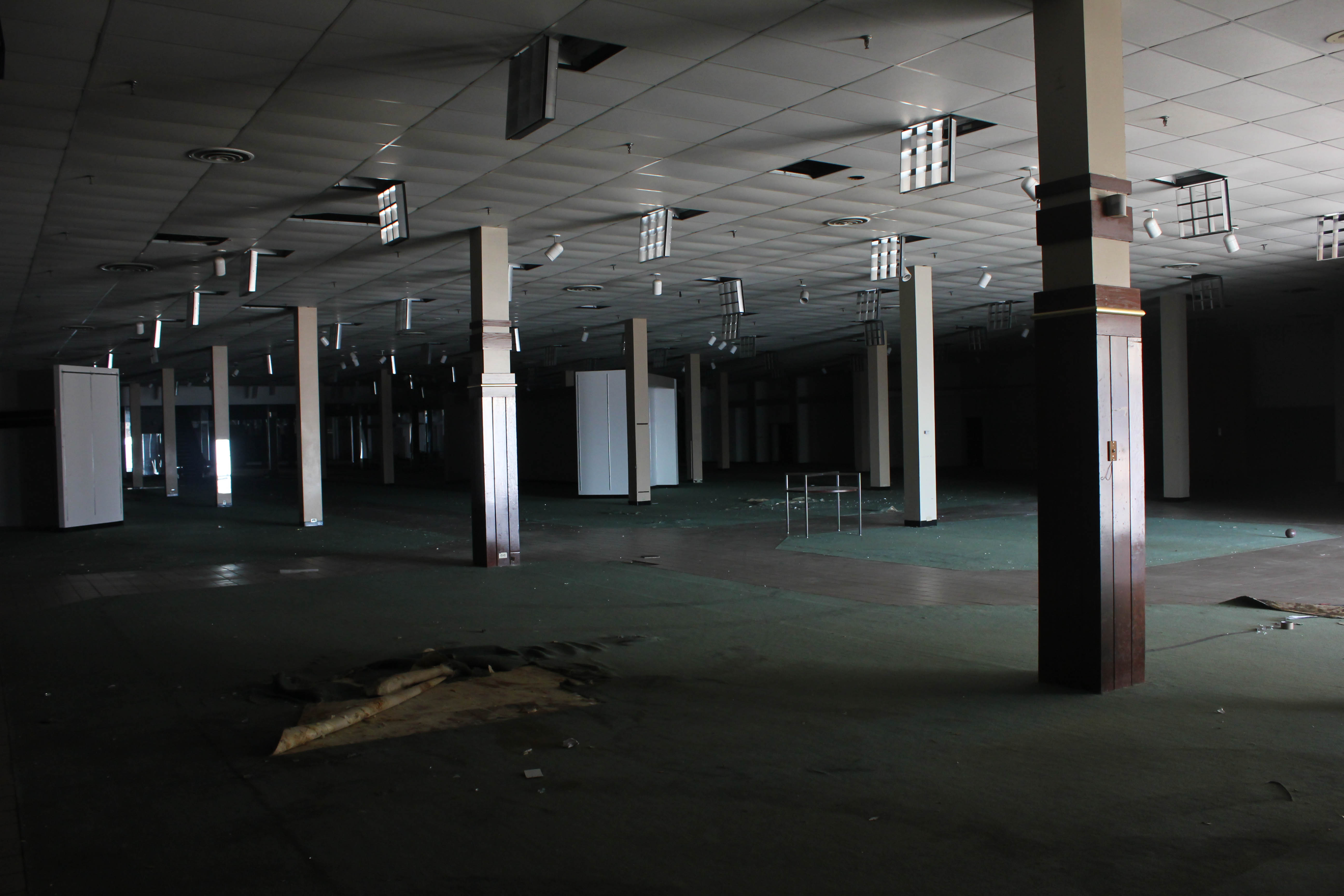
- Abandoned JCPenney (December 2011)
- Location: Chesterfield, Virginia, U.S.
- Address: 7201 Midlothian Turnpike (US 60)
- Opened: August 16, 1972; 54 years ago
- Closed: 2008; 18 years ago
- Demolished: 2011
- Previous names: Cloverleaf Mall
- Developer: Leonard Farber
- Architect: Carneal and Johnston
- Num. of stores: About 70 at peak
- Num. of anchor tenants: 0 (3 at peak)
- Floor area: 760,000 sq ft (71,000 m^{2})
- Floors: 1

Stonebridge Shopping Center, formerly Cloverleaf Mall, was a shopping mall located in Chesterfield County, Virginia on U.S. Route 60 just west of State Route 150. The mall opened in 1972 and featured two anchor stores, JCPenney, and Sears. A third anchor, Thalhimers, opened a year later.

However, the surrounding neighborhoods began to undergo a socioeconomic crisis and developments were occurring away from the mall. This led to a decline, especially in the 1990s and 2000s when businesses left for nearby Chesterfield Towne Center. The mall was eventually closed in 2008 and was ultimately demolished in 2011 to make way for a mixed-use development featuring a Kroger Marketplace.

== History ==
The mall opened in 1972 and featured two anchors: J. C. Penney and Sears. Thalhimers was added a year later as a third anchor. There was also a two-screen movie theater.

Cloverleaf was very successful through the 1970s and 1980s. Major renovations were done to the mall in the 1980s. Thalhimers added a second floor to the anchor and the two-screen theater was moved to a standalone building behind the mall. The space vacated by the original theater was replaced by a food court.

=== Decline ===
Even though the mall thrived through the 1970s and 1980s, it saw a decline in the 1990s, when customers began staying away from the mall as they started to fear some of the youth there. Kids were seen with "baggy pants, and chains hanging off their belts."

In 1996, two clerks from a dollar store inside the mall were found stabbed to death. As of 2026, the murders still remain unsolved.

Not only that, but nearby Chesterfield Towne Center just underwent a major renovation, and development was expanding west, away from Cloverleaf.

These factors caused people to stray away from Cloverleaf Mall, and instead go shopping at Chesterfield Towne Center, which was a safer, newer, and bigger mall just five miles west of Cloverleaf.

In 2000, JCPenney closed their Cloverleaf store and moved to Chesterfield Towne Center, followed in 2003 by Sears and Hecht's, which replaced Thalhimers. The movie theater, owned by Regal Cinemas at the time, was also closed down in 2001.

=== Redevelopment ===
In 2005, a local church wanted to buy the mall to turn it into a multi-purpose facility, with one of the former anchors becoming a sanctuary with about 5,000 seats. However, Chesterfield County didn't approve the church's plans, and purchased the mall instead.

Cloverleaf Mall permanently closed in 2008. The mall, along with all outparcels (except for a Firestone auto care center and a now closed Bank of America branch) were demolished in 2011 to make way for Stonebridge, a mixed-use development featuring the first Virginian Kroger Marketplace along with many other commercial tenants, and apartments.
