= Chesterfield Towne Center =

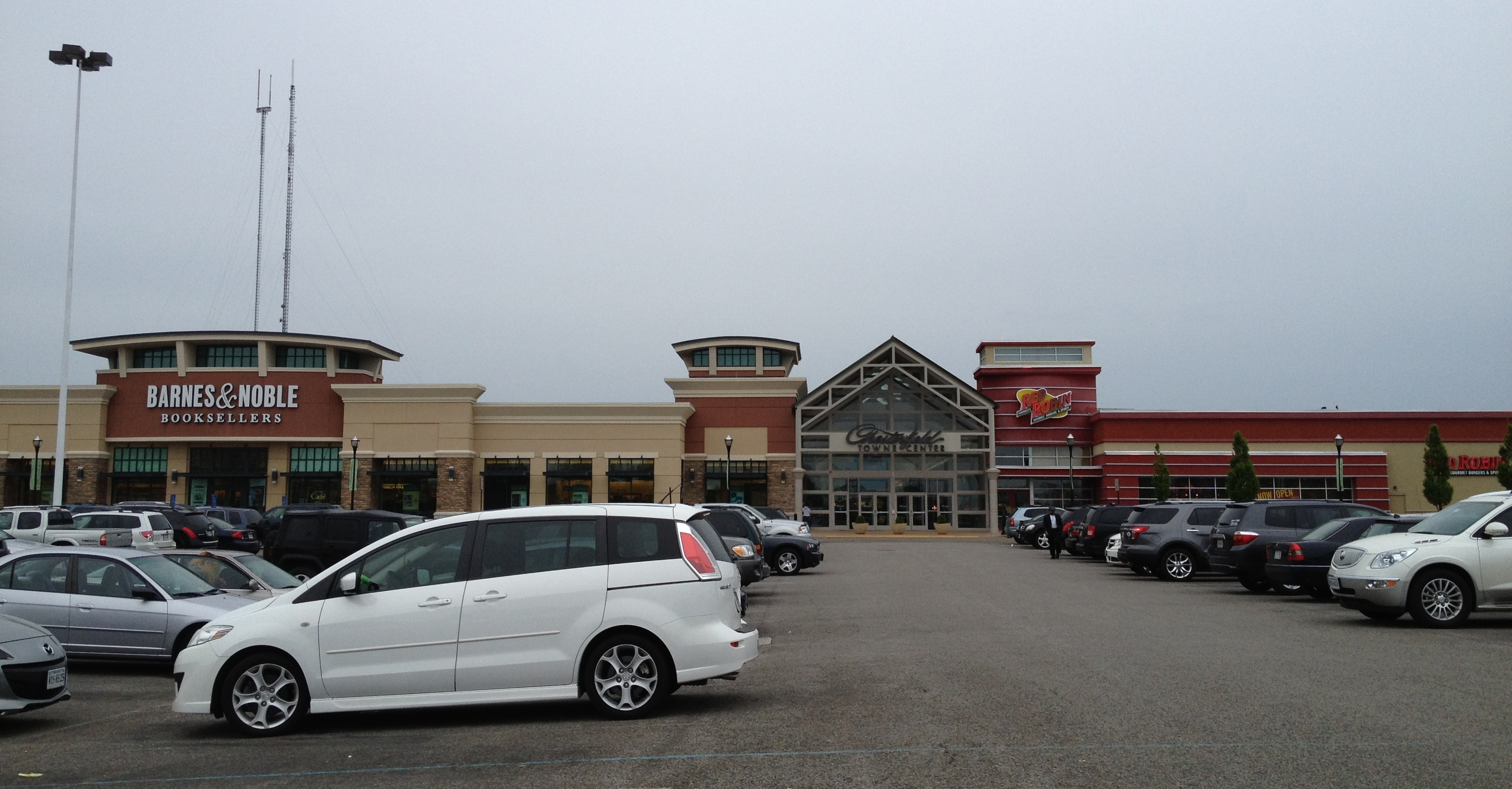
- Exterior view of Chesterfield Towne Center, April 2013
- Location: Chesterfield County, Virginia
- Coordinates: 37.5087°N 77.60873°W
- Address: 11500 Midlothian Turnpike (Note: The mall's mailing city varies by sources. For example, the mall's official website lists the independent city of Richmond although Richmond and Chesterfield County are two different governmental jurisdictions, while some sources lists "North Chesterfield" as the mailing city.)
- Opened: 1975; 51 years ago
- Developer: Chevy Chase Land Company
- Manager: Pacific Retail Capital Partners
- Owner: JRE Partners and Anastacia AG
- Num. of stores: 130
- Num. of anchor tenants: 5 (3 open, 2 vacant)
- Floor area: 1,019,193 sq ft (94,686.1 m^{2})
- Floors: 1 (2 in JCPenney and former Sears)
- Website: www.chesterfieldcenter.com

Chesterfield Towne Center is an enclosed shopping mall located in the Richmond, Virginia metropolitan area in unincorporated Chesterfield County, Virginia. It opened in 1975 and features five anchor stores: At Home, JCPenney, and Macy's, with two vacant anchors last occupied by Sears and a combination TJ Maxx/HomeGoods.

== History ==
Chesterfield Mall, as the center was originally known, opened in 1975. Its sole anchor was Miller & Rhoads. During the mall's initial years, traffic was sluggish, leading some to refer to it as the "Chesterfield Morgue."

In 1987, the mall underwent a major renovation and expansion, adding the Hess's and Leggett-Belk anchors, a food court, a 9 screen movie theater, and the long corridor parallel to Mall Drive. The mall was renamed "Chesterfield Towne Center." It began using a diamond and palm theme, and focused on attracting a more upscale customer. In 1990, Miller & Rhoads rebranded as Hecht's.

In 1993, Hess's sold its store to Proffitt's. Three years later, the store was sold again to Dillard's.

In 1994, The Macerich Partnership acquired Chesterfield Towne Center.

In 1997, Sears opened a store at the mall, followed by JCPenney in 2001, as retailers began to abandon nearby Cloverleaf Mall. Meanwhile, the Leggett-Belk store was traded to Dillard’s, which kept it open as a second location at the mall. Hecht's also completed an addition during this period. Soon, Chesterfield Towne Center was the largest mall in Richmond.

In September 2006, the Hecht's store rebranded as Macy's. May 2008, both of the Dillard's stores closed. A Barnes & Noble bookstore filled the space left vacant by the mall's theater complex in June 2008, relocating from a freestanding store across Huguenot Road. The mall also reworked its food court facade to show off the bookstore and a Red Robin, and renovated the North Entrance.

In November 2010, the former Leggett/Belk/Dillard's was replaced with Garden Ridge, and the former Hess's/Dillard's became a combination TJ Maxx/HomeGoods store in 2011. These openings began a series of store openings and renovations in 2011, including renovations to American Eagle Outfitters and Old Navy, and a new Rue 21 store.

In December 2013, Macerich sold the mall to Rouse Properties. Many predicted the demise of Chesterfield Towne Center when competitors Stony Point Fashion Park and Short Pump Town Center opened in 2003. Ten years later, experts noted that Chesterfield had beaten the odds and held its own against the new competition. 2013 sales were down only 3% from 2003 levels.

In 2015, H&M took over the place of Coldwater Creek, a non-anchor store. Garden Ridge changed its name to At Home.

On November 7, 2019, Sears announced that it would be closing this location as part of a plan to close 96 stores nationwide. This store closed in February 2020.

On June 23, 2020, a fight broke out at the mall between two men, one opening fire, sending the other to the hospital where he later died.

On December 12, 2025 the mall was sold to a joint venture of New York-based investment firm JRE Partners and Anastacia AG, a Swiss company. This came from an announcement from Pacific Retail Capital Partners, a Los Angeles-based firm that’s taking over leasing and management of the mall.

In February 2026, the combined TJ Maxx / HomeGoods anchor closed as the store relocated to a site away from the mall.

In October 2026, the new ownership group announced renovation plans.
