= National Capital Radio and Television Museum =

Museum in Bowie, Maryland, US

National Capital Radio & Television Museum
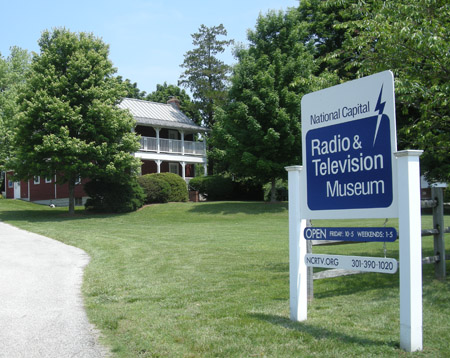
- The museum's location in Bowie, Maryland.

- Location within Maryland National Capital Radio and Television Museum (the United States)
- Established: June 1999
- Location: 2608 Mitchellville Rd Bowie, Maryland
- Coordinates: 38.926667°N 76.733333°W
- President: Christopher Sterling
- Curator: Brian Belanger
- Website: ncrtv.org

The National Capital Radio & Television Museum, located in Bowie, Maryland, was established to educate the public on the development and history of electronic media while exhibiting a collection of radio and television technology from the past.

== About ==
The National Capital Radio & Television Museum contains educational resources and displays to increase public awareness on the impact of electronic media. The museum's collection contains a history of the development of pre-radio technology and progresses into television and other modern radio-based technology. The museum also includes interactive demonstrations of how radio waves work, early recordings of radio and television programs, and exhibits appealing to children. Visitor hours are Fridays 9 AM to 4 PM, Saturdays and Sundays 12 PM to 4 PM. Groups and school tours are arranged by prior appointment. Admission is now charged.

== Galleries ==
The National Capital Radio & Television Museum is organized into seven related exhibit galleries:

- Gallery 1: Wireless Beginnings: Focus on invention of "wireless telegraphy" (or simply wireless) to describe sending Morse Code.
- Gallery 2: Birth of Broadcasting: From the first limited scheduled radio broadcasts (often listened to with home built crystal radios) through to a few years later when radio had become a country-wide phenomenon.
- Gallery 3: Radio Comes of Age: Radio becomes a fixture in many American households and the Federal Communications Commission is formed to regulate radio stations.
- Gallery 4: Radio’s Golden Age: With improving technology, radios became less expensive and smaller. Radio also became a main source of family entertainment.
- Gallery 5: Post-War Radio: With radio still going strong, television introduced a new visual medium.
- Gallery 6: Rise of Television: Twenty years of TV design innovation, including different signal reception/ display ideas
- Gallery 7: How it all Works: Sound effects used for early radio brought to life

== History of the Museum ==
In 1984, a number of antique radio collectors in the Washington/Baltimore area formed a hobby group called the Mid-Atlantic Antique Radio Club (MAARC). MAARC has thrived and today is an active club of some 800 members and publishes a monthly journal.

Soon after MAARC’s founding, club members began exploring the possibility of creating a museum to share their interest in vintage radio with the general public. Several possibilities were investigated but it became clear that to be successful, a separate organization dedicated to the task of creating and operating a museum has to be established. The resulting Radio & Television Museum (R&T Museum) operated by the Radio History Society, Inc. (now the National Capital Radio & Television Museum [NCRTV Museum]) is a Maryland non-profit corporation established in 1993 for the express purpose of creating a museum of radio and television. R&T Museum sought and received IRS 501(c)(3) nonprofit status.

Starting with no building, no funds, no collection, and only a handful of dedicated volunteers, the Museum began by borrowing artifacts from local radio collectors and mounting temporary exhibits in several of the region’s public libraries, downtown at the George Washington University, and at the City Place Mall in Silver Spring, Maryland. Efforts sought an affordable building in which to create a permanent museum.

In 1998, the Society learned of a century-old former farmhouse in Bowie, Maryland, that was owned and had been refurbished by the City of Bowie. The fully restored building is located at the intersection of Mitchellville and Mount Oak Roads, located just off of Route 50 and the D.C. Beltway, east of Washington, D.C. After a visit, the Museum leadership determined it might be suitable for creation of a museum. The Society’s officers made a presentation to the Bowie City Council, after which the city manager agreed to a long-term lease agreement with the Society. In March 1999 a long-term lease agreement for the Radio & Television Museum was signed by then-president Ed Walker and the City of Bowie. The Museum opened its doors to the public in June 1999, and celebrated its 10th anniversary in 2009.

In recent years, it became increasingly evident that the two entities Radio History Society and the Radio & Television Museum were confusing. Consequently, in 2011 the board determined to change the organization name to National Capital Radio & Television Museum, doing away with the Society and the old Radio & Television Museum. The name change was publicly announced on May 9, 2012. In addition, the board brought on its first paid professional staff in mid-2011.

This mutually beneficial public-private partnership continues today. The building and grounds continue to be maintained by the city, while NCRTV operates the museum.

In other partnering, the Museum also has developed exhibits at the George Washington University (since 2001), and at the Library of American Broadcasting at the University of Maryland. Recently it is partnering with the Prince George's County Memorial Library System to present regularly scheduled programs.
