= Sosnik-Morris-Early Commercial Block =

Historic buildings in North Carolina, US

- U.S. National Register of Historic Places
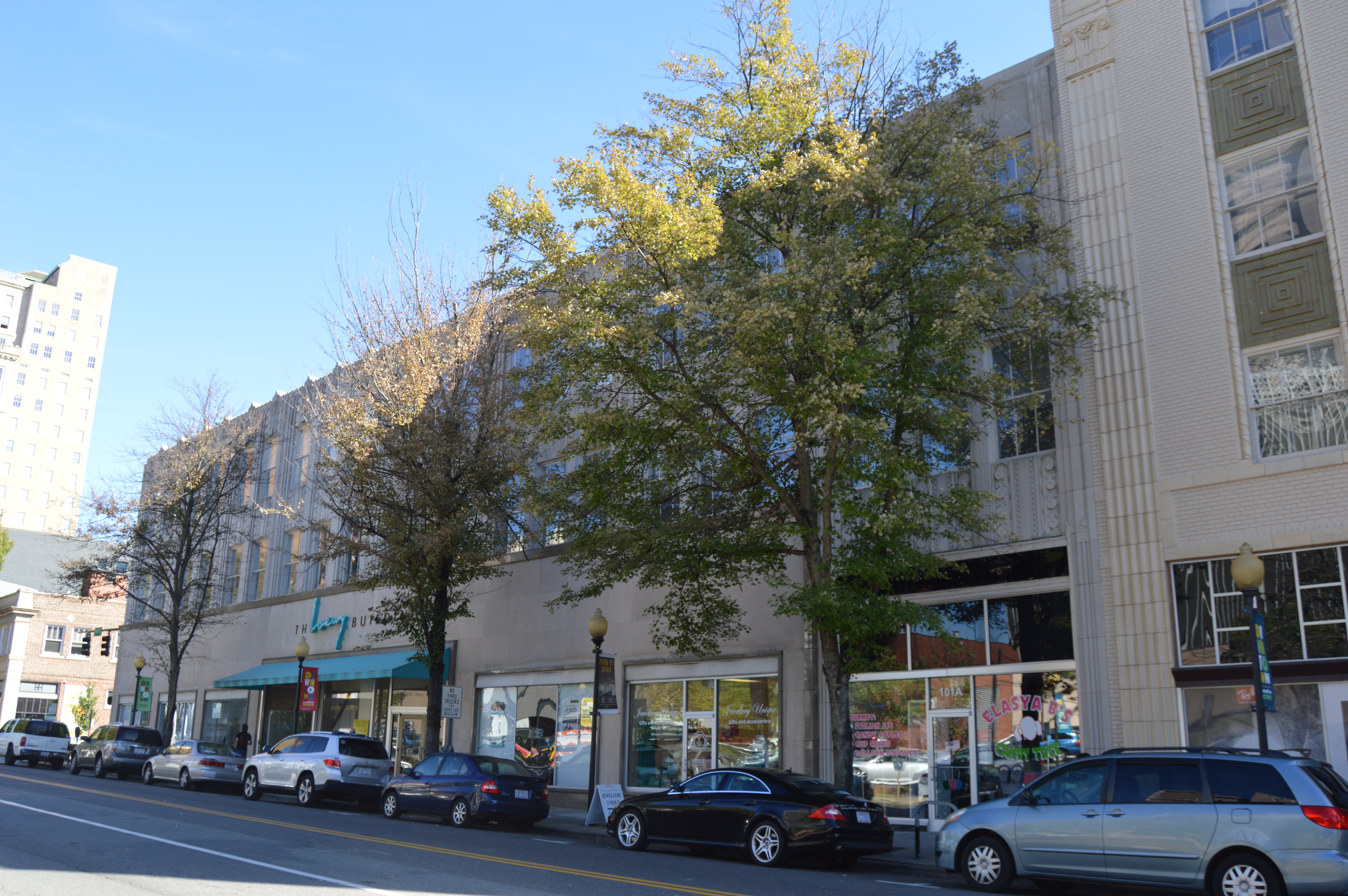
- Facade

- Location within North Carolina Location within the United States
- Location: 500 W. 4th St., Winston-Salem, North Carolina
- Coordinates: 36°5′31″N 80°15′14″W
- Area: less than one acre
- Built: 1929
- Architect: Northup and O'Brien
- Architectural style: Art Deco
- NRHP reference No.: 84002293
- Added to NRHP: April 5, 1984

Sosnik-Morris-Early Commercial Block, also known as Thalhimer's, are two historic commercial buildings located at Winston-Salem, Forsyth County, North Carolina. They were built in 1929, and known as the Morris-Early furniture store building and the Sosnik's clothing store. Both buildings include elements from the popular Art Deco style. The Morris-Early building is a four-story, brick building with terra cotta ornament and cable molding. The Sosnik's building is a three-story, nine bay by ten bay, limestone faced building. The Sosnik's building was extensively renovated in 1949 by Raymond Loewy Associates, when Sosnik's and Thalhimers merged. In 1958, Thalhimer's acquired the Morris-Early store for further expansion.

It was listed on the National Register of Historic Places in 1984.
