= Golden Skillet =

Fast-food chain

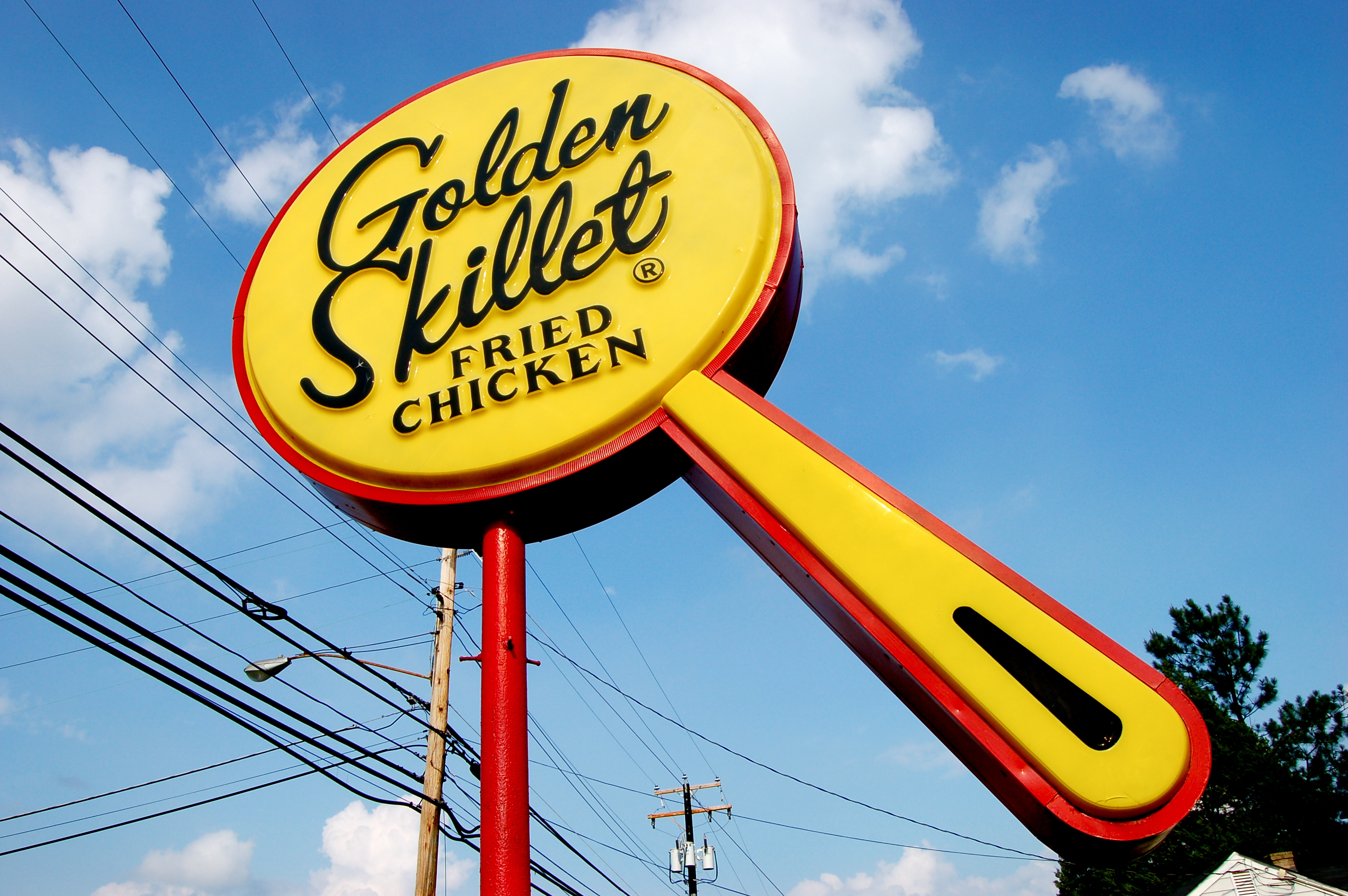
Golden Skillet sign in Sandston, Virginia

Golden Skillet is a fast-food chain that mainly sells fried chicken originating in Richmond, Virginia. The first Golden Skillet chicken was sold in 1963 at the downtown Richmond department store Thalhimer's. The fried chicken recipe was created by Clifton W. Guthrie, the original owner and founder of Golden Skillet.

The slogan for the chain was "Tender as Quail! Tasty as Pheasant!" While the recipe was not officially published, it is known that the fried chicken was cooked in special pressure-cookers and with specific breading.

== History ==
In 1963, a vice president of a Thalhimers grocery store tasted Guthrie's chicken at a banquet; shortly after, it was sold at the Thalhimers' restaurant.

Eventually, in Richmond, the first freestanding location opened in 1968. By October 2, 1981, Guthrie's death, the chain had grown to 16 company-owned locations and 180 franchises worldwide. It had affiliate firms with Puerto Rico, Canada, and Japan. As of April 2024, the company operates 10 locations in Maryland, North Carolina, and Virginia.

Golden Skillet would be sold to American chain Dairy Queen sometime in the 1980s after Guthrie's death.

== Locations ==
Some locations of the franchise include Sandston, Virginia, Plymouth, North Carolina, Henderson, North Carolina, Ahoskie, North Carolina, Danville, Virginia, Petersburg, Virginia, and Richmond, Virginia.There was a Golden Skillet in Welch, West Virginia for a short time in the 1970s.

== See also ==
- List of fast-food chicken restaurants
