= Miller & Rhoads =

Department store chain in Virginia, U.S.

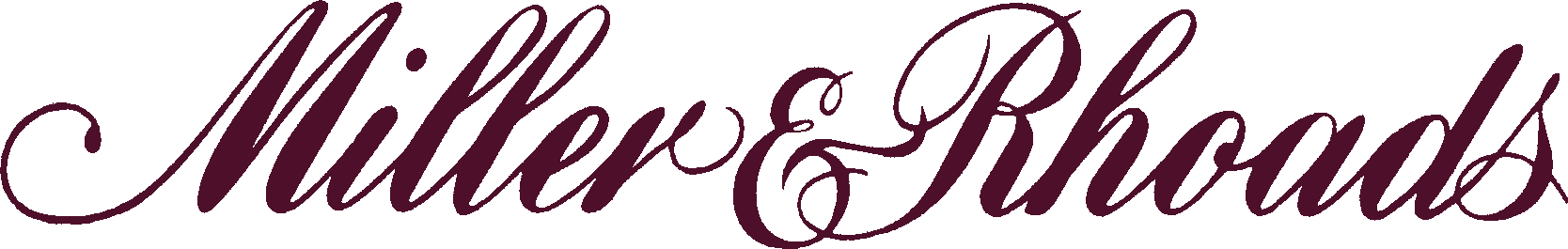
- Type: Department store
- Industry: Retail
- Founded: 1885
- Defunct: 1990
- Fate: Converted or Sold to Hecht's
- Successor: Hecht's
- Headquarters: Richmond, Virginia
- Key people: Linton Miller, Co-Founder; Webster Rhoads, Co-Founder; Simon Gerhart, Co-Founder
- Products: Clothing, footwear, furniture, jewelry, beauty products, electronics and housewares.

Miller & Rhoads was a Virginia-based department store chain. Throughout its 105-year lifespan, the store played an active role in the community of Richmond, Virginia, along with its friendly cross-street rival Thalhimers. The Richmond flagship location was known for its "SantaLand" upstairs attraction, which has since become an attraction at the Children’s Museum of Richmond. Following a series of ownership changes starting in 1967, Campeau Corporation purchased Miller & Rhoads in 1987 and later sold it to Philadelphia developer Kevin Donohoe before closing in 1990.

== Origins ==
In 1885, Linton Miller, Webster Rhoads, and Simon Gerhart opened a dry goods store in Richmond, Virginia. The store—Miller, Rhoads, & Gerhart—opened with an initial investment of $3,000. In 1888, Miller, Rhoads, & Gerhart moved to 509 East Broad Street.

Simon Gerhart relocated to Lynchburg, Virginia, in 1890 and opened his own store there. It was at this time that the nameplate of the Richmond store changed to Miller & Rhoads. By 1909, the Richmond Broad Street store covered nearly half a city block, and by 1924, it covered an entire block, stretching from Broad to Grace Street, ultimately expanding to nearly half a million square feet of floor space.

During the middle part of the 20th century, the growth of Miller & Rhoads in Richmond was at its peak. The store was home to the ever-popular Tea Room, which featured regular fashion shows, and signature menu items such as the Missouri Club, Brunswick stew, and chocolate silk pie.

As time progressed, Miller & Rhoads began to boast modern conveniences like a 1,000 car parking garage (shared with Thalhimers), air conditioning and escalators. The store also hosted famous writers, art exhibits and other community events intended to add a cosmopolitan flair to the city.

== Santaland and the "real" Santa Claus ==
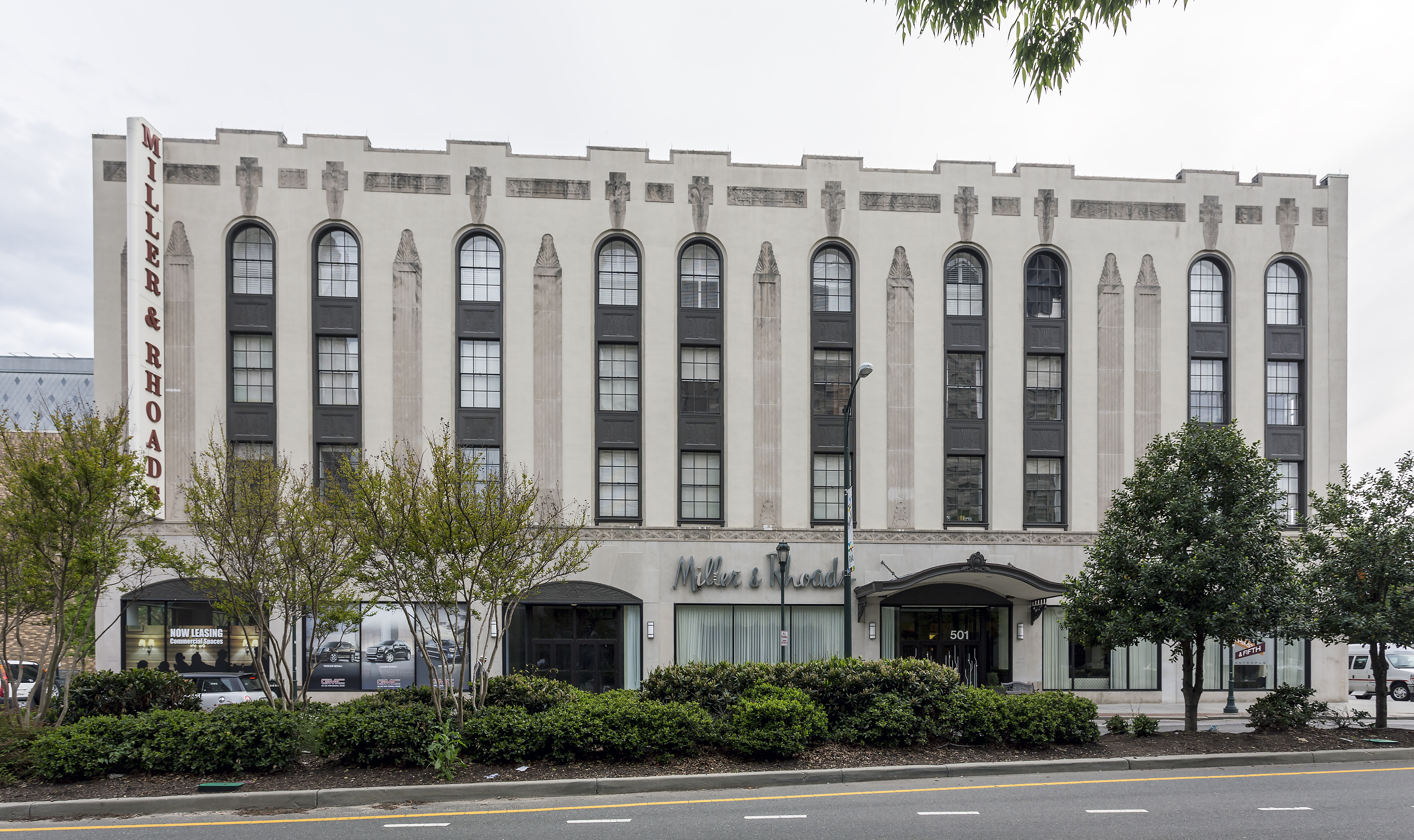
The former Miller & Rhoads at 501 E. Broad St., now a hotel and condominium complex

Every Christmas season, a room on the seventh floor of Miller & Rhoads transformed into a temporary 'Santaland'.The room was dimly lit, but thousands of tiny, white lights gave the appearance of night stars overhead. Woodland scenes with animated animals were strategically placed throughout the room. Fully decorated trees adorned a path leading to a stage. Onstage were a huge fireplace, a Christmas tree, and a golden chair with a red velvet back and seat where Santa Claus sat.

Santaland became so much a part of the Richmond store's folklore that the company began airing commercials with the tagline Miller & Rhoads – Where Christmas is a Legend.

Even now, years after Miller & Rhoads closed, Santa Claus still holds court in downtown Richmond, first shifting to Thalhimers in 1990, then to the Sixth Street Marketplace after Thalhimers closed, and currently sees children at the Children's Museum of Richmond. The Santa Tea's event is held each holiday season.

== Postwar expansion ==
Between 1956 and 1960, Miller & Rhoads began to expand, opening stores in downtown Lynchburg, Charlottesville and Roanoke. The stores were full-line, multi-level operations that were traditional in design and included many features popular at the Richmond store, like the Tea Room.

By the late 1960s, the chain also added new suburban stores at Southside Plaza and The Shops at Willow Lawn in Richmond, Walnut Plaza in Petersburg, Newmarket Shopping Center in Hampton, Southern Shopping Center in Norfolk, Pembroke Mall in Virginia Beach, Barracks Road Shopping Center in Charlottesville, Pittman Plaza in Lynchburg and Roanoke-Salem Plaza in Roanoke. Generally, the first wave of Miller & Rhoads' suburban expansion was smaller specialty stores that focused on family apparel, primarily ladies' ready-to-wear.

In 1967, Miller & Rhoads merged with Washington, DC–based department store Julius Garfinkel & Co and New York–based specialty chain Brooks Brothers to form Garfinckel, Brooks Brothers, Miller & Rhoads, Inc.

== The suburban age ==
After successfully opening smaller suburban locations, Miller & Rhoads set its sights on large stores in regional malls. However, its first attempt at a larger store in the suburban Richmond market was thwarted because of a clause in a lease on an existing location. Because of a section in their lease at Southside Plaza that prevented additional locations within five miles of that shopping center, Miller & Rhoads was unable to be an anchor at Cloverleaf Mall, Richmond’s first large regional mall, which was only four miles away.

In the mid-1970s, Miller & Rhoads opened three large stores in new shopping malls at Regency Square, the Chesterfield Towne Center in suburban Richmond and Newmarket North Mall in Hampton, with the latter relocating from a shopping center across the street. It also opened a number of specialty stores in Roanoke and Portsmouth, Virginia and Greensboro, Charlotte, Raleigh, Durham and Fayetteville, North Carolina.

Miller & Rhoads continued to expand to other cities in Virginia and North Carolina into the early 1980s, relocating its downtown Lynchburg and Charlottesville stores into shopping malls (River Ridge Mall and Charlottesville Fashion Square, respectively) and opening large new locations at Lynnhaven Mall in Virginia Beach and Greenbrier Mall in Chesapeake.

Even as its stores grew more contemporary, the chain adhered to many old traditions. Miller & Rhoads stores almost always had engraved metal name plaques at their entrances, even on mall entrances. An early 1980s redesign of the store logo featured curvaceous script reminiscent of calligraphy.

== Decline and closing ==
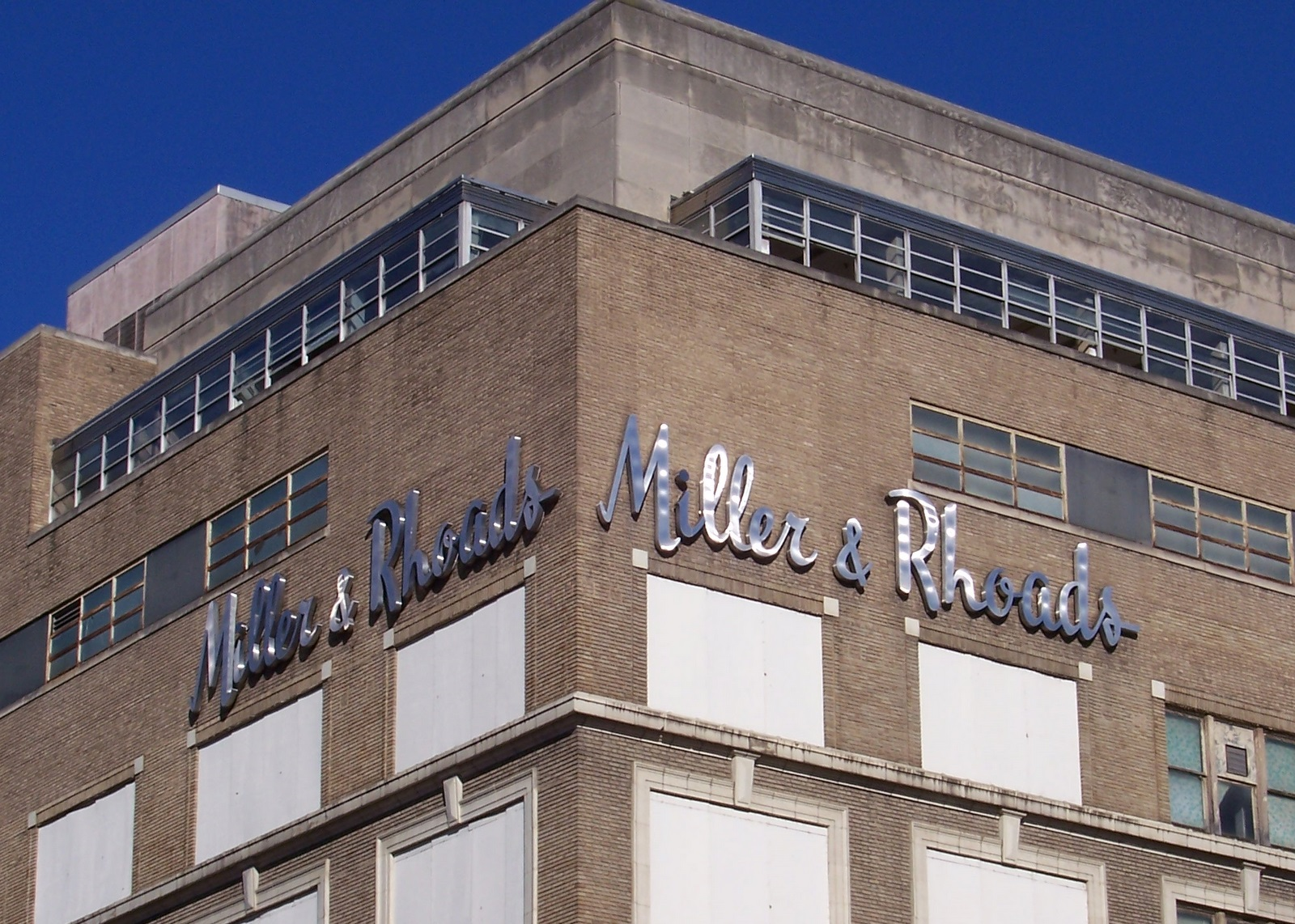
The shuttered downtown Richmond location in 2004 before housing a Hilton hotel.

The Garfinkel, Brooks Brothers, Miller & Rhoads company was acquired by Allied Stores in 1982. This marked a low point in the chain's history, as Allied closed many of the smaller stores, exiting the North Carolina market except for Raleigh, and began to neglect the maintenance on its larger stores in an effort to cut operating costs. Allied opened a small number of new, larger locations in Virginia. The downtown Roanoke store was closed in this period and replaced by a store at Valley View Mall.

In an effort to revitalize the decaying downtown Richmond retail core, the city government, Miller & Rhoads, and Thalhimers teamed together in 1985 in the development of the 6th Street Marketplace, an urban "festival marketplace" shopping center that took the place of the street that separated the two stores. Though it started out relatively popular, the downtown mall did not remain a success, and was razed by 2004. Miller & Rhoads' suburban stores continued to grow, but the downtown store's sales were generally stagnant with the exception of the Christmas season.

In 1987, following its own ill-fated buyout by Campeau Corp., Allied sold Miller & Rhoads to Philadelphia developer Kevin Donohoe and store management, who began to renovate stores and plan a major expansion. At the time, Miller & Rhoads numbered 21 stores. New Miller & Rhoads stores were proposed for Savannah Mall in Savannah, Georgia and Carolina Place in Pineville, North Carolina, as well as Dutch Square in Columbia, South Carolina.

Only two years later, in 1989, the company's future was dimming. Faced with increasing competition from stores like Leggett and Hess's and dwindling finances, Miller & Rhoads filed for Chapter 11 bankruptcy protection and by 1990, all Miller & Rhoads stores closed their doors for good.

The May Department Stores Company purchased four of Miller & Rhoads' larger suburban units in Richmond and Hampton Roads for about $22.7 million (~$49.4 million in 2025) and reopened them as Hecht's in late 1990. May also took over Thalhimers that same year and eventually combined that chain with Hecht's as well.

At both Regency Square and Lynnhaven Mall, Hecht's would operate two stores, one each in the former Miller & Rhoads and Thalhimers spaces. Hecht's eventually consolidated its Lynnhaven Mall stores into a single location, but at Regency Square, both stores were occupied by the chain until September 2006 when the Hecht's name was replaced with Macy's.

Many of the remaining former Miller & Rhoads stores were converted to department stores like Montgomery Ward, Stone & Thomas and Value City or subdivided for other retail uses, while some were turned into offices and others demolished.

In 2006, work began to convert the long shuttered Miller & Rhoads flagship store in downtown Richmond into a hotel and residential spaces. The old department store is now home to a 250-room full-line Hilton Hotel which is now the Richmond Hilton Downtown and 130 apartments or condominiums. The $100 million project is being overseen by Richmond's Broad Street Community Development Authority.

== See also ==
- List of department stores converted to Macy's
