= Lynnhaven Mall =

Coordinates: 36°48′59″N 76°4′16″W

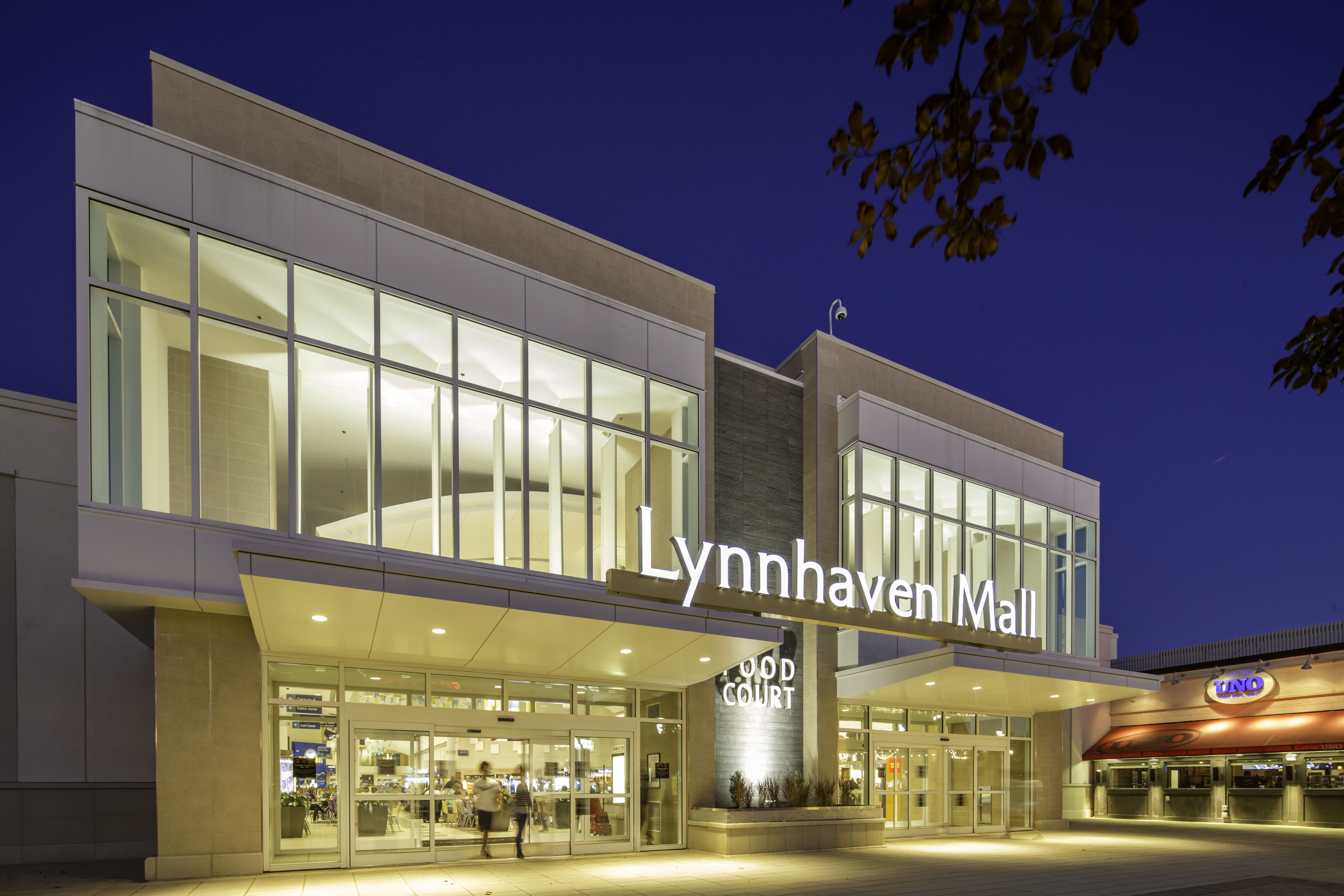
- Lynnhaven Mall entrance
- Location: Virginia Beach, Virginia, U.S.
- Address: 701 Lynnhaven Parkway
- Opened: August 1981
- Developer: Melvin Simon & Associates
- Manager: GGP
- Owner: GGP
- Num. of stores: 180
- Num. of anchor tenants: 11
- Floor area: 1,170,000 square feet (109,000 m^{2}) (GLA)
- Floors: 1 (formerly 2; 2 in JCPenney, Dillard's, and Macy's)
- Website: lynnhavenmall.com

Lynnhaven Mall is an enclosed super-regional shopping mall located in Virginia Beach, Virginia, U.S.. It opened in August 1981 and has a gross leasable area of 1,170,000 square feet (109,000 m^{2}), making it the largest mall in the Hampton Roads metropolitan area and one of the largest malls on the East Coast.

The mall features over 180 stores, with Dillard's, JCPenney, and Macy's serving as the main anchor stores. Other notable tenants and junior anchors include the Apple Store, Barnes & Noble, Dick's Sporting Goods, L.L. Bean, XXI Forever, H&M, and Old Navy. Dave & Buster's is also a recent addition to the mall and the region. An 18-screen AMC Theatres complex anchors an adjacent open-air pedestrian plaza.

The mall is owned and managed by GGP, a subsidiary of Brookfield Properties, headquartered in Chicago, Illinois.

== History ==
Lynnhaven Mall opened in 1981. The mall was developed by Melvin Simon & Associates (now Simon Property Group) of Indianapolis, Indiana, and is located on Lynnhaven Parkway south of Interstate 264 (then State Route 44). The mall originally featured six anchor stores: national chains JCPenney and Montgomery Ward, as well as regional chains Rices Nachmans, Thalhimers, Miller & Rhoads, and Leggett. Over time, all of the original anchors except JCPenney were replaced. The first change occurred in 1984, when Rices Nachmans became Hess's.

Miller & Rhoads closed in 1990 as part of the chain’s bankruptcy and was converted to Hecht's later that year.

Hess's closed at Lynnhaven Mall on March 30, 1991, as part of a corporate decision to eliminate smaller and underperforming stores. Its location was subsequently sold to Limited Brands, which divided the space among several of its retail chains, including a The Limited superstore that opened in early 1992.

Thalhimers closed in 1992 following the chain’s dissolution, and was replaced by a second Hecht's location. Both Hecht's stores remained until 1998, when the company opened a new consolidated location between Dillard's and Montgomery Ward.

Leggett was sold to Belk in 1997; one year later, the store was transferred to Dillard's as part of a mutual exchange between the two companies. Dillard's also acquired the former Thalhimers/Hecht's space, placing its women’s departments in one building and men’s departments in the other. In 1999, Lord & Taylor opened a new store at the mall, replacing the original Miller & Rhoads/Hecht’s location.

=== 2000s ===
Montgomery Ward closed in 2001 following the chain’s bankruptcy. In 2003, Simon Property Group sold Lynnhaven Mall to General Growth Properties (now Brookfield Properties) of Chicago, Illinois for $256.6 million. Around this time, DSW Shoe Warehouse also opened at the mall. Lord & Taylor closed its store in 2005 after repositioning efforts proved unsuccessful.

The former Montgomery Ward space was subdivided between 2003 and 2005 to accommodate Dick's Sporting Goods, Barnes & Noble, and Steve & Barry's. Dillard's expanded into the former Thalhimers/Hecht’s building in 2005, vacating the former Leggett/Belk space. That building was subsequently demolished and redeveloped into an outdoor plaza known as The Inlet, anchored by an AMC Theatres complex.

In 2006, Hecht's, a division of May Department Stores, was rebranded as Macy's following Federated Department Stores’ (now Macy's, Inc.) acquisition of the May Company. H&M also opened in part of the former Hess’s space after The Limited relocated within the mall. Steve & Barry's closed on January 30, 2009, due to the company’s liquidation, and the space became Furniture Mart in 2010. DSW Shoe Warehouse later vacated its space, which was replaced by a Forever 21 store.

In 2012, Furniture Mart closed and relocated elsewhere in Virginia Beach. Dave & Buster's, a newcomer to the region, opened in its place on July 20, 2013.

At the end of 2013, the mall’s carousel, which had greeted shoppers at the main entrance for 17 years, was removed to make way for a planned renovation. Announced in January 2014, the renovation added 29,000 square feet (2,700 m^{2}) to the mall, including a new ground-level food court and an open atrium. The food court opened on October 27, 2014, the same day the remaining mezzanine was closed for demolition.

The Apple opened a new retail location near Sephora in September 2014, marking the second Apple Store in the Hampton Roads area (the first being at MacArthur Center, which closed in 2021). During this period, the long-vacant Miller & Rhoads/Hecht’s/Lord & Taylor anchor space was mostly demolished and reconstructed. The area was divided into two new retail spaces and a public entrance, which opened in October 2015. L.L. Bean occupied the south half, opening on June 10, 2016, while the north half became home to a Maggie McFly's restaurant—the first location outside Connecticut—which opened in May 2017.

As part of the renovation, most of the connector bridges were removed. Because the upper parking deck was no longer effectively used, it was partially demolished between March and June 2016, leaving only the section in front of JCPenney and its bridge. The cleared area was converted to open-air parking.

In 2020, during the COVID-19 pandemic, Lynnhaven Mall adjusted its operating hours to 12 p.m.–7 p.m. On March 30, 2020, following a stay-at-home order issued by Virginia Governor Ralph Northam, the mall temporarily closed all non-essential services. Essential businesses that remained open included Dillard's, Barnes & Noble, Pet Go Round, Everclear Eyes Optometry, and Bank of America. Some services operated with a limit of 10 patrons at a time, while Everclear Eyes Optometry accepted emergency appointments only. As restrictions eased, additional retailers reopened. By May 2021, with the lifting of statewide mandates, the mall resumed mostly normal operations, maintaining limited safety protocols such as enhanced cleaning and social distancing recommendations.
