= Wards Corner =

Shopping district in Norfolk, Virginia

Coordinates: 36.91594°N 76.27103°W

Wards Corner is a historical suburban shopping center and residential neighborhood in Norfolk, Virginia, located approximately five miles north of downtown and less than four miles southeast of Naval Station Norfolk. The shopping center originated from a general store that was opened by grocer Alfred C. Ward on Norfolk County farmland in 1910.

Known as the "Times Square of the South," the shopping hub served as one of the first and most popular suburban shopping centers of the region from the mid-to-late twentieth century. The area became a crossroads that served customers from the surrounding local military bases, Naval Station Norfolk and Naval Amphibious Base Little Creek, as well as other neighborhoods, including Ocean View, Sewell's Point, Talbot Park, and Little Creek. Notable stores of the area at the time included Hofheimer's, Revco Pharmacy, Rices Nachmans, and Mercury Roller Rink.

Current retailers in Wards Corner include Firehouse Subs, Chipotle Mexican Grill, Starbucks, a Harris Teeter grocery store and fuel service station, Moe's Southwest Grill, Subway, the Book Exchange, Your Pie, and Black Rifle Coffee Company. A new Target is currently in development at Wards Corner and will be located along the corridor for the Hampton Roads Beltway near I-64.
