= Hofheimer's =

American shoe store chain

Hofheimer's was a Norfolk, Virginia-based chain of shoe stores that was once a leading East Coast retailer. Victor Strasburger founded the company with the three Hofheimer brothers in 1885. it specialized in upscale men's and women's footwear, including Florsheim shoes for men.

One of the larger freestanding suburban stores was at Wards Corner in Norfolk (the "Times Square of the South"), which opened as the chain's fourth store in 1952. The Wards Corner location was in the same building as a Rices Nachman's department store. It had a children's play area and two live monkeys in a glass enclosed cage. This building was demolished in 2000, and as of 2018, is the location of a Walgreens pharmacy.

Other major stores were at Norfolk's Military Circle Mall and on Granby St. in Downtown Norfolk.

Lewis D. Hirschler, grandson of company founder Victor Strasburger, served as president from 1974 - 1985. In 1982, he sold the company to Ward White Investments, Ltd. of Northamptonshire, England. The retailer began to decline in the 1990s, and the Ward's Corner store closed in 1993. The company is now defunct, having filed for Chapter 11 bankruptcy in 1997 and closing for good in 1998. At the time, it had 150 employees and 20 stores, including one at Peninsula Town Center and another at Patrick Henry Mall.
