= Charlottesville Fashion Square =

Shopping mall in Charlottesville, Virginia, United States

- Location: Charlottesville, Virginia, United States
- Coordinates: 38°4′36.9″N 78°28′30.3″W
- Address: 1600 Rio Road E.
- Opened: March 5, 1980; 46 years ago
- Closed: January 31, 2025; 21 months ago
- Developer: Leonard L. Farber Company
- Manager: JLL
- Num. of stores: 40+ stores
- Num. of anchor tenants: 4
- Floor area: 572,000 square feet (53,100 m^{2}) (GLA)
- Floors: 1
- Website: charlottesvillefashion.com

Charlottesville Fashion Square is a defunct regional shopping mall in Charlottesville, Virginia, United States, located about one mile (1.6 km) north of Charlottesville city limits on U.S. Route 29 in unincorporated Albemarle County. Fashion Square opened in 1980 and was renovated in 1990 and 1999. In 2021, its owners filed for bankruptcy, and in January 2025, the mall's management terminated the leases of all interior stores and closed off the interior. As of 2026, the remaining anchor stores are Belk and Home Depot, with the Albemarle County Public Safety Operations Center located in a third former anchor store.

== History ==
Construction of the mall by the Leonard L. Farber Company began in early 1979, with an opening date set for March 1980. By February 1980, Miller & Rhoads, J. C. Penney, Sears, and Leggett had been announced as anchors, with seventy-five other interior tenants already confirmed. The mall opened on March 5, 1980, drawing a crowd of four thousand. At opening, the mall had only two anchors, with Leggett not set to open until March 26, and J. C. Penney not expected to open until March 1981.

In January 1990, Miller & Rhoads closed its location at the mall, with merchandise being shipped to other stores recently purchased by The May Department Stores Company. The mall was renovated in 1990, coinciding with the opening of several new tenants such as Gap Kids, Victoria's Secret, and Express. In 1996, the mall was purchased by Shopping Center Associates from previous owners CFS Associates Limited.

The mall was renovated again, beginning in 1999 and finishing in 2002. The $8.5 million renovation improved lighting and seating within the mall, added decor intended to give the mall a more modern feel, and removed umbrella motifs dating to the mall's opening.

=== Decline and new anchor tenants ===
On December 28, 2018, Sears announced plans to close its Fashion Square anchor. The store closed in March 2019.

In February 2020, analysts reported that the mall was facing "imminent default" on $45.2 million of loans. This followed an increasing number of store closures in the mall, as well as the mall being downgraded to a "non-core" property by owners Washington Prime Group. On August 20, 2020, J. C. Penney announced plans to close its anchor that November, leaving the two Belk stores as the only anchors.

On June 13, 2021, Washington Prime filed for Chapter 11 bankruptcy, citing the COVID-19 pandemic as the main reason. The mall was auctioned to a local lending company that July for $20.2 million.

In August 2024, Home Depot acquired and began redeveloping the Sears site.

On September 16, 2024, Belk announced the September 20 opening of a Belk Outlet in the former Belk Men's and Home anchor store. Three months later on December 16, they announced that the outlet would close in January 2025. Plans were announced for the Belk outlet to be replaced by Hobby Lobby, but this has not happened as of 2026.

In 2024, Albemarle County purchased the former JCPenney anchor building converted the space into public safety offices for the Albemarle County Police Department (ACPD) and Albemarle County Fire Rescue (ACFR).

In January 2025, Fashion Square's management terminated the leases of the few remaining interior store owners and ordered them to leave by January 31, 2025. The mall interior was completely closed on that date.

The Home Depot opened a newly-constructed store on the site of the old Sears anchor store on August 28, 2025. Belk continues to operate its anchor store.

The Belk anchor store remains open, as of 2026.

== See also ==
- The Teeth of the Tiger, which caused a minor controversy over its depiction of the mall as the site of a terrorist attack.
