= MacArthur Center =

Defunct mall in Norfolk, Virginia, U.S.

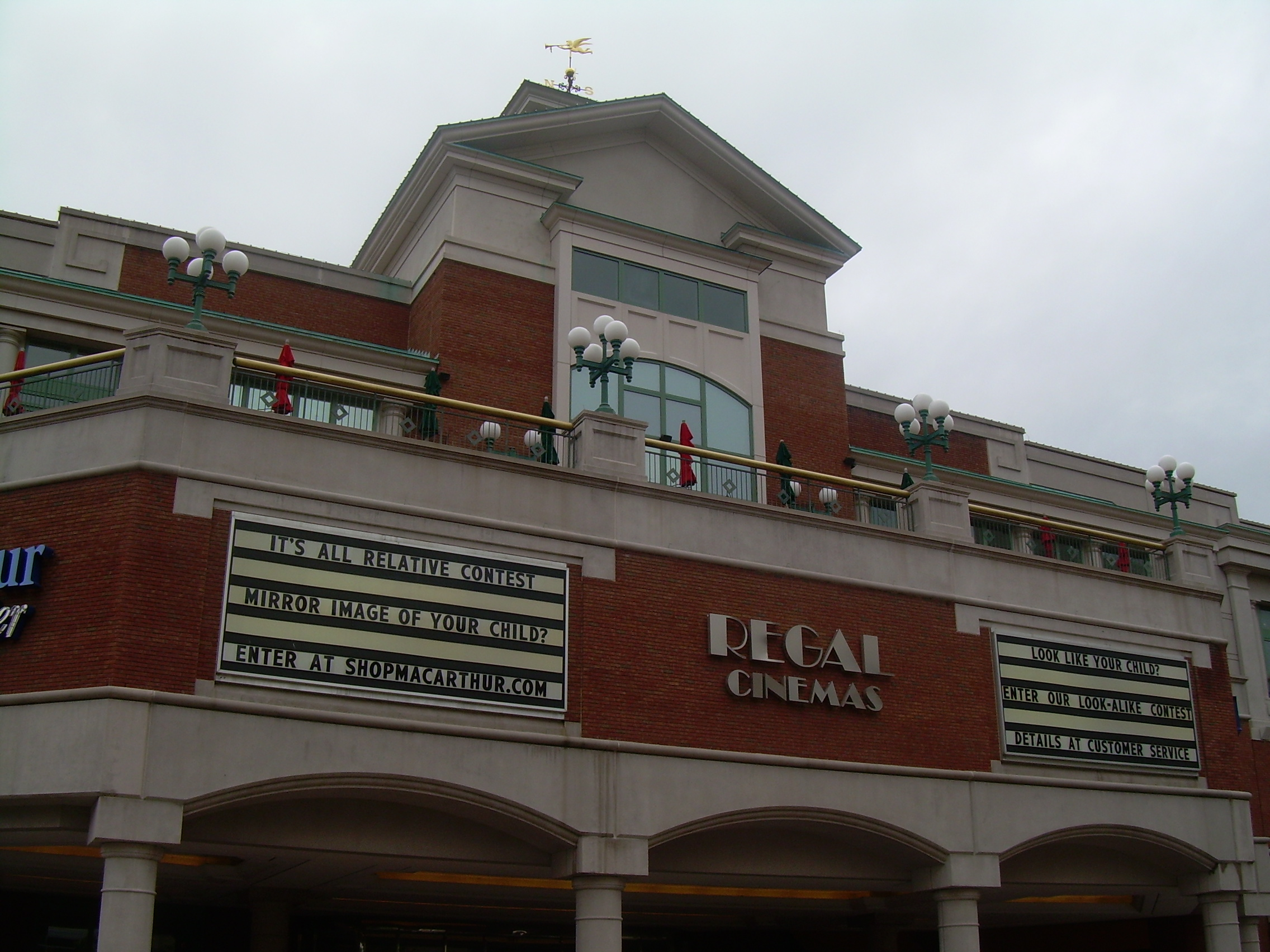
- Exterior view of MacArthur Center's food court balcony
- Location: Norfolk, Virginia, U.S.
- Coordinates: 36.848918°N 76.288038°W
- Opened: March 12, 1999; 27 years ago
- Closed: June 27, 2026; 4 months ago
- Developer: Taubman Centers
- Manager: S.L. Nusbaum Realty Co.
- Owner: City of Norfolk
- Num. of stores: 23 (140 at peak)
- Num. of anchor tenants: 2 (both vacant)
- Floor area: 900,000 ft^{2} (84,000 m^{2}), including 400,000 ft^{2} (37,000 m^{2}) retail and 100,000 ft^{2} (9,300 m^{2}) food & entertainment
- Floors: 3
- Website: shopmacarthur.com

MacArthur Center was a shopping mall in Norfolk, Virginia, United States, in the center of the Hampton Roads metropolitan area.

Built by Taubman Centers, the mall is owned by the City of Norfolk since August 2023. The 1.1 million ft^{2} (100,000 m^{2}) mall was adjacent to the General Douglas MacArthur Memorial. There were 400,000 ft^{2} (37,000 m^{2}) of mall tenant shops and 100,000 ft^{2} (9,300 m^{2}) of food and entertainment offerings, including the Regal MacArthur 18 movie theater.

== Mall history ==
=== 1990s–2000s ===
Plans were announced in June 1994, for a shopping mall bounded by Monticello and City Hall Avenues, Freemason Street and St. Paul's Boulevard. The Southwest corner of the site at Monticello and City Hall Avenues, what would become the corner of the Dillard's tenant at the mall, had previously been the site of Norfolk's historic City Market. That was demolished in the early 1950s for a single building complex with a JCPenney store, garage and office tower, later known as the Systems Management America (SMA) tower—which was imploded on November 24, 1996. The remainder of the 17-acre site had sat vacant since being razed in the early 1960s.

The original mall was intended to have Macy's, who had signed a letter of interest during the early stages of development for the property. The mall officially opened on March 12, 1999.

Beginning in 2005, MacArthur Center operated "MacArthur on Ice", a 7,200-square-foot (670 m^{2}) ice skating rink on the property.

=== Decline – store closures and loan default ===
At the end of the 2010s, the MacArthur Center experienced a wave of store closures due to changing customer spending habits and the effects of the retail apocalypse.

In 2018 and 2019, J Crew, Fossil, Yankee Candle, Banana Republic, Williams Sonoma, Pottery Barn, Eddie Bauer, Charlotte Russe, Forever 21, Brighton Collectables, Chicos, Zales and many other stores announced their closure at the mall. On April 5, 2019, Nordstrom closed their store at the mall, leaving Dillard's as the only anchor store remaining.

In 2020, primarily due to the impacts of the COVID-19 pandemic, Express, Victorias Secret, Talbots, Abercrombie and Fitch, Papyrus, Francescas, The Walking Company, Justice, J Jill, New York & Company, and others closed at the mall.

After Starwood Capital Group defaulted on a $750 million loan for the mall, management was temporarily handed over to JLL until Spinoso Real Estate Group began managing the mall in 2021.

In May 2021, Apple announced they would close their MacArthur Center location leaving the Lynnhaven Mall location as their only store in the Hampton Roads area. Following a shooting in April 2022, Texas De Brazil closed its location at the mall. In December 2022, Barnes & Noble closed. In June, 2023, Chili's closed, after almost two decades at the mall.

=== Purchase by the city ===
In March 2021, the city of Norfolk announced plans to redevelop or demolish the mall by 2030 to make room for new developments. The mall would continue to operate normally until then.

In early July 2023, a month after the city of Norfolk purchased the mall, Dillard's, which has been one of the mall's major anchors since the mall's opening, announced it would close its upper two floors to become a single floor clearance store, and that the interior entrance to the mall from Dillard's would be permanently closed. Its last day was September 4, 2023.

In mid-July 2023, the development authority voted to allocate $4 million to purchase Dillard's, meaning that the mall was now be entirely under City of Norfolk control and will potentially pave the way for redevelopment plans.

In January 2026, it was announced that the Regal Cinemas, the final anchor which had occupied most of the third floor of the mall, would close. In February 2026, it was announced that the mall would close on June 30, 2026, with demolition expected by late of next year with plans for redevelopment. The mall permanently closed on June 27, 2026 at 5 PM EDT.
