= Ellsworth Place =

Coordinates: 38°59′47″N 77°1′37″W

- Location: 8661 Colesville Road, Silver Spring, Maryland, U.S.
- Opened: April 2, 1992
- Owner: GBT Realty
- Num. of anchor tenants: 8
- Floor area: 350,000 square feet (33,000 m^{2})
- Floors: 6
- Public transit: at Silver Spring; Ride On bus: 8, 9, 12, 13, 14, 16, 17, 20, 22, 28; Metrobus: M52, M54, P30
- Website: https://ellsworthplace.com

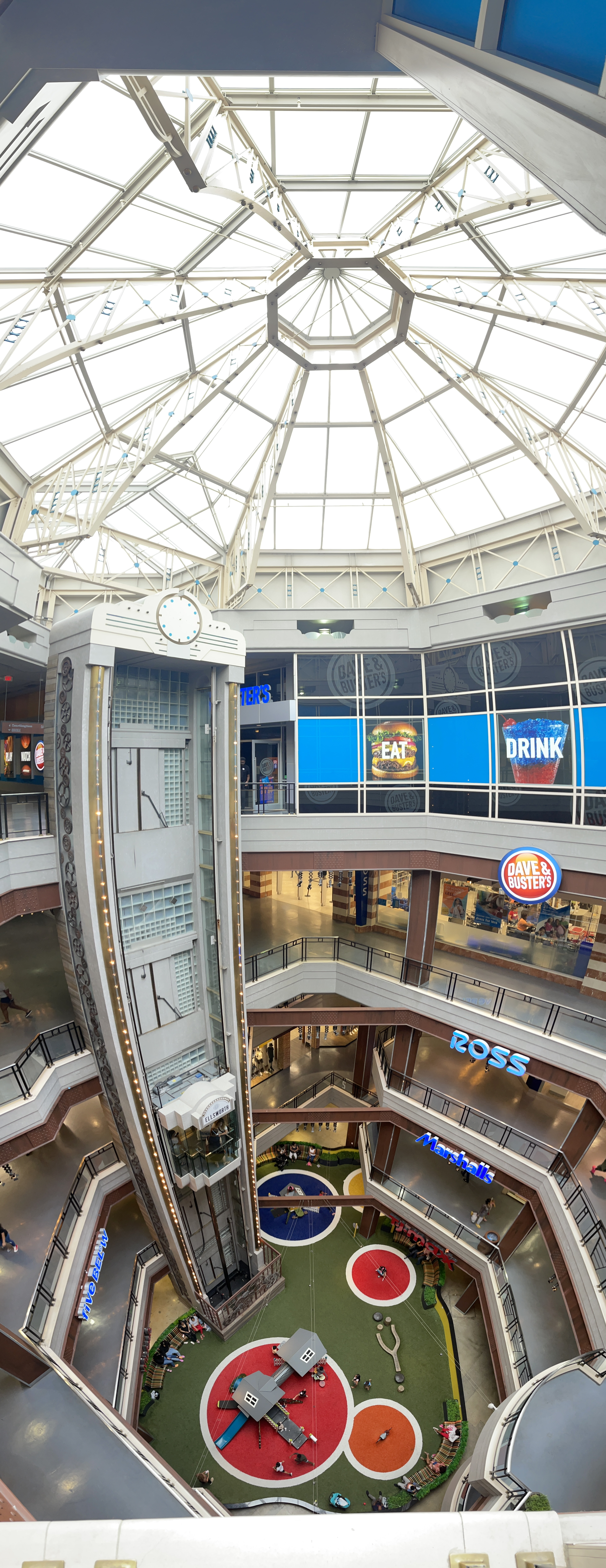
Atrium from which five of the levels can be seen

Ellsworth Place is a 350,000-square-foot (33,000 m^{2}), six-story, enclosed vertical power center in downtown Silver Spring, Maryland. It opened as City Place Mall on April 2, 1992, and is located at the intersection of Fenton Street and Colesville Road (U.S. Route 29). Dave and Buster's opened in November 2016.

The shopping center is located in downtown Silver Spring, which underwent densification and renovation from around 2005 through 2020, resulting in a retail, dining and entertainment hub for the Washington metropolitan area. Ellsworth Place anchors include a two-story Burlington Coat Factory, Nordstrom Rack, Dave & Buster's, (as of August 2022) DSW, Five Below, Marshalls, Michaels, and Ross Dress for Less. An initial redevelopment in the early 2000s saw the addition of a row of street-level shops, including PNC Bank, MOD Pizza, Chipotle Mexican Grill, and Ben & Jerry's.

== History ==
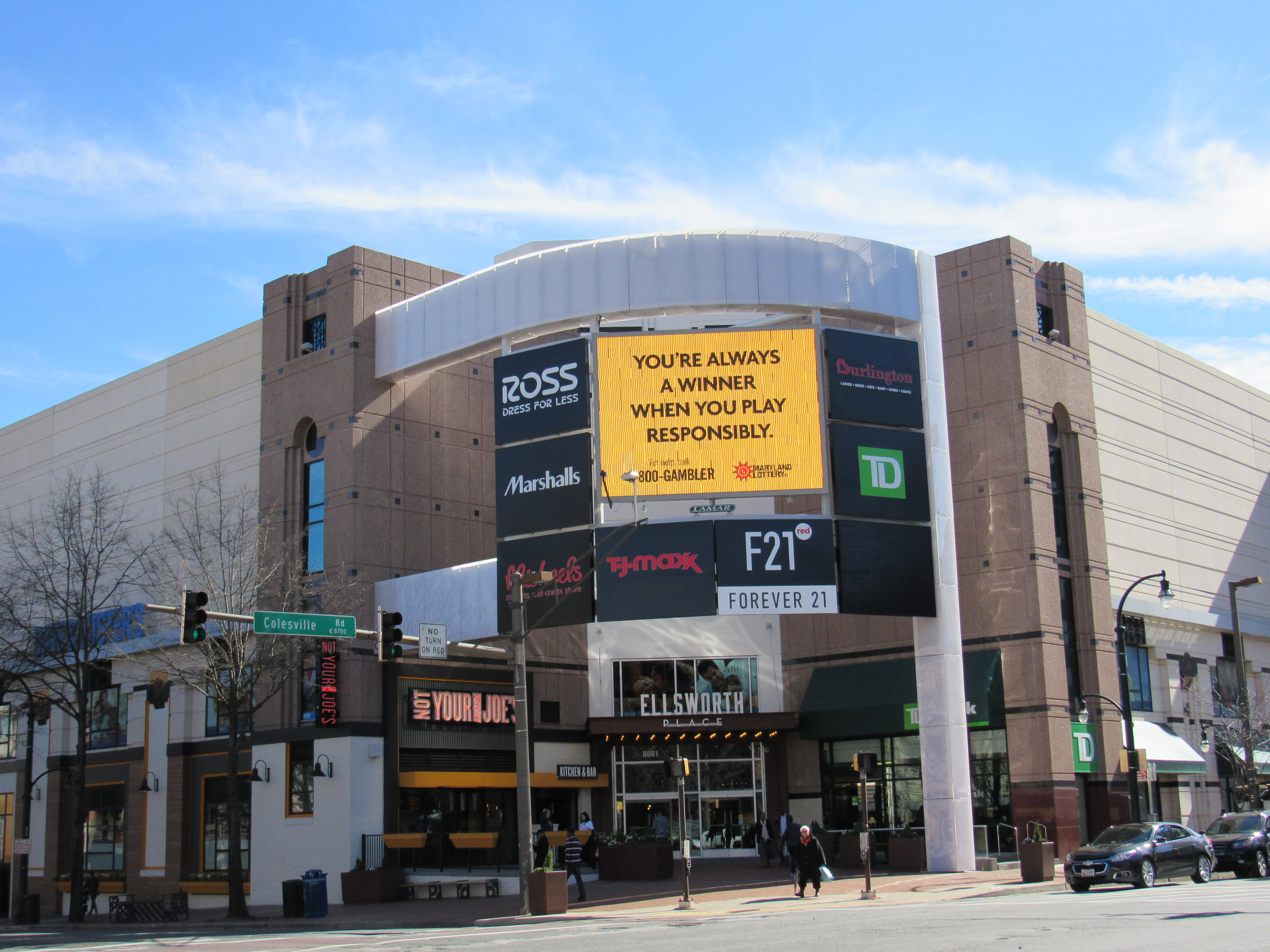
Main Entrance at the corner of Colesville Rd. and Fenton St.

The building that houses the mall was formerly a Hecht Company department store, the first suburban Washington, D.C., branch of that company, which opened in 1947; the downtown Silver Spring Hecht's closed when the Hecht's at Wheaton Plaza opened in 1987. (The mall is an expansion of the original Hecht's building.) From its start, the mall included "upscale" discount stores, including original tenants Nordstrom Rack and Ross Dress for Less. The mall also included an AMC movie theater on its fifth floor, but it closed shortly after a 20-screen Consolidated Theatres (now Regal Cinemas) opened directly across Ellsworth Drive from Ellsworth Place. In 2005 then up-and-coming artist Rihanna performed a free concert at the mall, on a temporary stage built over the center court fountain. The event was sponsored by radio station Hot 99.5, and was in support of her debut album Music of the Sun, with proceeds donated to victims of Hurricane Katrina.
