= Rices Nachmans =

American department store chain

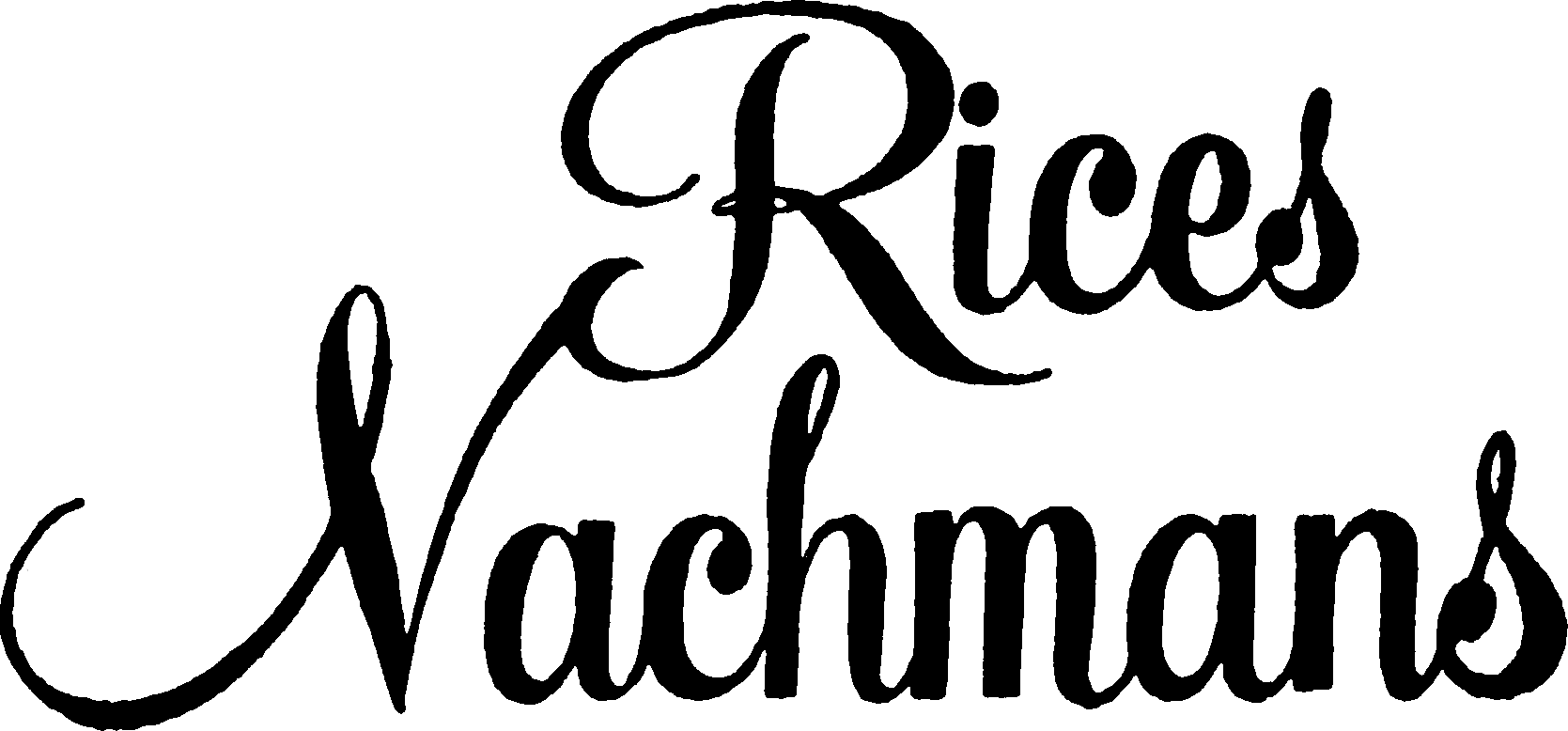
Rices Nachmans logo

Rices Nachmans was an upscale department store chain that, at its peak, had eight locations in Norfolk, Virginia and the surrounding Hampton Roads area. Stores included Downtown Norfolk on Granby St. and Wards Corner (opened 1952). The Wards Corner location was in the same building as a Hofheimer's shoe store. This building was demolished in 2000, and as of 2018, is the location of a Walgreens pharmacy.

In 1985, Rices Nachmans' owner PVH Corp. sold the stores to Hess's, an Allentown, Pennsylvania-based department store chain.
