= Thalhimers =

Defunct American department store

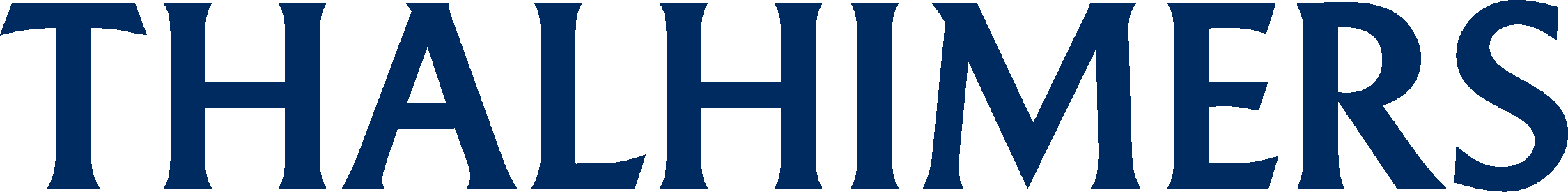

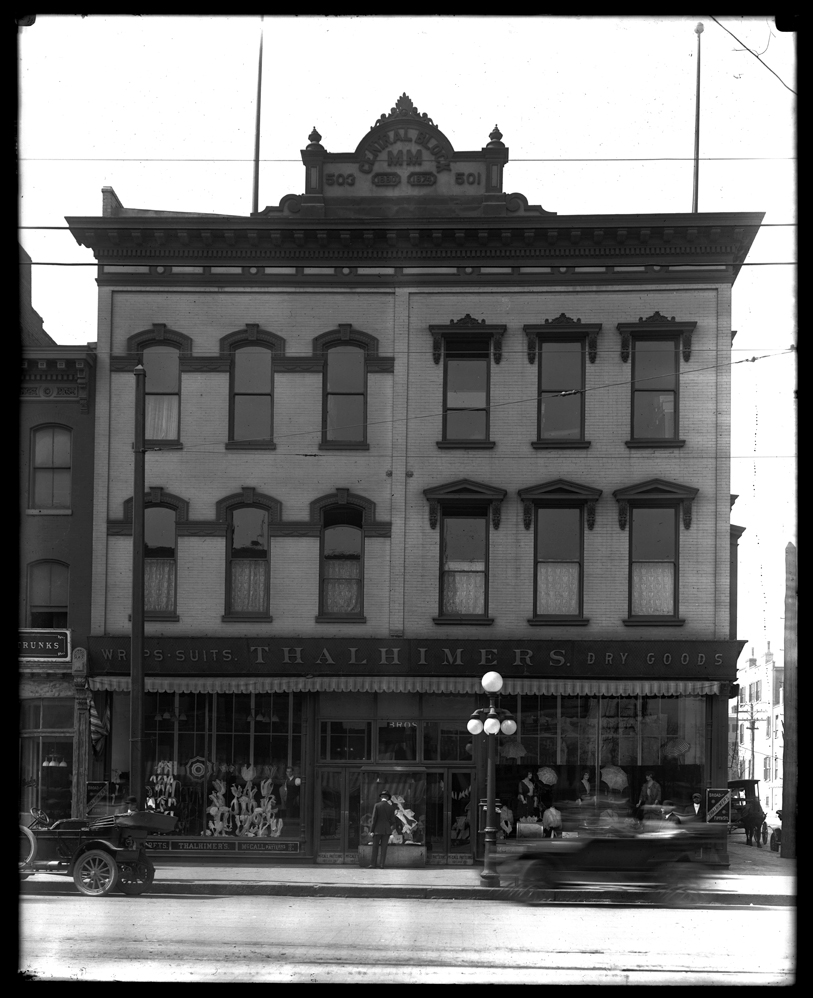
- Exterior of the former flagship store in Richmond (1914)
- Company type: Private
- Industry: Retail
- Genre: Department stores
- Founded: 1842; 184 years ago in Richmond, Virginia, United States
- Founder: William Thalhimer
- Defunct: 1993; 33 years ago
- Fate: Rebranding by The May Department Stores Company
- Successor: Hecht's
- Headquarters: Richmond, Virginia, United States
- Areas served: North Carolina; South Carolina; Tennessee; Virginia
- Parent: Carter Hawley Hale Stores (1978–1990); The May Department Stores Company (1990–1993)

Thalhimers was a department store chain in the Southern United States. Based in Richmond, Virginia, the chain at its peak operated dozens of stores in Virginia, North Carolina, South Carolina, and one store in Memphis, Tennessee. Thalhimer's traditions were most notable during the holiday season with visits from the sticker-distributing Snow Bear and, in later years, the arrival of Lego Land at the downtown Richmond store.

== History ==
Classic logo

William Thalhimer immigrated to the Richmond area from Germany in the early 19th century. In 1842, he opened a dry goods store which his grandson, William B. Thalhimer, transformed into Richmond's first department store. In 1978, the company, developed into a regional department store chain, was acquired by California-based Carter Hawley Hale Stores.

At one time, Carter Hawley Hale owned several notable department stores, including upscale Neiman-Marcus and John Wanamaker. After poor financial results throughout the 1980s, and saddled by the effects of leveraged debt from fending off two leveraged buyout attempts, in 1990, Carter Hawley Hale decided to concentrate on its West Coast department stores such as The Broadway, The Emporium, and Capwell's and sold Thalhimers to St. Louis-based May Company for US$325 million.

The Winston-Salem, North Carolina, store, housed in the Sosnik-Morris-Early Commercial Block, was listed on the National Register of Historic Places in 1984.

In February 1992, Thalhimers was merged into The Hecht Company (May's Washington, DC division), and nearly all locations were rebranded as Hecht's, excluding the two Charleston, SC stores and the Memphis, TN store which were sold to Dillard's, and the store at Lynnhaven Mall, which remained open as Thalhimers until May 1992. The Lynnhaven store became a second Hecht's location in November of that year.

After Federated Department Stores acquired the May Company in 2005, in 2006 when Federated dissolved May's brands, while most of the Hecht's division became part of Macy's East, the Hecht's stores in much of the former Thalhimers territory became part of Macy's South along with the Macy's stores in Louisiana and most of the Foley's stores in Louisiana, Oklahoma, and Texas (the latter excluding the El Paso area stores, which became part of Macy's West).

== Downtown Richmond store ==
An addition to Thalhimers six-story flagship store at Seventh and Broad Streets was built in 1939. Its restaurant, the Richmond Room, was the source of many recipes still published today. The Richmond Room also had a fast food spin-off, the fried chicken chain Golden Skillet. For many years it and its main rival, Miller & Rhoads, were the fashionable retail anchors for downtown Richmond.

On February 22, 1960, a group of students from Virginia Union University, called the Richmond 34, staged a protest against racial segregation at the Richmond Room. All 34 protesters were arrested, the city's first mass arrests of the Civil Rights Movement. The case of Raymond B. Randolph, Jr. v. Commonwealth of Virginia (1961) would test whether trespassing laws constituted a violation of free speech.

Along with several other Thalhimers locations, the downtown flagship closed on January 22, 1992, after purchase by the May Company. It had been the last major department store in the once-bustling retail corridor; Miller & Rhoads had closed in January 1990. The building remained vacant until it was demolished on June 12, 2004, to make way for a performing arts center.

The department store's history, along with the history of the Thalhimer family, has been chronicled in the 2010 book Finding Thalhimers by Elizabeth Thalhimer Smartt, the great-great-great-granddaughter of founder William Thalhimer.

== See also ==
- List of department stores converted to Macy's
- List of defunct department stores of the United States
