= Hecht's =

Defunct US department store chain

- Exterior of the former flagship store in Washington, D.C. (2010)
- Formerly: Hecht Brothers; The Hecht Company
- Type: Subsidiary
- Industry: Retail
- Genre: Department stores
- Founded: 1857; 169 years ago in Baltimore, Maryland, United States
- Founder: Samuel Hecht, Jr.
- Defunct: September 9, 2006
- Fate: Acquisition by Federated Department Stores
- Successor: Bloomingdale's; Macy's
- Headquarters: Washington, D.C., United States
- Number of locations: 81 (2005)
- Areas served: Delaware; Maryland; New Jersey; North Carolina; Pennsylvania; Tennessee; Washington, D.C.; Virginia
- Products: Clothing; footwear; bedding; furniture; jewelry; beauty products; housewares
- Parent: The May Department Stores Company (1959–2005); Federated Department Stores (2005–2006)

Hecht's was an American department store chain founded in 1857 by Samuel Hecht, Jr. It was headquartered in Washington, D.C., and operated in the Mid-Atlantic and Southern United States. The family business was acquired by The May Department Stores Company in 1959, which itself was acquired by Federated Department Stores in 2005. Hecht's was dissolved in favor of the Federated-owned Bloomingdale's and Macy's brands in 2006.

== History ==
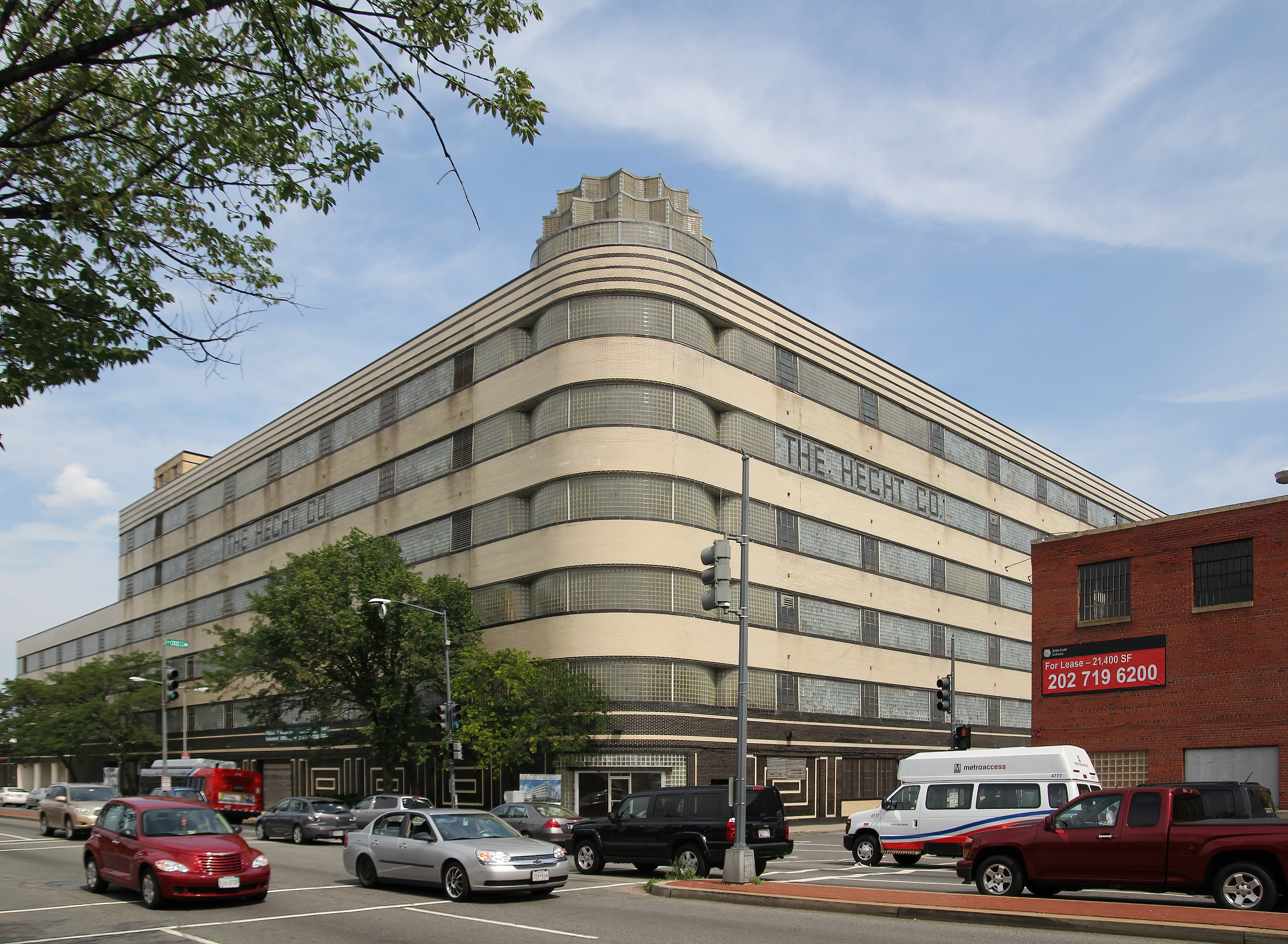
Hecht's former warehouse in northeast Washington, D.C., opened in 1937, now a part of the redevelopment of the Hecht Warehouse District

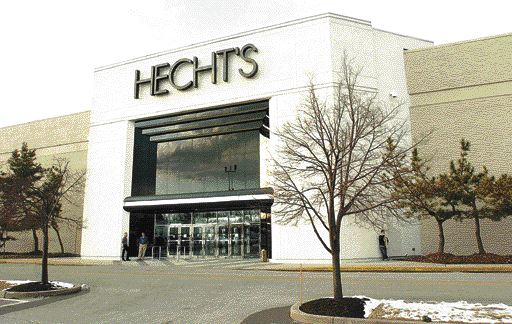
Former Hecht's at Westfield Wheaton in Wheaton, Maryland, until 2006, demolished as Macy's in 2011

The Hecht Company was founded in 1857 by Sam Hecht, Jr. The Hecht family was Jewish and came from the little village of Langenschwarz (now part of Burghaun), Kreis Hünfeld, Hesse, Germany where Sam was born on December 10, 1830. His father Meyer (a.k.a. Meier or Maier) Hecht was a cattle dealer or driver who was drowned in Langenschwarz on June 12, 1835. Meyer's parents were Anschel (a.k.a. Anshil or Asher) Hecht who was a fur dealer and Güta (a.k.a. Giet) née Goldschmidt who was born in Bellersheim, Kreis Hungen, Hesse, Germany.

Sam's older brother Simeon arrived in America on the ship Agnes on September 2, 1844, listed as Sam Hecht, age 21. Meyer's widow Hannah or Hanne Miriam (née Bachrach) was probably born in Hesse, Germany in 1789 or 1790. She left Germany with Sam and his brother Reuben and immigrated to the United States; they arrived in Baltimore, Maryland, on December 15, 1847, on the ship Schiller.

Sam's brothers Jacob, Moses and Raphael (a.k.a. Vogel) and sister Adelheid (a.k.a. Ettel or Edel) had arrived in Baltimore on the ship Albert on July 31, 1845, which departed from Bremen, Germany. There may have been another brother Ansel (a.k.a. Asher Ralph) who immigrated to Baltimore but he has not been found on any passenger lists. Asher Ralph appears in Baltimore city directories between 1844–1858; Ansel appears in New York City directories from 1858.

Sam Hecht, Jr. became an itinerant peddler selling his goods in and around Baltimore and on the Eastern Shore of the Chesapeake Bay. After a decade of itinerant peddling, he settled down and started what would become the Hecht stores. On Jan 5, 1854, Sam married Babette Wolfsheimer in Baltimore.

=== Baltimore stores ===
In 1857 Sam Hecht, Jr. opened a used furniture store on Aliceanna Street (near South Broadway) in Baltimore, Maryland.

By 1870 this venture had moved to a more auspicious location at 519 South Broadway where the name 'HECHT'S RELIABLE STORES' could be seen carved in foot-high letters into the granite cornice above the third floor (now demolished). Clothing was added to the lineup in 1879 under the name of Hecht's Reliable. Shortly thereafter a carpet and matting establishment was opened in Baltimore at 310 West Lexington Street.

Over the front of the new store on Lexington Street was a sign reading 'Samuel Hecht, Jr. & Sons,' reflecting the development of the firm as a family enterprise. Four of Samuel's sons eventually joined him in business. They were, in order of age: Emanuel (Manny), Albert S., Alexander (Alex), and Moses (Mose) S. Hecht.

Emanuel Hecht joined his father in business in 1880. In 1886, he and his brother Albert were listed as partners with their father. Alex and Mose came into the firm later and contributed to its success. Samuel Hecht., Jr. died on February 7, 1907, in Baltimore. His sons, and later his grandsons, carried on the business.

The growth of the firm continued in Baltimore with the opening of the Hecht Brothers store on Baltimore and Pine streets in 1885, the Hub store in Baltimore in 1897, and Hecht Brothers at Howard and Franklin streets in 1926. Hecht stores were also established in New York City and Easton, Maryland. There was also a branch in Annapolis, Maryland. However, the most important move was into Washington, D.C.

=== Washington stores ===
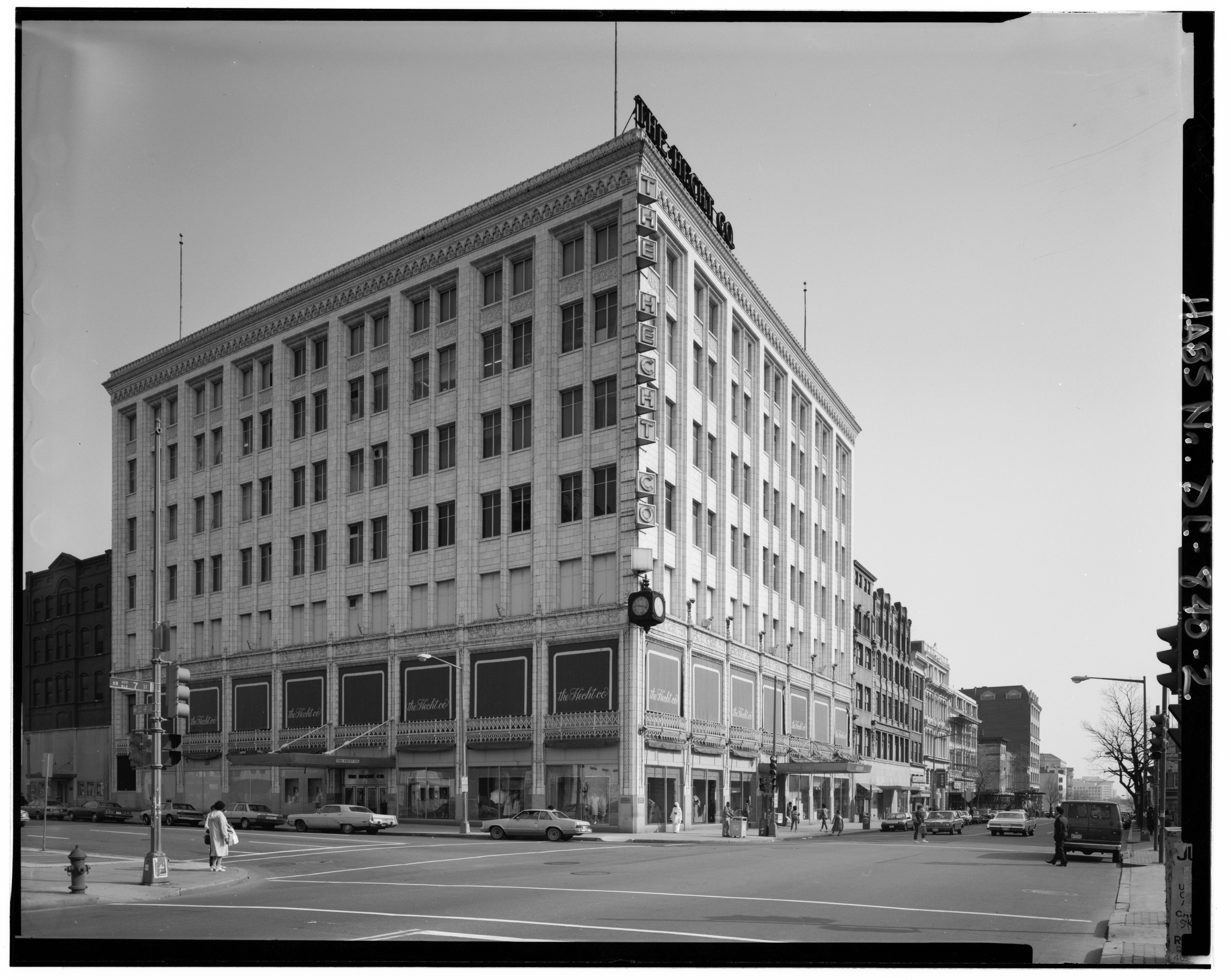
Former Hecht's department store located at 7th and F Streets NW in Washington, D.C. from 1924 to the 1980s.

The Hechts opened a store in Washington on March 20, 1896, which moved to a grand glass and marble store at the corner of 7th and F Streets Northwest, in Washington, D.C.'s downtown shopping district, in November 1925. Alexander Hecht directed the Washington part of the business for the family.

Hecht's was the first store in Washington to offer national brands. It also boasted the first parking garage and first elevator. Its relatively open policies made it popular among African-Americans as well as the white populace.

A tour of Norman Rockwell's Four Freedoms paintings, intended to rally support for the Allied cause in World War II and the purchase of war bonds, premiered at the store in 1943.

In July 1951, a mixed race group began to picket outside the store, protesting racial segregation in the store's cafeteria. The offending policy was changed in January of the following year.

Hecht's moved its flagship store to a new building in downtown Washington in 1985. The former Hecht Company main building, now across from the Capital One Arena, was extensively renovated and reopened in 2003 as Terrell Place, honoring Mary Church Terrell's role in desegregating that and other public accommodations in Washington.

Hecht's operated the last local department store in downtown Washington, in a structure at the corner of 12th and G Streets NW built in 1985 and renovated in 2003. Converted to a Macy's location in September 2006, the building has a direct entrance to the Metro Center station of the Washington Metro.

=== Into the suburbs ===
After World War II, Hecht Company began to build new stores in the suburbs around Baltimore and Washington. Outside the center of Baltimore, Hecht's opened a store in Northwood in September 1954, followed by another in Edmondson Village in October 1956, and a third in the then-new Reisterstown Road Plaza in January 1962.

In 1947, they opened a large three-story department store in Silver Spring, Maryland, just north of Washington, D.C. The wisdom of this move was initially questioned; however, within a few years, more room was needed. A fourth and fifth story were added to the building in 1950 at the corner of Fenton Street and Ellsworth Place. In 1955, The Fenton Street side of the building was expanded all the way down to Colesville RD. That store was closed in October of 1987 and was converted and expanded into City Place Mall, which opened in 1992 and which is now known as Ellsworth Place. The second suburban store opened on November 2, 1951, at Parkington in Arlington County, Virginia. It cost $6.5 million to construct the 300,000-square-foot (28,000 m^{2}) store and it was the largest suburban department store on the east coast at that time. On November 2, 1958, Maryland Gov. Theodore R. McKeldin ceremonially opened the third suburban D.C. Hecht Company store at Prince George's Plaza in Hyattsville. Gov. J. Millard Tawes did the honors on August 29, 1960, when he opened the fourth suburban D.C. location, the 168,000-square-foot (15,600 m^{2}) store at Marlow Heights Shopping Center.

=== May Company ===
The Hecht chain was acquired by the May Company in 1959. At this time, the historic 1924 Bernheim-Leader store on the corner of Howard and Lexington Streets in Baltimore was renamed Hecht's, becoming its flagship store in the Baltimore area. It closed in 1988, one of the last department stores to remain in the downtown district. In 1998, it was declared a city landmark, and has since been renovated into apartments owned by Southern Management.

Many other stores acquired later were also rebranded as Hecht's. In 1990, Hecht's acquired four Miller & Rhoads stores in Virginia. That same year, the May company acquired the Thalhimers chain from Carter Hawley Hale Stores. In 1993, it was announced that the Thalhimers stores would be folded under the Hecht's name. When May took over ten Hess's stores, based in Allentown, Pennsylvania, three of them re-opened as Hecht's and the others were operated by corporate siblings Kaufmann's and Filene's. Hecht's acquired Wanamaker's, based in Philadelphia, and Woodward & Lothrop, based in Washington, D.C., taking over 17 stores acquired in 1995 in joint acquisition with JCPenney. Fourteen stores were consolidated the same year. Thirteen of Strawbridge and Clothier's stores, based in the Philadelphia area, were acquired in 1996. Following the acquisition, S&C was renamed Strawbridge's. Their management consolidated with Hecht's the same year, but the Strawbridge name was retained and expanded to all the Philadelphia locations.

In the Nashville area, Hecht's took over selected former Castner Knott stores, which had been purchased from East Tennessee–based Proffitt's in 2001. Proffitt's previously acquired them as a result of the Mercantile Stores/Dillard's merger in 1998, and briefly rebranded them as Proffitt's locations.

Logos

1960 to 1972.

1972 to 1973

1973 to 1978

1978 to 2006

== See also ==
- List of department stores converted to Macy's
- List of defunct department stores of the United States
